= Writing systems of Africa =

The writing systems of Africa are the current and historical writing systems used on the African continent, both those which are indigenous and those which were introduced. In many African societies, history was traditionally recorded orally despite most societies having developed a writing script, leading to them being termed "oral cultures" in contrast to "literate cultures". (Note: This characterisation has come under criticism by some African scholars, as it implies conflict between the oral and written. They instead contend that in reality, the characterisation is defined by the interaction between three ways of expression and diffusion: the oral, the written, and the printed word. Bethwell Allan Ogot notes that images of Africa composed by Western writers have often been in terms of "opposites" and how "they" differ from "us".) However, this generalization misses the significant pre-modern use of written languages in various African cultures and the widespread modern adoption of written language on the continent.

Today, the Latin script is commonly encountered across much of Africa, especially in the regions of Western Africa, Central Africa, and Southern Africa. The Arabic script is mainly used in North Africa. Among the indigenous writing systems, the Ge'ez script is widely used in the Horn of Africa, and the Tifinagh script is used in many parts of the Sahel region. Variations of the Arabic-derived Ajami script are also notably used in various regions of Subsaharan Africa. There are also several widely used constructed writing systems in wide use today in West Africa, with the most frequently used being the Vai syllabary and the N'Ko script.

There are also various notable indigenous African writing systems which are no longer in common use today, the most famous being Egyptian hieroglyphs. A significant number of less common writing systems are also of significant local, regional, or historical importance, many of which are described below.

While historic writing systems from North Africa are among the oldest in the world, native writing systems and scripts are less common in the cultures of Subsaharan Africa. However, this is not to say that there are no indigenous pre-modern writing systems in the region; the Tifinagh script has been used by the Tuareg people since antiquity, as has the Geʽez script and its derivatives in the Horn of Africa. Other groups have encountered the Latin and Arabic scripts for centuries, but rarely adopted them in a widespread manner until the 19th century as they simply did not find them necessary for their own societies (Ajamiyya writing being a notable exception).

== Indigenous writing and symbolic systems ==
=== Ancient African orthographies ===
==== Ancient Egyptian ====
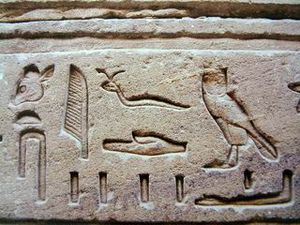
Egyptian hieroglyphs

Perhaps the most famous African writing system is ancient Egyptian hieroglyphs. These developed later into forms known as Hieratic, Demotic and, through Phoenician and Greek, Coptic. The Bohairic dialect of the Coptic language is still used today as the liturgical language in the Coptic Orthodox Church of Alexandria and the Coptic Catholic Church of Alexandria. Other dialects of Coptic include Sahidic, Akhmimic, Lycopolitan, Fayyumic, and Oxyrhynchite.

==== Ancient Meroitic ====
The Meroitic language and its writing system was used in Meroë and the wider Kingdom of Kush (in modern day Sudan) during the Meroitic period. The Kingdom of Kush previously used the Egyptian writing system since 2000 BC. The meroitic script was used from 450 BC to 400 AD.

==== Tifinagh ====
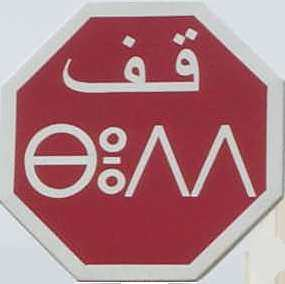
Bilingual and biscriptal "Stop" sign in Tifinagh. (qif in Arabic, bedd in Riffian)

The Tifinagh alphabet is still actively used to varying degrees in trade and modernized forms for writing of Berber languages (Tamazight, Tamashek, etc.) of the Maghreb, Sahara, and Sahel regions (Savage 2008).

Neo-Tifinagh is encoded in the Unicode range U+2D30 to U+2D7F, starting from version 4.1.0. There are 55 defined characters, but there are more characters being used than those defined. In ISO 15924, the code Tfng is assigned to Neo-Tifinagh.

==== Ge'ez ====
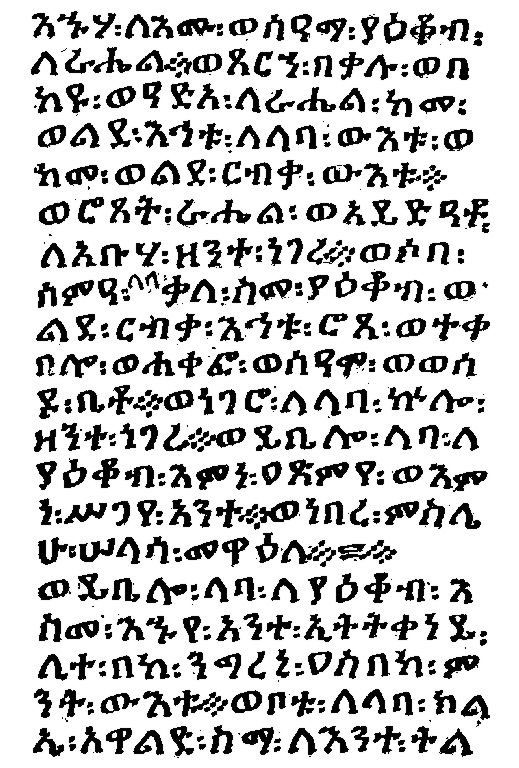
Genesis 29.11–16 in Geʽez

The Geʽez script is an abugida that was created in the Kingdom of Aksum (in modern-day Ethiopia and Eritrea) in the 1st-4th century AD for writing the Geʽez language. It developed from the Ancient South Arabian (Sabaean) Script which was introduced to Ethiopia and Eritrea around 800 BC. The script is used today in Ethiopia and Eritrea for Amharic, Tigrinya, and several other languages. It is sometimes called Ethiopic, and is known in Eritrea and Ethiopia as the fidel or abugida.

Geʽez or Ethiopic has been computerized and assigned Unicode 3.0 codepoints between U+1200 and U+137F (decimal 4608–4991), containing the basic syllable signs for Geʽez, Amharic, and Tigrinya, punctuation and numerals.

=== Symbols ===
==== Nsibidi ====
Nsibidi (also known as "nsibiri", "nchibiddi", and "nchibiddy") is a system of symbols indigenous to what is now southeastern Nigeria that is apparently an ideographic script, though there have been suggestions that it includes logographic elements. The symbols are at least several centuries old: early forms appeared on excavated pottery as well as what are most likely ceramic stools and headrests from the Calabar region, with a range of dates from 400 (and possibly earlier, 2000 BC) to 1400 CE.

==== Adinkra ====
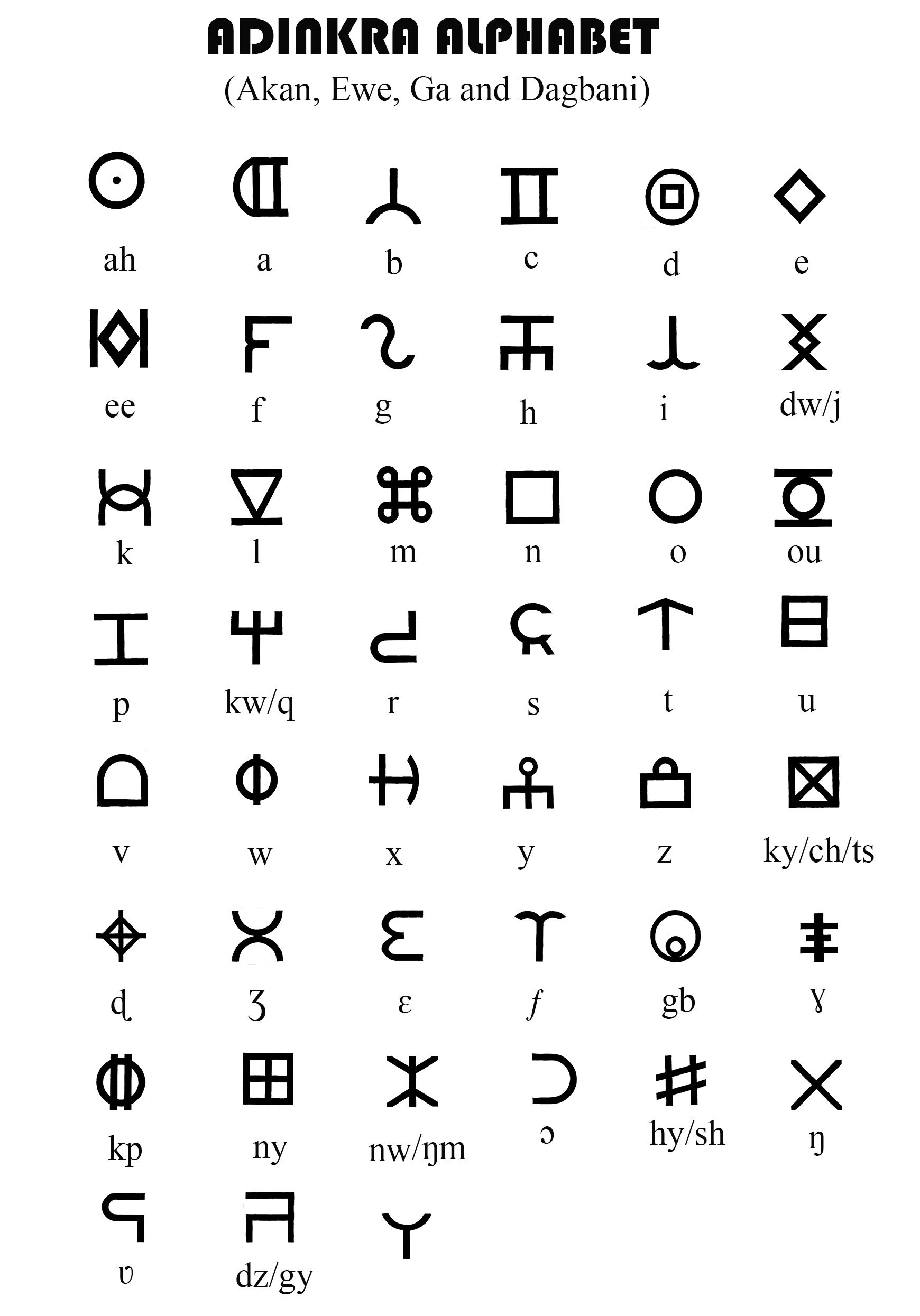
Adinkra alphabet as proposed by Charles Korankye

Adinkra is a set of symbols developed by the Akan, used to represent concepts and aphorisms. Oral tradition attributes the origin of adinkra to Gyaman in modern-day Ghana and Côte d'Ivoire. According to Kwame Anthony Appiah, they were one of the means for "supporting the transmission of a complex and nuanced body of practice and belief". Some attempts have been made to adapt the Adinkra iconography into an alphabet for writing languages of Ghana, but those haven't found wide use yet.

==== Lusona ====
Lusona is a system of ideograms that functioned as mnemonic devices to record proverbs, fables, games, riddles and animals, and to transmit knowledge. They originate in what is now eastern Angola, northwestern Zambia and adjacent areas of the Democratic Republic of the Congo.

=== Modern orthographies ===
==== East Africa ====
- The Luo script was developed to write Dholuo in Kenya in 2009.

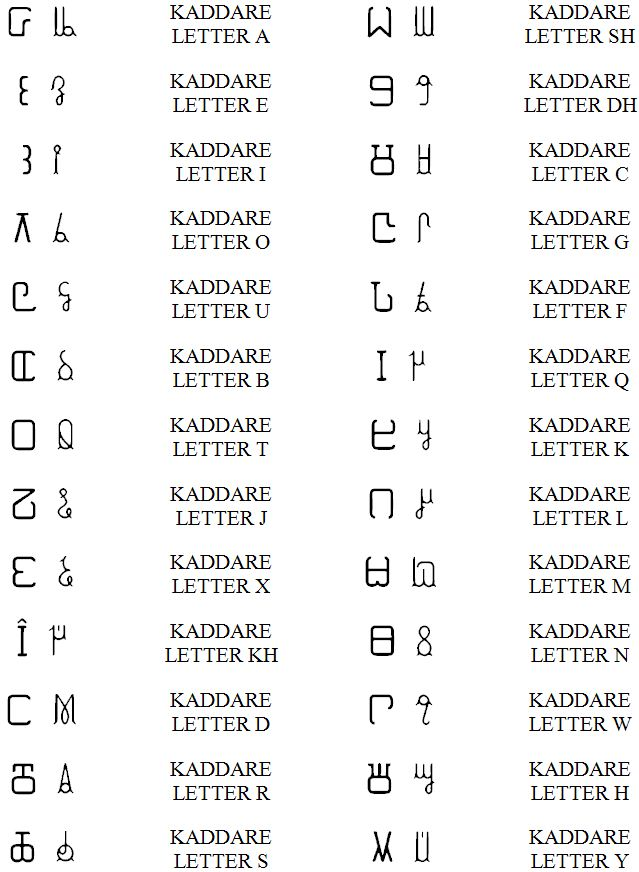
The Kaddare alphabet

- Somalia: Writing systems developed in the twentieth century for transcribing Somali include the Osmanya, Gadabuursi (or Borama), and Kaddare alphabets, which were invented by Osman Yusuf Kenadid, Sheikh Abdurahman Sheikh Nuur and Hussein Sheikh Ahmed Kaddare, respectively. The Osmanya script is today available in the Unicode range 10480-104AF [from U+10480 - U+104AF (66688–66735)].
- An alphasyllabic script for Oromo in Ethiopia was invented in the late 1950s by Sheikh Bakri Sapalo (1895-1980), and saw limited use.
- An alphabetic script called Nilerian has been invented by Aleu Majok for Dinka and other languages of South Sudan.

==== Southern Africa ====
- The Mwangwego alphabet was developed for languages of Malawi.
- IsiBheqe SoHlamvu (Bheqe Syllabary), also known as Ditema tsa Dinoko, is a featural syllabary used to write siNtu languages.

==== Central Africa ====
- The Bamum script was developed largely by Sultan Ibrahim Njoya of the Kingdom of Bamum in Northwest Cameroon. It is a semi-syllabary writing system that utilizes the Bamum language. It is rarely used today, but a fair amount of material written in this script still exists.
- The Eghap script was used by the Bagam (Tuchscherer 1999, Rovenchak 2009) of Cameroon
- The Mandombe script was invented by Wabeladio Payi in 1978 in what is now Kongo Central province, Democratic Republic of the Congo. It is promoted by the Kimbanguist Church and used for writing Kikongo, Lingala, Tshiluba, Swahili, and other languages.
- Zaghawa (Beria) of Darfur and Chad, developed by Siddick Adam Issa from an earlier proposal by schoolteacher Adam Tajir based on traditional livestock brands.

==== West Africa ====
There are various other writing systems native to West Africa and Central Africa. In the last two centuries, a large variety of writing systems have been created in Africa (Dalby 1967, 1968, 1969). Some are still in use today, while others have been largely displaced by non-African writing such as the Arabic script and the Latin script. Below are non-Latin and non-Arabic-based writing systems used to write various languages of Africa:

- The Adlam alphabet developed for writing the Fula language, taught mostly in Guinea but has also been spread in neighboring countries like Senegal and Gambia.
- The Ba script, named for its creator Adama Ba, used to write Fula.
- Bassa alphabet of Liberia
- Bété syllabary of Ivory Coast
- Dita, used to write Fula.
- The Garay alphabet, used to write Wolof and Mandinka in Senegal and The Gambia
- Gbékoun script for Fon and other Languages of Benin.
- Gola Script for Liberia and eastern Sierra Leone.
- Several scripts used for the Hausa language
- Koré Sèbèli, developed in 2009 by sociologist Mohamed Bentoura Bangoura for writing the Susu language of Guinea and Sierra Leone.
- Kpelle syllabary of Liberia and Guinea
- Loma syllabary of Liberia and Guinea
- Masaba, a syllabary invented by Woyo Couloubayi (c.1910-1982) in the early 1930s for the Bambara language of Mali.
- Medefaidrin of the Obɛri Ɔkaimɛ Church for Ibibio people.
- The Mende Ki-ka-ku or KiKaKui syllabary, invented by Kisimi Kamara in Sierra Leone in the early 20th century. It is still used.
- Ńdébé, developed between 2009-2020 by Nigerian software engineer Lotanna Igwe-Odunze for the Igbo language.
- N'Ko, invented in 1949 by Solomana Kante in Guinea, primarily for the Manding languages. It is apparently in increasing use in West Africa, including some efforts to adapt it to other languages (Wyrod 2008).
- The Nwagu Aneke syllabary invented in the 1950s for the Igbo language of southeastern Nigeria.
- The Oduduwa script of Benin and Nigeria, invented by Tolúlàṣẹ Ògúntósìn in 2016-2017 for the Yoruba language
- The Rainbow Oracle script invented by Aba Ota for the Edo language in what is now Benin during 1999.
- The Vai syllabary invented by Mɔmɔlu Duwalu Bukɛlɛ for the Vai language in what is now Liberia during the early 19th century. It is still used today.
- Yoruba Holy Writing for the texts of the Yoruba religion.

==== North Africa ====
Neo-Tifinagh, mentioned above.

== Introduced and adapted writing systems ==
The Phoenician alphabet

Most written scripts, including Greek, Hebrew, and Arabic, were based on previous written scripts and the origin of the history of the alphabet is ultimately Egyptian Hieroglyphs, through Proto-Sinaitic or Old Canaanite. Many other indigenous African scripts were similarly developed from previous scripts.

=== Phoenician/Punic ===
The Phoenicians from what is now Lebanon traded with North Africans and founded cities there, the most famous being Carthage. The Phoenician alphabet is thought to be the origin of many others, including: Arabic, Greek, and Latin. The Carthaginian dialect is called Punic. Today's Tifinagh is thought by some scholars to be descended from the alphabet used for Punic, but this is still under debate.

Additionally, the Proto-Sinaitic Wadi el-Hol inscriptions indicate the presence of an extremely early form of the script in central Egypt (near the modern city of Qena) in the early 2nd millennium BC.

=== Greek ===
The Greek alphabet was adapted in Egypt to the Coptic alphabet (with the addition of 7 letters derived from ancient Demotic) in order to write the language (which is today only a liturgical language of the Coptic Church). An uncial variant of the Coptic alphabet was used from the 8th to the 15th century for writing Old Nubian, an ancient variety of the Nubian language.

=== Arabic ===
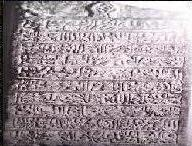
Ancient Somali–Arabic stone tablet: A system also known as Wadaad's writing.

The Arabic script was introduced into Africa by the spread of Islam and by trade. Apart from its obvious use for the Arabic language, it has been adapted for a number of other languages over the centuries. The Arabic script is still used in some of these cases, but not in others.

It was often necessary to modify the script to accommodate sounds not represented in the script as used for the Arabic language. The adapted form of the script is also called Ajami, especially in the Sahel, and sometimes by specific names for individual languages, such as Wolofal, Sorabe, and Wadaad's writing. Despite the existence of a widely known and well-established script in Ethiopia and Eritrea there are a few cases where Muslims in Ethiopia and Eritrea have used the Arabic script, instead, for reasons of religious identity.

There are no official standard forms or orthographies, though local usage follows traditional practice for the area or language. There was an effort by ISESCO to standardize Ajami usage. Some critics believe this relied too much on Perso-Arabic script forms and not enough on existing use in Africa. In any event, the effect of that standardization effort has been limited.

=== Latin ===
Table of Unicode Berber Latin alphabet letters used in Kabyle

Though the Latin Script was used to write Latin throughout Roman Africa and a handful of Latin-script inscriptions in the Punic language (more commonly written in the Phoenician script, as noted above) also survive, the first systematic attempts to adapt it to African languages were probably those of Christian missionaries on the eve of European colonization (Pasch 2008). These, however, were isolated, done by people without linguistic training, and sometimes resulted in competing systems for the same or similar languages.

One of the challenges in adapting the Latin script to many African languages was the use in those tongues of sounds unfamiliar to Europeans and thus without writing convention they could resort to. Various use was made of letter combinations, modifications, and diacritics to represent such sounds. Some resulting orthographies, such as the Yoruba writing system established by the late 19th century, have remained largely intact.

In many cases, the colonial regimes had little interest in the writing of African languages, but in others they did. In the case of Hausa in Northern Nigeria, for instance, the colonial government was directly involved in determining the written forms for the language.

Since the colonial period, there have been efforts to propose and promulgate standardized or at least harmonized approaches to using the Latin script for African languages. Examples include the Lepsius Standard Alphabet (mid-19th century) and the Africa Alphabet of the International Institute of African Languages and Cultures (1928, 1930).

Following independence there has been continued attention to the transcription of African languages. In the 1960s and 1970s, UNESCO facilitated several "expert meetings" on the subject, including a seminal meeting in Bamako in 1966, and one in Niamey in 1978. The latter produced the African Reference Alphabet. Various country-level standardizations have also been made or proposed, such as the Pan-Nigerian alphabet. A Berber Latin alphabet for northern Berber includes extended Latin characters and two Greek letters.

Such discussions continue, especially on more local scales regarding cross-border languages.

=== Hebrew ===
There has been a Jewish presence in North Africa for millennia, with communities speaking a variety of different languages. Though some of these are written with the Arabic script (as is the case with Judeo-Tunisian Arabic) or with Ge'ez (as with Kayla and Qwara), many- including Haketia and several forms of Judeo-Arabic- have made frequent or exclusive use of the Hebrew alphabet.

=== Braille ===
Braille, a tactile script widely used by the visually impaired, has been adapted to write several African languages- including those of Nigeria, South Africa and Zambia.

== Office/computer technology, fonts and standards ==
=== Typewriters ===
There is not much information on the adaptation of typewriters to African language needs (apart from Arabic, and the African languages that do not use any modified Latin letters). There were apparently some typewriters fitted with keys for typing Nigerian languages. There was at least one IBM Selectric typewriter "typeball" developed for some African languages (including Fula).

Around 1930, the English typewriter was modified by Ayana Birru of Ethiopia to type an incomplete and ligated version of the Amharic alphabet. Typewriters for the Geez script, used in Ethiopia and Eritrea, were mass produced by Olivetti starting in the 1950s.

The 1982 proposal for a unicase version of the African Reference Alphabet made by Michael Mann and David Dalby included a suggested typewriter adaptation.

=== Early computing and fonts ===
With early desktop computers it was possible to modify existing 8-bit Latin fonts to accommodate specialized character needs. This was done without any kind of system or standardization, meaning incompatibility of encodings.

Similarly, there were diverse efforts (successful, but not standardized) to enable use of Ethiopic-Eritrean /Ge'ez on computers. The earliest computer output of the Fidel was developed for a nine-pin dot matrix printer in 1983, by a team that included people from the Bible Society of Ethiopia, churches, and missions. The first item published with this system was a Christian song book, እንዘምር.

=== Current standards ===
There was never any ISO 8859 standard for any native African languages. One standard – ISO 6438 for bibliographic purposes – was adopted but apparently little used (curiously, although this was adopted at about the same time as the African Reference Alphabet, there were some differences between the two, indicating perhaps a lack of communication between efforts to harmonize transcription of African languages and the ISO standards process).

Unicode in principle resolves the issue of incompatible encoding, but other questions such as the handling of diacritics in extended Latin scripts are still being raised. These in turn relate to fundamental decisions regarding orthographies of African languages.

A number of contemporary and historic African scripts including Adlam, Bamum, Bassa Vah, Coptic, Egyptian Hieroglyphs, Garay, Ge'ez, Medefaidrin, Mende Ki-ka-ku, Meroitic, N'Ko, Osmanya, Tifinagh, and Vai are currently included in the Unicode standard, as are individual characters to other ranges of languages used, such as Latin and Arabic. Efforts to encode African scripts, including minority scripts and major historical writing systems like Egyptian hieroglyphs, are being coordinated by the Script Encoding Initiative.

== See also ==
- West African manuscripts

== Sources ==
- CISSE, Mamadou. 2006. Ecrits et écritures en Afrique de l'Ouest. Sudlangues n°6. http://www.sudlangues.sn/spip.php?article101
- Dalby, David. 1967. A survey of the indigenous scripts of Liberia and Sierra Leone: Vai, Mende, Kpelle, and Bassa. African Language Studies 8:1-51.
- Dalby, David. 1968. The indigenous scripts of West Africa and Surinam: their inspiration and design. African Language Studies 9:156-197.
- Dalby, David. 1969. Further indigenous scripts of West Africa: Manding, Wolof, and Fula alphabets and Yoruba holy-writing. African Language Studies 10:161-191
- Hayward, Richard J. and Mohammed Hassan. 1981. The Oromo Orthography of Shaykh Bakri Sapalo. Bulletin of the School of Oriental and African Studies 44.3:550-556.
- Kubik, Gerhard (2006). Tusona: Luchazi Ideographs : a Graphic Tradition of West-Central Africa. LIT Verlag Münster. ISBN 978-3-8258-7601-2.
- Laitin, David D. (1977). Politics, Language, and Thought: The Somali Experience. University of Chicago Press. ISBN 978-0-226-46791-7.
- Mafundikwa, Saki. 2004. Afrikan alphabets: the story of writing in Afrika. West New York, NJ: Mark Batty. ISBN 0-9724240-6-7
- Pasch, Helma. 2008. Competing scripts: the introduction of the Roman alphabet in Africa. International Journal for the Sociology of Language 191:65-109.
- Savage, Andrew. 2008. Writing Tuareg — the three script options. International Journal of the Sociology of Language 192: 5-14.
- Tuchscherer, Konrad. 1999. The lost script of the Bagam. African Affairs 98:55-77.
- Unseth, Peter. 2016. The international impact of Sequoyah’s Cherokee syllabary. Written Language & Literacy 19(1), pp. 75–93. [The impact of Cherokee to Vai and then Vai on others in W. Africa]
- Wyrod, Christopher. 2008. A social orthography of identity: the N’ko literacy movement in West Africa. International Journal of the Sociology of Language 192:27-44.
