= Somali writing systems =

Writing systems for the Somali language

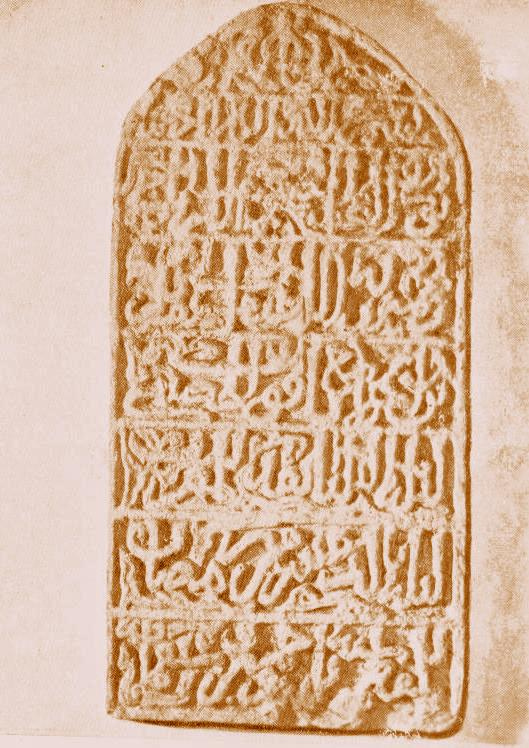
14th-century stone tablet in Wadaad's writing

A number of writing systems have been used to transcribe the Somali language. Of these, the Somali Latin alphabet is the most widely used. It has been the official writing script in Somalia since the Supreme Revolutionary Council formally introduced it in October 1972, and was disseminated through a nationwide rural literacy campaign. Prior to the twentieth century, the Arabic script was used for writing Somali. An extensive literary and administrative corpus exists in Arabic script. It was the main script historically used by the various Somali sultans to keep records. Writing systems that developed locally in the nineteenth and twentieth centuries include the Osmanya, Borama and Kaddare scripts.

== Latin script ==
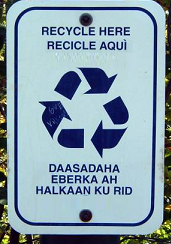
Recycling sign in Minneapolis that includes instructions written with the Somali Latin alphabet

The Somali Latin script, or Somali Latin alphabet, was developed by a number of leading scholars of Somali, including Musa Haji Ismail Galal, Bogumił Andrzejewski and Shire Jama Ahmed specifically for transcribing the Somali language. It uses all letters of the English Latin alphabet except p, v and z, and has 21 consonants and five vowels. There are no diacritics or other special characters, except the use of the apostrophe for the glottal stop, which does not occur word-initially. Additionally, there are three consonant digraphs: DH, KH and SH. Tone is not marked, and front and back vowels are not distinguished. Capital letters are used at the beginning of a sentence and for proper names.

A number of attempts had been made from the 1920s onwards to standardize the language using a number of different alphabets. Shortly following independence and the 1960 union, the Somali Language Committee was created, headed by Somali scholar Musa Haji Ismail Galal, the first Somali professionally trained in modern phonetics. The committee recommended the use of a modified Latin script in 1962. The civilian administration at the time was unwilling to make a decision due to the controversial nature of the debate. The Latin script was seen to have been brought to the territory by colonial powers; proponents of other scripts used the phrase "Latin waa laa diin" (Latin is irreligion). Galal continued to lead Somali researchers throughout the 1960s in investigating alternative native systems of inscription suitable for use as official orthography.

In 1966, a UNESCO commission of linguists led by linguist Bogumił Andrzejewski added weight to the choice of the 1962 commission and picked the Latin script. The issue was still divisive, and the Somali government remained hesitant.

The issue was finally resolved by the military upon seizing power in 1969. An informal practice of using Latin by the army and police forces culminated in the official adoption of Latin script as the official orthography of the Somali state.

== Arabic script ==
Before the arrival of the Italians and British, Somalis and religious fraternities either wrote in Arabic or used an ad hoc transliteration of Somali into Arabic script referred to as Wadaad's writing. It contains 32 letters; 10 of them are vowels, the remainder are consonants.

According to Bogumił Andrezewski, this usage was limited to Somali clerics and their associates, as sheikhs preferred to write in the liturgical Arabic language. Various such historical manuscripts in Somali nonetheless exist, which mainly consist of Islamic poems (qasidas), recitations and chants. Among these texts are the Somali poems by Sheikh Uways and Sheikh Ismaaciil Faarah. The rest of the existing historical literature in Somali principally consists of translations of documents from Arabic.

== Osmanya script ==
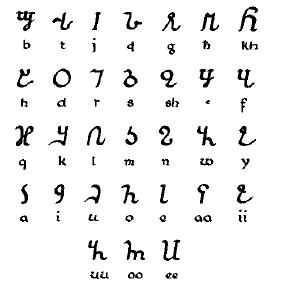
The Osmanya script, the most popular indigenous Somali script

The Osmanya script, also known as Far Soomaali ("Somali writing"), is a writing script created to transcribe the Somali language. A phonetically sophisticated alphabet, it was invented between 1920 and 1922 by Cismaan Yuusuf Keenadiid who hails from the Osman Mohamoud clan of the larger Majeerteen. Cismaan devised the script at the start of the national campaign to settle on a standard orthography for Somali.

== Borama script ==
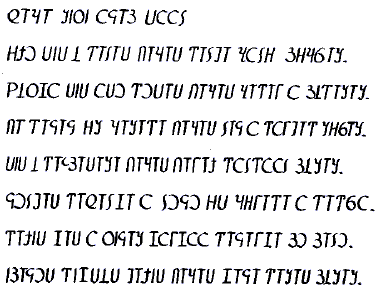
A poem in the Borama alphabet.

The Borama or Gadabuursi script was devised around 1933 by Abdurahman Sheikh Nuur of the Gadabuursi clan. Though not as widely known as Osmanya, it produced a notable body of literature. A quite accurate phonetic writing system, the Borama script was principally used by Nuur and his circle of associates in his native city of Borama.

== Kaddare script ==
The Kaddare script was invented in 1952 by Hussein Sheikh Ahmed Kaddare of the Abgaal Hawiye clan. The technical commissions that appraised the script concurred that it was a very accurate orthography for transcribing Somali. Several of Kaddare's letters are similar to those in the Osmanya alphabet, while others bear a resemblance to Brahmi.

== See also ==
- Regional Somali Language Academy
