= Tumbuka orthography =

Writing system of the Tumbuka language

Tumbuka orthography Tumbuka writing system
- A Mwangwego script for writing Tumbuka language
- Script type: Alphabet
- Creator: Missionaries and colonial administrators, Nolence Mwangwego
- Period: 19th century–present
- Direction: LR
- Official script: Mwangwego script
- Languages: Chitumbuka

Related scripts
- Parent systems: Latin script: Mwangwego; Tumbuka orthography

ISO 15924
- ISO 15924: Latn (215), Latin

Unicode
- Unicode alias: Latin

The Tumbuka orthography is the standardized writing system used for the Tumbuka language, spoken in Malawi, Zambia and Tanzania. It uses a modified Latin script adapted to represent Tumbuka phonology and Mwangwego script as its native writing system developed by Nolence Mwangwego.

== History ==
Tumbuka language, also known as Chitumbuka began to be written in the late 19th century when European missionaries and colonial administrators sought to transcribe the language for religious texts, education, and administration.

In the mid-20th century, the orthography became formalized in textbooks, religious materials, and literacy campaigns, retaining close correspondence between letters and sounds.

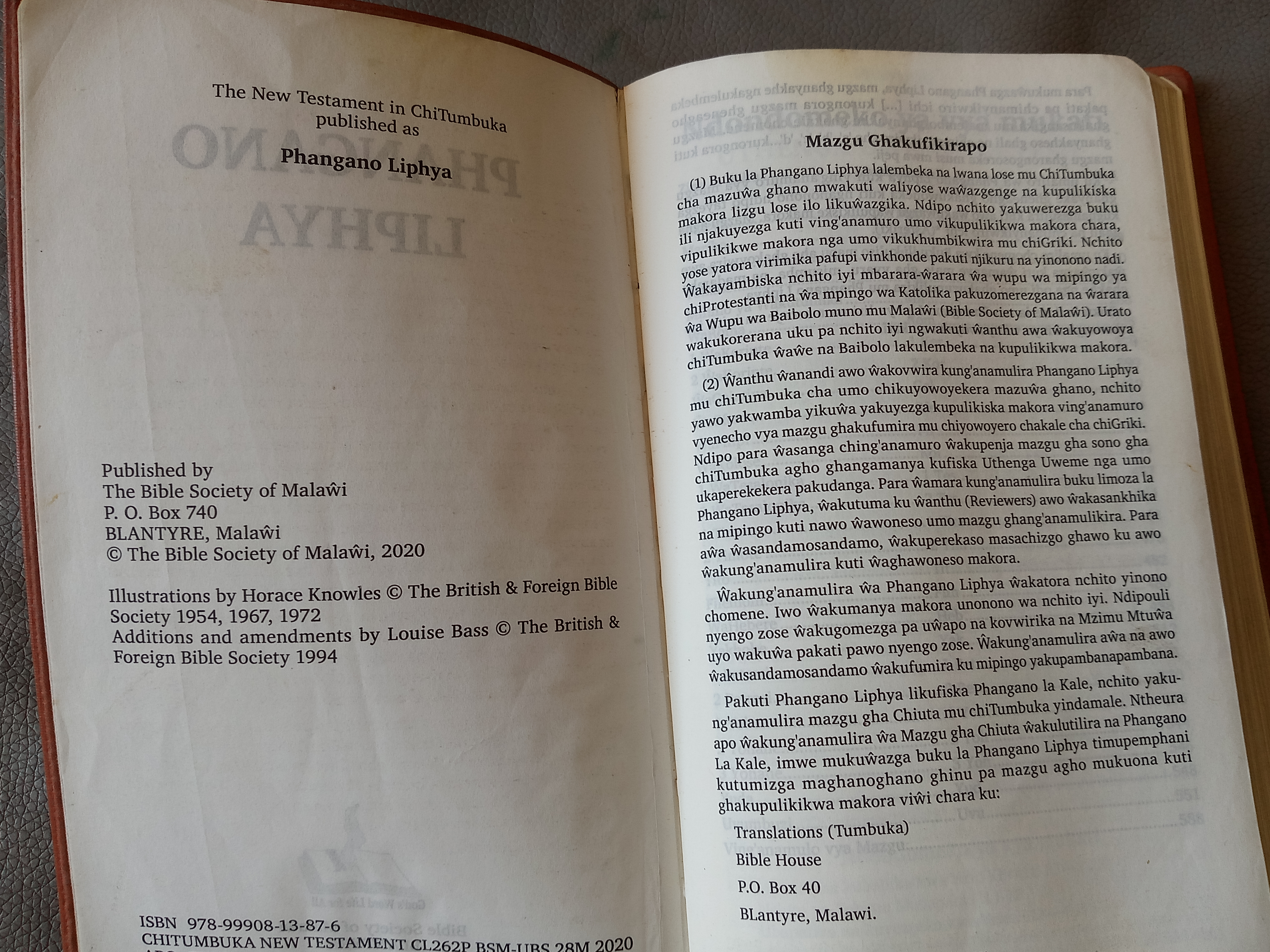
A Tumbuka Bible written in latin

In early 1990s, the government of Malawi addressed an issue sought to establish the country's own writing system called Mwangwego.

== Alphabet and spelling ==
=== Latin ===
Chitumbuka orthography is based on the Latin script. The alphabet generally follows the standard Latin letters with modifications. Special characters include ŵ (representing the voiced labial-velar approximant /w/) and b (for nasal sounds), which are critical for representing the correct pronunciation.

Vowels are written as a, e, i, o, u and are pronounced consistently according to Chitumbuka phonology. Consonants largely match their Latin script counterparts but retain specific local pronunciations, such as b, d, g, l, m, n, p, s, t, w, y, z.

== Punctuation and capitalization ==
Chitumbuka uses punctuation largely consistent with English, including full stops, commas, question marks, and exclamation points. Proper nouns are capitalized, and sentences begin with capital letters.

== Orthographic reforms ==
During the colonial and post-colonial periods, several minor orthographic reforms were introduced to improve literacy and standardize spelling. This included consistent representation of nasalized sounds, tonal markers in dictionaries and linguistic publications, and formalizing diacritics such as ŵ and b.

== Usage ==
Chitumbuka orthography is used in religious texts, including translations of the Bible, newspapers and magazines published in Tumbuka. Other usage include digital communications, social media, and online content in Chitumbuka. There are also academic and linguistic works documenting Tumbuka language and culture.

== See also ==
- Tumbuka language
- Tumbuka people
