= Sheikh Abdurahman Sh. Nur =

Sheikh Nour الرحمن شيخ نور
- Born: Zeila, Somaliland
- Occupations: teacher, judge, qadi, sheikh, author, historian, inventor and poet
- Title: Sheikh
- Children: Abdirahman sheekhnuur Axmed Sheekhnuur xalima sheekhnuur Mooge sheekhnuur

Sheikh Nuur (Somali: Sheekh Nuur, Arabic: شيخ عبد الرحمن شيخ نور) was a Somali Sheikh (religious leader), qādi (judge) of the government at that time and the inventor of the Gadabuursi Script for the Somali language.

== Biography ==
Sh. Nuur was born in [saylac and grew up in Borama Samaroon ( gadabuursi ) of the Gadabuursi. Growing up he was a Qur'anic teacher in the British Somaliland protectorate. His father Sheikh warsame was a well-known and notable figure and was a qādi for many years. He was a learned or knowledgeable man, in particular when it came to the history of his own clan, the Gadabuursi. Sheikh 'nuur would later follow in his father's footsteps by also becoming a qādi, albeit of the entire northern British Somaliland region.

In 1933, Sheikh Nuur devised a quite phonetically accurate new orthography for transcribing the Somali language. While the script enjoyed considerable currency in his home region, the Sheikh harbored no illusions as to its widespread adoption, writing in a publication of his wherein he employed the script itself that "I publish it here with no intention of attempting to contribute to the already abundant confusion in the choice of a standard orthography for Somali".

== See also ==
- Gadabuursi Script
- Osmanya script
- Kaddare script
- Somali alphabet
- Wadaad's writing
- Osman Yusuf Kenadid
- Shire Jama Ahmed
- Hussein Sheikh Ahmed Kaddare
