= Ahmed Idaajaa =

Somali writer

Ahmed Farah Ali Idaajaa احمد فرح علي
- Born: Axmed Faarax Cali; 14 May 1948 (age 78); Galkacyo
- Military career
- Nickname: Idaajaa

Ahmed Farah Ali Idaajaa (Somali: Axmed Faarax Cali Idaajaa) is a Somali literary scholar and publisher of written folklore. Currently residing in England, his work with the BBC and VOA has allowed newer generations of Somali’s post civil war to discover their heritage whilst understanding the complex nature of the country’s politics. He was a member of the Somali National Academy of Culture (SNAC) and the Somali Language Committee.
