= Hussein Sheikh Ahmed Kaddare =

Hussein Sheikh Ahmed Kaddare Xuseen Shiikh Axmed Kaddare
- Born: 2 March 1934; Banaadir, Italian Somaliland
- Died: 1 February 2015 (aged 80); Mogadishu, Somalia
- Occupations: linguist, novelist, playwright, researcher

Hussein Sheikh Ahmed Kaddare (Somali: Xuseen Sheekh Axmed Kaddare, Arabic: حسين الشيخ أحمد كاداري; 2 March 1934 – 1 February 2015) was a Somali inventor, linguist, and researcher in Somali traditions and folklore. Kaddare contributed his linguistic expertise in Somalia's Ministry of information.

Kaddare is widely known for creating the Kaddare script used in transcribing the Somali language.

== Biography ==
Kaddare was born in the town of Adale in the Middle Shebelle region of Somalia in 1934. In 1953, he created the Kaddare script, an orthography named after him that was used to transcribe the Somali language He died on 1 February 2015, in Mogadishu after battling an unspecified illness.

== See also ==
- Kaddare script
- Osmanya script
- Borama script
- Wadaad's writing
- Osman Yusuf Kenadid
- Sheikh Abdurahman Sheikh Nuur
