= Fililwa dialect =

Dialect of the Tumbuka language

- Chifililwa
- Native to: Malawi, Tanzania
- Region: Northern lakeshore communities
- Native speakers: 21,000 (local use)
- Language family: Niger–Congo: Atlantic–Congo; Benue–Congo; Bantoid; Bantu (Zone N); Tumbuka; Fililwa dialect
- Writing system: Latin alphabet and Mwangwego script

Language codes
- ISO 639-3: –
- Guthrie code: N.21 (parent)

Fililwa dialect (Chifililwa) is a lakeshore dialect of the Tumbuka language, spoken mainly in Chitipa, Rumphi and Karonga districts.

== Mutual intelligibility ==
Fililwa is mutually intelligible with standard Tumbuka but features localized pronunciation, conserved older Tumbuka-lakeshore terms, and distinct tone realizations, especially in vocabulary linked to fishing and lake-based community life.
