= Shire Jama Ahmed =

Somali linguist (1936–1999)

- شيري جامع أحمد
- Born: Shire Jaamac Axmed; 1936; Wardheer, Somalia
- Died: 1999 (aged 62–63)
- Education: Al-Azhar University
- Occupations: linguist, writer
- Spouse: Jawaahir Axmed
- Website: shirejama.com

Shire Jama Ahmed (Somali: Shire Jaamac Axmed, Arabic: شيري جامع أحمد; 1936–1999) was a Somali linguist and a scholar. He is notable for creating and developing the modern Latin script for transcribing the Somali language.

== Early years ==
Shire was born in the Dusamareeb region of Somalia to a Marehan family. He grew up in Dhuusamareeb and Abudwak, two of the region's more prominent cities.

== Education ==
In 1940, at about the age of five (the usual age when children first start Qur'anic studies), Shire began learning the Qur'an at his nearby dugsi or madrasah. He continued his religious studies up until 1945. It is widely reported that he attained Kabir or student head. One attains the Kabir designation when one succeeds at memorizing scripture at an above average pace. Here, Shire quickly attained complete knowledge of the Qur'an, which consists of 30 chapters of roughly equal number of verses or volume.

Jama Ahmed, Shire's father, then decided to move his family to Mogadishu, the capital of Somalia. Shire subsequently experienced a considerably different kind of schooling. He started attending local language schools where his peers were learning Arabic and English. While in Mogadishu, he also took up some Italian language studies. As it was his character to excel at most tasks put before him, Shire thrived in all of his academic work.

From 1951 to 1954, Shire matriculated at a college run by former graduates of the prestigious Al-Azhar University in Cairo, Egypt. His studies focused on Arabic and Islamic Law. Later, in 1955, he was part of a group of students who received scholarships to study at Egyptian institutions of higher learning.

=== High school years at Mogadishu's Jamal Abdinasir Secondary School ===
Shire Jama Ahmed graduated from Jamal Abdinasir Secondary School in downtown Mogadishu. The school was also known to Mogadishu residents as Allahi Secondary and Arabic Grammar School.

Teachers and administrators at Jamal Abdinasir Secondary School, a fixture in Mogadishu for more than six decades up until the late 1980s, helped secure for Shire and several dozen other highly motivated students trips to Egypt for further studies in advanced Arabic. Shire eventually earned a degree from Al-Azhar.

=== Studies abroad in Egypt and in Russia ===
After having successfully completed his studies in Egypt, Shire again found himself among a group of students selected for scholarships to study abroad, albeit this time in the Soviet Union. He subsequently graduated from a Russian university in 1967, though his first intention was apparently to attend McGill University in Montreal, Quebec, Canada.

== Career ==
Shire was the first president of the Somali National Academy of Culture, as well as the founder of the first Somali national magazine, The Light of Knowledge and Education.

In addition, he was one of the main organizers and administrators of the Somali Youth League (SYL), a nationalist and youth-oriented political movement that existed in the 1930s through to the late 1960s. Between 1967 and 1969, he also took up the post of Chief Presidential Protocol in the Sharmarke government.

== Language issue ==
For about a decade, there was an effort to find a common orthography for the Somali language, with many Somali scholars working hard to introduce new writing scripts.

Shire, a linguist by training, was a proponent of the use of Latin for transcribing the Somali language, but this preference didn't stop at merely favoring one script over another; Shire also printed many books based on Somali oral culture using a modified Latin script.

Two successive governments, from 1960 to 1967 and 1967–1969, could not settle the debate over what script to use: Arabic, a script which most Somalis had used for centuries and which is featured in the Qur'an, or Latin, a script that only really came to the attention of the Somali people during the late 18th century upon contact with the British and Italian European administrations.

Shire campaigned for the Latin script, while Sheikh Abdurahman Sheikh Nuur, Osman Yusuf Kenadid and Muse Haji Ismail Galal each favored different writing systems for transcribing the Somali language. Originally, there were 18 different scripts that were brought before the newly established Somali Language Committee. Of these 18 proposed orthographies, 11 were new inventions, while 4 were derived from the Arabic script and 3 were Latin.

Anything less than choosing an Arabic alphabet was equated with being a non-Muslim. In fact, a common taunt designed to cast a bad light on those supporting the Latin script was the expression "Latin, laa diin", which translates as "Latin, no religion" (Laa in Arabic means "no" and the word "diin" refers to religion). Shire, on the other hand, was more pragmatic in his arguments. He pointed out that the printing presses and other machines that were then in use in most other parts of the world were mostly set to the Latin alphabet, as were the machines and typewriters already extant within Somalia.

=== Official introduction of the Af-Soomaali script ===
In the late 1960s, Shire and a few other Somali linguists presented before the Somali Language Committee, an organization in charge of settling Somalia's outstanding language issue, and eventually deciding between several prospective orthographies. These scripts ranged from Arabic to some resembling Ge'ez, an ancient Ethio-Semitic writing system. Among those proposed was the Osmanya script, an orthography invented in the early twentieth century by the Majeerteen poet and ruler, Osman Yusuf Kenadid, which had enjoyed a strong following. Shire's competing orthography, for its part, was derived from Latin characters, and it omitted a few letters (p, v and z) to accommodate the unique sounds of the Somali language. Shire also introduced combination letters (kh, dh and sh), which were in many ways exclusive to the language.

The military government, which came to power in October 1969 under the aegis of General Mohamed Siad Barre, took up the agenda. Within a year, the new administration elected to use Shire's refined Latin script as the official writing method for transcribing the Somali language. By 1972, Barre's government began printing more books in Af Soomaali using the new script for primary and high schools alike.

All civil servants were also ordered to learn the Somali language within six months from January of that year. It was further decided that documents in government offices would feature Shire's Latin script.

Although Shire himself was not against the Arabic script, having personally studied the Arabic language while in Mogadishu as well as during his time in Egypt, he did not think it was the most practical solution for solving the nation's lingering language issue.

=== Somali Rural Literacy Campaign ===
After the Somali national script was introduced, the government undertook a massive literacy campaign in villages and rural settlements across the country from 1974 to 1975. This effort was termed in the Somali language Ol Olaha Waxbarashada Reer Miyiga or Somali Countryside Literacy Campaign. The national campaign was carried out by young people, mostly elementary school teachers as well as high school students. This was a relatively easy undertaking as there was now an alphabet to learn.

Many consider the initial introduction of Shire's Somali orthography and the subsequent literacy campaign to be one of the most significant achievements in Somalia's post-colonial administration. Because of this vital decision, decades later, Somali immigrants around the globe are having better luck in learning new languages compared to people coming from countries which use non-Latin writing scripts.

The outside world took note of Somalia's progress in educating the masses in terms of literacy. Julius Nyerere, then Tanzania's president, asserted that "[t]he Somalis are practicing what we in Tanzania preach."

== Publications ==
Shire wrote many works dealing with literacy and Somali culture. All of these publications were produced in either his own printing press or through other printing outfits in Mogadishu.

He published a number of books and pamphlets, with early publications also including periodicals. Shire Jama Ahmed's works include:

- Iftiinka Aqoonta ("The Light of Knowledge") - magazine-format periodical
- Elementary Education Drill Book
- Somali Education and Legal Assistance - prepared for US Peace Corps volunteers
- Halgankii Nolosha ("Life Struggles") National Press, Mogadishu 1974
- Gabayo, Maahmaah, iyo Sheekooyin Yaryar ("Poems, Proverbs, and Short Stories"), Shire Jama Ahmed Personal Press, Mogadishu, 1965

== See also ==
- Somali alphabet
- Musa Haji Ismail Galal
