= Somali National Academy of Culture =

- Established: 1972
- Location: Mogadishu, Somalia
- Director: Shire Jama Ahmed

Somali National Academy of Culture (SNAC), also known as the Somali National Academy of Arts, Sciences and Literature, was an important institution in Somalia that was responsible for the preservation and exploration of national artifacts and other material of national importance.

== Establishment ==
The Somali National Academy of Culture was created to further the Somali cultural repository by collecting and researching all things Somali. In 1969, nine years after the country achieved independence, the Somali central government began many national development projects.

SNAC was born out of the 1972 government decree, which called for a standard orthography for the Somali language. The Somali National Academy and its supporting institutions played an important role when it came to researching and understanding Somali history, culture and folklore. The center's first president was the Somali linguist who invented the Somali National Script, Shire Jama Ahmed.

== Area of responsibility ==
Somali National Academy of Culture collected and stored volumes of material which was previously in the hands of private individuals. SNAC administration and staff had direct collaborations with other higher learning institutions such as the Gaheyr and Lafoole universities. Garhey University later became the Somalia National University (Jaamacada Ummada Soomaaliyeed). Public institutions in Mogadishu including the Somali National University, received significant improvements and expansion throughout the 1970s and 80s.

There were a number of Somali government ministries which housed material for the Somali National Academy of Culture. These ministries included education (Waxbarashada), National Guidance Hanuuninta), higher education (Tacliinta Sare), Movie Agency (Wakaalada Filimada) and other government centers.

== Use as a research center ==
The Somali National Academy of Sciences, Arts and Culture presented any new material among other places, at either the National Theatre (Tiyaatarka Qaranka) or National Museum (Madxafka Qaranka), both situated in Mogadishu. University graduates went to do postgraduate work at the National Academy.

The National Academy contributed in the famous Literacy Campaign in Somalia, where it released and collected new volumes of recorded material, movies, paintings and posters. Later on, by the mid 1970s, university students and foreign researchers found enough material to conduct research at various SNAC run centers.

== See also ==
- Somali Studies
