= Osmanya (Unicode block) =

- Range: U+10480..U+104AF (48 code points)
- Plane: SMP
- Scripts: Osmanya
- Major alphabets: Osmanya Somali
- Assigned: 40 code points
- Unused: 8 reserved code points

Unicode version history
- 4.0 (2003): 40 (+40)

Unicode documentation
- Code chart ∣ Web page

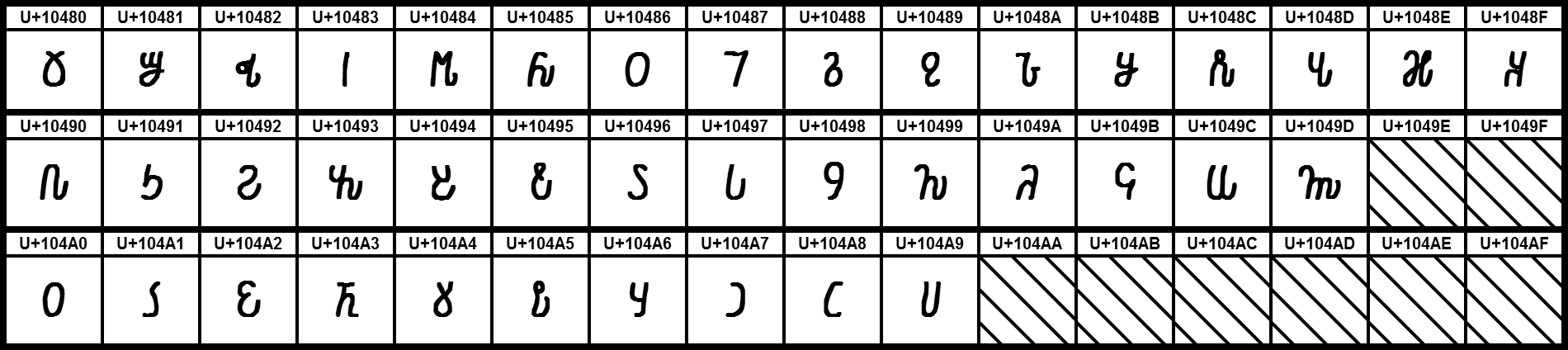
Graphical representation of the Osmanya Unicode block

Osmanya is a Unicode block containing characters for writing the Somali language.

Osmanya^{[1]}^{[2]} Official Unicode Consortium code chart (PDF)
	0	1	2	3	4	5	6	7	8	9	A	B	C	D	E	F
U+1048x	𐒀	𐒁	𐒂	𐒃	𐒄	𐒅	𐒆	𐒇	𐒈	𐒉	𐒊	𐒋	𐒌	𐒍	𐒎	𐒏
U+1049x	𐒐	𐒑	𐒒	𐒓	𐒔	𐒕	𐒖	𐒗	𐒘	𐒙	𐒚	𐒛	𐒜	𐒝		
U+104Ax	𐒠	𐒡	𐒢	𐒣	𐒤	𐒥	𐒦	𐒧	𐒨	𐒩						
Notes: 1. As of Unicode version 16.0; 2. Grey areas indicate non-assigned code points

== History ==
The following Unicode-related documents record the purpose and process of defining specific characters in the Osmanya block:

Version	Final code points (Note: Proposed code points and characters names may differ from final code points and names)	Count	L2 ID	WG2 ID	Document
4.0	U+10480..1049D, 104A0..104A9	40	L2/99-063	N1948	Everson, Michael (1999-01-25), Proposal to encode the Osmanya script in Plane 1 of the UCS
4.0	U+10480..1049D, 104A0..104A9	40	L2/01-271	N2361	Everson, Michael (2001-06-12), Revised proposal to encode the Osmanya script in the SMP of the UCS
4.0	U+10480..1049D, 104A0..104A9	40	L2/01-284	N2361R	Everson, Michael (2001-07-14), Revised proposal to encode the Osmanya script in the SMP of the UCS
4.0	U+10480..1049D, 104A0..104A9	40	L2/01-295R		Moore, Lisa (2001-11-06), "Motion 88-M6", Minutes from the UTC/L2 meeting #88, "The UTC accepts the Osmanya script with the character names as documented in L2/01-284, to be encoded at 10480..104A9."
