= Nolence Mwangwego =

Malawian linguist and inventor of the Mwangwego script

Nolence Moses Mwangwego
- Born: July 1, 1951 (age 75); Mwinilunga District, Northern Rhodesia (now Zambia)
- Other name: Francis Mwangwego
- Education: Livingstonia Mission schools; self-taught in script development
- Occupations: Linguist, educator, inventor
- Era: 20th–21st century
- Employer: French Cultural Center (Blantyre)
- Known for: Creator of the Mwangwego script
- Notable work: A Malawi Tili Pati (2011)
- Title: Village Headman Yaphet Mwakasungula IV
- Awards: Recognition by Malawian Ministry of Culture (2003)
- Website: mwangwego.com

Nolence Moses Mwangwego (born 1 July 1951) is a Malawian linguist, educator, and inventor of the Mwangwego script, an indigenous writing system developed for the Bantu languages of Malawi such as Chitumbuka and Chichewa, and neighboring regions. He is regarded as one of the few modern African inventors of a complete alphabetic system.

== Early life ==
Mwangwego was born in Mwinilunga District, in what was then Northern Rhodesia (modern-day Zambia), to Malawian parents of Tumbuka ancestry. In 1963, his family returned to Malawi, settling in Yaphet Mwakasungula village in Karonga District under the authority of Paramount Chief Kyungu.

== Career ==
Mwangwego became fluent in multiple languages, including Tumbuka, Chewa, Kyangonde, English, French, and Portuguese. He worked as a French teacher at the French Cultural Center in Blantyre.

On 29 December 1997, he was installed as village headman of Yaphet Mwakasungula, assuming the traditional title Yaphet Mwakasungula IV.

== Mwangwego script ==
=== Origins and development ===
Mwangwego conceived the idea of an indigenous Malawian script on 10 November 1977 while in Paris, reflecting on the existence of native words for “to write” in Malawian languages (kulemba in Tumbuka and Chewa). He began designing the system in 1979 and completed the first version on 7 April 1997. The script was officially launched in 2003 after 24 years of development.

=== Structure ===
The Mwangwego script is an abugida, with syllabic characters adapted for Bantu phonology. It includes:

- 32 misisi (syllables with the inherent "a" vowel)
- 32 misiri (syllables with other vowels marked by diacritics)
- 11 mituyo (auxiliary symbols)

It is written left-to-right and designed to represent Malawian languages including Chewa, Tumbuka, and others.

=== Promotion and reception ===
At the 2003 launch, Malawian Minister of Youth, Sports and Culture Kamangadazi Chambalo described it as "history in the making".

Mwangwego personally promoted the script through teaching, lectures, and exhibitions. In January 2007, the "Mwangwego Club" was established to support learners. By the 2010s, several thousand Malawians had acquired some literacy in the script, though it has not yet been widely adopted.

=== Unicode and recognition ===
As of 2025, the script has not been encoded in Unicode, though proposals have been submitted by the Script Encoding Initiative.

== Cultural significance ==
Mwangwego developed the script as a tool of cultural pride and post-colonial identity for Malawians, as well as an alternative to reliance on the Latin alphabet. Scholars view it within the broader phenomenon of modern African script invention.
