= Kamangadazi Chambalo =

Malawian politician

Kamangadzai Kingsley Chambalo is a Malawian politician. He served as a member of parliament and as a minister.

== Political career ==
Under Kamuzu Banda administration, he served as the Minister of Transport and Civil Aviation. He was the Member of Parliament for Lilongwe East from 2004 - 2009 under the United Democratic Front (Malawi) party. He served as Minister of Natural Resources. and was the first Minister of Youth, Sports and Culture in the Bakili Muluzi administration.

In 2019 he joined the United Transformation Movement UTM party.
