= Musa Haji Ismail Galal =

Somali polymath (1917–1980)

- Muuse Xaaji Ismaaciil Galaal
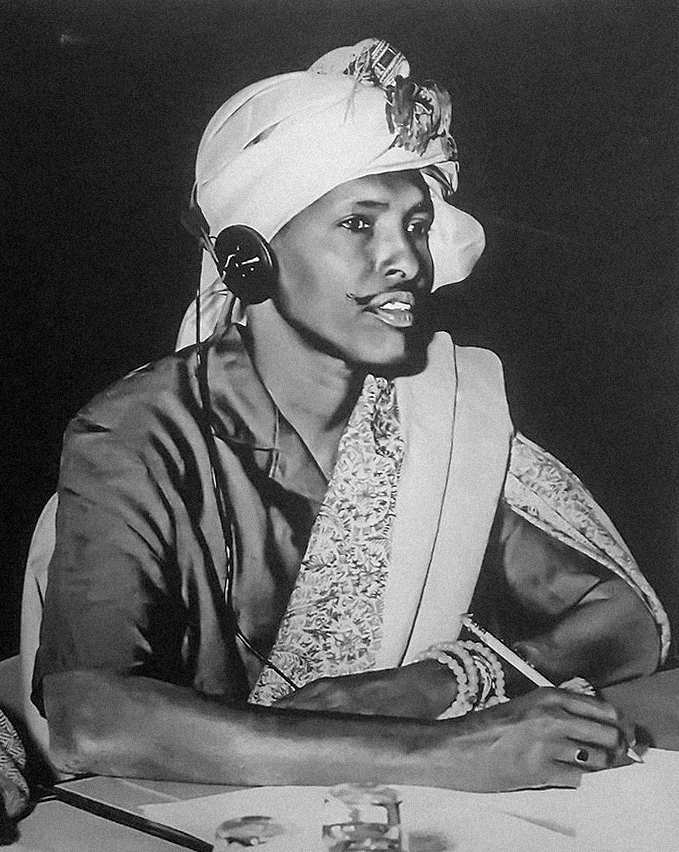
- Born: 1917; Burao, British Somaliland
- Died: 1980 (aged 62–63)
- Occupations: Linguist, historian
- Relatives: Darkest Man (Grandson)
- Writing career
- Period: 1950s-1970s
- Subjects: Somali history and science
- Notable works: The terminology and practice of Somali weather lore, astronomy, and astrology (1968); Stars, seasons and weather in Somali pastoral traditions (1970)

Musa Haji Ismail Galal (Somali: Muuse Xaaji Ismaaciil Galaal, Arabic: موسى الحاج اسماعيل جلال) (1917–1980) was a Somali polymath who was active as a writer, scholar, linguist, poet, historian, anthropologist, and a meteorologist. He is notable for playing a key role in the development of and the creation of Galaal script, a controversial standardized Somali Arabic script which is the only instance where new letters were introduced to an Arabic script with no relation to any of the existing letters.

== Biography ==
Galal was born in 1917 in Burao. He hails from the Habar Jeclo clan of the Isaaq. He is noted for having contributed to the development of Wadaad's script. In the 1950s, Galal introduced a more radical alteration of the Arabic script to represent the Afro-Asiatic Somali language. He came up with an entirely new set of symbols with no relation to any other Arabic letter, for the Somali vowels. I.M. Lewis (1958) considers this to be the most accurate Arabic script to have been devised for the Somali language. Despite this, Galal's script was highly controversial and generally rejected, as the idea of introducing brand new letters was considered too much of a deviation from the Arabic Script. Galal is also the paternal grandfather of well known youtuber and content creator Darkest Man.

Later, he took part in the development of Somali Latin alphabet, along with B. W. Andrzejewski and Shire Jama Ahmed.

A prolific writer, Galal was also among the foremost authorities on the Somali astrological, meteorological and calendrical systems. He devoted two major works to traditional Somali science, both of which are regarded as classics in Somali Studies. He was prolific in recording and writing about Somali poetry and his recordings include the work of Salaan Carrabey.

After a long scholarly career, Galal died in 1980.

In his honour, the Somali Studies Association periodically presents the Musa Galaal Award to Somalists whose work on Somali history and culture has earned distinction.

== Bibliography ==
- The terminology and practice of Somali weather lore, astronomy, and astrology (1968)
- Stars, seasons and weather in Somali pastoral traditions (1970)

== See also ==
- Osman Yusuf Kenadid
- Shire Jama Ahmed
- Salaan Carrabey
