= Borama =

City in Awdal, Somaliland

Borama Boorama (Somali) بورما (Arabic)
- City
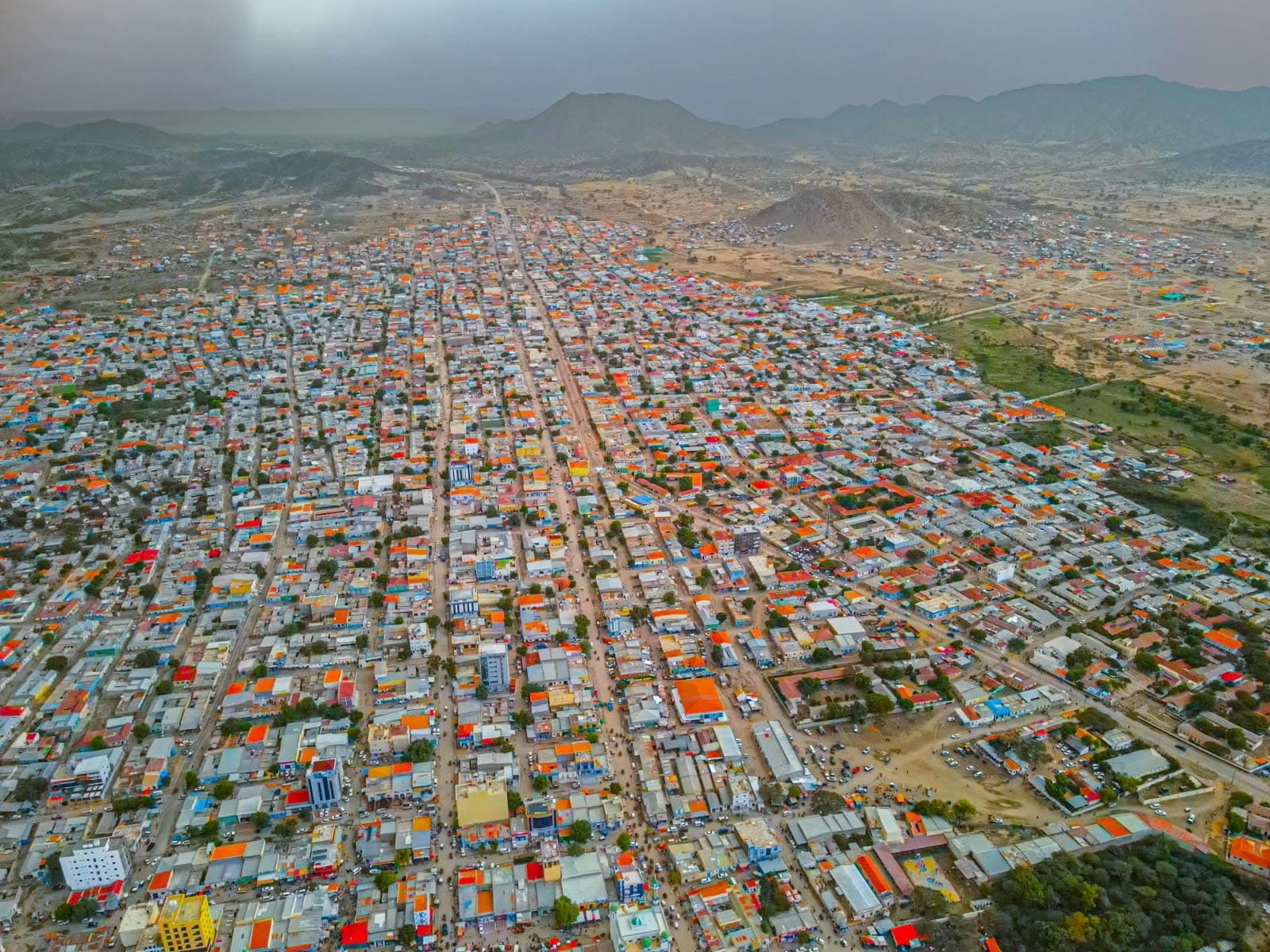
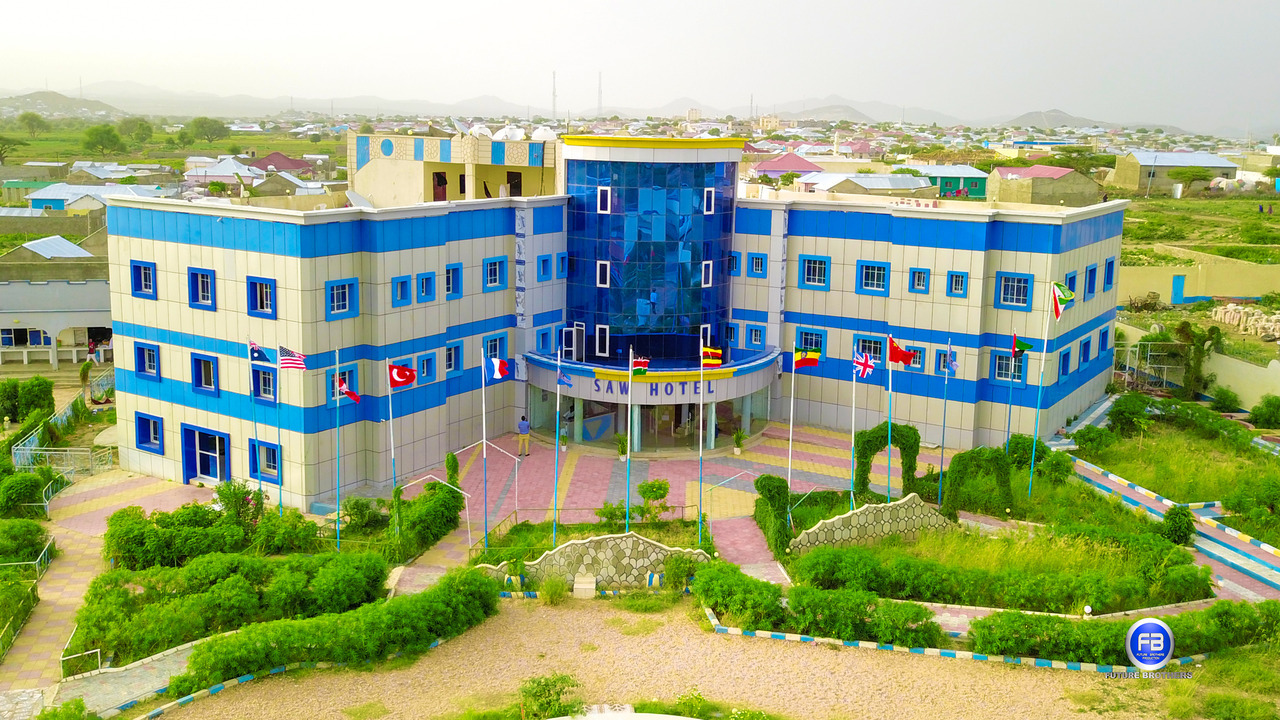
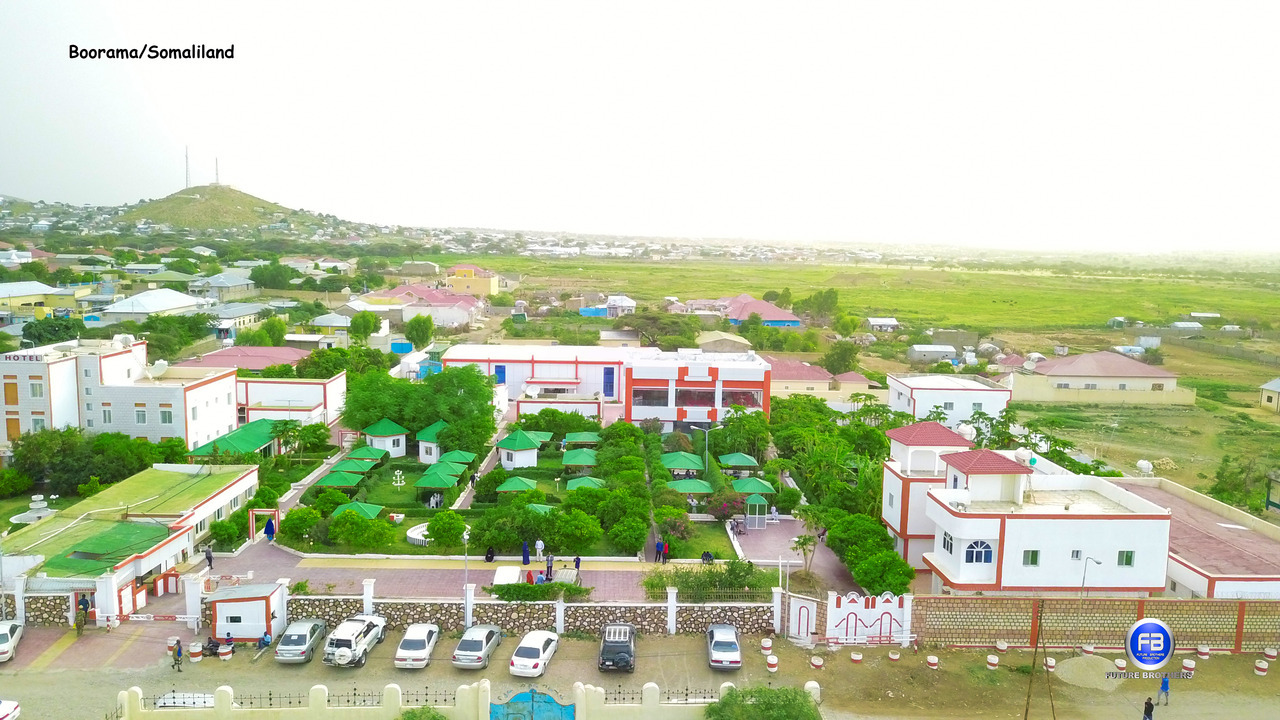
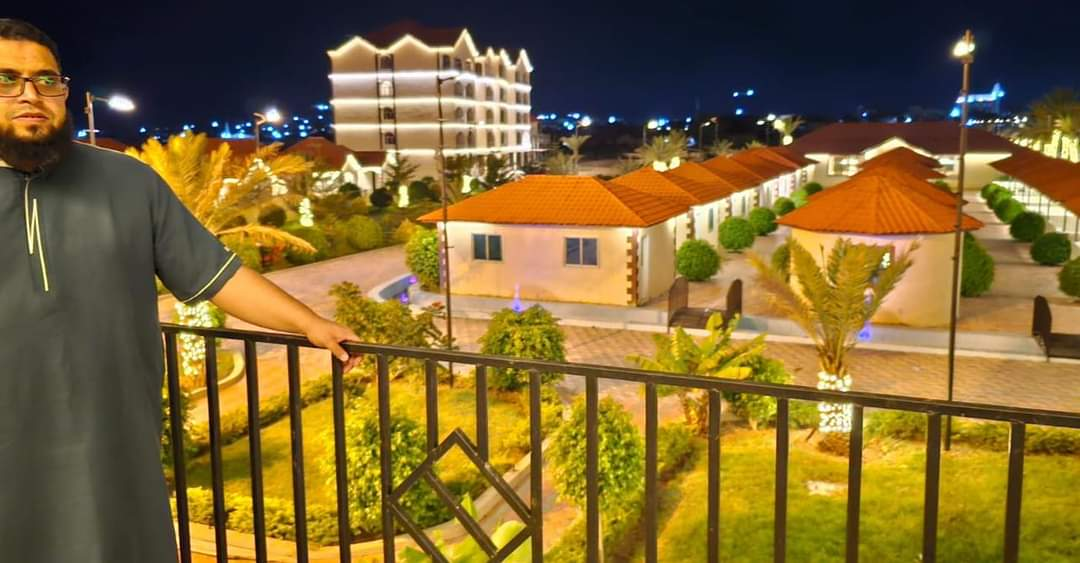
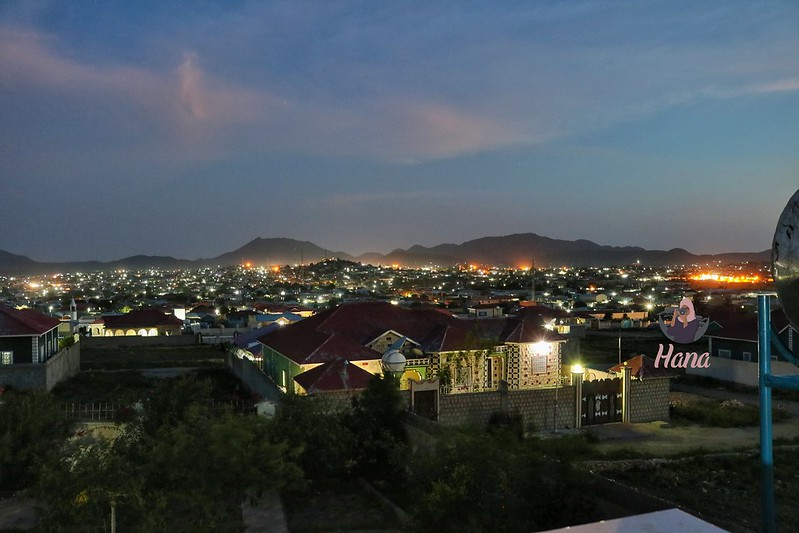
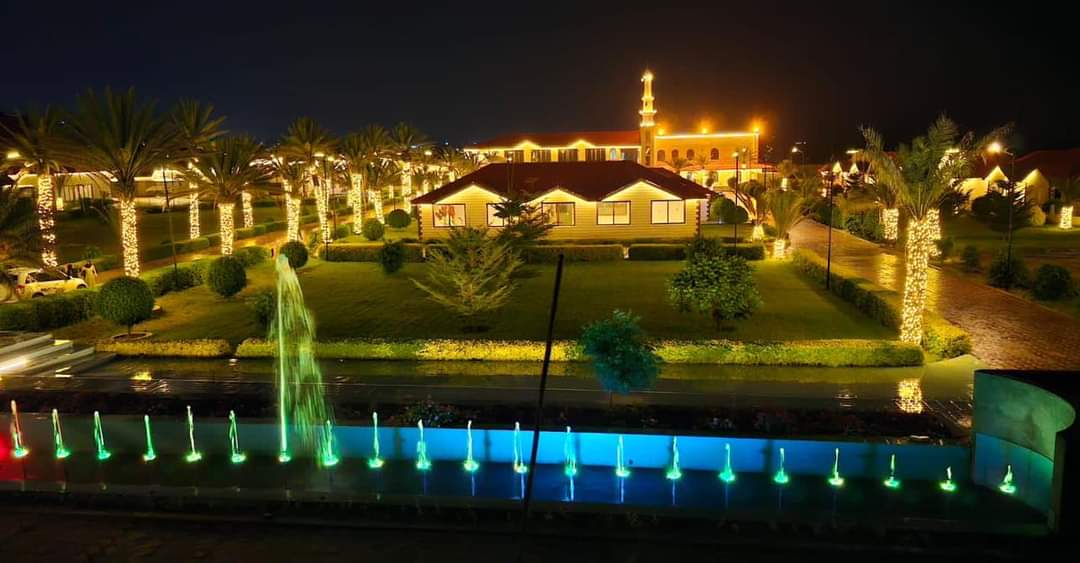
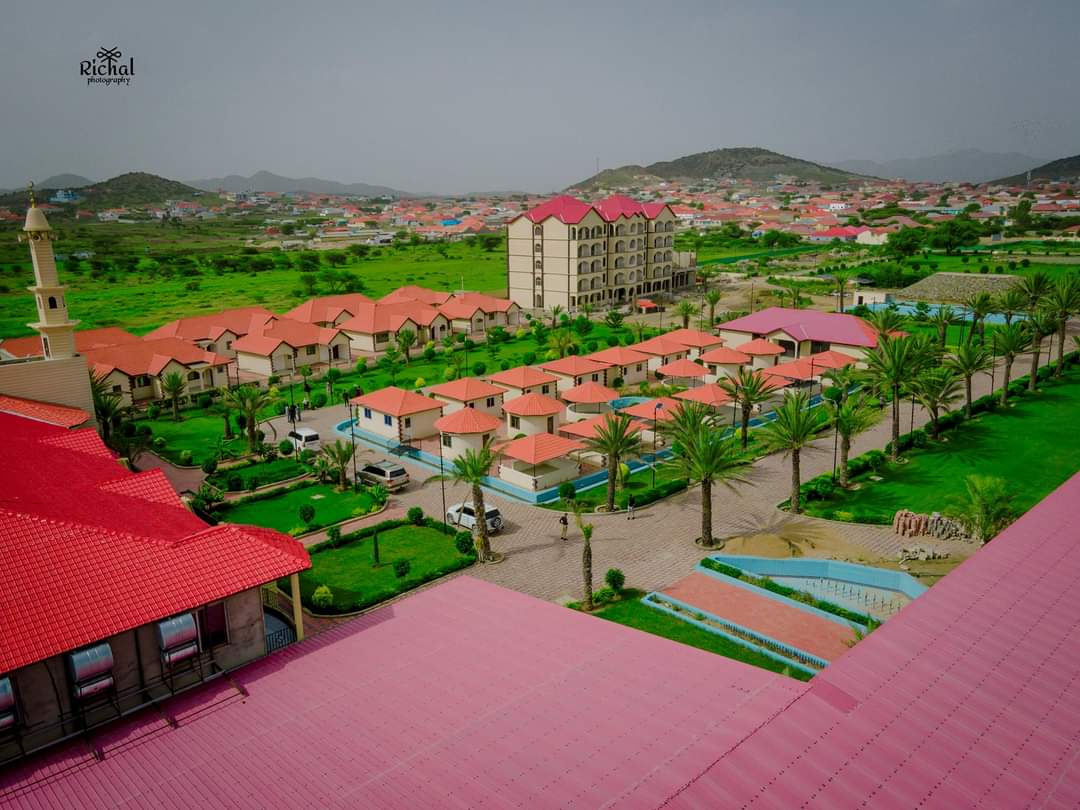
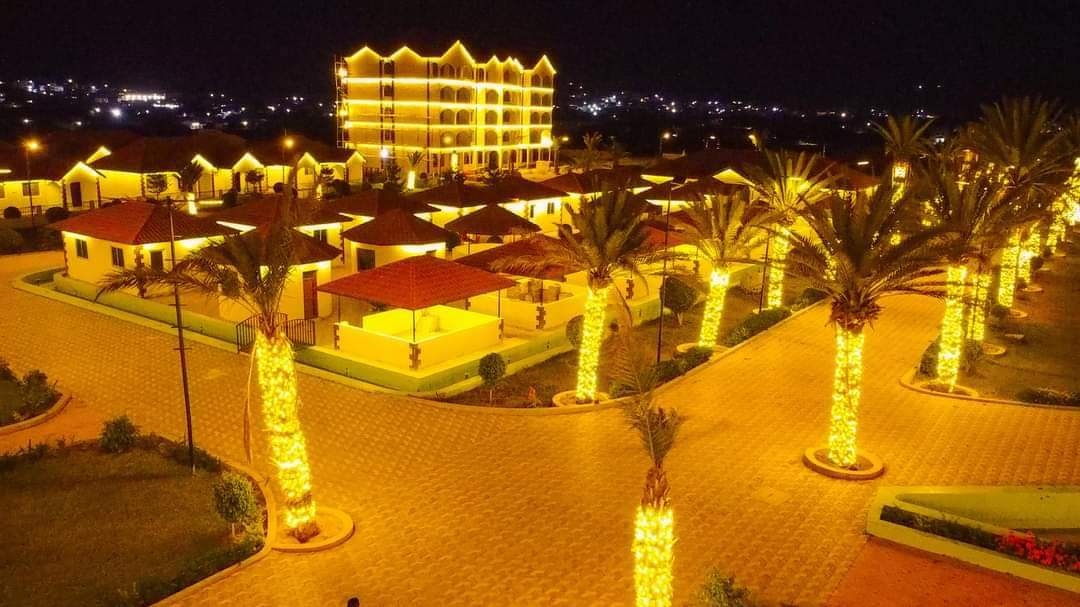

- Flag Local council Seal of Borama

- Location of Borama Borama (Somaliland)
- Coordinates: 9°56′9″N 43°11′3″E
- Country: Somaliland
- Region: Awdal
- District: Borama District

Government
  - Mayor: Mahamud Sh. Ibrahim

Area
  - Total: 3,130 km^{2} (1,210 sq mi)
- Elevation: 1,433 m (4,701 ft)

Population
  - Estimate (2023): 300,000
  - Rank: 2nd
  - Density: 191/km^{2} (490/sq mi)
- Demonym: BOORAMAWI بورماوي
- Time zone: UTC+3 (EAT)
- Area code: +252
- ISO 3166 code: SO-AW
- Climate: BSh

Borama (Somali: Boorama, Arabic: بورما) is the largest city of the northwestern Awdal region of Somaliland. The commercial seat of the province, it is situated near the border with Ethiopia.

During the Middle Ages, Borama was ruled by the Adal Sultanate. It later formed a part of the British Somaliland protectorate in the first half of the 20th century.

According to a 2023 estimate the city had a population of 300,000, with the broader district having a population of 398,609 according to a UN 2014 population estimate. making it one of the largest cities inside Somaliland. It has been a leading example in community organizing, having been the first area in Somaliland to adopt a self-help scheme in the wake of the civil war.

== Etymology ==
The name Borama comes from the word booraan (pl. booraamo), which is a deep hole or geological depression (e.g. basin, valley). The city was named after the valleys in the surrounding areas, with Borama meaning place of valleys.

== History ==
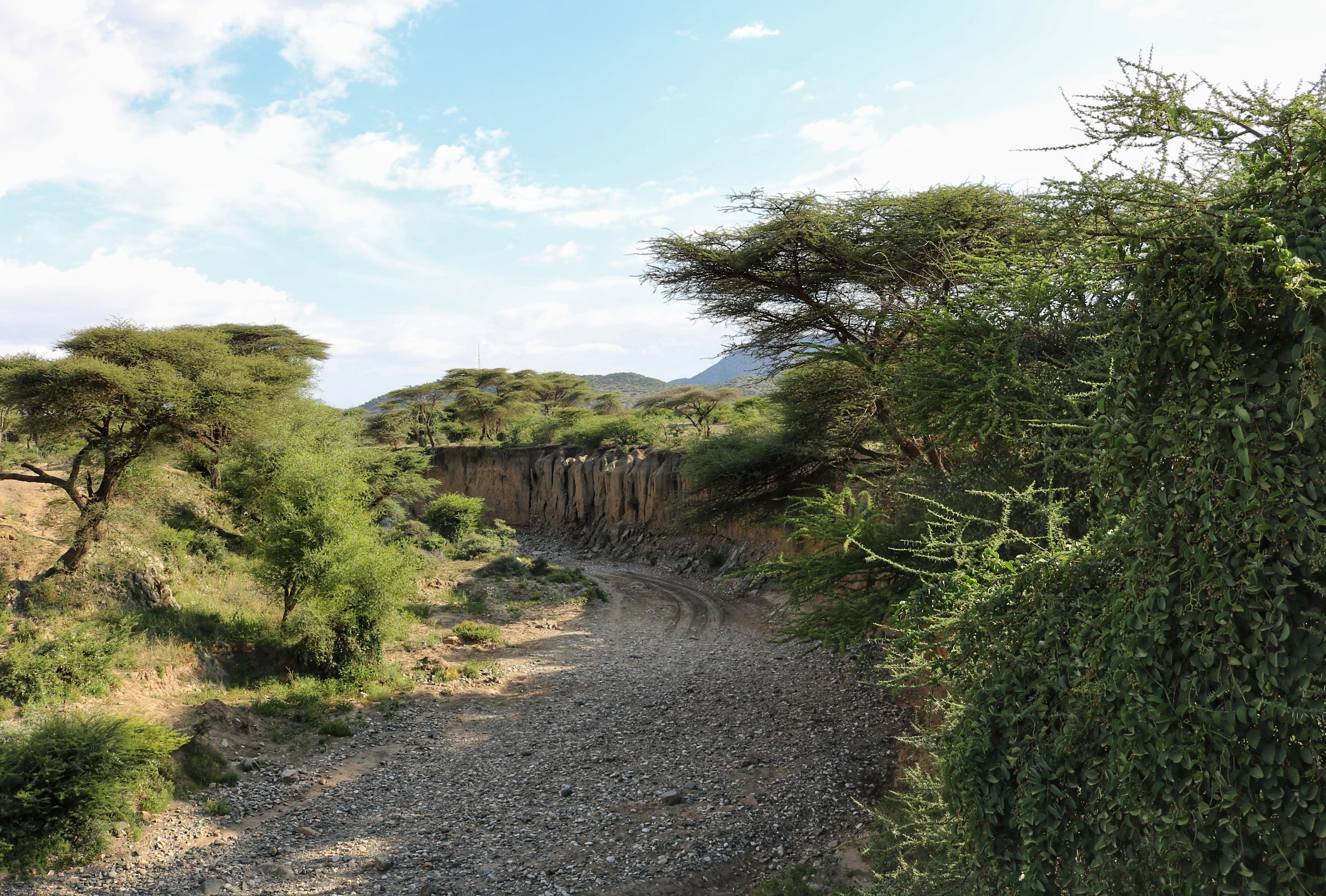
The Qorgab Valley outside Borama

As with several nearby towns such as Amud, numerous archaeological finds have been discovered in the Borama area that point to an eventful past. The latter include ancient remains of tombs, houses and mosques, in addition to sherds of Oriental wares, particularly Chinese porcelain. The artefacts and structures date from various historical periods, ranging from the 12th through to the 18th centuries. Most, however, are from the 15th and 16th centuries, a time of great commercial activity in the region that is associated with the medieval Adal Sultanate.

Excavations in the late 1800s and early 1900s at over fourteen sites in the vicinity of Borama unearthed, among other things, coins identified as having been derived from Kait Bey, the eighteenth Burji Mamluk Sultan of Egypt. Most of these finds were sent to the British Museum for preservation shortly after their discovery.

During the Middle Ages, the region surrounding the Borama area was ruled by the Adal Sultanate. In the first half of the 20th century, Borama formed a part of the British Somaliland protectorate. The modern town of Borama was established in 1921 by Ughaz 'Elmi Warfa, Ughaz of the Gadabuursi, under the directive of the British, who laid its foundations. It was subsequently designated as a district in 1925.

In 1933, Sheikh Abdurahman Sheikh Nuur, a Qur'anic teacher and son of Borama's qadi (judge), devised a new orthography for transcribing the Afro-Asiatic Cushitic Somali language. A quite accurate phonetic writing system, this Borama script was principally used by Nuur, his circle of associates in the city and some of the merchants in control of trade in Zeila and Borama. Students of Sheikh Nuur were also trained in the use of this script. The alphabet is also generally known as the Gadabuursi script.

In the post-independence period, Borama was administered as part of the official Awdal administrative region of Somalia. During the Ogaden War in the late 1970s, Borama was one of several northern cities aerially bombarded by Ethiopian forces who were aligned with the Somali National Movement.

== Geography ==
=== Location and Habitat ===
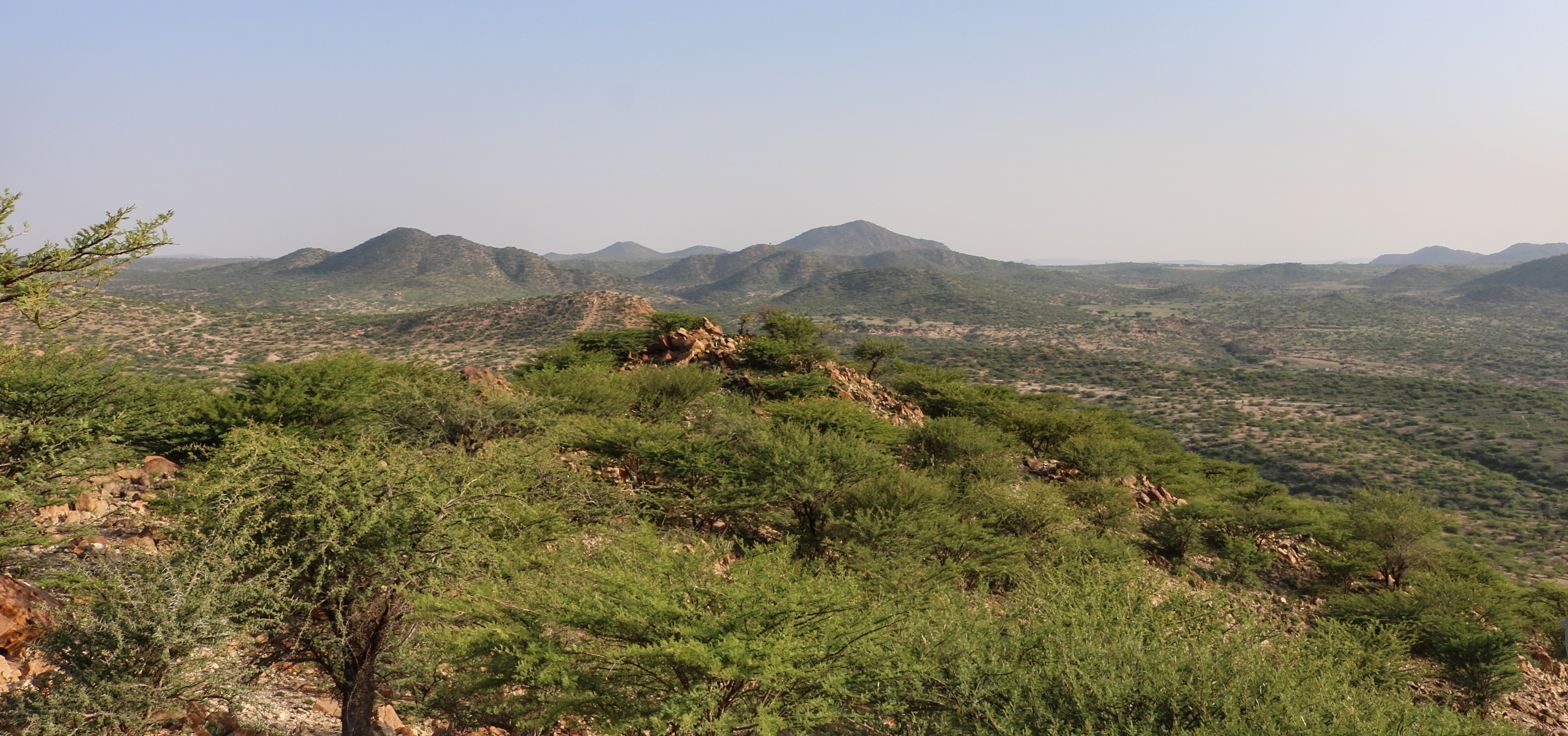
Borama countryside

Borama is situated in a mountainous and hilly area. It has green meadows and fields and represents a key focal point for wildlife. The town's unusual fertility and greenery in the largely arid countryside have attracted many faunas, such as gazelles, birds, and camels.

=== Climate ===
The prevailing climate in Borama is known as a hot semi-arid climate (Köppen BSh). The hottest month of the year is June, with an average temperature of 24.1 °C or 75.4 °F, whilst the coolest month is January, whose average temperature is 17.1 °C or 62.8 °F. The difference in rainfall between the driest month and the wettest month is 110 millimetres or 4.3 inches. The average temperatures vary during the year by 7 °C or 12.6 °F.

Climate data for Borama
Month	Jan	Feb	Mar	Apr	May	Jun	Jul	Aug	Sep	Oct	Nov	Dec	Year
Mean daily maximum °C (°F)	24.6 (76.3)	25.4 (77.7)	27.5 (81.5)	27.8 (82.0)	29.3 (84.7)	30.0 (86.0)	28.8 (83.8)	28.8 (83.8)	29.0 (84.2)	27.4 (81.3)	25.8 (78.4)	24.4 (75.9)	27.4 (81.3)
Mean daily minimum °C (°F)	9.7 (49.5)	11.7 (53.1)	13.8 (56.8)	15.7 (60.3)	17.0 (62.6)	18.3 (64.9)	17.8 (64.0)	17.6 (63.7)	17.3 (63.1)	13.7 (56.7)	11.3 (52.3)	10.4 (50.7)	14.5 (58.1)
Average rainfall mm (inches)	6 (0.2)	21 (0.8)	36 (1.4)	86 (3.4)	61 (2.4)	32 (1.3)	78 (3.1)	112 (4.4)	86 (3.4)	18 (0.7)	10 (0.4)	2 (0.1)	548 (21.6)
Source: Climate-Data.org, altitude: 1,454 metres or 4,770 feet

== Demographics ==
The Awdal Region in which the city is situated is mainly inhabited by the Gadabuursi subclan of the Dir who are especially well represented and considered the predominant clan of the region.

Federico Battera (2005) states about the Awdal Region:

"Awdal is mainly inhabited by the Gadabuursi confederation of clans."

A UN report published by Canada: Immigration and Refugee Board of Canada (1999), states concerning Awdal:

"The Gadabuursi clan dominates Awdal region. As a result, regional politics in Awdal is almost synonymous with Gadabuursi internal clan affairs."

Roland Marchal (1997) states that numerically, the Gadabuursi are the predominant inhabitants of the Awdal Region:

"The Gadabuursi's numerical predominance in Awdal virtually ensures that Gadabuursi interests drive the politics of the region."

Marleen Renders and Ulf Terlinden (2010) both state that the Gadabuursi almost exclusively inhabit the Awdal Region:

"Awdal in western Somaliland is situated between Djibouti, Ethiopia, and the Issaq-populated mainland of Somaliland. It is primarily inhabited by the three sub-clans of the Gadabursi clan, whose traditional institutions survived the colonial period, Somali statehood and the war in good shape, remaining functionally intact and highly relevant to public security."

There is also a sizeable minority of the Issa subclan of the Dir who mainly inhabit the Zeila district.

== Education ==
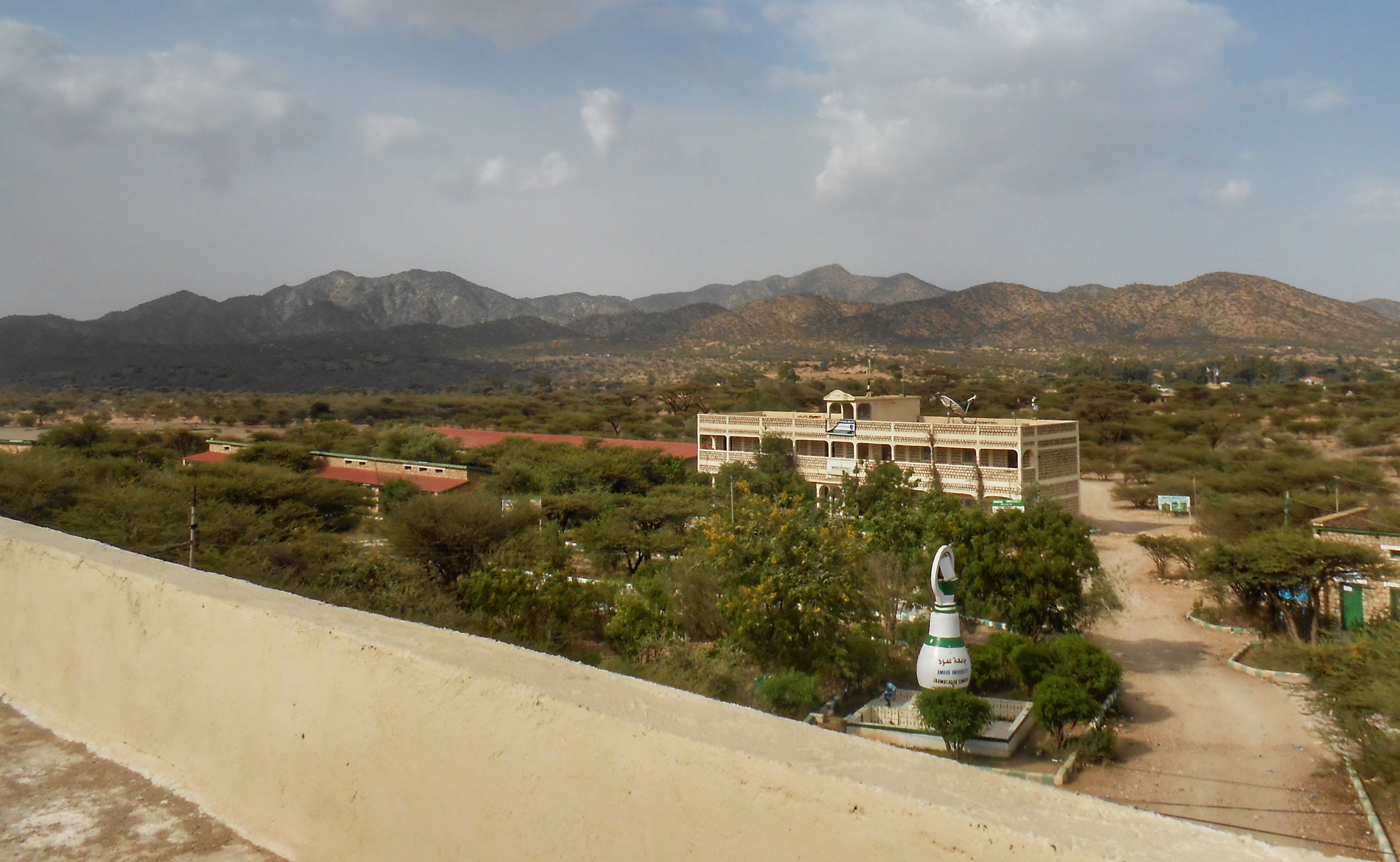
Amoud University

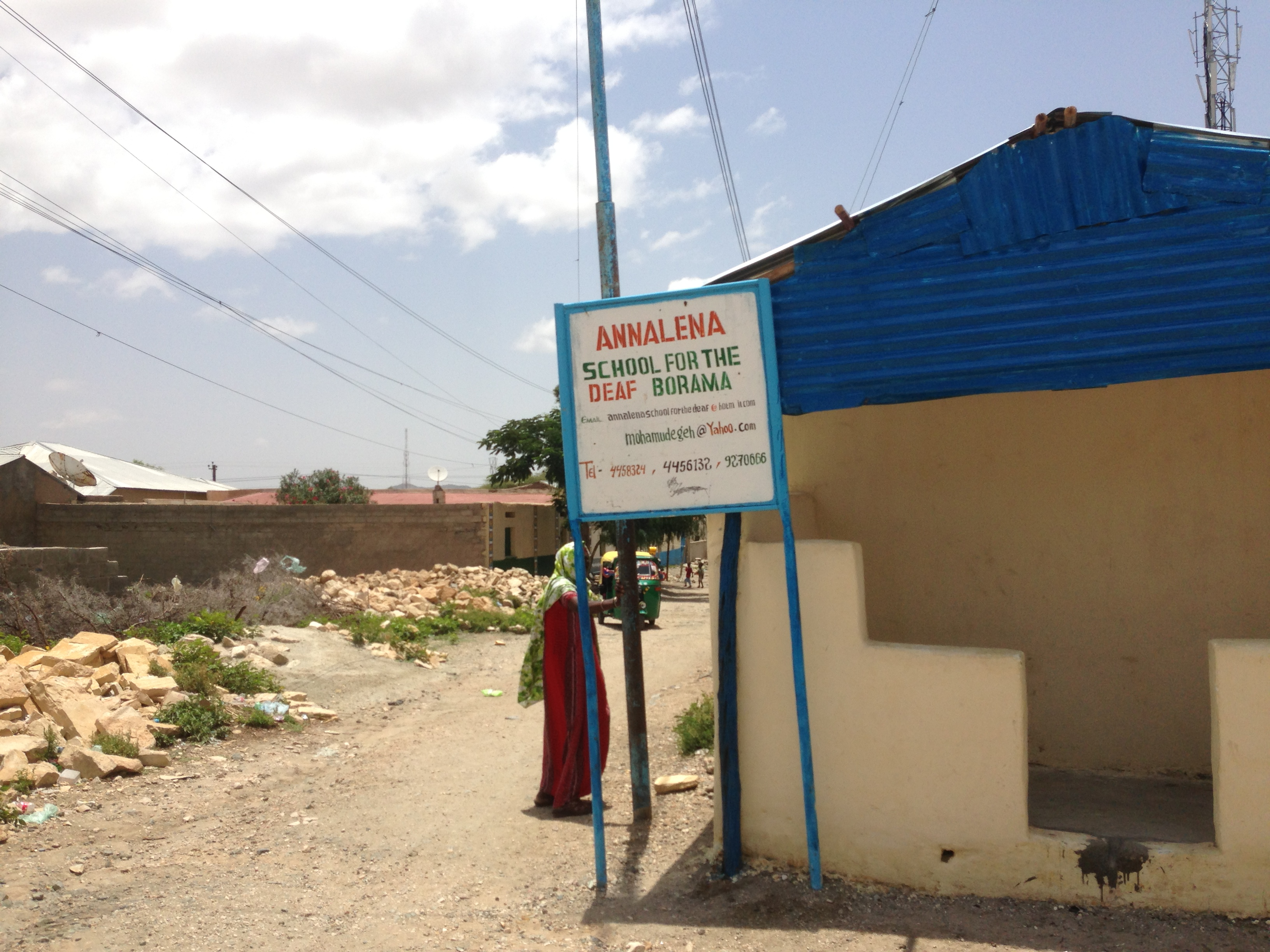
Annalena Deaf School - Borama

Currently, there are 52 primary and secondary schools in Borama. These schools can be divided into three main categories: public primary and secondary schools, private primary and secondary schools and Religious schools.

Total number of students in Borama is 15,314.

== Transportation ==
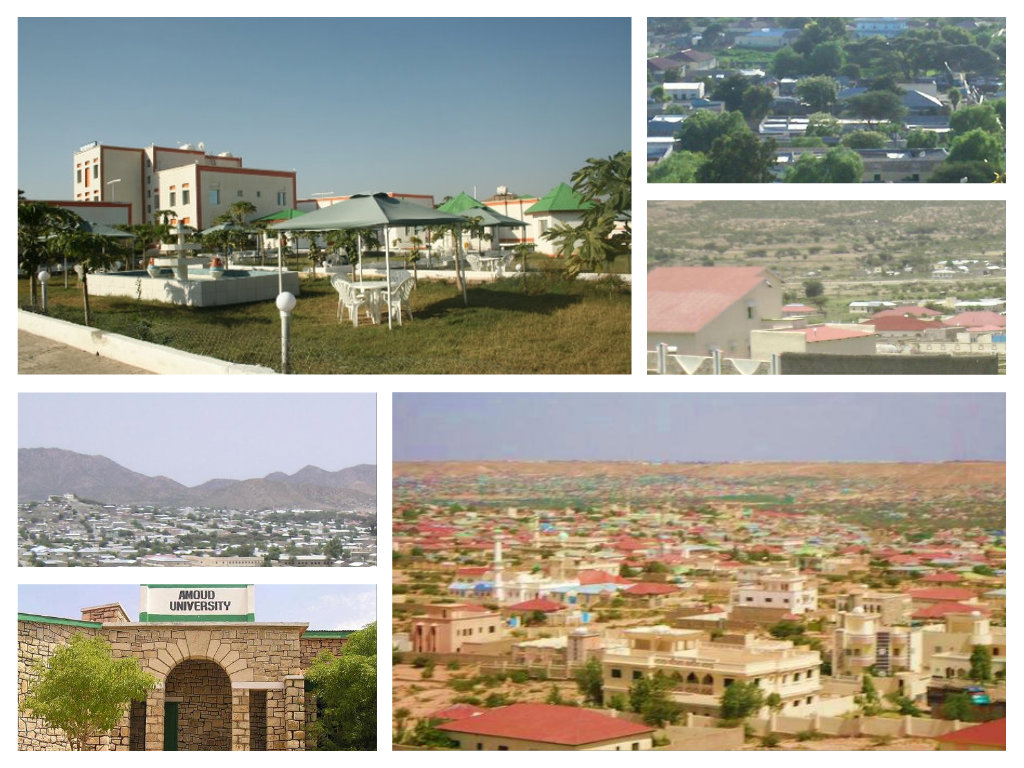
Borama

For air transportation, Borama is served by the Borama International Airport. It is the only airport in the Awdal region. The facility was named in honor of Aden Isaq Ahmed, Somalia's first Minister of Education. The airport is not in use; however, there are plans to rejuvenate it.

== Notable residents ==
- Sheikh Abdurahman Sh. Nur - Inventor of the Gadabuursi Somali Script
- Yussur A.F. Abrar – former Governor of the Central Bank of Somalia
- Hassan Sheikh Mumin - Somali poet, playwright, broadcaster, actor and composer.
- Suleiman Ahmed Guleid - President of Amoud University
- Sh. Abdillahi Sh. Ali Jawhar - Son of Sh. Ali Jawhar and religious leader

== See also ==
- Borama District
- Baki District
- Zeila
- Lughaya
- Dilla
