= Somali Latin alphabet =

Official Somali writing system

Somali
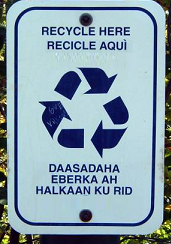
- Sign including instructions written with the Somali alphabet, Minneapolis.
- Script type: Alphabet
- Languages: Somali language

The Somali Latin alphabet is an official writing system in the Federal Republic of Somalia and its constituent Federal Member States. It was developed by a number of leading scholars of Somali, including Musa Haji Ismail Galal, B. W. Andrzejewski and Shire Jama Ahmed specifically for transcribing the Somali language, and is based on the Latin script. The Somali Latin alphabet uses all letters of the English Latin alphabet with the exception of p, v and z. There are no diacritics or other special characters, although it includes three consonant digraphs: dh, kh and sh. Tone is not marked and a word-initial glottal stop is also not shown. Capital letters are used for names and at the beginning of a sentence.

== Form ==
The Somali Latin alphabet is largely phonemic, with consonants having a one-to-one correspondence between graphemes and phonemes. Long vowels are written by doubling the vowel. However, the distinction between tense and lax vowels is not represented; before standardization a cedilla had been used. Diphthongs are transcribed with y or w as the second element (ay, aw, ey, oy and ow); long diphthongs are written with the first vowel doubled. The letter c had originally been superscripted ᶜ on manual typewriters, as an approximation of ⟨ʿ⟩, but came to be written inline when the alphabet was standardized.

As there is no central regulation of the language, there is some variation in orthography, the endings -ay and -ey being particularly interchangeable.

The Somali Latin alphabet, which follows an Arabic-based order, is seen in the following table. The letters' names (with their Arabic equivalents) are spelt out in the following table.

Letter	Name	Arabic equivalent	Pronunciation
ʼ	alef	ء	/ʔ/
B	ba	ﺏ	/b/
T	ta	ﺕ	/t/
J	ja	ﺝ	/d͡ʒ/
X	xa	ﺡ	/ħ/
KH	kha	ﺥ	/χ/
D	da	د	/d/
R	ra	ر	/r/
S	sa	ﺱ	/s/
SH	sha	ﺵ	/ʃ/
DH	dha	ط	/ɖ/
C	ca	ﻉ	/ʕ/
G	ga	گ	/ɡ/
F	fa	ف	/f/
Q	qa	ﻕ	/q/
K	ka	ﻙ	/k/
L	la	ﻝ	/l/
M	ma	ﻡ	/m/
N	na	ن	/n/
W	wa	و	/w/
H	ha	ه	/h/
Y	ya	ﻱ	/j/
A	a		/a/
E	e		/e/
I	i		/i/
O	o		/o/
U	u		/u/
AA	aa		/aː/
EE	ee		/eː/
II	ii		/iː/
OO	oo		/oː/
UU	uu		/uː/

The Somali alphabet lacks equivalents of the Arabic letters thāʼ (ث), dhal (ذ), zāy (ز), ṣād (ص), ḍād (ض), ṭāʾ (ط), ẓāʾ (ظ), and ghayn (غ). Wadaad's Script does have letters for these, which are used for the writing of Arabic loanwords.

The following elements of the Somali alphabet either are not IPA symbols in their lower case versions, or else have values divergent from IPA symbols:

- J –/d͡ʒ/
- X – /ħ/
- KH – /χ/
- SH – /ʃ/
- DH – /ɖ/
- C – /ʕ/
- W – /w/ or the second element in a diphthong
- Y – /j/ or the second element in a diphthong

== See also ==
- Somali alphabets
- Regional Somali Language Academy
