= Wadaad's writing =

Arabic-based orthography for the Somali language

Wadaad's writing (Somali: كتابة وداد, lit. 'Scholar's Handwriting') is a non-standardized adaption of the Arabic script to write the Somali language. Originally, it referred to a non-grammatical Arabic featuring some words from the Somali language, with the proportion of Somali vocabulary varying depending on the context. The Somalis were among the first people in Africa to embrace Islam. Alongside standard Arabic, Wadaad's writing was used by Somali religious men (Wadaado) to record xeer (customary law) petitions and to write qasidas. It was also used by merchants for business purposes and letter writing.

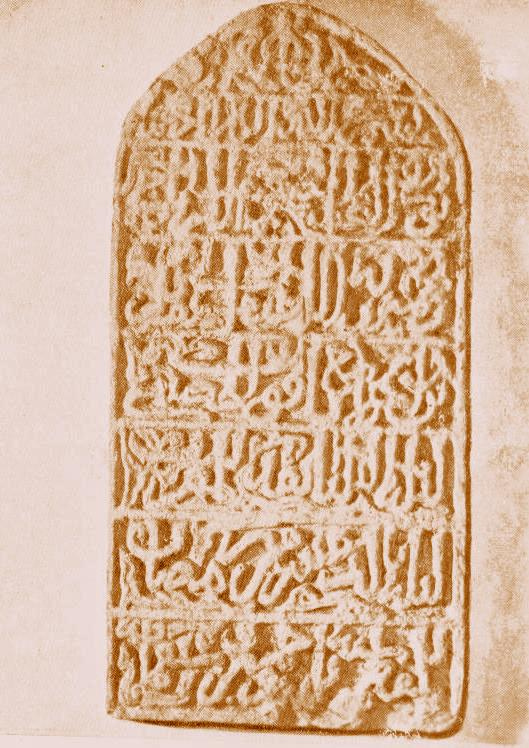
Stone tablet from the 14th-century in Wadaad's writing

Over the years, various Somali scholars improved and altered the use of the Arabic script for conveying Somali. This culminated in the 1930s with the work of Mahammad 'Abdi Makaahiil, standardizing vowel diacritics and orthographic conventions, and in the 1950s with the controversial proposal of Musa Haji Ismail Galal which substantially modified letter values and introduced new letters for vowels.

With the official adoption of Latin Alphabet in 1972, the process of standardization of orthography of Somali Arabic script came to a halt. Makaahiil's orthographic convention remains the most notable final iteration today.

== History ==
The Arabic script was introduced to Somalia in the 10th century by Sheikh Yusuf bin Ahmad al-Kawneyn (colloquially referred to as Aw Barkhadle meaning "Blessed Father") a man described as "the most outstanding saint in Somalia." Of Somali descent, he sought to advance the teachings of the Qur'an. Al-Kawneyn devised a Somali nomenclature for the Arabic vowels, which enabled his pupils to read and write in Arabic. Sheikh Abi-Bakr Al Alawi, a Harari historian, states in his book that Yusuf bin Ahmad al-Kawneyn was of native and local Dir extraction.

Although various Somali wadaads and scholars had used the Arabic script to write in Somali for centuries, it would not be until the 19th century when the Qadiriyyah saint Sheikh Uways al-Barawi of the Digil and Mirifle clan would improve the application of the Arabic script to represent the Maay dialect of southern Somalia, which at the time was close to standard Somali with Arabic script. Al-Barawi modeled his alphabet after the Arabic transcription adopted by the Amrani of Barawa (Brava) to also write the Swahili dialect, Bravanese.

Wadaad's writing was often unintelligible to Somali pupils who learned standard Arabic in government-run schools. During the 1930s in the northwestern British Somaliland protectorate, Mahammad 'Abdi Makaahiil attempted to standardize the orthography in his book The Institution of Modern Correspondence in the Somali language. Following in the footsteps of Sh. Ibraahim 'Abdallah Mayal, Makaahiil therein championed the use of the Arabic script for writing Somali, showing examples of this usage through proverbs, letters and sentences.

=== Neighboring Ajami Scripts ===
Two of the most significant neighboring scripts are the Harari and Swahili Ajami traditions. Old Harari was once the literary language of the most significant hub of Islam in Horn of Africa, the city of Harar. The city is currently the capital of the Harari region of Ethiopia, and is just south of the prominent Somali-speaking city of Dire Dawa. The traditional architecture is well preserved to this day, but more of relevance is that many manuscripts survive from the city's golden age. These manuscripts are among the most well documented instances of Ajami literature in the Horn of Africa.

The Swahili Ajami literature extends as far back as the Islamiziation of the Swahili coast. Though, beginning in the 20th century, a systematic process of "Swahilization" of the Arabic script has been under way by Swahili scribes and scholars. An early attempt was done by Mwalimu Sikujua, a scholar and poet from Mombasa, who built upon the centuries of Arabic script use in the region.

== Galaal Script ==
In 1954, the Somali linguist Musa Haji Ismail Galaal (1917–1980) introduced a more radical alteration of Arabic to represent the Somali Language. Galaal came up with an entirely new set of symbols for the Somali vowels. Galaal's goal was to eliminate the need to use diacritics and also to provide easy to write and read distinction between short vowels and long. Lewis (1958) considered this to be the most accurate Arabic alphabet to have been devised for the Somali language. He had published his work in the Islamic Quarterly, outlining and providing examples as to why a new Arabic based script was needed for use in Somalia.

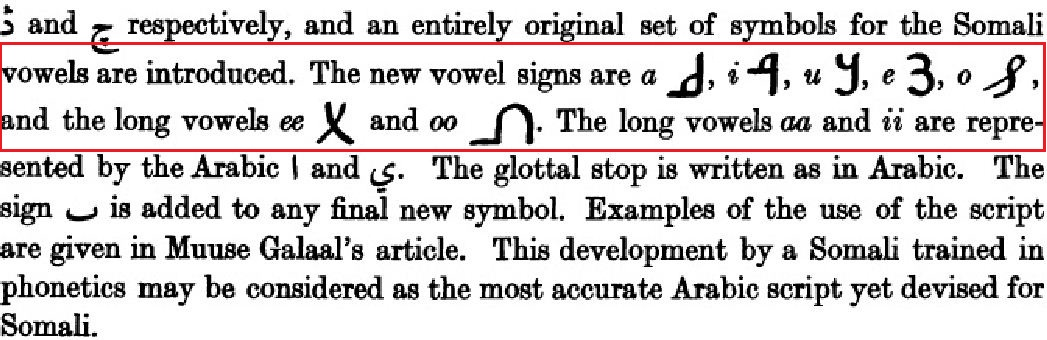
List of newly created letters by Galaal in order to represent vowels

Despite the accuracy of Galaal's writing system and its correspondence with Somali phonology, his writing system turned out to be controversial, facing criticism from Somalia's religiously devout and conservative society. The introduction of new letters was interpreted as deviating away from the Arabic script, and moreover, a worry arose that teaching such new letters can cause difficulty in teaching the Quran to Somali students.

== Mayal/Makaahiil ==
In 1932, Mahammad 'Abdi Makaahiil (Somali: Maxamed Cabdi Makaahiil and in Far Wadaad: مَحَمَّد عَبۡدِ مَكَاهِيل), a Somali scholar who studied at Al-Azhar University, published a short book titled "Inšāʾ al makātibāt al ʿarabiyyah fīl-luġah as-Sūmāliyyah" (Arabic: إنشاء المكاتبات العربية في اللغة الصوماليّة; Creating of Arabic correspondences in the Somali language) in which he printed Somali orthographic conventions as well as several sample letters and many sample proverbs. He built upon earlier work by Ibraahim Cabdullaahi Mayal. In this book, he also argues against those who at the time favored adopting Arabic language as the sole official language of Somalia, and he argued strongly for adopting Arabic Script for Somali language.

Makaahiil's proposed orthography uses the same letters as in Arabic, with only two additional letters, ڎ for /ɖ/ and گ for /g/. On the other hand, there are 8 consonants in Arabic alphabet that do not exist in Somali language (except for writing Arabic loanwords), which include the letters thāʼ (ث), dhal (ذ), zāy (ز), ṣād (ص), ḍād (ض), ṭāʾ (ط), ẓāʾ (ظ), and ghayn (غ).

This writing convention relies on vowel diacritics.

Somali Arabic Alphabet
| Name | Forms | | | | Sound represented | Latin equivalent | Notes |
| Name | Isolated | Final | Medial | Initial | Sound represented | Latin equivalent | Notes |
|---|---|---|---|---|---|---|---|
| alif الف | ا | ـا | | | / /a/ | - | alif has two functions, first as vowel carrier for vowels at the beginning of words. Second for showing long vowel "aa". |
| baa با | ب | ـب | ـبـ | بـ | /b/ | b | |
| paa پا | پ | ـپ | ـپـ | پـ | /p/ | p | used in the Maay dialect. |
| taa تا | ت | ـت | ـتـ | تـ | /t/ | t | |
| thaa ثا | ث | ـث | ـثـ | ثـ | /s/,/θ/ | s,th | Not used in native Somali words; mainly used in Arabic loanwords. When used in Maay, it is pronounced as /θ/, "th". |
| jīm جيم | ج | ـج | ـجـ | جـ | /d͡ʒ/ | j | |
| jhaa چا | چ | ـچ | ـچـ | چـ | /ʄ/ | jh | used in the Maay dialect. |
| xaa حا | ح | ـح | ـحـ | حـ | /ħ/ | x | |
| khaa خا | خ | ـخ | ـخـ | خـ | /χ/ | kh | |
| daal دال | د | ـد | | | /d/ | d | |
| dhaal ذال | ذ | ـذ | | | /d/ | d | Not used in native Somali words; mainly used in Arabic loanwords. |
| dhaa ڎا | ڎ | ـڎ | | | /ɖ/ | dh | Additional letter not present in Arabic; Also historically represented by ط |
| raa را | ر | ـر | | | /r/ | r | |
| zaay زاي | ز | ـز | | | /z/ | z | |
| siin سين | س | ـس | ـسـ | سـ | /s/ | s | |
| shiin شين | ش | ـش | ـشـ | شـ | /ʃ/ | sh | |
| saad صاد | ص | ـص | ـصـ | صـ | /s/ | s | Not used in native Somali words; mainly used in Arabic loanwords. |
| dhaad ضاد | ض | ـض | ـضـ | ضـ | /d/ | d | Not used in native Somali words; mainly used in Arabic loanwords. |
| taa طا | ط | ـط | ـطـ | طـ | /t/, /ɖ/ | t, dh | Not used in native Somali words; mainly used in Arabic loanwords. Also historically used for representing "dh" instead of ڎ |
| dhaa ظا | ظ | ـظ | ـظـ | ظـ | /d/~/z/ | d, z | Not used in native Somali words; mainly used in Arabic loanwords. Some such loan words are written in Latin with "z", others with "d". |
| cayn عين | ع | ـع | ـعـ | عـ | /ʕ/ | c | |
| ghayn غين | غ | ـغ | ـغـ | غـ | /ɣ/~/g/, /ɠ/ | g, gh | Not used in native Somali words; mainly used in Arabic loanwords. When used in the Maay dialect it represents /ɠ/, "gh" |
| nyaa ݝا | ݝ | ـݝ | ـݝـ | ݝـ | /ɲ/ | yc | Used in Maay Dialect. |
| ghayng غيڠ | ڠ | ـڠ | ـڠـ | ڠـ | /ŋ/ | ng | Used in the Maay dialect. Occurs exclusively at the end of syllables. |
| faa فا | ف | ـف | ـفـ | فـ | /f/ | f | |
| qaaf قاف | ق | ـق | ـقـ | قـ | /q/ | q | |
| kaaf كاف | ك | ـك | ـكـ | كـ | /k/ | k | |
| gaa گا | گ | ـگ | ـگـ | گـ | /ɡ/ | g | Additional letter not present in Arabic. |
| laam لام | ل | ـل | ـلـ | لـ | /l/ | l | |
| miim ميم | م | ـم | ـمـ | مـ | /m/ | m | |
| nuun نون | ن | ـن | ـنـ | نـ | /n/ | n | |
| waw واو | و | ـو | | | /w/ /ɞ:/, /ɔ:/, /ʉ:/, /u:/ | w and oo, uu | The letter waw serves two functions. First is as a semivowel, with a sound [w]. Second is in writing of long vowels "oo" and "uu". |
| haa ها | ه | ـه | ـهـ | هـ | /h/ | h | |
| yaa يا | ي | ـي | ـيـ | يـ | /j/ /e:/, /ɛ:/, /i:/, /ɪ:/ | y, ee, ii | The letter yaa serves two functions. First is as a semivowel, with a sound [j]. Second is in writing of long vowels "ee" and "ii". |
| hamzah همزة | ء | | | | /ʔ/ | ’ | |

As for vowels, in Somali phonology, there are five vowel articulations. These vowel articulations can either be short or long. Each vowel also has a harmonic counterpart, expressed either at the front or at the back of the mouth. Somali words follow a vowel harmony rule. However, Somali orthography, neither Somali Latin alphabet, nor Arabic alphabet, nor Osmanya alphabet distinguish between the two vowel harmony sets.

A shortcoming of the Arabic script for Somali language, is that while Somali has 5 vowels, Arabic has 3. This was where, Galaal got the most creative, coming up with brand new letters to represent vowels. In the 1961 Somali Language Committee Report, several other Arabic proposals were also listed, where other solutions were proposed for showing the 5 short vowels and 5 long vowels. None of these other proposals gained traction.

In Mahammad 'Abdi Makaahiil's orthographic convention, he added two new diacritics. For short vowel sounds [a], [u], and [i], Arabic diacritics are used. For long vowel sounds [a:], [u:], and [i:], similar to Arabic, the letters alif (ا), wāw (و), and yāʾ (ي) respectively.

For the short vowel sound [e], Makaahil interpreted the sound to be in between [a] and [i], thus he proposed to combine "◌َ " (Fatha, [a]) and "◌ِ" and (Dhamma, [i]), and write "◌َِ". As for long vowel sound [e:], it'd be written as "◌َِ" followed by yāʾ (ي).

Vowel diacritics in Somali Arabic Alphabet
| -a | -e | -i | -o | -u |
|---|---|---|---|---|
| ◌َ | ◌َِ | ◌ِ | ◌ٗ | ◌ُ |

Long vowels in Somali Arabic Alphabet
| -aa | -ee | -ii | -oo | -uu |
|---|---|---|---|---|
| ـا | ◌َِيـ / ◌َِي | يـ / ي | ◌ٗو | و / ـو |

Vowels, when occurring at the beginning of words, are placed on top of alif (ا). Long vowels are written as they would in the middle of the word, except that wāw (و), and yāʾ (ي) would be preceded by alif instead of another consonant.The exception to this convention is long vowel [aa], where similar to Arabic, alif madda (آ) is used.

Vowel in the beginning of words in Somali Arabic Alphabet
| Short vowels | | | | | Long vowels | | | | |
| A | E | I | O | U | Aa | Ee | Ii | Oo | Uu |
|---|---|---|---|---|---|---|---|---|---|
| اَ | اَِ | اِ | اٗ | اُ | آ | اَِيـ / اَِي | اي | اٗو | او |

== Af Maay Script Amendments ==
Af Maay is a prominent dialect of Somali spoken mainly between the Jubba and Shabelle rivers. The dialect ranges between being very understandable to neighboring speakers of Standard, Af Maxaa, Somali, to being incomprehensible upon first exposure to more distant speakers of Af Maxaa Somali. Maay dialect scholars found a need to further specify the Arabic script for their dialect and began using the following standard.

Af Maay Specific Arabic Letters
| Name | Forms | | | | Sound represented | Latin equivalent | Latin Script | Arabic Script | Standard Maxaa Dialect | Arabic Script | English |
| Name | Isolated | Final | Medial | Initial | Sound represented | Latin equivalent | Latin Script | Arabic Script | Standard Maxaa Dialect | Arabic Script | English |
|---|---|---|---|---|---|---|---|---|---|---|---|
| paa پا | پ | ـپ | ـپـ | پـ | /p/ | p | heped | هَِپَِد | xabad | حَبَد | chest |
| thaa ثا | ث | ـث | ـثـ | ثـ | /θ/ | th | etheb | اَِثَِب | edeb | اَِدَِب | politeness |
| jhaa چا | چ | ـچ | ـچـ | چـ | /ʄ/ | jh | jhab | چَب | jab | جَب | break |
| ghayn غين | غ | ـغ | ـغـ | غـ | /ɠ/ | gh | haghar | هَغَر | hagar | هَگَر | deceive |
| nyaa ݝا | ݝ | ـݝ | ـݝـ | ݝـ | /ɲ/ | yc | nyaanyuur | ݝانْݝور | yaanyuur | يانْيور | kitten |
| ghayng غيڠ | ڠ | ـڠ | ـڠـ | ڠـ | /ŋ/ | ng | angkaar | اَڠْكار | ankaar | اَنْكار | curse |

Vowel diacritics in Maay Arabic Alphabet
| -a | -e | -i | -o | -u | -y |
|---|---|---|---|---|---|
| ◌َ | ◌َِ | ◌ِ | ◌ٗ | ◌ُ | ◌ٛ |

The additional vowel never appears in the long form, and often isn't needed for legibility. However, many Maay writers prefer to make use of it. For example, barwaaqo (بَرواقٗ) is often rendered as barwaaghy (بَرواغٛ) in Maay to further specify the vowel quality and stress differences from standard Somali. The ⟨y⟩ vowel is often akin to /e/ or /o/ in vowel quality, and many neighboring dialects of Standard Somali pronounce these words exactly the same yet write them using the standard conventions. Maay's most frequent use of ⟨y⟩ is in place of the verb ending diphthong /aj/. Neighboring dialects pronounce that diphthong as the short /e/, close to how Maay does. Though Maay makes much broader use of this vowel reduction and thus found a need by its speakers to specifically mark it.

== Revision by J. S. King ==
In 1887, British writer, J. S. King wrote for the Indian Antiquary an article titled "Somali as a written language" in which he proposes a standard Arabic based Somali script. Some of the main changes and features were the combined use of both Arabic and Sanskrit features:

- The Somali ⟨dh⟩ sound is represented as a new character with influence from both ⟨ड⟩ and ⟨د⟩
- A new ⟨r⟩ letter is assigned which also seems to have been fused from ⟨ड़⟩ and ⟨ر⟩
- Somali ⟨g⟩ in this case is written as ⟨گ⟩
- A new ⟨l⟩ is introduced, with Sanskrit elements to form ⟨ڸ⟩
- Finally, a new ⟨n⟩ is proposed with two dots above the standard Arabic ⟨ن⟩

King had also reformed the vowel structure, by introducing separate vowel markers for the Somali ⟨o⟩ and ⟨e⟩.

In this article, he provided over 100 examples of the script in use, some of which include:

| King's script | Standard Arabic script | Somali transliteration | English translation |
|---|---|---|---|
| مَ نَبَدبَ | مَ نَبَد با | Ma nabad ba | Are you well? |
| اَفكي صوماليَِيد كُهَدَل | اَفكي سوماليَِيد كُ هَدَل | Afkii Soomaaliyeed ku hadal | Speak in the Somali language |
| ادِگَ وَِلي ارد الهندي مَتَِگْتي | ادِگَ وَِلِ اَرد اَلهِندِيَ (ڎُلكَ هِندِيا) مَتَِگْتي | Adiga weli ard alhindiya (dhulka hiindiya) ma tegtay? | Have you ever been to India? |

== Sample text ==
Article 1 of the Universal Declaration of Human Rights

| Translation | Latin Script | Wadaad's Writing (Mayal/Makaahiil) |
|---|---|---|
| All human beings are born free and equal in dignity and rights. They are endowed with reason and conscience and should act towards one another in a spirit of brotherhood. | Aadanaha dhammaantiis wuxuu dhashaa isagoo xor ah, kana siman xagga sharafta iyo xuquuqada Waxaa Alle (Ilaah) siiyay aqoon iyo wacyi, waana in qof la arkaa qofka kale ula dhaqmaa si walaaltinimo ah. | آدَنَهَ ڎَمّانْتيس وُحو ڎَشا اِسگٗو حٗر اَه، كَنَ سِمَن حَگَّ شَرَفتَ اِيٗ حُقوقَدَ وَحا الله سييَي اَقٗون اِيٗ وَعْيِ، وانَ اِن قٗف لَ اَركا قٗفكَ كَلَِ اُلَ ڎَقْما سِ وَلالتِنِمٗ اَه. |

== Far Qur’aanka Script ==
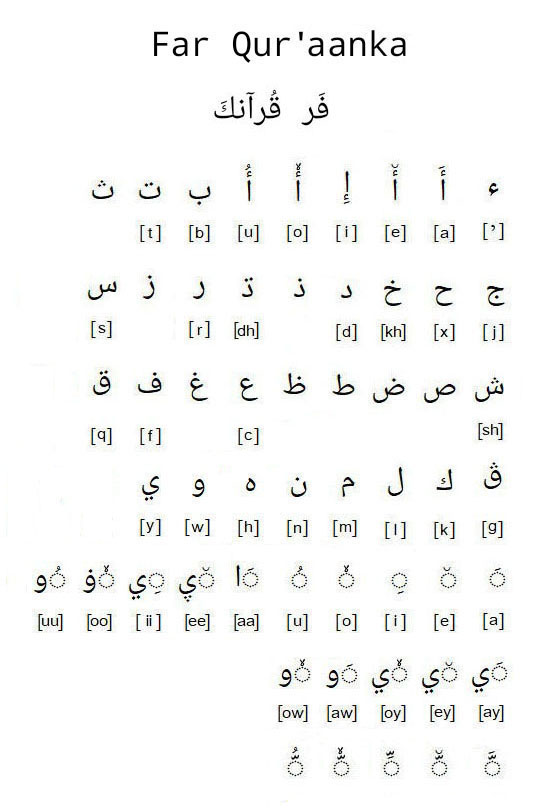

Far Qur’aanka (Qur’an Script) is a proposed writing system developed by Somali researcher and designer Ali Farah. It was created to serve as a unified script for writing the Somali language while maintaining compatibility with Qur’anic reading. The system was conceived to address the limitations of previous attempts to adapt the Arabic script for Somali, which often failed to represent Somali phonology accurately. To overcome these issues, Far Qur’aanka introduces a set of modifications that aim to combine linguistic precision with religious functionality.

Features

- Designed to be easily readable and writable by Somali speakers.
- Accommodates Somali phonological features while preserving Qur’anic orthography.
- Differs from earlier efforts that merely modified Arabic letters without full adaptation.
- Intended for both everyday Somali writing and Qur’anic use.

== See also ==
- Osmanya alphabet – Script created in the 1920s for Somali
- Borama alphabet – Writing system for Somali developed around 1933
- Kaddare alphabet – Writing system for Somali created in 1952
