= Gadabuursi Somali Script =

Writing system for Somali developed around 1933

Borama
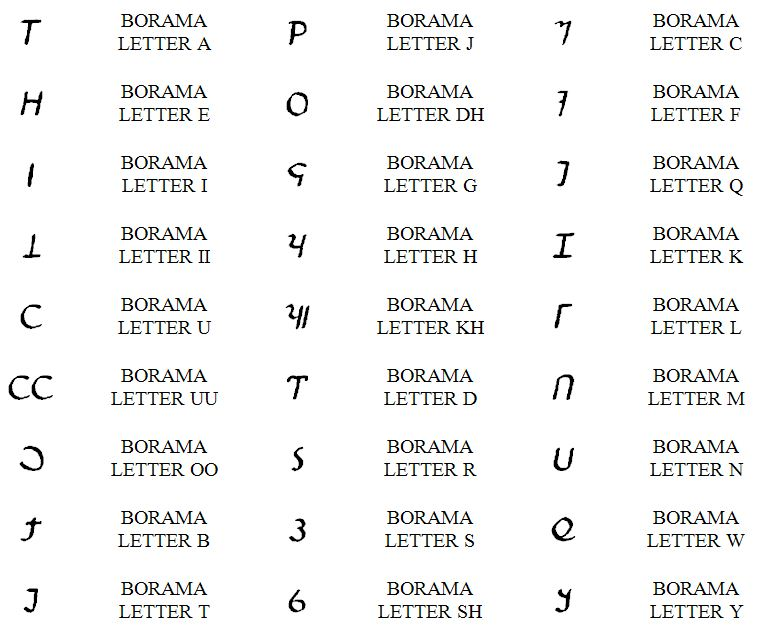
- Script type: Alphabet
- Languages: Somali language

The Gadabuursi script, also known as the Borama script (Borama: ), is an alphabetic script for the Somali language. It was devised around 1933 by Sheikh Abdurahman Sheikh Nuur of the Gadabuursi clan, and principally used in and around his home town of Borama.

== History ==
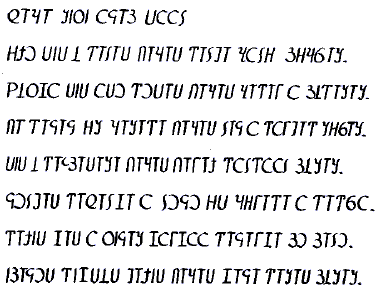
A qasida in the Borama script.

Though not as widely known as Osmanya, the most popular script invented for Somali, Borama has produced a notable body of literature mainly consisting of qasidas.

The Borama or Gadabuursi script was devised in 1933 by Sheikh Abdurahman Sheikh Nuur, a Qur'anic teacher and son of Borama's qadi (judge), who devised the new orthography for transcribing the Afro-Asiatic Cushitic Somali language. A quite accurate phonetic writing system, it was principally used by Sheikh Nuur, his circle of associates in the city and some of the merchants in control of trade in Zeila and Borama. Students of Sheikh Nuur were also trained in the use of this alphabet.

== See also ==
- Kaddare
- Osmanya
- Somali orthography
