= Mwangwego script =

Abugida writing system developed for Malawian languages

Mwangwego
- Script type: Abugida
- Creator: Nolence Mwangwego
- Period: 1977–present
- Direction: Left-to-right
- Languages: Chewa, Tumbuka and other Bantu languages of Malawi

The Mwangwego script is an abugida writing system developed for Malawian languages and other African Bantu languages by linguist Nolence Mwangwego in 1977. It is one of several indigenous scripts invented for local language communities in Africa.

== History ==
=== About the creator ===
Nolence Moses Mwangwego was born on July 1, 1951, in Mwinilunga District in what was then Northern Rhodesia (now modern Zambia); his roots come from Yaphet Mwakasungula village in the area of Paramount chief Kyungu in Karonga District of the former Nyasaland (now modern Malawi). He speaks and writes Chewa, Tumbuka, Kyangonde, English, French, and Portuguese. He is currently working as teacher of French at the French Cultural Center, in Blantyre.

He was installed the headman of his village as Yaphet Mwakasungula IV on December 29, 1997. He is married to Ellen Kalobekamo and has four children.

=== Development and dissemination ===
The idea for a Malawian script came on November 10, 1977, in Paris, when Mwangwego discovered that there are various writing systems in the world, and thought that words meaning "to write" in Malawian languages were evidence that they once had a script of their own.

The Mwangwego script was created in 1979, with additional symbols created up to 1997 by Mwangwego. This was further revised until it was eventually finalised in 2003. The script was launched with significant publicity especially with an audience from Malawian Minister of Youth, Sports and Culture, Mr Kamangadazi Chambalo, was quoted as saying:

Mwangwego script is in itself history in the making. Irrespective of how it is going to be received by the public nationwide, the script is bound to go in the annals of our history as a remarkable invention.

The first person to learn the script was Mwandipa Chimaliro; ten other students that year learned the script as well who went on to teach others. In 2007 the Mwangwego Club was formed whose membership is open to those that have learned the script. As of 2012, there were about 395 people using it. Only one book has ever been published using the script which is A Malawi Tili Pati ("Malawians, where are we?") by Nolence Mwangwego himself in Chichewa in 2011. Mwangwego continues to hold public lectures and exhibitions in academic institutions and teach the script.

=== Encoding ===
Mwangwego was accepted for Unicode support in 2026. The Mwangwego block is set for the range U+16E00..16E3F.
