= Kaddare script =

Writing system for Somali created in 1952

Kaddare
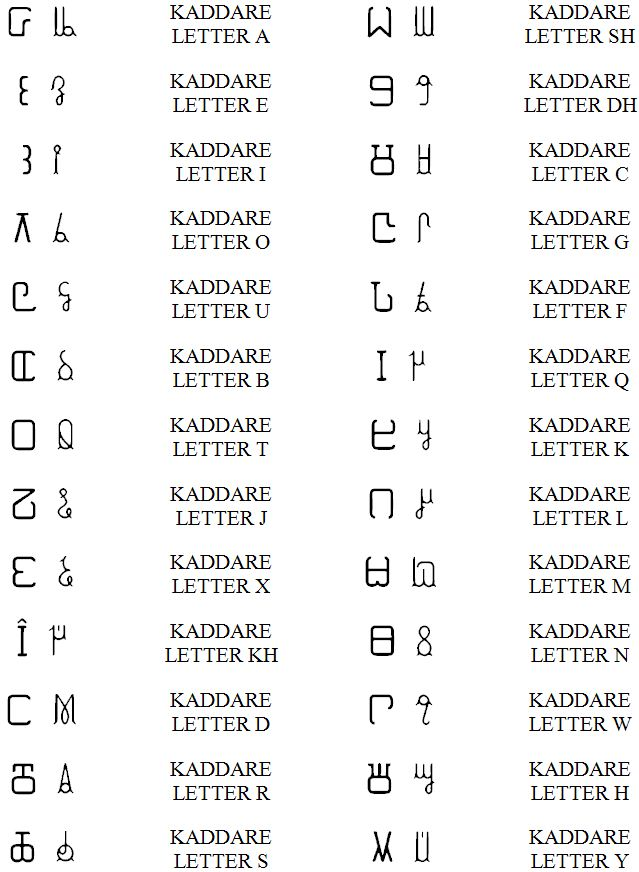
- Script type: Alphabet
- Published: 1952
- Languages: Somali language

The Kaddare script is a poorly known alphabetic script created to transcribe the Somali language. There are no known books written in the script.

== History ==
The script was invented in 1952 by a Sufi Sheikh, named Hussein Sheikh Ahmed Kaddare.

The Somali Language Committee, tasked in 1961 with deciding on a script for the nation after independence, recommended the Kaddare script, but had to settle for the Latin alphabet due to economic constraints. They appraised Kaddare as being the most accurate indigenous script for transcribing the Somali language.

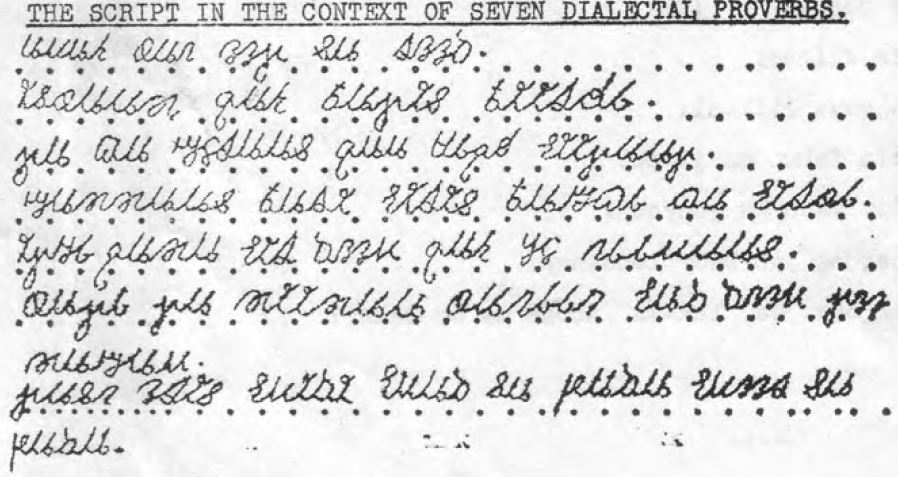
Cursive writing of Kaddare

== See also ==
- Somali orthography
- Borama
- Osmanya
