= Osmanya script =

Script created in the 1920s for Somali

Osmanya 𐒍𐒖𐒇𐒂𐒖 𐒋𐒘𐒈𐒑𐒛𐒒𐒕𐒖
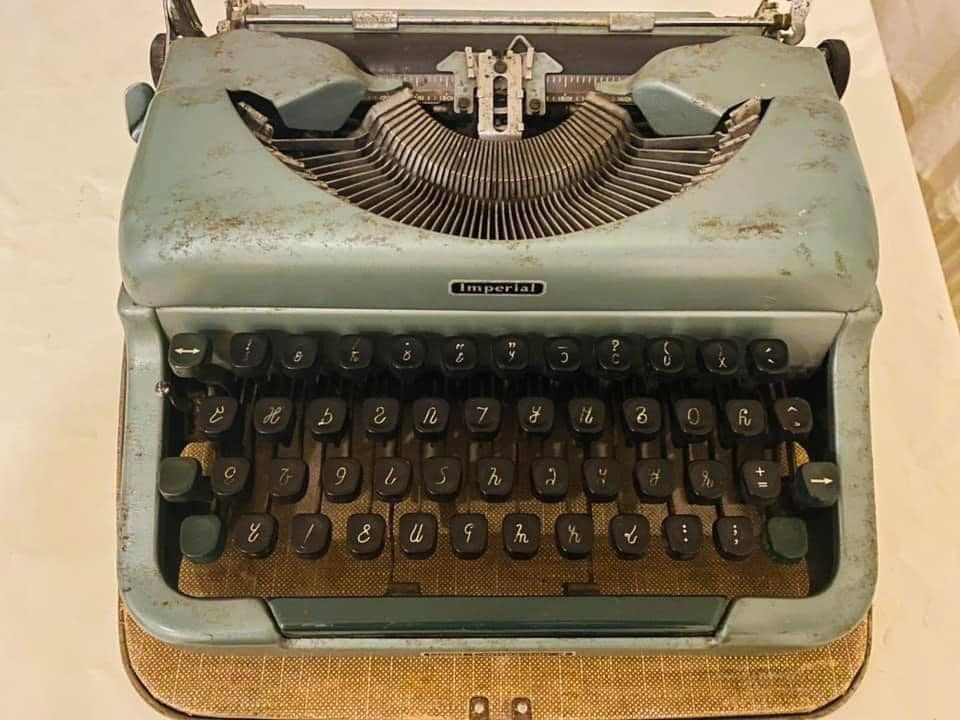
- Typewriter with Osmanya letters, from British Somaliland
- Script type: Alphabet
- Creator: Osman Yusuf Kenadid
- Published: 1920–1922
- Period: c. 1922 – c. 1972, some current interest
- Direction: Left-to-right
- Languages: Somali language

ISO 15924
- ISO 15924: Osma (260), Osmanya

Unicode
- Unicode alias: Osmanya
- Unicode range: U+10480–U+104AF

Osmanya (Farta Cismaanya, 𐒍𐒖𐒇𐒂𐒖 𐒋𐒘𐒈𐒑𐒛𐒒𐒕𐒖), known in Somali as Far Soomaali (𐒍𐒖𐒇 𐒈𐒝𐒑𐒛𐒐𐒘, "Somali writing") and in Arabic as al-kitābah al-ʿuthmāniyyat (الْكِتَابَة الْعُثْمَانِيَّة; "Osman writing"), is an alphabetic script created to transcribe the Somali language. It was invented by Osman Yusuf Kenadid, the son of Sultan Yusuf Ali Kenadid and brother of Sultan Ali Yusuf Kenadid of the Sultanate of Hobyo. Material written in the script is 'almost non-existent,' so it is difficult to describe its use with certainty.

== History ==
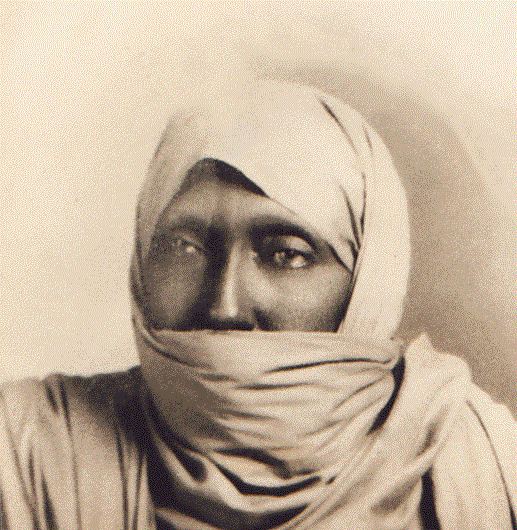
Osman Yusuf Kenadid.

While Osmanya gained reasonable acceptance for correspondence and bookkeeping at the local level, it met fierce resistance as a national script for several reasons: it was identified with the Majeerteen clan, who supported the Italian colonial government, rather than with the Somali nation as a whole (a view that has changed somewhat in the 21st century), there was opposition to making Somali rather than Arabic the official language of the country, and in addition there was opposition to using any indigenous script rather than either the Arabic script, long used for writing Arabic in Somalia, or the Latin script.

After independence a governmental commission was set up to decide on an official writing system for Somali. It favored Kaddare script, but judged it to be impractical for a developing nation. In October 1972 the Somali Latin alphabet was adopted as the official writing system for Somali because of its simplicity, ability to cope with all of the sounds in the language, and the widespread existence of machines and typewriters designed for the Latin script. The administration of President Mohamed Siad Barre subsequently launched a massive literacy campaign designed to ensure its adoption, which led to a sharp decline in use of Osmanya.

== Description ==
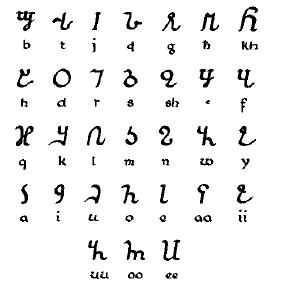
The Osmanya script as reproduced in Lewis (1958: 141), with phonetic values of the letters. Note the lack of an alef even at this date and the different alphabetic order compared to the presentation below.

The direction of reading and writing in Osmanya is from left to right, as in Latin script. Capitalization is sporadic.

Long vowels were originally written either double or with consonants, as in Arabic, but later ligatures were developed from the double vowels.

Transcription of long vowels
Latin	early Osmanya	late Osmanya
aa	𐒖𐒀 ⟨aʼ⟩	𐒛 ⟨ā⟩
ee	𐒗𐒕 ⟨ey⟩, 𐒗𐒗 ⟨ee⟩	𐒜 ⟨ē⟩
oo	𐒙𐒓 ⟨ow⟩, 𐒙𐒙 ⟨oo⟩	𐒝 ⟨ō⟩
ii	𐒘𐒕 ⟨iy⟩	𐒕 ⟨y⟩
uu	𐒚𐒓 ⟨uw⟩	𐒓 ⟨w⟩

Neither the tones nor the ATR/RTR distinction are marked in vowels, except occasionally in the 21st century with a diaeresis for ATR vowels, as is occasionally done also in Latin script.

The article and determiner suffixes are written separately from the noun, which retains its underlying form. Assimilation is however shown on the article/determiner itself [feminine -ta, masculine -ka]. Thus hooyada 'the mother' is written ⟨hooyo da⟩; hasha 'the she-camel' is written ⟨hal sha⟩. When the k of -ka elides, it is marked with an apostrophe, which was borrowed from Latin script. Thus dhinaca 'the side' is written ⟨dhinac'a⟩.

=== Letters ===
The order of the alphabet is not completely fixed, as only letters that correspond to Arabic script are consistently written in that order. The letter 𐒀 alef, which had been used to mark long vowels as well as glottal stop, was dropped around the time letters were added for aa, ee, oo, and w, y came to be used for uu, ii. The order below is -- apart from the anachronistic retention of the letter alef -- as written by the inventor's son Yaasiin, though various other orders are attested.

Osmanya	Name	Latin	IPA	Osmanya	Name	Latin	IPA	Osmanya	Name	Latin	IPA
𐒀 *	alef	ʼ	[ʔ, ː]	𐒁	ba	b	[b]	𐒂	ta	t	[t]
𐒃	ja	j	[d͡ʒ]	𐒄	xa	x	[ħ]	𐒅	kha	kh	[χ]
𐒆	deel	d	[d]	𐒇	ra	r	[r]	𐒈	sa	s	[s]
𐒉	shiin	sh	[ʃ]	𐒌	ga	g	[ɡ]	𐒊	dha	dh	[ɖ]
𐒋	cayn	c	[ʕ]	𐒍	fa	f	[f]	𐒎	qaaf	q	[q]
𐒏	kaaf	k	[k]	𐒐	laan	l	[l]	𐒑	miin	m	[m]
𐒒	nuun	n	[n]	𐒔	ha	h	[h]	𐒘	i	i	[i, ɪ]
𐒚	u	u	[ʉ, u]	𐒙	o	o	[ɞ, ɔ]	𐒖	a	a	[æ, ɑ]
𐒗	e	e	[e, ɛ]	𐒕	ya	y, ii	[j, iː, ɪː]	𐒓	waw	w, uu	[w, ʉː, uː]
𐒝	oo	oo	[ɞː, ɔː]	𐒛	aa	aa	[æː, ɑː]	𐒜	ee	ee	[eː, ɛː]

*alef, which was used for both glottal stop and long aa, has been dropped from the alphabet

=== Digits ===
The system is decimal:

Digit	0	1	2	3	4	5	6	7	8	9
Osmanya	𐒠	𐒡	𐒢	𐒣	𐒤	𐒥	𐒦	𐒧	𐒨	𐒩

Although some of these digits may look identical to various letters, this is not true for all fonts. These digits are written in the same direction as Arabic numerals.

== Unicode ==
Osmanya was added to the Unicode Standard in April 2003 with the release of version 4.0. Capitalization is not supported.

The Unicode block for Osmanya is U+10480–U+104AF:

Osmanya^{[1]}^{[2]} Official Unicode Consortium code chart (PDF)
	0	1	2	3	4	5	6	7	8	9	A	B	C	D	E	F
U+1048x	𐒀	𐒁	𐒂	𐒃	𐒄	𐒅	𐒆	𐒇	𐒈	𐒉	𐒊	𐒋	𐒌	𐒍	𐒎	𐒏
U+1049x	𐒐	𐒑	𐒒	𐒓	𐒔	𐒕	𐒖	𐒗	𐒘	𐒙	𐒚	𐒛	𐒜	𐒝		
U+104Ax	𐒠	𐒡	𐒢	𐒣	𐒤	𐒥	𐒦	𐒧	𐒨	𐒩						
Notes 1.As of Unicode version 18.0 2.Grey areas indicate non-assigned code points

== See also ==
- Kaddare script
- Somali alphabets
