= Languages of Tanzania =

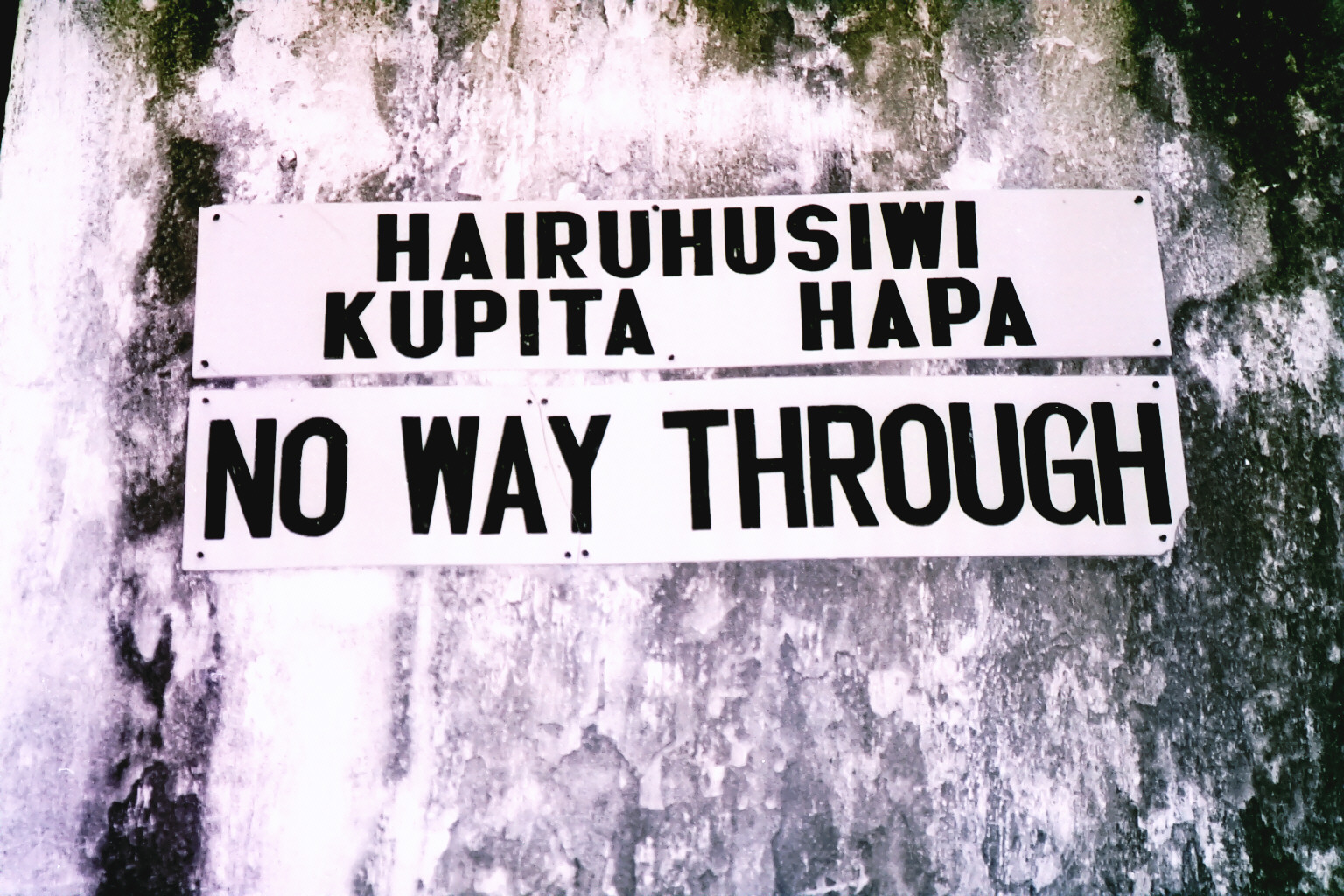
- Swahili/English signage in Zanzibar
- Official: Swahili and English (de facto)
- Regional: Arabic (in Zanzibar), Chaga, Makonde, Sukama, Nyiramba, Datooga
- Minority: Many Bantu, Cushitic and Nilotic languages; Hadza, Sandawe, Omaio
- Signed: Tanzanian sign languages
- Keyboard layout: QWERTY

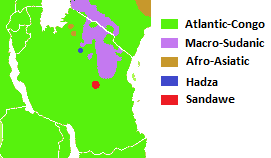
Language families of Tanzania

Tanzania is a multilingual country. There are many languages spoken in the country, none of which is spoken natively by a majority or a large plurality of the population. Swahili and English, the latter being inherited from colonial rule (see Tanganyika Territory), are widely spoken as lingua francas. They serve as working languages in the country, with Swahili being the official national language. There are more speakers of Swahili than English in Tanzania.

== Overview ==
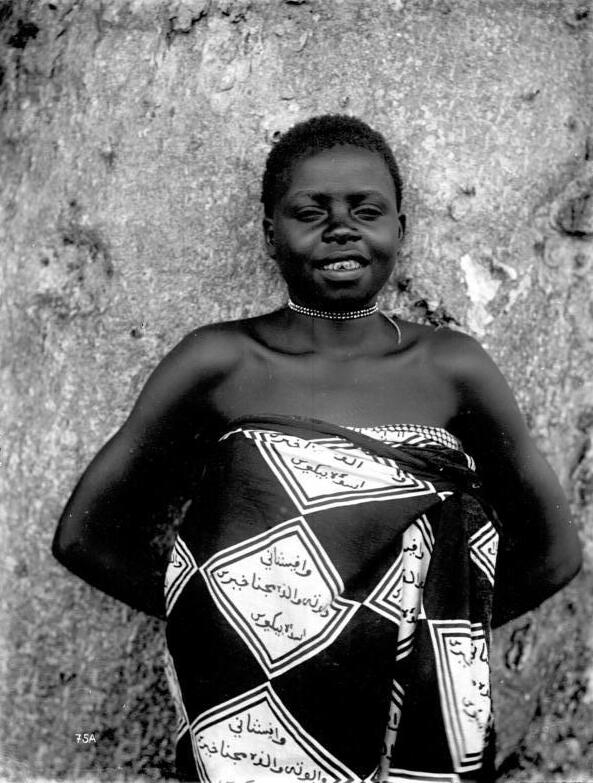
The Bantu Swahili language written in the Arabic script on the clothes of a Tanzanian woman (early 1900s).

According to Ethnologue, there are a total of 126 languages spoken in Tanzania. Two are institutional, 18 are developing, 58 are vigorous, 40 are endangered, and 8 are dying. There are also three languages that recently became extinct.

Most languages spoken locally belong to two broad language families: Niger-Congo (Bantu branch) and Nilo-Saharan (Nilotic branch), spoken by the country's Bantu and Nilotic populations, respectively. Additionally, the Hadza and Sandawe hunter-gatherers speak languages with click consonants, which have tentatively been classified within the Khoisan phylum (although Hadza may be a language isolate). The Cushitic and Semitic ethnic minorities speak languages belonging to the separate Afro-Asiatic family, with the Hindustani and British residents speaking languages from the Indo-European family.

Tanzania's various ethnic groups typically speak their mother tongues within their own communities. The two official languages, Swahili and English, are used in varying degrees of fluency for communication with other populations. According to the official national linguistic policy announced in 1984, Swahili is the language of the social and political sphere as well as primary and adult education, whereas English is the language of secondary education, universities, technology, and higher courts. The government announced in 2015 that it would discontinue the use of English as a language of education as part of an overhaul of the Tanzanian school system. Despite this plan, English remains the predominant language for secondary education.

Additionally, several Tanzanian sign languages are used.

== Language families ==
=== Major languages ===
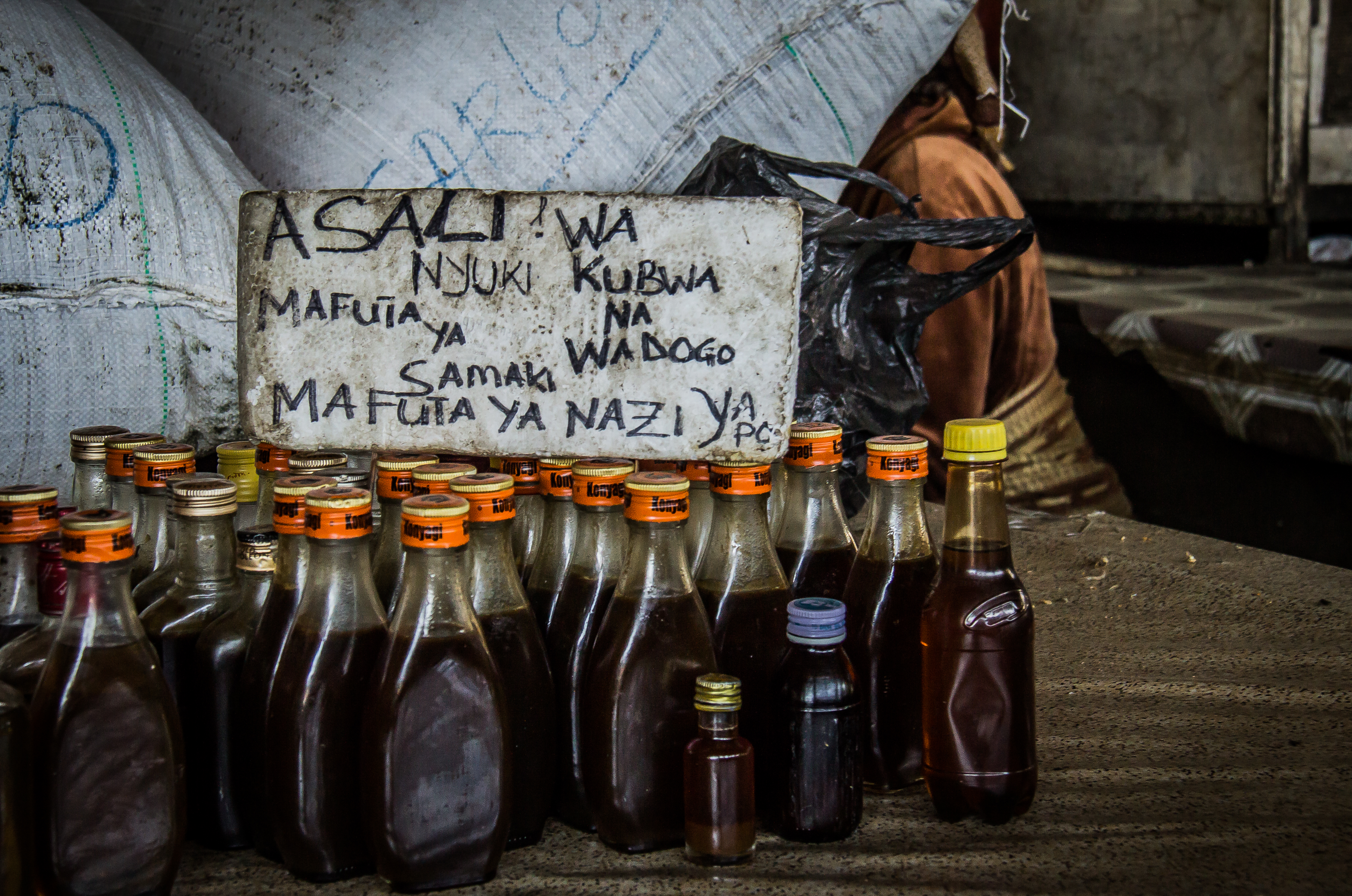
Sign in Swahili at a market in Tanzania: it offers honey, fish oil and coconut oil in large and small bottles.

Major languages spoken in Tanzania include:

- Niger-Congo
  - Bantu
    - Bemba
    - Bena (592,000, 2009)
    - Chaga
    - Digo (166,000, 2009)
    - Gogo (1.08 million, 2009)
    - Haya (1.94 million, 2016)
    - Hehe (1.21 million, 2016)
    - Iramba
    - Luguru (404,000, 2009)
    - Makonde (1.47 million, 2016)
    - Ndengereko
    - Ngoni
    - Nyakyusa
    - Nyamwezi (1.47 million, 2016)
    - Nyika
    - Nyiramba
    - Pare
    - Rangi (410,000, 2007)
    - Safwa (322,000, 2009)
    - Sonjo
    - Sukuma (8.13 million, 2016)
    - Swahili
    - Sambaa language (660,000, 2001)
    - Tongwe language
    - Tumbuka (400,000, 2007)
    - Turu
    - Vidunda language
    - Yao (630,000, 2016)
    - Zanaki
    - Kerewe
    - Nyambo
    - Gweno
    - West Kilimanjaro (Meru)
- Nilo-Saharan
  - Nilotic
    - Datooga
    - Kisankasa
    - Maasai (682,000, 2016)
    - Ngasa
    - Ogiek
    - Luo (185,000, 2009)
    - Zinza language

=== Minor languages ===
Languages spoken by the country's ethnic minorities include:

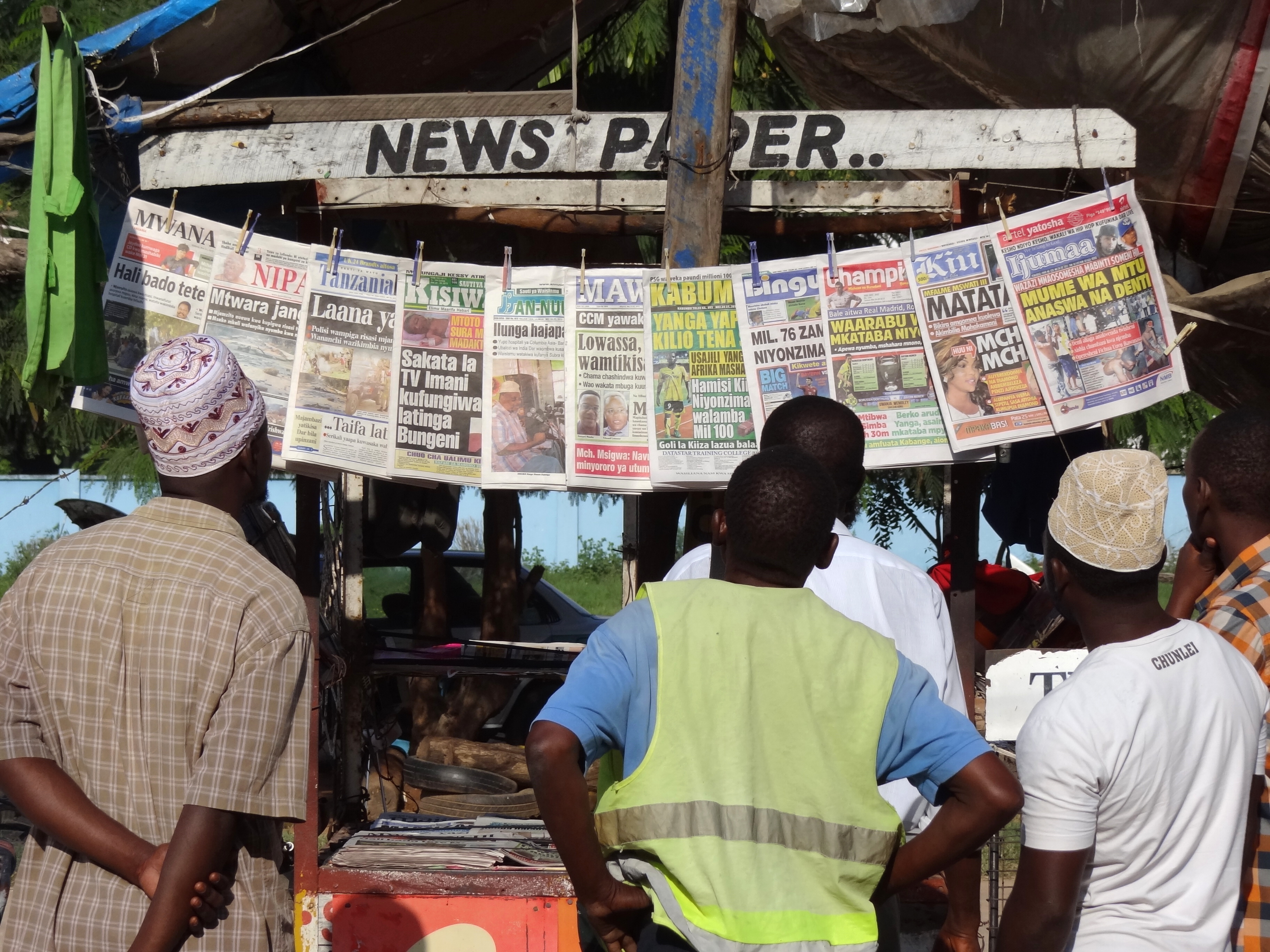
Newspapers in Tanzania

- Khoisan
  - Khoe
    - Hadza (possibly a language isolate)
    - Sandawe (possibly a language isolate)
- Afro-Asiatic
  - Cushitic
    - Alagwa
    - Burunge
    - Gorowa
    - Iraqw
  - Semitic
    - Arabic
- Indo-European
  - Indo-Iranian
    - Gujarati
    - Hindustani
    - Kutchi
  - Germanic
    - English
    - German

=== Extinct languages ===
- Asa language
- Kw'adza language

== See also ==
- Commonwealth English
- Languages of Africa
