= Kami language (Tanzania) =

Bantu language spoken in Tanzania

Kami
- Native to: Tanzania
- Native speakers: 5,500 (2009)
- Language family: Niger–Congo?: Atlantic–Congo; Benue–Congo; Bantoid; Bantu; Northeast Bantu; Northeast Coast Bantu; Ruvu (G30+G10); Kami

Language codes
- ISO 639-3: kcu
- Glottolog: kami1256
- Guthrie code: G.36
- ELP: Kami (Tanzania)

Kami is an endangered, under-described Eastern Bantu language. It is reported to be spoken by 5,518 people in the Morogoro region of Tanzania as recorded by Mradi wa Lugha in 2009. The number of fluent speakers left is significantly lower. In field trips to the area, no children or adolescents spoke the language, which means that the language is threatened with extinction. The youngest informant was in his thirties, and he could only understand Kami, not speak it.

Swahili, the national language of Tanzania, is gaining ground at the expense of Kami, and is the only language (apart from English) allowed in education, media, parliament and church. That said, Swahili is not the major threat to Kami – the regional language Luguru is. Luguru is the major language in the Morogoro region, with 403,602 speakers. In the smaller Morogoro district, where most Kami speakers live, the Luguru speakers amount to 73.5% while the Kami speakers amount to only 1.3%, and in the entire Morogoro region, the Kami speakers constitute only 0.3%. This means that most Kami speakers are in fact trilingual in Kami, Luguru and Swahili. Kami is linguistically similar to its neighbours Kutu, Kwere, and Zaramo.

There are no regional varieties of Kami. The area where most Kami speakers live is called Mikese and is situated to the east of Morogoro town. Speakers can be found in Mkunga Mhola, Dete, and (Lukonde) Koo. All the data collected was in collaboration with a total of 11 Kami mother tongue speakers.

Kami exhibits a great deal of variation, much of which can be traced to influence from neighbouring languages and Swahili. It is a fairly typical Bantu language, although there are some areas that stand out. For instance, the verbal morphology is heavily reduced, with only two tense markers (Past and Non-Past), one modal and few aspectual markers. The lack of tones is unusual for Bantu, although not particularly so in this area, as there is also no tone in Luguru (Mkude 1974) nor in Kagulu (Petzell 2008). Another interesting feature is the striking variety of allophones representing the same phoneme. Some of these sounds can be traced to Swahili influence and some to local languages such as Luguru. There is variation between speakers, but also within the idiolect of individual speakers. Finally, adjectives are few in number and other parts of speech such as nouns or verbs are used in adjectival constructions.

This in itself is not unusual. What is atypical, however, is the lack of the widespread adjectives ‘good’ and ‘bad.’ Their function is instead filled by ordinary verbs.
