= Kondoa Mjini =

Town in Kondoa, Dodoma, Tanzania

Kondoa Mji wa Kondoa
- Town and ward
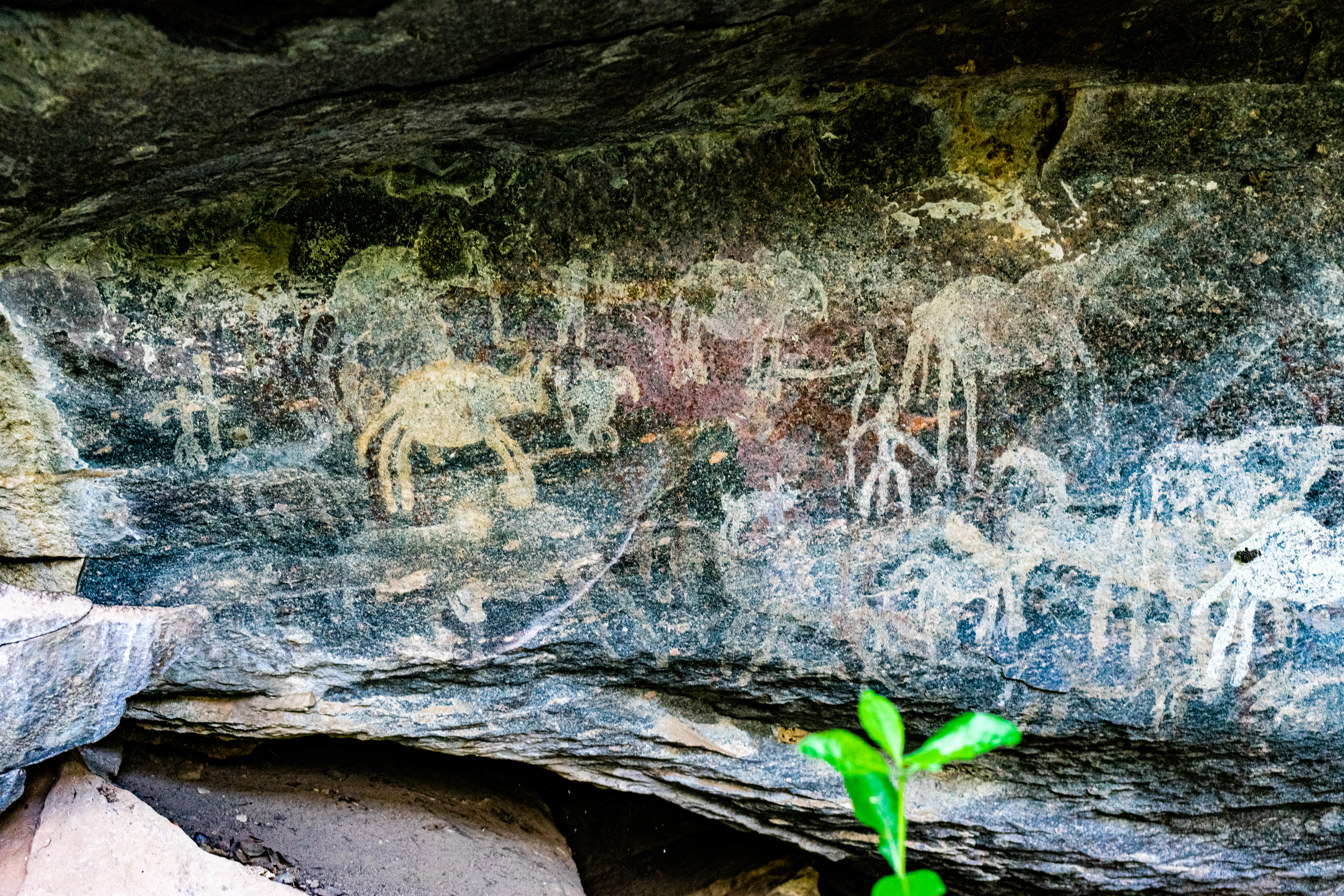
- UNESCO World Heritage, Kondoa Rock art in Kolo.

- Location of Kondoa Town

- Location within Tanzania
- Coordinates: 4.904578°S 35.782256°E
- Country: Tanzania
- Region: Dodoma Region
- District: Kondoa
- Established: 2015
- Headquarters: Kondoa Town

Government
  - Type: Town Council
  - Chairman: Mohamed Abdi Kiberenge
  - Director: Paul Mamba Sweya

Area
  - Town and ward: 1,419 km^{2} (548 sq mi)
- Highest elevation: 2,190 m (7,190 ft)
- Lowest elevation: 900 m (3,000 ft)

Population (2022 census)
  - Town and ward: 80,443
  - Density: 56.69/km^{2} (146.8/sq mi)
  - Urban: 80,443
- Time zone: EAT
- Postcode: 41701
- Area code: 026
- Website: District Website

Kondoa is a town and administrative ward (called Kondoa Mjini or Kondoa Urban) in the Kondoa District of the Dodoma Region of Tanzania.

Kondoa Town is the district capital of Kondoa District. The local government buildings were mostly built during the German colonization. The town also has a district hospital, three O-Level Secondary schools, one A-Level school for girls, and an agricultural college. There is also a teachers' training college called Bustani (garden in Kiswahili) College. There is a local NMB bank branch.

== Geography ==
Kodoa Town is 1,419 square kilometres (548 sq mi), with the town being 160 kilometres (99 mi) from Dodoma.

The town has a hot spring that provides drinking water for many inhabitants. There is also a river that runs through the town, though in the dry months there is almost no water above ground. There is a good bridge over the river.

=== Administrative Units ===
The town has two divisions. Kondoa Mjini with 6 wards consisting of 32 villages and neighborhoods, and Kolo with 2 wards consisting of 4 villages and neighborhoods.

=== Climate ===
The climate is semi-arid. The rainy season is from late December to mid March, and Kondoa receives little to no precipitation the rest of the year. The weather is mostly hot.

== Demographics ==
In 2016 the Tanzania National Bureau of Statistics report there were 64,147 people in the town.

The Warangi is the most populous ethnic group in Kondoa, and their native language is Kirangi. As it was a stop on an ancient caravan road, Kondoa has a sizeable non-Irangi minority. Other tribes include the Wasandewe, Waburunge, Wafyomi, Waalagwa, Wabarbaig, Wamasai, and Wagorowa.

The town is about 70% Muslim and 30% Christian, with aboriginal religions virtually extinct. Relations between religious groups are good.

== Transport ==
Trunk road T5 from Dodoma to Babati passes through the town.
