= Holy Ghost Church of East Africa =

African sect of Christianity

The Holy Ghost Church of East Africa
- Akurinu (Akorino)
- Abbreviation: HGCEA
- Type: New christian religious movement syncretism Autocephaly
- Classification: African initiated church Protestant
- Orientation: Pentecostal Charismatic
- Polity: Episcopal
- Region: Kenya and overseas
- Language: commonly Kikuyu, Embu, Meru
- Founder: Joseph Ng'ang'a
- Origin: 1926; Limuru, Kiambu County
- Members: est. 3 million

The Holy Ghost Church of East Africa (HGCEA), known among its adherents as Akurinu (sometimes “Akorino”), is an African sect of Christianity common in the central region of Kenya among the Agikuyu, Aembu and Ameru community. The sect incorporates some aspects of Christianity with those of traditional Kikuyu religious beliefs. The sect was officially registered in 1959. However, it traces its origins between the years 1926 and 1930 in Limuru, Kiambu County, Central Kenya.

== History ==
The origin of the word akurinu is not clear. It is said by some to come from the Kikuyu question ‘Mukuri-nú’ which translates to ‘who is the redeemer?’. Others say that it comes from the growling sounds made by early adherents to the sect when possessed by the spirit, an act described as gukurina. In his book Facing Mt. Kenya, Jomo Kenyatta states that the akurinu referred to themselves as Arooti(dreamers), people of God.

The akurinu identify Joseph Ng’ang’a as the founder of the sect. It was Ng’ang’a who ascended Mount Kenya (then known as Mount Kirinyaga) with the first four akurinu prophets - Joseph Kanini, Henry Maina, Philip Mukubwa, and Lilian Njeru. It was on this ascension that the akurinu say Njeru was instructed to remove all adornments she had worn, throw them into River Nyamindi, and cover her hair. They also claim to have been instructed by God to lift their hands in the air as they pray. These two practices form an integral part of akurinu religious beliefs today.

Henry Maina is credited with composing most of the 544 hymns in the akurinu hymn book. It is said that he was given the gift of music by God on condition that he would not marry. However, after marrying a woman from Nyahururu, he lost his musical prowess. His name was replaced by that of David Ikegu in the Akurinu New Testament.

In the 1950s at the height of tension between the British colonial government and natives, the movement came under heavy suppression from the colonial government which was opposed to any indigenous religious movement. Joseph Ng’ang’a was shot dead on 2 February 1934 by British soldiers while praying in a cave.

== Differences with mainstream Christianity ==
Adherents to the sect are known to be reserved about their religious beliefs and do not interact freely with non-Akurinu. They are conspicuous in their white robes and turbans as their scripture dictates that they should discard all forms of European dressing. The white turban is also meant to show that they are peace-makers. These are some of the main differences between the akurinu sect and mainstream Christianity.

- Elders seclude themselves for 7-14 days before any important event.
- Akurinu men are not allowed to marry before attaining the age of 25. For women, the minimum age limit for marriage is 22. This is however more of a guideline than a rule.
- They do not believe in having statues in the church or homes. As such, it is forbidden to have any statues of the Virgin Mary or Jesus Christ. This, they say, is drawn from the 10 commandments which states "You shall not make for yourself an image in the form of anything in heaven above or on the earth beneath or in the waters below."
- Akurinu baptism is not necessarily by water. It can also be done using oil or by the laying of hands. This, they say, is drawn from the Bible in Matthew 3:11 where John the Baptist says, "I baptize you with water but after me comes one who is more powerful than I. . . who will baptize you with the Holy Spirit and fire."
- Dead bodies are not allowed near church premises. Praying for the dead is done at the burial site. The dead are not supposed to be taken to a mortuary. Instead, they are preserved using ice and other traditional methods.
- Consumption of alcohol is forbidden.
- Consumption of pork and pork products is forbidden.
- The Akurinu prefer traditional medicine to modern/Western medicine. They believe that the use of modern medicine shows lack of faith in the healing power of God.

Today, the church has split into several different sub-sects, each with its own style of dress.
