= Alagwa people =

Ethnic group from Dodoma Region of Tanzania

Alagwa
Waalagwa
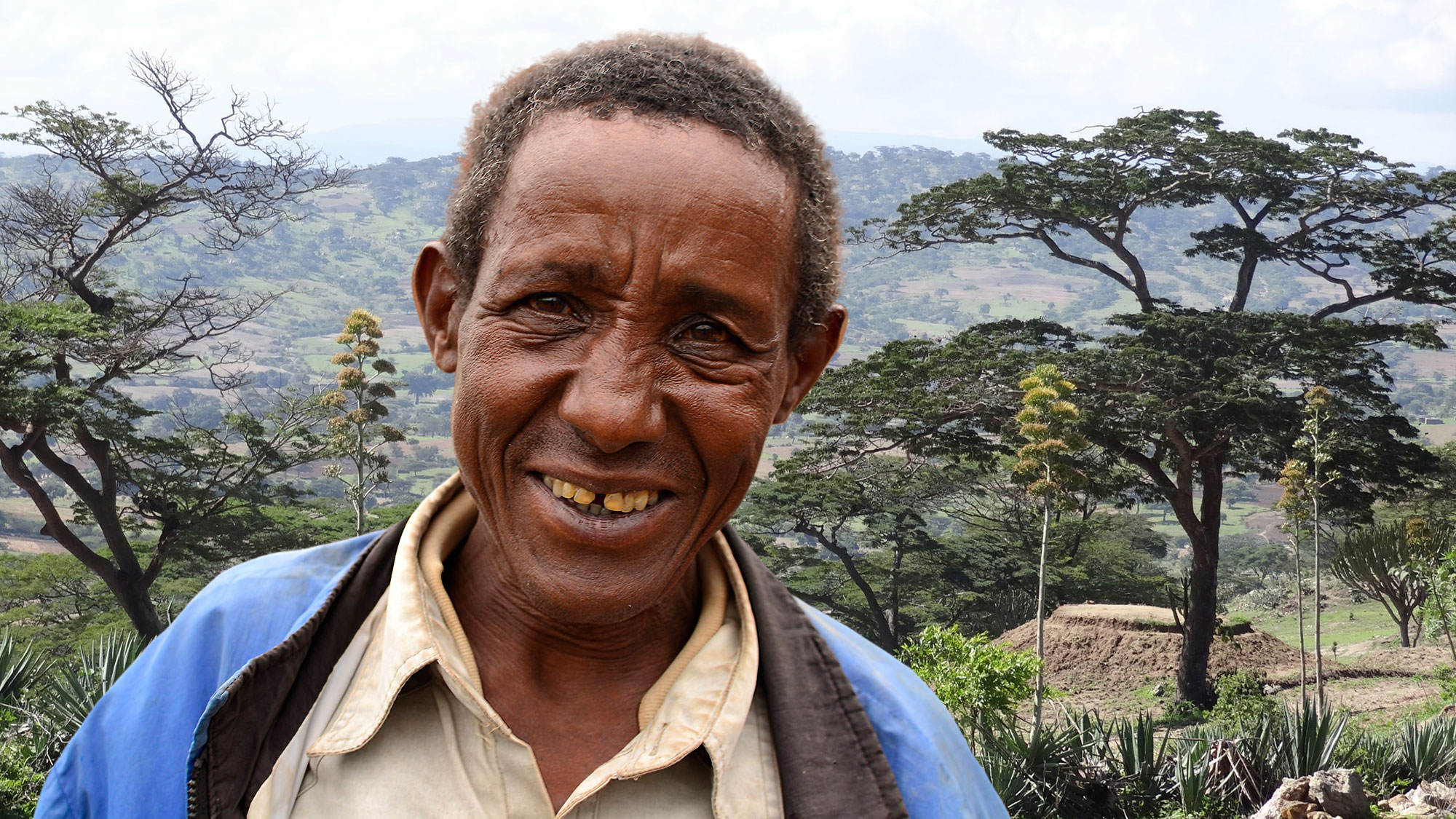
- An Alagwa man from Kondoa District

Total population
- c. 52,816 (2022)

Regions with significant populations
- Tanzania Dodoma Region & Manyara Region (Kondoa District, Hanang District)

Languages
- Alagwa (native), Rangi, Swahili

Religion
- Predominantly Islam (>89%)

Related ethnic groups
- Iraqw & other South Cushitic peoples

The Alagwa (Swahili: Waasi; Rangi: Vaasi; Iraqw: Alawa) are a Cushitic ethnic group mostly based in the Kondoa District (Alagwa: Ulàa) of the Dodoma Region in central Tanzania, an area well known for rock art. Smaller numbers of Alagwa reside in the Hanang district of the Manyara Region in Tanzania, as well. They speak the Alagwa language as a mother tongue, which belongs to the South Cushitic branch of the Afro-Asiatic family. In 2022, the Alagwa population was estimated to number 52,816 individuals, and Mous (2016) estimates the number of speakers to be slightly over 10,000.

Some of the Alagwa have mixed with communities of Gorowa, Sandawe, Datooga, and Rangi. Many Alagwa speak the Rangi language and the two groups have both influenced each other. Many of the Alagwa are Muslims, following from an extended period of interactions with Swahili traders in Kondoa in the 19th century.

== Ethnonym ==
The Alagwa use the endonym Alagwa to describe themselves. The nearby Iraqw people use a variant of Alagwa (Alawa) to refer to the group. This exonym is often used in literature relating to the Alagwa. However, the Alagwa are more commonly known by the Swahili exonym of Wasi or Waasi in Tanzania. This Swahili exonym originates from the Rangi exonym for the Alagwa, Vaasi. In turn, the Rangi name Vaasi is actually derived from a Bantu term approximately meaning "original inhabitants", which is reflective of the existence of the Alagwa in what is now Kondoa District prior to the arrival and migration of the Rangi to the area.

The Alagwa refer to their language with the endonym Alaagwa’isa. In Tanzania, the language is better known by the Swahili exonym of Chasi.

In English, the Alagwa and their language are sometimes referred to as Asi. This English exonym is the result of dropping the Swahili plural prefix of Wa- and the Swahili artifact prefix of Ch- from the Swahili exonyms of Waasi and Chasi, respectively.

== History ==
=== Origin ===
According to the oral traditions of the Alagwa, they ultimately originated from Mecca (Alagwa: Maaka) and other areas of perceived prestige, such as South Sudan. They believe their predecessors in the Tanzanian Rift Valley were the legendary 'Ayràa people. In Alagwa folklore, the 'Ayràa were hunters and honey collectors with long hair.

However, the Alagwa, along with other South Cushitic peoples, are presumed to have originated from present-day Southwestern Ethiopia. South Cushitic speakers would then migrate south to Lake Turkana and further south, entering Tanzania in 2000 BC. The presence of South Cushitic peoples in the Tanzanian Rift Valley preceded the arrival of Bantu-speaking peoples like the Rangi and Nyaturu.

Historically, the earliest known people inhabiting the Tanzanian Rift Valley were the Khoisan ancestors of the Sandawe and Hadza. The Sandawe are known for hunting and collecting honey like the legendary 'Ayràa of the Alagwa.

=== Early history ===
Research from the 1980s and 1990s suggests the Alagwa, Gorowa, and Iraqw are descended from the Iraqw cluster of South Cushitic peoples. These people likely migrated along the Bubu river (Alagwa: Duuduu) towards Mount Hanang and continued to the Iraqw cradle land. Both Iraqw and Gorowa oral traditions confirm such a migration after a battle, presumably with the Datooga, at Ma'angwatay. The location of Ma'angwatay is said to be the area roughly south of Mount Hanang. Despite this, the Iraqw migration and the battle at Ma'angwatay are completely absent in Alagwa oral tradition. Even the toponym of Ma'angwatay is entirely unknown to the Alagwa.

Alagwa refugees, fleeing attacks from the Datooga, played an important role in Sandawe history. The Sandawe people were traditionally hunter-gatherers, and were first introduced to cattle by Alagwa refugees. Along with cattle, these refugees would introduce rainmaking and the transmission of lineage to the Sandawe. Many Alagwa intermarried with the Sandawe, resulting in them being absorbed into Sandawe society. In Sandawe culture, the descendants of assimilated Alagwa still hold one of the rainmaker clan names.

Alagwa oral traditions make mention of their historical ties with the neighbouring Burunge people, another South Cushitic group. The Alagwa language shares many surface level similarities with the Burunge language, despite being on different branches of the South Cushitic languages. These linguistic similarities are in large part due to the historical interactions between the Alagwa and Burunge. The Alagwa adopted a plethora of Burunge loanwords including the Alagwa place-name for Kondoa, Ulàa. The Alagwa Ulàa comes from Burunge Ula, which was the name of a Burunge individual who lived in the area.

The oral traditions of the Alagwa describe their extensive contacts with the nearby Rangi. These traditions mention the establishment of Haubi, the first Rangi settlement in the region. The Alagwa and Rangi mutually influenced each other's languages and cultures. Many Alagwa assimilated into Rangi culture through intermarriage and adoption of the Rangi language. As a result, most Rangi believe that their ancestors originated from East Africa (like most Cushitic peoples) despite the fact that most Bantu peoples are presumed to have came from Western Africa. In Rangi society, the Alagwa Relatives clan (Rangi: Vaasinduu), in particular, has the most Alagwa ancestry.

== See also ==
- List of ethnic groups in Tanzania
