= Gorowa =

Gorowa may refer to:

- Gorowa people
- Gorowa language
