= Kamba language =

Bantu language spoken in Kenya

Kamba
- Kikamba
- Native to: Kenya, Tanzania
- Region: Machakos, Kitui, Makueni, and Shimba Hills
- Ethnicity: Akamba
- Native speakers: 4.6 million (2019 census); 600,000 L2 speakers
- Language family: Niger–Congo?: Atlantic–Congo; Volta-Congo; Benue–Congo; Bantoid; Southern Bantoid; Bantu; Northeast Bantu; Upland Bantu; Thagiicu; East Thagiicu; Kamba-Dhaiso; Kamba
- Dialects: Masaku; Mumoni; North Kitui; South Kitui

Language codes
- ISO 639-2: kam
- ISO 639-3: Either: kam – Kamba dhs – Dhaiso
- Glottolog: kamb1297
- Guthrie code: E.55–56
- ELP: Dhaiso

Kamba (/ˈkæmbə/), or Kikamba, is a Bantu language spoken by the Kamba people, primarily in Kenya, with speakers also in Uganda, Tanzania, and elsewhere. In Kenya, Kamba is generally spoken in four counties: Machakos, Kitui, Makueni, and Kwale. The Machakos dialect is considered the standard variety and has been used in translation. The other major dialect is Kitui.

Kamba has lexical similarities to other Bantu languages such as Kikuyu, Meru, and Embu, of whom together they form the GEMA community.

Dance song. Male solo. Akamba. Machakos. 1911–12.

Dance song. Machakos. Akamba. 1911-12

The Swedish Museum of World Culture holds field recordings of the Kamba language made by Swedish ethnographer Gerhard Lindblom in 1911–12. Lindblom used phonograph cylinders to record songs along with other means of documentation in writing and photography. He also gathered objects, and later presented his work in The Akamba in British East Africa (1916).

== Phonology ==
=== Vowels ===
	Front	Central	Back
Close	i iː		u uː
Close-mid	e eː		o oː
Open-mid	ɛ ɛː		ɔ ɔː
Open		a aː	

=== Consonants ===
		Labial	Dental	Alveolar	Palatal	Velar
Stop		(b)		t (d)		k (ɡ)
Affricate					tʃ (dʒ)	
Fricative		β	ð	s (z)		
Nasal		m	n̪	n		ŋ
Lateral				l		
Approximant	labial				ɥ	w
Approximant	central		(ð̞)	j		

- /tʃ/ occurs as a result of palatalization among /k/ before /j/.
- In post-nasal positions, sounds /t, k, s, tʃ/ then become voiced as [d, ɡ, z, dʒ]. The voiced fricative /β/ then becomes a voiced stop [b] in post-nasal position.
- The palatal glide sound /j/ is typically articulated to the front of the mouth, so that is interdental as [ð̞] or alveolo-palatal as [j̟]. When preceding a consonant however, it is always heard as a regular palatal glide [j].

== Sources ==
- Mwau, John Harun (2006). Kikamba Dictionary: Kikamba-English, Kikamba-Kikamba, English-Kikamba. ISBN 9966-773-09-6.
