= Alagwa =

Alagwa may refer to:

- Alagwa people, ethnic group in Tanzania
- Alagwa language, Cushitic language of Tanzania
- Alagwa (film), a 2012 Filipino film

== See also ==
- Alawa (disambiguation)
