= Burunge =

Burunge may refer to:

- the Burunge people
- the Burunge language
