= Kagulu language =

Bantu language of Tanzania

Kaguru
- Native to: Tanzania
- Ethnicity: Kagulu
- Native speakers: 240,000 (2006 Census)
- Language family: Niger–Congo?: Atlantic–Congo; Benue–Congo; Bantoid; Bantu; Northeast Bantu; Northeast Coast Bantu; Ruvu (G30+G10); Kaguru

Language codes
- ISO 639-3: kki
- Glottolog: kagu1239
- Guthrie code: G.12

Kaguru (Kagulu) is a Bantu language of the Morogoro and Dodoma regions of Tanzania. It is closely related to Gogo and Zaramo, but is not intelligible with other languages.
