= Mbugwe =

Mbugwe may refer to:

- the Mbugwe people
- the Mbugwe language
