= Sagara language =

Bantu language of Tanzania

Sagara
- Sagala
- Native to: Tanzania
- Native speakers: (79,000 cited 1987)
- Language family: Niger–Congo?: Atlantic–Congo; Benue–Congo; Bantoid; Bantu; Northeast Bantu; Northeast Coast Bantu; Ruvu (G30+G10); Sagara

Language codes
- ISO 639-3: sbm
- Glottolog: saga1256
- Guthrie code: G.39

Sagara (Sagala) is a Bantu language of the Morogoro and Dodoma regions of Tanzania. It is sometimes called Southern Sagala to distinguish it from the Sagalla language of Kenya (Northern Sagala); the similarity of the names is a coincidence.
