= Luguru =

Luguru may refer to:

- the Luguru people
- the Luguru language
