= Ngoni language (Tanzania) =

Bantu language spoken in southwestern Tanzania

Ngoni
- Songea
- Chingoni
- Native to: Tanzania
- Region: Songea
- Language family: Niger–Congo?: Atlantic–Congo; Volta-Congo; Benue–Congo; Bantoid; Southern Bantoid; Bantu; Northeast Bantu; Southern Tanzanian Highlands Bantu; Manda-Ngoni; Ngoni

Language codes
- ISO 639-3: xnj
- Glottolog: tanz1241
- Guthrie code: N.12

Ngoni is a Bantu language spoken in the Songea region of Tanzania. It is not an Nguni language, but only retains the name: It started as the Pangwa dialect of Nguni captives; over generations the original Nguni language was lost.
