= Iraqw =

Iraqw may refer to:

- Iraqw people
- Iraqw language
