= G36 =

G36 may refer to:

- Heckler & Koch G36, a German assault rifle
- Beechcraft G36 Bonanza, an American aircraft
- G36 Nanjing–Luoyang Expressway, in China
- Glock 36, an Austrian pistol
- Grumman G-36, a F4F Wildcat aircraft variant
- Kami language (Tanzania)
- Matsuchi Station, in Ehime Prefecture, Japan
