= Gweno language =

Bantu language spoken in Tanzania

Gweno
- Kigweno
- Native to: Tanzania
- Region: North Pare Mountains, Kilimanjaro Region
- Ethnicity: (older adults)
- Native speakers: 2,500 (no date)
- Language family: Niger–Congo?: Atlantic–Congo; Benue–Congo; Bantoid; Bantu; Northeast Bantu; Kilimanjaro Bantu; Gweno
- Writing system: Unwritten

Language codes
- ISO 639-3: gwe
- Glottolog: gwen1239
- Guthrie code: E.65
- ELP: Gweno

Gweno (kighonu) is a Bantu language spoken in the North Pare Mountains in the Kilimanjaro Region of Tanzania. The people known as the Gweno (or more properly Asu) are a Chaga ethnic and linguistic group. Since the Chaga people are Bantu speakers, the adopted language contains dialects similar to that of the Kenyan language Kamba. Gweno shares about 54% to 56% of its vocabulary with other Chaga dialects and 46% with Taita dialects. However, a large percentage of its vocabulary is not seen in the other dialects. Also at the start of the 11th century, the Chaga people descended and migrated from the Bantu group in which they migrated to the foothills of mount Kilimanjaro. The Gweno language is today spoken mostly by older adults, with younger generations having shifted to Asu and Swahili. Ethnologue considers Gweno to be moribund; the language is not being passed down because children have not been exposed to Gweno since the 1970s. The generational shift from Gweno to either Asu or Swahili has certainly created shifts in dialect, however Gweno speakers do not see this as a threat.
