= Kilimanjaro Bantu languages =

Kilimanjaro Bantu
- Geographic distribution: Kilimanjaro Region
- Linguistic classification: Niger–Congo?: Atlantic–Congo; Volta-Congo; Benue–Congo; Bantoid; Southern Bantoid; Bantu; Northeast Bantu; Kilimanjaro-Taita; Kilimanjaro Bantu
- Proto-language: Proto-Kilimanjaro Bantu
- Subdivisions: Chaga; Gweno language

Language codes
- Glottolog: chag1248

The Kilimanjaro Bantu languages are a group of closely related Bantu languages spoken in the Kilimanjaro Region of Tanzania.
