= MGZ =

MGZ may mean:

- Mbugwe language
- Metal Gear Solid: Ground Zeroes
- Militärgeschichtliche Zeitschrift
