= Wasi language =

Wasi may be:

- Pele-Ata language (New Guinea)
- Alagwa language (Tanzania)
- Wasi-wari (Afghanistan)
