= Mbugwe people =

Ethnic group from Manyara Region of Tanzania

The Mbugwe are a Bantu ethnic group based in the Babati District of Manyara Region and in southwestern Arusha Region of Tanzania. The Mbugwe are said to have originated from the Rangi and they speak a language that is related to Rangi. In 1999, the Mbugwe population was estimated to number 24,000. They speak the Mbugwe language, the following are places where Mbugwe tribe at the Manyara region are distributed in Mwada, Magugu, Babati etc.

== See also ==
- Mbugwe language
- Arusha Region
- Manyara Region
- Babati
