= Embu language =

Bantu language spoken in Kenya

Embu
- Kîembu
- Native to: Kenya
- Region: Eastern Province, Embu County
- Ethnicity: Aembu
- Native speakers: 320,000 (2009 census)
- Language family: Niger–Congo?: Atlantic–Congo; Volta-Congo; Benue–Congo; Bantoid; Southern Bantoid; Bantu; Northeast Bantu; Upland Bantu; Thagiicu; East Thagiicu; Embu-Temi; Embu
- Dialects: Mbeere; Embu proper
- Writing system: Latin (after European contact)

Language codes
- ISO 639-3: ebu
- Glottolog: embu1241
- Guthrie code: E.52

- Person: Muembu
- People: Aembu
- Language: Kiembu
- Country: Vururi Wa Embu

Embu, also known as Kîembu, is a Bantu language of Kenya. It is spoken by the Embu people, also known as the (Aembu) (sg. Muembu). Speakers of the Embu language can also be found in neighboring districts/counties and in the diaspora.

The language is closely related to the Kikuyu, Kimeru and Kamba languages.

== Dialects ==
Embu has two known dialects; Mbeere (Mbere, Kimbeere) and Embu proper. Native Embu speakers can also tell apart a speaker from areas close to Mount Kenya, because they speak with a slight dialect locally called Kiruguru (Kirũgũrũ).

== Vocabuary ==
Sample translations of words from English to Kiembu. Note: Accented characters or diacritical mark are not shown in the following two tables.

English	Kiembu
mouth	kanyua
eye; eyes	ritho; metho
head; heads	kiongo; ciongo
hair	njuiri (no plural)
tooth; teeth	igego; magego
tongue; tongues	rurimi; irimi
nose; noses	inyiuru; manyiuru
ear; ears	gutu; matu
neck; necks	ngingo (no plural)
hand; hands	njara (no plural)
throat; throats	mumero; mimero
breast; breasts	nyondo
arm; arms	kivi;ivi
claw; claws	ngunyu
nail; nails	ngunyu
leg; legs	kuguru; maguru
foot; feet	kuguru; maguru or gitende; itende
buttock; buttocks	itina; matina
belly, stomach	nda, ivu
navel	ikonye
intestines	mara
blood	nthakame
urine	mathugumo
bone; bones	ivindi; mavindi
skin	ngothi
wing; wings	ithagu; mathagu
feather; feathers	ivuta; mavuta
school	cukuru
church	kanitha
horn; horns	ruvia; ivia, mvia
tail; tails	mukia; mikia
human being(s)/person(s)	mundu; andu
man; men	mundu murume; andu arume
woman; women	mutumia; atumia or mundu muka; andu aka
husband; husbands	muthuri; athuri
child; children	mwana; ciana
name; names	riitwa; mariitwa
sky	matu/iguru
night	utuku
moon	mweri
sun	riua
wind	ruvuvo
cloud; clouds	itu; matu
dew	ime
rain	mbura
ground	nthi
sand	muthanga
path/road	gacira/njira
water	manji or mai
stream/river	karunji/runji
sweat	nthithina
hill/mountain	karima/kirima
house; houses	nyomba
fire	mwaki
firewood	ruku (singular); nguu (plural)
smoke	ndogo
ash	muu
knife; knives	kaviu; tuviu
rope; ropes	mukanda; mikanda
spear; spears	itumu; matumu
war	mbaara
animal; animals	nyamu
meat	nyama
dog; dogs	ngui
elephant; elephants	njogu
goat; goats	mburi
bird; birds	giconi; iconi
tortoise	nguru
snake	njoka
fish	nthamaki
louse; lice	muthui; mithui
egg; eggs	itumbi; matumbi
tree; trees	muti; miti
bark	ikoni

English	Kiembu
lake/sea/ocean	iria
lakes/seas/oceans	maria
leaf; leaves	ithangu; mathangu
root; roots	muri; miri
salt	cumbi
oil/fat	maguta
hunger(general)	ng’aragu
hunger for meat	ngumba
iron (metal)	cuma
one	Imwe
two	Igiri
three	Ithatu
four	Inya
five	Ithano
six	Ithathatu or Ithanthatu
seven	Mugwanja
eight	Inyanya
nine	Kenda
ten	Ikumi
come	uka
send	tuma
walk	thii
fall	gua
leave	uma
fly	guruka
pour	iturura
strike	ringa
bite	ruma
to strike	kugoma
wash (tr.)	thambia
split	atura
give	va
steal	iia
squeeze	vivinya
cultivate	rima
bury (tr.)	thika
burn (tr.)	vivia
eat	ria
drink	nyua
vomit I	tavika
vomit II	mataviko
suck I	onga
suck II	onga
spit (saliva)	tua
blow (on)	vuva
swell	imba
give birth	ciara
die	kua
kill	uraga
push	tindika
pull	gucia
sing	ina
play (game)	thaaka
be afraid	itigire
want	enda
say	uga
smell (something)	nungira
see	ona
show	onia
hear	igua
know	menya
count	tara
advice	utaro
advise	taara

== Sample phrases ==
English	Kiembu	Gĩkũyũ	Kiswahili
How are you?	Ũvoro waku? or Kũvana atĩa?	Ũhoro waku? or Kũhana atĩa?	Habari yako? or U hali gani?
(Please) give me some water	Mve/mva maĩ. or Ngundia maĩ.	He maĩ.	Tafadhali nipe maji. or Naomba unipe maji.
How are you doing?	Wi mwaro?	Ũrĩ mwega? or Wi mwega?	Uko mzima? or U hali gani?
I am hungry.	Nĩ mũvũtu.	Ndĩ mũhũtu.	(Mimi) niko na njaa.
Help me.	Ndethia.	Ndeithia.	Nisaidie.
I am good.	Nĩ mwaro.	Ndĩ mwega.	Sijambo or Mimi mzima.
Are you a friend?	Wĩ mũrata?	Wĩ mũrata?	Wewe ni rafiki?
Bye, be blessed.	Tigwa na wega. or Tigwaa na thayũ.	Tigwo na wega. or Tigwo na thaayũ.	Kwaheri, na ubarikiwe.
I love you.	Nĩngwendete.	Nĩngwendete.	(Mimi) nakupenda.
Come here.	Ũka ava. or Ũkava.	Ũka haha.	Njoo hapa.
I will phone you.	Nĩngũkũvũrĩra thimũ.	Nĩngũkũhũrĩra thimũ.	Nitakupigia simu.
I am blessed.	Nĩmũrathime.	Ndĩmũrathime.	(Mimi) nimebarikiwa.
God is good.	Ngai ni mwaro.	Ngai ni mwega.	Mungu ni mwema.
Give me some money.	Mve mbeca. or Mva mbia.	He mbeca.	Nipe pesa.
Stop the nonsense.	Tiga wana. or Tigana na ũrimũ.	Tiga wana.	Wacha upuuzi.
You are educated.	Wi műthomű.	Wi műthomű.	Umeelimika (umesoma sana).
