= Taita Cushitic languages =

Hypothetical extinct Cushitic languages

Taita Cushitic
- Geographic distribution: Taita Hills, Kenya
- Extinct: 19th century?
- Linguistic classification: Afro-Asiatic: Cushitic; South; Rift ?; Taita Cushitic
- Subdivisions: Taita Cushitic A; Taita Cushitic B

Language codes
- ISO 639-3: None (mis)
- Glottolog: tait1247

Taita Cushitic is a pair of hypothesized South Cushitic languages, assumed to have been spoken by Cushitic peoples inhabiting the Taita Hills of Kenya before they were assimilated into the Bantu population after the Bantu Migration into East Africa. Evidence for the languages is primarily South Cushitic loanwords in the Bantu languages Dawida and Saghala (which are sometimes grouped together as the Taita language), as well as oral traditions of the Dawida and Saghala.

== Overview ==
Derek Nurse and Christopher Ehret propose that Taita Cushitic must have comprised two distinct Southern Cushitic substrate languages, which they term "Taita Cushitic A" and "Taita Cushitic B".

Ehret and Nurse (1981) suggest that Cushitic-speaking peoples reached the Taita Hills as early as the second millennium BC. South Cushitic loanwords that are found today in the Dawida and Saghala varieties of the Bantu Taita language indicate that at least three such South Cushitic communities previously inhabited the Taita area. Analysis of the type of South Cushitic loanwords that were adopted by Bantu speakers in the Taita Hills indicates that these South Cushitic communities probably formed a majority of the region's population prior to the arrival of Bantu peoples. Nurse adds that it is likely that the Taita Cushites were completely assimilated only recently since the lateral consonants in South Cushitic loanwords that were borrowed by speakers of the Bantu Taita language were still pronounced as such within living memory. However, those laterals have now been replaced.

Ehret notes that the Taita Cushitic loanwords that were preserved in the Saghala and Dawida varieties of the Bantu Taita language include terms such as "to buy/sell" and "wild dog". Some of the borrowed Cushitic terms also subsequently underwent sound changes and/or alterations in morphology after adoption by Bantu Taita speakers. Additionally, Nurse suggests that certain South Cushitic loanwords that are today found in the Bantu Mijikenda language are also of Taita Cushitic origin. He adds that these word-borrowings may have been adopted indirectly via Taita Bantu intermediaries, who had themselves borrowed the terms from South Cushites at an earlier date.

According to E. H. Merritt (1975), oral traditions of the Taita Bantus likewise assert that two populations, which are usually identified as South Cushitic-speaking peoples, in the past inhabited the Taita Hills before the arrival of their own ancestors. These Cushitic former residents are remembered by a variety of often interchanging names, including the "Bisha", "Sikimi", "Nyamba" and "Wasi".
