= Thagiicu languages =

Group of Northeast Bantu languages

Thagiicu
- Central Kenya Bantu
- Native to: Kenya and Tanzania
- Region: Central Province (Kenya), Embu County, Meru County, Tharaka-Nithi County, Machakos County, Kitui County, Makueni County, Ngorongoro District, Arusha
- Language family: Niger–Congo?: Atlantic–Congo; Volta-Congo; Benue–Congo; Bantoid; Southern Bantoid; Bantu; Northeast Bantu; Upland Bantu; Thagiicu
- Early form: Proto-Thagiicu

Language codes
- ISO 639-3: –
- Glottolog: cent2274

The Thagiicu or Central Kenya Bantu languages are a group of closely related Northeast Bantu languages spoken in the central regions of Kenya and parts of northern Tanzania.

== History ==
Proto-Thagiicu originated on the southern slopes of Mount Kenya in 1100AD. The thagiicu languages have received influence from cushitic, Nilotic and Kuliak speakers whom the Thagiicu community have absorbed over the millennia.

== Classification ==
The Thagiicu languages are classified by Glottolog as follows:

- Thagiicu
  - Eastern Kirinyaga
    - Chuka
    - Northern Kirinyaga
      - Nithi-Meru
        - Meru
        - Mwimbu-Muthambi
      - Tharaka
  - Embu
  - Kikuyu-Temi
    - Kikuyu
    - Temi
  - Kamba-Dhaiso
    - Dhaiso
    - Kamba
