= Alawa =

Alawa may refer to:

- Alawa people, an ethnic group of Australia
- Alawa language, an Australian language
- Alawa language (Tanzania), a Cushitic language of Tanzania
- Alawa, Northern Territory, a suburb of Darwin, Australia
- Nadia Alawa, charity founder

== See also ==
- Alava (disambiguation)
- Alagwa (disambiguation)
