= Manda-Matumba language =

Bantu language of Tanzania

Manda
- Native to: Tanzania
- Ethnicity: Manda
- Native speakers: 22,000 (2002)
- Language family: Niger–Congo?: Atlantic–Congo; Volta-Congo; Benue–Congo; Bantoid; Southern Bantoid; Bantu; Northeast Bantu; South Tanzania Highlands Bantu; Manda-Ngoni; Manda
- Dialects: Matumba

Language codes
- ISO 639-3: mgs
- Glottolog: mand1423
- Guthrie code: N.11
- ELP: Manda (Tanzania)
- Linguasphere: 99-AUS-ra

Manda, or Manda-Matumba, is a Bantu language of Tanzania.
