= Burunge people =

Ethnic group from Dodoma Region, Tanzania

Burunge
Waburunge

Total population
- 30,000 (2007)

Regions with significant populations
- Tanzania Dodoma Region (Chemba District)

Languages
- Burunge & Swahili

Religion
- Christian; African Traditional Religion

Related ethnic groups
- Iraqw, Gorowa, Alagwa, Kw'adza, Cushitic peoples

The Burunge or Burungi (Waburungi, in Swahili) are a Cushitic ethnic group and among Iraqw Communities based in the Chemba District, Dodoma of Dodoma Region in central Tanzania. They speak the Burunge language as a mother tongue, which belongs to the South Cushitic branch of the Afro-Asiatic family. In 2007, the Burunge population was estimated at 30,000 individuals.

== Overview ==
The Burunge are native to northeastern Tanzania, in the Chemba District, Dodoma of the Dodoma region, southeast of the Langi, Goima, Chambalo, and Mirambu villages. Cushitic-speaking Burungi and Sandawe had a tradition of rock painting. The land in this region is generally described as scattered brush, and the Burunge have historically used the land for farming and cattle grazing and watering. In more recent times this has changed as land has been privatized in order to form Wildlife Management Areas (WMAs) - these are areas that are to be used solely for wildlife conservation, and as such are off limits to farmers who used to graze and water their livestock in these areas. As a result of the formation of the Wildlife Management Areas, and the close proximity to Tarangire National Park, most of the land in this area is used for tourism safaris.
