= Vwanji language =

Bantu language in Tanzania

Wanji
- Ekivwanji
- Native to: Tanzania
- Ethnicity: Wanji
- Native speakers: 28,000 (2003)
- Language family: Niger–Congo?: Atlantic–Congo; Benue–Congo; Bantoid; Bantu; Northeast Bantu; Bena–Kinga (G60); Wanji

Language codes
- ISO 639-3: wbi
- Glottolog: vwan1235
- Guthrie code: G.66
- Linguasphere: 99-AUS-ue

Wanji, or Vwanji, is a Bantu language of Tanzania.

== Phonology ==
The syllable structure of Vwanji is CV.

== Writing system ==
Vwanji alphabet
a	aa	b	d	e	ee	f	g	gh	h	i
ii	ɨ	ɨɨ	j	k	l	m	mb	mh	n	nd
n	ngʼ	ngʼh	nh	nj	nk	ns	nt	ny	o	oo
p	s	t	u	uu	ʉ	ʉʉ	v	w	y	ʼ

== Grammar ==
Vwangi has twenty noun classes and six series of pronouns. Nouns and certain other word classes may have an augment. Three levels of past tense and two levels of future tense are distinguished. Aspectual distinctions include anterior, persistive and habitual. Future tenses are marked as either certain or uncertain.
