= Northeast Coast Bantu languages =

Bantu languages of Eastern Africa

Northeast Coast Bantu
- Geographic distribution: Tanzania, Kenya, Comoros and Somalia
- Linguistic classification: Niger–Congo?: Atlantic–Congo; Volta–Congo; Benue–Congo; Bantoid; Southern Bantoid; Bantu; Northeast Bantu; Northeast Coast Bantu

Language codes
- ISO 639-3: –
- Glottolog: nort3209

The Northeast Coast Bantu languages are the Bantu languages spoken along the coast of Tanzania and Kenya, and including inland Tanzania as far as Dodoma. In Guthrie's geographic classification, they fall within Bantu zones G and E.

The languages, or clusters, are:

- Pare-Taveta (G20+E70):
  - Pareic
    - Pare, Mbugu
  - Taveta
- Sabaki (G40+E70): Swahili, Nyika, Comorian etc.
- Seuta (G20+G30): Shambala, Bondei, Zigula (Mushungulu), Ngulu
- Ruvu (G30+G10): Gogo, Sagara, Vidunda, Kaguru, Luguru, Kutu, Kami, Zaramo, Kwere, Doe

The Ruvu languages are 60–70% similar lexically.

Mbugu (Ma'a) is a mixed language based largely on Pare.
