= Taita language =

Bantu language spoken in Kenya

Taita
- Native to: Kenya
- Ethnicity: Taita
- Native speakers: (370,000 cited 1992 – 2009 census)
- Language family: Niger–Congo?: Atlantic–Congo; Volta-Congo; Benue–Congo; Bantoid; Southern Bantoid; Bantu; Northeast Bantu; Kilimanjaro-Taita; Taita–Sagalla; Taita
- Dialects: Dawʼida; Kasigau

Language codes
- ISO 639-3: dav
- Glottolog: tait1249
- Guthrie code: E.74,741

Taita is a Bantu language spoken in the Taita Hills of Kenya. It is closely related to the Chaga languages of Kenya and Tanzania. The Saghala (Sagala, Sagalla) variety is distinct enough to be considered a language separate from the Dawʼida and Kasigau dialects.

Dawʼida and Saghala contain loanwords from two different South Cushitic languages, called Taita Cushitic, which are now extinct. It is likely that the Cushitic speakers were assimilated fairly recently, since lateral obstruents in the loanwords were still pronounced as such within living memory. However, those consonants have now been replaced by Bantu sounds.

The Taveta language was mistaken for Dawʼida by Jouni Maho in his (2009) classification of Bantu languages. However, it is a distinct language, lexically and grammatically closest to Chasu (Pare).

== Phonology ==
Dawʼida Consonants
		Labial	Alveolar	Palatal	Velar	Glottal
Plosive	Voiceless	p	t	tʃ	k	
Plosive	Voiced	b	d	dʒ	g	
Plosive	Implosive	ɓ	ɗ			
Fricative	Voiceless	f	s	ʃ		h
Fricative	Voiced	v	z		ɣ	
Nasal		m	n	ɲ	ŋ	
Approximant		β	l	j	w	
Trill			r			

Taita allows a syllabic /m̩/ to occur before any other consonant. Otherwise, the only consonant clusters involve any consonant followed by /w/; and a voiced stop preceded by a homorganic nasal.

Dawʼida Vowels
	Front	Central	Back
High	i		u
Mid	e		o
Low		a	

There is no phonemic vowel length. However, all possible sequences of two vowels occur across two syllables except for /iu/, /uu/, and /ou/.

=== Tone ===
Taita has two tones: high (H) and low (L). An underlying word-final high tone is realized as a low tone unless the previous syllable is also high.
