= Kutu language =

Bantu language of Tanzania

Kutu
- Native to: Tanzania
- Native speakers: (45,000 cited 1987)
- Language family: Niger–Congo?: Atlantic–Congo; Benue–Congo; Bantoid; Bantu; Northeast Bantu; Northeast Coast Bantu; Ruvu (G30+G10); Kutu

Language codes
- ISO 639-3: kdc
- Glottolog: kutu1263
- Guthrie code: G.37

Kutu is a Bantu language of the Morogoro region of Tanzania. The language is spoken by the Kutu people.
