= Kwere language =

Language

Ngh’wele
- Kwere
- Native to: Tanzania
- Ethnicity: Kwere people
- Native speakers: 150,000 (2009)
- Language family: Niger–Congo?: Atlantic–Congo; Benue–Congo; Bantoid; Bantu; Northeast Bantu; Northeast Coast Bantu; Ruvu (G30+G10); Ngh’wele

Language codes
- ISO 639-3: cwe
- Glottolog: kwer1261
- Guthrie code: G.32

Ngh’wele, or Kwere, is a Bantu language of the Morogoro and Dodoma regions of Tanzania.
