= Burunge language =

Afro-Asiatic language

Burunge
- Burungaisoo
- Native to: Tanzania
- Region: Dodoma
- Ethnicity: 30,000 Burunge (2007)
- Native speakers: 28,000 (2009)
- Language family: Afro-Asiatic: Cushitic; South; Rift; West; Burunge
- Writing system: Latin

Language codes
- ISO 639-3: bds
- Glottolog: buru1320
- ELP: Burunge

Burunge (also Bulunge, Burunga Iso, Burungee, Burungi, Kiburunge, Mbulungi, Mbulungwe) is an Afro-Asiatic language spoken in Tanzania in the Dodoma Region, by the Burunge people, a small community of about 28,000 native speakers that live in the Northeastern region of Tanzania. The Burunge belong to a cluster of Tanzanian groups known as Southern Cushites; Burunge is classified as part of the South Cushitic language family. The Burunge live in close proximity to speakers of other languages such as the Rangi, Gogo and Sandawe. Ultimately, their language and culture is endangered by a dwindling number of speakers and absorption by larger tribes.

== Name ==
Burunge is a language spoken by a clan of peoples of the same name, and it belongs to a larger "Cushitic" language family which is one of the largest and most important in East Africa. Thirty million people in the region trace their native language back to the Cushitic language family. Burunge has no known dialects, but it does share a high similarity with the Alagwa language – a different Cushitic language spoken in the same Dodoma Region as Burunge.

== Phonology ==
=== Consonants ===
		Labial	Alveolar		Palatal	Velar		Uvular		Pharyngeal	Glottal
		Labial	plain	lateral	Palatal	plain	lab.	plain	lab.	Pharyngeal	Glottal
Plosive/ Affricate	voiceless	p	t		t͡ʃ	k	kʷ	q	qʷ		ʔ
Plosive/ Affricate	voiced	b	d		d͡ʒ	ɡ	ɡʷ				
Plosive/ Affricate	ejective			t͡ɬʼ	t͡ʃʼ						
Fricative	voiceless	f	s	ɬ		x	xʷ			ħ	h
Fricative	voiced									ʕ	
Nasal		m	n		ɲ	ŋ					
Trill/Tap			r								
Approximant				l	j		w				

Prenasalization is also said to occur among plosives and fricatives.

- /r/ may also be heard as a tap [ɾ].
- /t͡ʃ/ may also be heard as a stop [c] in free variation.
- /d͡ʒ/ may also be heard as [ɟ] or [ʄ] in free variation.
- /q/ may be heard as [q͡χ], [qʼ] or [kʼ] in various positions.
- /ɡ/ may also be heard as an implosive [ɠ] in free variation.
- Pharyngeal sounds /ħ, ʕ/ may also be heard as epiglottal sounds [ʜ, ʢ] in free variation.
- /h/ may be heard as voiced [ɦ] in intervocalic positions.

=== Vowels ===
	Front	Central	Back
Close	i iː		u uː
Mid	e eː		o oː
Open		a aː	

Voiceless vowels may also occur as /i̥, ḁ, u̥/.

== History ==
The modern use of the term "Cushite" is used to describe the cultural descendants of ancient cultures in northeastern Africa. The heritage of these descendants is traced back through languages that are descended from their ancient ancestors. Thus, the term "Cushite" is a linguistic grouping rather than a racial or cultural designation. This method of characterization allows for a more clear cut historical lineage than just identifying by cultural groups. Therefore, peoples of Cushite heritage are those who speak languages of the Cushite grouping of the Afro-Asiatic family, and as a result of this categorization or clustering on the basis of language, the Cushitic peoples can exhibit diverse physical and racial features.

The Burunge belong to the Southern Cushites in Tanzania; their ancestors are believed to have originated from Southern Ethiopia and migrated into the northeastern region of Tanzania around 1000 BC. After migration into Tanzania, the ancient Burunge culture centered on subsistence farming and cattle grazing. Although the Burunge originally came from the region of what is now Ethiopia, there is a marked difference between the languages of the Southern Cushites in Tanzania and the Cushites of Southern Ethiopia which suggests that a long period of isolation and linguistic differentiation has occurred between the Burunge migration and present day.

== Present day ==
Burunge both as a language and distinct designation of peoples are in danger of disappearing as a result of the dominance of Swahili in Tanzania, the small population of Burunge speakers, and also the Burunge clan of approximately thirteen thousand being absorbed into stronger, more populous clans. The Rangi is one such clan; they are a neighbouring clan with their own specific language, and not only do they have a larger population than the Burunge, they are also more economically advantaged. The Rangi have subgroup "clubs" within their clan, that male members of the Burunge can officially join to become a member of the Rangi clan. Once someone is a member, they have to shed their identity as a Burunge and become completely Rangi by marrying a Rangi woman and raising their children as Rangi. Many Burunge have joined the Rangi this way over the past few decades, so it is unclear if Burunge as a people and language group will continue to exist as a distinct and separate culture, as the new generations born of both Burunge and Rangi heritage will be seen as and taught only Rangi language and culture.

== Bibliography ==
- Lamberti, M. (1991). Cushitic and its classifications. Anthropos, (H. 4./6), 552–561.
- Stegen, O. (2003, June). How does their language survive?. In talk presented at the meeting of the Language in Context Research Group, University of Edinburgh.
- Goldman, M. J., & Riosmena, F. (2013). Adaptive capacity in Tanzanian Maasailand: Changing strategies to cope with drought in fragmented landscapes. Global Environmental Change, 23(3), 588–597.
- http://strategyleader.org/articles/cushite.html
- Roland Kießling. 2000. Eine Grammatik des Burunge. Afrikanistische Forschungen Band 13. Cologne: Rüdiger Köppe Verlag.
