= Mbugwe–Rangi languages =

Mbugwe–Rangi
- Linguistic classification: Niger–Congo?: Atlantic–Congo; Volta-Congo; Benue–Congo; Bantoid; Southern Bantoid; Bantu (Zone F.30); Mbugwe–Rangi

Language codes
- ISO 639-3: –
- Glottolog: mbug1243

Mbugwe–Rangi are a pair of Bantu languages left after the languages of Zone F.30 in Guthrie's classification were reclassified. According to Nurse & Philippson (2003), they form a valid node.

Mbugwe, Rangi (Langi)
