= Álava (disambiguation) =

Álava may refer to:

- Álava (Spanish Congress Electoral District)
- Álava (province)

People

- Miguel Ricardo de Álava y Esquivel
- Ignacio Maria de Álava y Sáenz de Navarrete

== See also ==
- Alawa (disambiguation)
