= Kilimanjaro-Taita languages =

Group of languages spoken in Tanzania and Kenya

Kilimanjaro-Taita
- Chaga-Taita
- Geographic distribution: Kilimanjaro Region, Taita-Taveta County
- Linguistic classification: Niger–Congo?: Atlantic–Congo; Volta-Congo; Benue–Congo; Bantoid; Southern Bantoid; Bantu; Northeast Bantu; Kilimanjaro-Taita
- Proto-language: Proto-Kilimanjaro-Taita
- Subdivisions: Kilimanjaro Bantu; Taita language

Language codes
- Glottolog: kili1269

The Kilimanjaro-Taita or Chaga-taita languages are a group of languages spoken in the northern Tanzania and southeastern Kenya.
