= Luguru language =

Language

Luguru
- Ikiruguru
- Native to: Tanzania
- Ethnicity: Luguru
- Native speakers: (690,000 cited 2001)
- Language family: Niger–Congo?: Atlantic–Congo; Benue–Congo; Bantoid; Bantu; Northeast Bantu; Northeast Coast Bantu; Ruvu (G30+G10); Luguru

Language codes
- ISO 639-3: ruf
- Glottolog: lugu1238
- Guthrie code: G.35

Luguru (Swahili: Kiluguru) is a Bantu language spoken by the Luguru people of the Morogoro region and the Pwani region of Tanzania. The name is also spelled Lughuru, Lugulu, Ruguru. It is closely related to Gogo and Zaramo, but is not intelligible with other languages.
