= Mbugwe language =

Bantu language spoken in Tanzania

Mbugwe
- Keemboowɛ
- Native to: Tanzania
- Ethnicity: Mbugwe
- Native speakers: (24,000 cited 1999)
- Language family: Niger–Congo?: Atlantic–Congo; Benue–Congo; Southern Bantoid; Bantu (Zone F); Mbugwe–Rangi (F.30); Mbugwe

Language codes
- ISO 639-3: mgz
- Glottolog: mbug1242
- Guthrie code: F.34

Mbugwe or Mbuwe (Kimbugwe) is a Bantu language spoken by the Mbugwe people of Lake Manyara in the Manyara Region of Central Tanzania. Mbugwe is estimated to be spoken by some 34,000 people.

Mbugwe is isolated from other Bantu languages, being bordered by the locally dominant Cushitic language Iraqw to the west, the Gorowa language (or dialect of Iraqw) to the south, the Nilotic Maasai language to the east, and the lake to the north. It shares about 70% vocabulary with its Bantu cousin Rangi.

== Grammar ==
As is common across Bantu languages, Mbugwe employs a system of noun classes. There are 16 noun classes. The subclasses 1a and 15a are also identified.

The syntax is head-initial with adjectives and other modifiers appearing after the noun. Demonstratives may sometimes appear before the head noun.

== Phonology ==
Mbugwe is considered to be a seven-vowel language. It is a tonal language with two levels of tone identified - High and Low. Tone is distinctive lexically as well as grammatically.

== Genetic affiliation ==
The language most closely related to Mbugwe is Rangi spoke in the Kondoa District of Central Tanzania. Mbugwe has been classified as F.34 following Guthrie's Bantu classification.

The Mbugu people, today located further east in the Usambara Mountains, maintain an oral history of having lived among the Mbugwe, and the names of the languages could be cognate; but the Mbugu language does not appear to have any especial relation with Mbugwe.
