= Vidunda language =

Bantu language of Tanzania

Vidunda
- Native to: Tanzania
- Native speakers: (32,000 cited 1987)
- Language family: Niger–Congo?: Atlantic–Congo; Benue–Congo; Bantoid; Bantu; Northeast Bantu; Northeast Coast Bantu; Ruvu (G30+G10); Vidunda

Language codes
- ISO 639-3: vid
- Glottolog: vidu1238
- Guthrie code: G.38
- ELP: Vidunda

Vidunda (Chividunda) is a Bantu language spoken along the north bank of the Ruaha River in Tanzania. It belongs to the Ruvu branch of Northeast Coast Bantu.
