= Zaramo language =

Bantu language spoken in Tanzania

Zaramo
- Kizaramo
- Native to: Tanzania
- Region: Pwani Region
- Ethnicity: 657,000 Zaramo (2000)
- Native speakers: 293,000 (2009)
- Language family: Niger–Congo?: Atlantic–Congo; Benue–Congo; Bantoid; Bantu; Northeast Bantu; Northeast Coast Bantu; Ruvu; Zaramo
- Writing system: Latin

Language codes
- ISO 639-3: zaj
- Glottolog: zara1247
- Guthrie code: G.33
- ELP: Zaramo

Zaramo is a Niger-Congo language, formerly primary language of the Zaramo people of eastern Tanzania. Zaramo is also known as Zalamo, Kizaramo, Dzalamo, Zaramu, Saramo and, Myagatwa. The language is critically endangered. The ethnic population of the Zaramo people reaches about 200,000, yet there are only a few elderly speakers remaining.

These speakers are mostly located in the villages surrounding the city of Dar es Salaam. Zaramo is thought to be passed down matrilineally to the children in these villages, while it remains critically endangered in the city.

There are very few translations of the language in existence except for a few native speakers' documented translations, and the publication of the New Testament from 1975.

== Classification ==
Zaramo is genetically tied to the Niger-Congo language family. It is classified under the Atlantic-Congo, Volta-Congo, Benue-Congo, Bantoid, Southern, Narrow Bantu, Central, G, and Zigula-Zaramo families. (G.33)

== History ==
Zaramo is the official language of a Bantu tribe located in the coastal area surrounding the former capital city of Tanzania, Dar es Salaam. Linguistic evidence supports the theory that Zaramo originated from the Luguru tribe. A migration of the Zaramo people eastward from their original location in Tanzania has been the source of slight changes in their cultural language.

The Zaramo as they are known today are made up of clans that migrated from the Kutu and the Luguru around 1700. Their common ancestry with the Luguru is substantiated, in that they have the same common language with only slight dialectal variations. The language of the Zaramo is mutually intelligible with those of the Jutu, the Luguru, the Kwere, and the Kami. Most Zaramo people of today chose to speak the lingua franca of Tanzania.

While the ethnic population of the Zaramo people reaches about 200,000, today there are only a few elderly speakers of Zaramo language. Most Zaramo people speak Swahili as their first language today and have adopted Swahili-Arabic names. They favor the Swahili over their endangered dialect for its broad use in communication and trade.

== Phonology ==
=== Vowels ===
Vowels are noted as /i, e, a, o, u/.

=== Consonants ===
		Labial	Alveolar	Palatal	Velar
Plosive	voiceless	p	t	c	k
Plosive	voiced	b	d	ɟ	ɡ
Fricative	voiceless	f	s	(ʃ)	
Fricative	voiced	v	z		
Nasal		m	n	ɲ	ŋ
Approximant		w	l	j	

- [ʃ] may occur in a number of words, but it is not clear if it is phonemic.
- /v, z/ may also be heard as [pf, dz] in some dialects.
- Nasal sounds may also occur as aspirated [ʰ] in stressed syllable positions.

== Geographic Distribution ==
=== Official Status ===
Zaramo is not the official language of any country or region. Currently, the only locations where Zaramo still exists is Pwani region of eastern Tanzania. This area is located between two cities - Bagamoyo and Dar es Salaam. The rural, costal area is home to the Zaramo people who are the only ethnic group to speak the language.

=== Dialects Varieties ===
There are no known dialects of Zaramo. It shares a lexical similarity: 68% with Kutu [kdc], 65% with Kami [kcu], 61% with Kwere [cwe] and Doe [doe]. This connection is substantiated by the historical relationship between the tribes.

== Examples ==
There are very few examples of Zaramo language available. A list of words and phrases was provided by a native speaker to the author of Short Specimens of the Vocabularies of Three Unpublished African Languages: Gindo, Zaramo, and Angazidja.

English word or phrase	Zaramo translation
Basket	Mgelo
Chair	Kigoda
Free space	Terak
House	Ng'anda
Town	Kayi
I do not know	Sitangile
What is your name?	Tagwa lako nani?

== Writing System ==
The Zaramo language uses Latin script for its writing system. Latin script is the most widely used writing system in the world. Some languages adapted the alphabet by the addition of entirely new letters such Zaramo, and other languages from the Niger-Congro orthographies.

== See also ==
- Zaramo people
- Languages of Tanzania
- Zaramo Ethnologue
