= Rangi people =

Ethnic group from Dodoma Region of Tanzania

Valangi
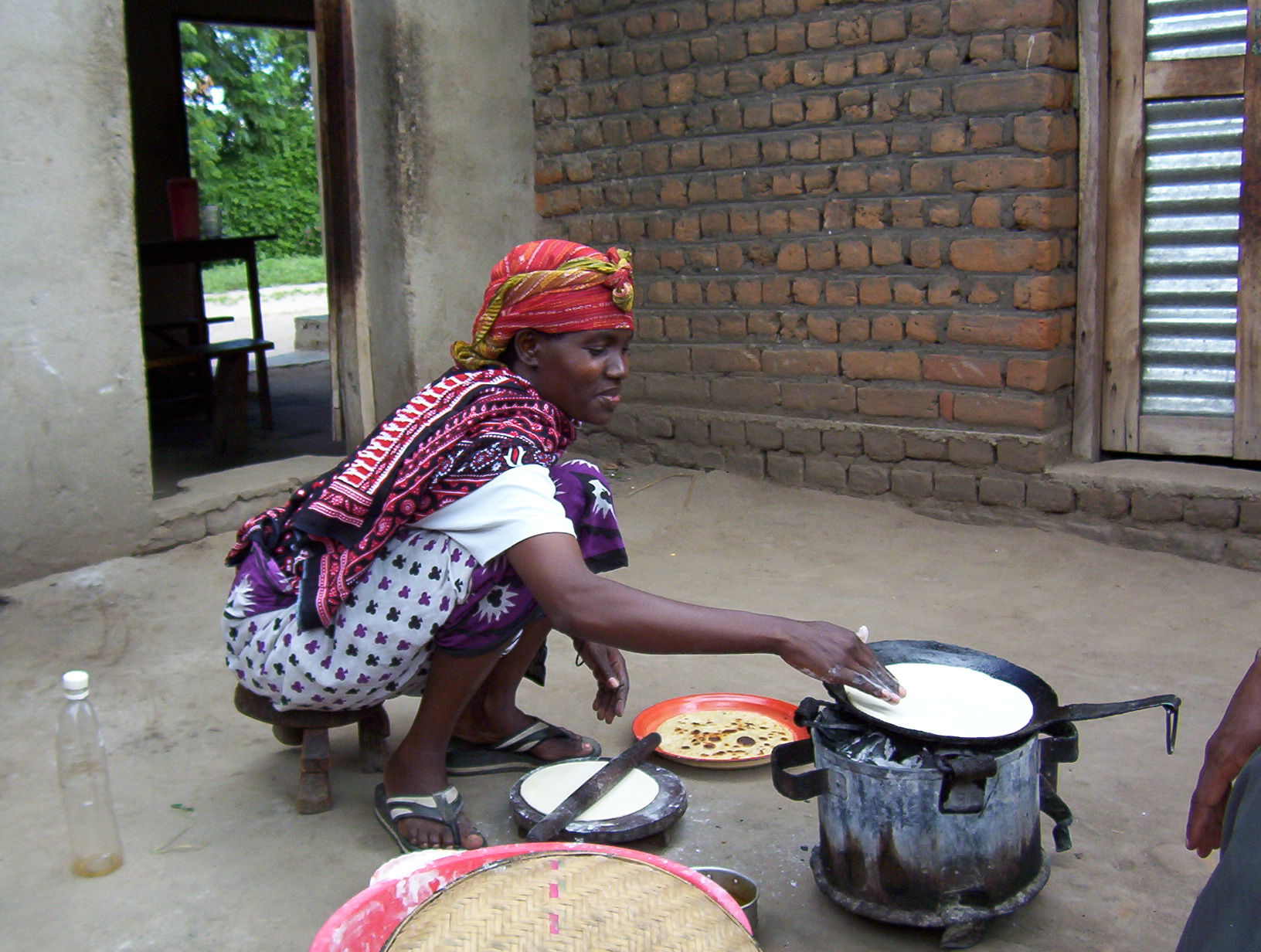
- A Rangi woman preparing chapati for her tea house in central Tanzania.

Total population
- 880,000 (2022)

Regions with significant populations
- Tanzania (Dodoma Region, specifically in Kondoa District)

Languages
- Rangi, Swahili

Religion
- Majority Islam (93%) small minorities of Christianity (7%) mainly concentrated in Haubi

Related ethnic groups
- Alagwa, Swahili

The Rangi (Rangi: Valangi; Swahili: Warangi) are a Bantu-speaking ethnic group of mixed Bantu and Cushitic heritage in the Dodoma Region of central Tanzania. In 2022, the Rangi population was estimated to number 880,000.

== Endonym & Exonym ==
The Rangi use the endonym Valangi to refer to themselves, however the Swahili exonym Warangi is more commonly used in Tanzania to refer to group. Likewise, the Rangi use the endonym Kilangi to refer to their language, but most people in Tanzania use the Swahili exonym of Kirangi instead. In English, the Swahili plural prefix of Wa and the Swahili artifact prefix of Ki are often dropped, resulting in both the people and language being referred to as Rangi.

== History ==
Sources differ on when the Rangi became a distinct ethnic group, with some suggesting approximately 300 AD and others say around the range of 1500-1700. Despite being a Bantu ethnic group, most Rangi do not believe that their ancestors came from the West, and that they actually came from the North and East (Ethiopia and Sudan). Meanwhile, other Rangi believe that their ancestors originated from the West. This makes sense as the Rangi have both Cushitic (Northeastern) and Bantu (Western) heritage. When the Rangi arrived in the Dodoma region they began assimilating surrounding Cushitic peoples, primarily the Alagwa and Burunge. The Rangi also assimilated the neighboring Nyaturu people, another Bantu ethnic group.
