= Upland Bantu languages =

Upland Bantu
- Geographic distribution: Kilimanjaro Region, Taita-Taveta County, Central Province (Kenya), Embu County, Meru County, Tharaka-Nithi County, Machakos County, Kitui County, Makueni County, Ngorongoro District, Arusha
- Linguistic classification: Niger–Congo?: Atlantic–Congo; Volta-Congo; Benue–Congo; Bantoid; Southern Bantoid; Bantu; Northeast Bantu; Upland Bantu
- Proto-language: Proto-Upland Bantu
- Subdivisions: Kilimanjaro-Taita; Thagiicu

Language codes

The Upland Bantu languages form a subgroup of the Northeast Bantu languages native to Tanzania and Kenya.

== History ==
Proto-Upland Bantu likely originated in the northern Pare Mountains. These people had a clear preference for living near forests and on the highland ridges overlooking the plains (hence their name, Upland bantu).
