= Gogo language =

Bantu language spoken in Tanzania

Gogo
- Cigogo
- Region: Dodoma Region and Manyoni (Singida Region), Tanzania
- Native speakers: 1.4 million (2019)
- Language family: Niger–Congo?: Atlantic–Congo; Benue–Congo; Bantoid; Bantu; Northeast Bantu; Northeast Coast Bantu; Ruvu; Gogo
- Writing system: Latin (Gogo alphabet)

Language codes
- ISO 639-3: gog
- Glottolog: gogo1263
- Guthrie code: G.11

Gogo is a Bantu language spoken by the Gogo people of Dodoma Region in Tanzania. The language is spoken throughout Dodoma Region and into the neighbouring district of Manyoni.

The language is considered to have three dialects: Nyambwa (Cinyambwa or West Gogo), spoken to the west of Dodoma and in Manyoni; Nyaugogo (Cinyaugogo or Central Gogo), spoken in the environs of Dodoma; and Tumba (Citumba or East Gogo), spoken to the east. The Gogo group is grouped with Kagulu, which has a 56% lexical similarity with Gogo proper. Gogo has about 50% lexical similarity with Hehe and Sangu (both Bena–Kinga languages (G.60), 48% with Kimbu and 45% with Nilamba. These last two are both in Guthrie's Zone F.

Gogo is spoken by both Christians and Muslims and is a major language of the Anglican Church of Tanzania.

== Phonology ==
=== Consonants ===
| | | Labial | Alveolar | Palatal | Velar | Glottal |
|---|---|---|---|---|---|---|
| Nasal | | m | n | ɲ | ŋ | |
| Plosive | voiceless | p | t | c | k | |
| Plosive | voiced | b | d | ɟ | ɡ | |
| Fricative | voiceless | f | s | | | h |
| Fricative | voiced | v | z | | | |
| Approximant | | | l | j | w | |

- /k, ɡ/ are heard as palatal consonant sounds when preceding /i, e/; [c, ɟ].
- /z/ can also be heard as an affricate [dz].
- Nasal consonants when preceding voiceless stops are devoiced; [m̥ n̥ ɳ̊ ŋ̊].
- Voiceless consonants are mostly aspirated occurring after nasals; [pʰ tʰ cʰ kʰ].

=== Vowels ===
| | Front | Central | Back |
|---|---|---|---|
| High | i iː | | u uː |
| Mid | e eː | | o oː |
| Low | | a aː | |
