= Meru language =

Bantu language spoken in Kenya

Meru
- Kĩmĩĩrũ
- Native to: Kenya
- Region: Meru County and Tharaka Nithi County
- Ethnicity: Ameru
- Native speakers: 2.0 million (2019 census)
- Language family: Niger–Congo?: Atlantic–Congo; Volta-Congo; Benue–Congo; Bantoid; Southern Bantoid; Bantu; Northeast Bantu; Thagiicu; North Thagiicu; Meru
- Dialects: Igembe; Igoji; Imenti; Miutini; Nuclear Meru; Tigania; Tharaka; Chuka; Mwimbi-Muthambi

Language codes
- ISO 639-3: mer
- Glottolog: meru1245
- Guthrie code: E.53,531,54,541

Meru is a Bantu language spoken by the Meru people (Ameru) who live on the Eastern and Northern slopes of Mount Kenya and on the Nyambene ranges. They settled in this area after centuries of migration from the north.

== Dialects ==
The Meru people are a fairly homogeneous community and all share a common ancestry. They speak the same language, Kimeru, with slight regional differences in accent and local words. The community comprises the following subdivisions, from the north to south:

- Igembe
- Tigania (Tiania) (culture close to neighbouring Cushitic and Nilotic communities)
- Imenti
- Tharaka (Saraka)
- Igoji
- Mwimbi–Muthambi
- Chuka (Gicuka)

As the Meru language is similar to its surrounding neighbors, the Kikuyu and Embu could have possibly adopted parts of Meru.

Kimeru has seven main mutually intelligible dialects. The dialects include Kiimenti widely used by the Imenti section of the Ameru, Tiania/gitiania used by the Tigania, kiigembe used by the Igembe, Kimwimbi used by the Mwïmbï, Kïmüthambï used by the Müthambï, Gicuka used by the Chuka and Kitharaka used by the Tharaka.

=== Imenti ===
It is the commonly used dialect in Meru. The dialect acts as the lingua franca between all the nine subtribes of Meru. It is the official dialect used in the Kimeru Bible translations. It is commonly used in Nkubu, Timau, Kibirichia, Meru town and Ruiri areas of Meru County.

=== Chuka, Muthambi and Mwimbi ===
The dialects are more related to Gikuyu and Meru proper, and are common in Igoji, Chogoria and Chuka regions of Meru County and Tharaka Nithi County.

=== Tigania and Igembe ===
The dialects are mostly spoken in Miraa or Khat growing areas of Muthara, Karama, Kangeta, Maua, Laare and Mutuati in Meru County.

=== Tharaka ===
The dialect is more closely related to the Kamba and Tigania dialects. It is most common in Tharaka areas of Tharaka Nithi County.

== Phonology ==
=== Consonants ===
Consonants of the ImentI, Igoji, Mwimbi, Muthambi & Tharaka dialects
	Labial	Dental	Alveolar	Palatal	Velar
Stop	p b		t d	c ɟ	k ɡ
Fricative	(β)	ð		ʝ	(ɣ)
Nasal	m		n	ɲ	ŋ
Trill			r		
Approximant	w			j	

Consonants of the Chuka dialect
	Labial	Dental	Alveolar	Palatal	Velar
Stop	b		t d	c ɟ	k ɡ
Fricative	(β)	ð			(ɣ)
Nasal	m		n	ɲ	ŋ
Trill			r		
Approximant	w			j	

Prenasalized sounds may also occur in word-medial and word-initial positions.

Fricatives [β, ɣ] occur mostly as allophones of stops /b, d/ in intervocalic positions.

/d/ may also be heard as [ɾ] in intervocalic positions.

=== Vowels ===
	Front	Central	Back
Close	i iː		u uː
Close-mid	e eː		o oː
Open-mid	ɛ ɛː		ɔ ɔː
Open		a aː	

== Alphabet ==
Kimeru is written in a Latin alphabet. It does not use the letters f p q s v x z, and adds the letters ĩ and ũ. The Kimeru alphabet is:

Majuscule forms (also called uppercase or capital letters)
A	B	C	D	E	G	H	I	Ĩ	J	K	M	N	O	R	T	U	Ũ	W	Y
Minuscule forms (also called lowercase or small letters)
a	b	c	d	e	g	h	i	ĩ	j	k	m	n	o	r	t	u	ũ	w	y

== Grammar ==
=== Noun classes ===
Kimeru has sixteen noun classes as tabulated below. the classes are grammatical and represent how words fit into sentences. Of the noun classes, classes 1, 3, 4, 9 and ten are irregular while the rest are regular. This implies that verbal, adjectival and conjunction concords are not the same.

Example class 1 verses class 2. class 1- Muntũ ũjũ mũraja auma Nairobi. class 2- Antũ baba baraja bauma Nairobi.

Class 1-This tall person has come from Nairobi. Class 2. These tall people have come from Nairobi. In class 1 demonstrative 'this' is ũjũ, with ũ as its concord. The adjective -raja has mũ as its concord and the verb uma has a as its concord hence 'auma'. On the other hand in class two each of the above cases have ba as a concord. The difference is only in ũjũ and baba as demonstratives is that all strong classes use double concords as demonstratives.

Noun class	Exam	This/These	Adjectival	Verbal
1- 'Müũ	Mũkũrũ	Ũjũ	Mũ-raja	A-kwija
2-Ba	Akũrũ	Baba	Ba-raja	Ba-kwija
3-Mũ	Mũti	ũũ/ũjũ	Mũ-raja	ũ-kũgwa
4-Mĩ	Mĩtĩ	ĩjĩ/ĩno	Mĩ- raja	ĩ- kũgwa
5- Ri	Riitho	Rĩrĩ	Rĩ-nene	Rĩ-kwona
6- Ma	Meetho	Jaja/Mama	Ma-nene	Ma-kwona
7-Kĩ	Kĩara	Gĩkĩ	Kĩ-nene	Gĩ-kworonta
8-Bĩ	Bĩara	Bĩbi	Bï-nene	Bï-kworonta
9-Ng'	Ng'ombe	Ïjï/Ïno	Ï-nene	Ï-güküra
10-Ng'	Ng'ombe	Ijï/Ino	I-nene	I-güküra
11-Rü	Rüreme	Rürü	Rü-raja	Rü-gücuna
10- Ng'	Ndeme	Ijï/Ino	I- ndaja	I-gücuna
12-Ka	Kana	Gaka	Ka-nini	Ga-gükena
13-Tü	Twana	Tütü	Tü-nini	Tü-gükena
14- Bü	Ücürü	Bübü	Bü-rüru	Bü-küthira
15-Kü	Kügürü	Gükü	Gü-künene	Gü-gükinya
16-A	Antü	Aja/aa	A-nene	A-kürïmwa

Kimeru follows Dahl's law thus a "K" syllable cannot follow a "K' syllable.

== Sample phrases ==
English	Kimeru
How are you	Muuga
Give me water	Nkundia rũũji/rũi
How are you doing?	Ũrĩ ümwega?
I am hungry	Ndĩna mpara
Help me	Nteithia/Ntethia
I am good	Ndĩ mwega
Are you a friend?	Wĩ mũcore?
Bye, be blessed	Tigwa bwega, tharimwa.
I love you	Inkwendete.
Come here	Ĩja aja/ Iyu aa
I will phone you	Ngakũringira thimũ
I want a cassava	Ndũmia mũanga/mĩanga

=== Dialects ===
English	Chuka/Muthambi/Mwimbi	TIgania/Igembe	Tharaka	Imenti
How are you	Muuga	Muua	Muuga	Nĩatĩa ũrĩ? Muuga?
Give me water to drink	nkundia rũnjĩ/rüjÏ	Nkundia Rũĩ	Nkundia rũũyĩ	Nkundia rũũji rwa kunywa
Home	Mũcii	Mucie/Mucii	Mũciĩ	Nja/Mũciĩ
Get out	Uma nja	Tũra	Uma nja	Uma njaa/ome
Get Inside	Kũrũka/Tonya/Thungira	Unkuma	Thũngĩra	Kũrũka/Tonya
Today	Ũmũnthi	Ruarii	Ĩmunthĩ	Naarua
Tomorrow	Rũjũ/Rũũ	Rũũ/Rũyũ	Rũũ	Rũüjü
Come here	Üka/Njü aa	Ĩya haa/iyu haa	Ncũ aga	Ĩja aja
I will phone you	Ngakũringira/Ngakubũrira thimũ	Ngakũringira thimũ	Ngakũringĩra thimũ	Ngakũringira thimũ
Take				Jũkia
Tell me				Mbĩra
Am sorry				Ndekera

== In popular culture ==
A Kenyan musical group known as High Pitch Band Afrika based in Meru County has done a cover of the Luis Fonsi's popular hit single Despacito in Kimeru. The Kimeru cover was uploaded on YouTube on July 10, 2017, and has generated over 500,000 views since then.

== Media ==
In Media the Kimeru language is used as the primary broadcast language of several Radio and TV stations in Kenya. Some include: Meru Fm, Muuga Fm, Weru Fm, Weru TV, Baite TV, Thiiri Fm among many others.
