= Sagalla language =

Bantu language of Kenya

Sagalla
- Kisagala
- Native to: Kenya
- Ethnicity: Taita people
- Native speakers: (undated figure of 100,000)
- Language family: Niger–Congo?: Atlantic–Congo; Benue–Congo; Bantoid; Bantu; Northeast Bantu; Chaga–Taita; Taita–Sagalla; Sagalla

Language codes
- ISO 639-3: tga
- Glottolog: saga1262
- Guthrie code: E.74
- ELP: Sagalla

Sagalla (also known as Kisagala, Kisagalla, Sagala, Teri or Saghala) is a Bantu language of Kenya. It is closely related to the Chaga languages of Kenya and Tanzania.
