= Kikuyu language =

Bantu language in Kenya

Kikuyu
- Gĩkũyũ
- Pronunciation: [ɣekòjó]
- Native to: Kenya
- Region: Central Province
- Ethnicity: Agĩkũyũ
- Native speakers: 8.3 million (2019 census)
- Language family: Niger–Congo?: Atlantic–Congo; Volta–Congo; Benue–Congo; Bantoid; Southern Bantoid; Bantu; Northeast Bantu; Upland Bantu; Thagiicu; Kikuyu–Temi; Kikuyu
- Dialects: Gichugu; Mathira; Ndia; Northern Gikuyu; Southern Gikuyu
- Writing system: Latin script; Gicandi script

Language codes
- ISO 639-1: ki
- ISO 639-2: kik
- ISO 639-3: kik
- Glottolog: kiku1240
- Guthrie code: E.51

- Person: MũGĩkũyũ
- People: AGĩkũyũ
- Language: GĩGĩkũyũ
- Country: Bũrũrĩ Wa Gĩkũyũ

Kikuyu or Gikuyu (Gikuyu: Gĩkũyũ [ɣekòjó]) (also known as Gĩgĩkũyũ) is a Bantu language spoken by the Gĩkũyũ (Agĩkũyũ) of Kenya. Kikuyu is mainly spoken in the area encompassing the former Central Province (between Nyeri, Kirinyaga, Kiambu, Murang'a and Nyahururu) and surrounding areas like Nairobi, Nakuru and Laikipia. The Kikuyu people traditionally identify their ancestral lands by the surrounding mountain ranges in Central Kenya, including Mount Kenya, which they call Kĩrĩmanyaga and the Aberdare Range.

== Phonology ==
Symbols shown in angle brackets replace the IPA symbols which are not in the orthography.

=== Vowels ===
Vowel phonemes
| | Front | Central | Back |
|---|---|---|---|
| Close | i | | u |
| Close-mid | e ⟨ĩ⟩ | | o ⟨ũ⟩ |
| Open-mid | ɛ ⟨e⟩ | | ɔ ⟨o⟩ |
| Open | | a | |

=== Consonants ===
Consonant phonemes
| | | Labial | Dental/ Alveolar | Palatal (-alveolar) | Velar | Glottal |
|---|---|---|---|---|---|---|
| Nasal | | m | n | ɲ ⟨ny⟩ | ŋ ⟨ng'⟩ | |
| Plosive/ Affricate | voiceless | (p) | t | | k | |
| Plosive/ Affricate | prenasal | ᵐb ⟨mb⟩ | ⁿd ⟨nd⟩ | ᶮdʒ ⟨nj⟩ | ᵑg ⟨ng⟩ | |
| Fricative | | β ⟨b⟩ | ð ⟨th⟩ | ʃ ⟨c⟩ | ɣ ⟨g⟩ | h |
| Liquid | | | ɾ ⟨r⟩ | j ⟨y⟩ | w | |

- [p] is rare, only occurring in loanwords and ideophones.
- /t k/ occur with varying degrees of aspiration [tʰ kʰ] in free variation.
- /ᵐb ⁿd ᶮdʒ ᵑɡ/ occur with varying degrees of prenasalization; it can be absent altogether, resulting in oral voiced [b d dʒ ɡ].
- /β/ may be realized as voiceless or voiced, bilabial [ɸ, β] or labiodental [f, v], in free variation.
- /ɾ/ may be realized as a voiceless or voiced tap [ɾ̥, ɾ], as a trill [r], as a median [ɹ] or lateral [l] approximant, but realizations other than [ɾ] are infrequent.

=== Tones ===
Like most Bantu languages, Kikuyu is a tonal language. It has two level tones (high and low), a low-high rising tone, and downstep. Though most syllables have an underlying tone, some have no underlying tone and instead are the object of tone spreading.

Tone can often be integral to clear communication in Kikuyu, especially in verb phrases where prefixes tend to cause otherwise distinct verb roots to appear similar or even identical if not for tone.

| Kikuyu | IPA | English Translation |
|---|---|---|
| nĩarokire | [néá.ɾɔ́ː.kí.ɾɛ̀] | she came yesterday |
| nĩarokire | [néá.ɾɔ́ː.kì.ɾɛ́] | she woke up earliest (today) |
| enda hau | [ɛ̀.ⁿdá] | love (imperative) |
| enda hau | [ɛ́ː.ⁿdà] | he/she loves |
| mwaki | [mwà.kí] | builder |
| mwaki | [mwà.kì] | fire |

=== Downstep ===
Kikuyu exhibits tonal downstep that can be triggered either by the presence of an assertive verb or by a floating low tone hanging at the end of certain nouns. The floating low tones are a result of historical tone shift which was productive until the mid-20th century at latest, causing the tones of all syllables to shift rightward by one step. If a word ended in a low tone, the low tone would be detached and would no longer be traditionally pronounced outside of downstep. If one ended in a high tone preceded by another high tone, the floating high tone would be deleted. However, if the high tone was preceded by a low tone it would cause the formation of the low-rising tone seen at the end of many Kikuyu words.

| English | Proto-Bantu | Tharaka | Kikamba | Mwimbi | Kikuyu |
|---|---|---|---|---|---|
| belonging to someone | *-jéné | -ɛ́nɛ́ | -ɛ́nɛ́ | -ɛ́nɛ́ | -ɛ̀nɛ̌ |
| neck | *-kíᵑgɔ̀ | ᵑkíᵑgɔ́ | ᵑgíᵑgɔ́ | ᵑkíᵑgɔ́ | ᵑgìᵑgɔ̌ |
| way of releasing oneself quickly | *-dèk- | moěrɛ̀kángériɛ́ | moélɛ̀kángériɛ́ | moělɛ́kángériɛ́ | moèrɛ́kàngériɛ́ |
| tree | *-tɪ́ | moté | moté | moté | motě |
| bushland | *càká | keðàká | keðɛ̀ká | keðàká | ɣeðàkǎ |
| bamboo | *-dàᵑgɪ́ | moràᵑgí | moàᵑgí | molàᵑgí | moràᵑgǐ |
| charcoal | *-kádà | ekárà | ekáȁ | ekálà | ikàrá` |
| big | *-nénè | -nɛ́nɛ̀ | -nɛ́nɛ̏ | -nɛ́nɛ̀ | -nɛ̀nɛ́` |

In Kikuyu, the presence of downstep can trigger three possible interactions with the following tones:

1. In the conditions /Hꜜ#H/, /Lꜜ#H/ and /Lꜜ#L/, lowering of the next tone occurs. This lowers the entire F0 value of the phonological phrase, meaning the lowered L tones are audibly identical to a super-low (SL) tone, and lowered H tones are audibly identical to an L tone.
2. In the conditions /Hꜜ#L(L...)H/ and /Hꜜ#L(L...)/, since the sequence [/HꜜL/] is banned, all the following underlying L tones are first raised to H tones until an underlying H tone is reached, which is then the object of downstep. This is often referred to as unbounded H-tone spreading.

Negative verbs appear to have unpredictable downstep patterns. As negative verbs may or may not be assertive depending on the speakers intention during utterance, more research is needed to determine the source of verbal downstep. Additionally, a body of data on the tonal structure of most Gĩkũyũ nouns has not yet been assembled, aside from T.G. Benson's 1964 dictionary, which has clashing data with sources such as Clements 1984.

=== Vowel harmony ===
Kikuyu features a vowel height-based harmony system similar to that in Kiswahili. In verbs, underlying [o] and [e] may appear as [ɔ] and [ɛ] if the root of a word contains either of the latter two. The effect can be shown by contrasting the two verbs: hũrĩra ('hit for') and horera ('cool for'), where neither *horĩra nor *hũrera are possible.

In non-verbs, the [e] of a prefix preceding [i] in a root can morph to [i], shown in rĩ- appearing as riitho ('eye'), and [o] in a prefix appears as [u] when preceding either [u] or [ɔ]. This is shown with the prefix kũ- in the words kuona and kuuma.

== Alphabet ==
Kikuyu is written in a Latin alphabet. It does not use the letters f l p q s v x z, and adds the letters ĩ and ũ. The Kikuyu alphabet is:

a b c d e g h i ĩ j k m n o r t u ũ w y

== Grammar ==
Gĩkũyũ has subject–verb–object word order. It uses prepositions rather than postpositions. Nouns are followed by possessive and demonstrative pronouns, which can coexist in that order, and subsequently adjectives, quantifiers, and numerals, which have no order among themselves.

=== Noun classes ===
Gĩkũyũ has 17 noun classes.

Gĩkũyũ Noun Classes
| NC | English | Gĩkũyũ | Noun Agreement | | Verb Agreement | | Assignment Pattern |
| NC | English | Gĩkũyũ | Noun | Adjective | Subject | Object | Assignment Pattern |
|---|---|---|---|---|---|---|---|
| 1 | person | mũndũ | mũ- | | a- | -mũ- | animate nouns; people; prefixless kinship terms |
| 2 | people | andũ | a- | | -ma- | | plural of 1 |
| 3 | tail | mũting'oe | mũ- | | ũ- | -mũ- | plants; 'method' nouns; other |
| 4 | tails | mĩting'oe | mĩ- | | ĩ- | -mĩ- | plural of 3 |
| 5 | pineapple tooth | rĩinabu igego | rĩ-(V) i-(C) | | | -rĩ- | some body parts; other |
| 6 | teeth | magego | -ma- | | | | plural of 5, 14; occasionally of 9, 11, 12, 15 (body parts); rarely of 1, 7 |
| 7 | valley sieve | kĩanda gĩcungi | -kĩ- -gĩ- | | | | augmentatives; other |
| 8 | valleys sieves | cianda icungi | ci-(V) i-(C) | N- | ci-(V) i-(C) | -ci- | plural of 7 |
| 9 | dog | ngui | N- | | ĩ- | -mĩ- | most animals; most loanwords; other unrelated nouns |
| 10 | dogs | ngui | N- | | i- | -mi- | plural of 9, 11 |
| 11 | hawk | rwĩgĩ | rũ- | | | | long, thin, or string-like objects; other |
| 12 | infant calf | kaana gacaũ | ka- ga- | | | | diminutives; other |
| 13 | infants | twana | tũ- | | | | plural of 12 |
| 14 | night | ũtukũ | ũ- | mũ- | ũ- | -mũ- | abstract concepts; rarely other unrelated nouns |
| 15 | to tire ear | kũnoga gũtũ | kũ- gũ- | | | | infinitives; most body parts |
| 16 | here | haha | ha- | | | | definite locations |
| 17 | place here | kũndũ gũkũ | kũ- gũ- | | | | indefinite locations |

Occasionally, class 6 nouns have the prefix marĩ- or mai-, perhaps because the class 5 form is reanalyzed as the stem.

In class 11, it is hypothesized that if the prefix rũ- is added to a stem that already begins with rũ, the prefix is deleted. When the plural is class 6, the ma- sometimes attaches to the noun stem itself, and sometimes to the class 11 form.

Classes 7/8 and 12/13 prefixes can be attached to either the stem or prefix of an existing noun to convey anaugmentative or a diminutive, respectively. When this happens with classes 9/10, the prenasalisation is removed (eg. mbakũri 'bowl' becomes kabakũri 'small bowl').

=== Adjectives and pronouns ===
Adjectives agree with the noun via adjective class prefixes (usually identical to the noun class prefixes). Other modifiers do so via agreement class prefixes, which are often simply the vowel of the noun class prefix.

Personal pronouns may take the place of a noun or a noun phrase. Since person and noun class are marked on verbs, they are usually only used emphatically or in response to questions. Except for those of classes 3 and 14, the pronouns are formed by adding agreement class prefixes to the stem o.

The dependent pronoun/demonstrative - 'and/with X' - is formed by adding the comitative preposition na to the relevant personal pronouns.

The possessive pronoun is formed by adding the relevant possessive stem to the agreement class prefix of the possessed noun.

Relative pronouns are formed by adding the relevant agreement class prefix to the relative stem.

Demonstrative pronouns come in distal, proximal, and anaphoric forms. Relative pronouns are written identically to distal demonstratives, but are distinguished by vowel length - the first syllable of a relative pronoun is short, while the first syllable of a distal demonstrative is long.

Adjectives are comparatively rare, and do not cover even every colour. Qualities are usually expressed instead as associative constructions, which connect two nouns or noun phrases where the first noun (head) is modified by the second. The associative is formed by prefixing the stem a with the agreement class prefix of the head noun. It can also denote possession, location, and ordinal numerals.

=== Numbers ===
Numerals 11-19 are formed with the construction 'ten and X'. The final numeral, if it inflects, agrees with the noun being counted. However, if the final numeral is 1, it agrees with the singular class of the noun being counted, because 1 is singular, even if the overall number being formed is not.

=== Verbs ===
Verbs can be marked for focus, noun class agreement, negation, reflexivity, reciprocality, causativity, intensive meanings, reversive meanings, applicative (valency increasing) meanings, tense, and aspect.

Often there is no clear division between derivational and inflecitonal marking in verbs. Distinguishing between the two depends largely on the individual verbs themselves, and rarely on context. Some examples of affixes that can have both derivational and inflecitonal implications are:

Applicative suffix -ĩr

mũ-tũm-ĩr-e mũ-ciari ũ-horo
N1.OBJ-send-APP-IMP N1-parent N14-news
'send to your parent the news'

mũ-tũmĩr-e ũ-horo ũ-cio
N14.OBJ-use-IMP N14-news N14-DIST.DEM
'use that news'

As shown above, in some verbs, it can be valid for the same affix to act both derivationally and inflectionally. This ability is not common among verbs in Gĩkũyũ.

Reversive middle voice suffix -ũk-

mũ-rango w-a-hing-ũka
N3-door N3-IMM.PERF-close-REVERS.MID
'the door has opened' (literally: the door has become unclosed)

Wangũi nĩ-a-ra-in-ũka
Wangũi FOC-N1.SUB-PRES.IMPERF-sing/dance-REVERS.MID
'Wangũi is returning home' (literally: Wangũi is becoming no longer singing/dancing')

The meaning behind this word ina is likely derived from the idea that, in Gĩkũyũ, children away from home are said to be 'out singing/dancing', similar to how in English children are 'out playing'. This way, inũka carries a meaning similar to 'be done singing and go home'. Among speakers, the meaning mostly just means 'go home', regardless of whether someone was singing or not.

=== Tense and aspect ===
Tenses include remote past (before yesterday), past (yesterday), recent past (earlier today), present, near future (later today), and remote future (after today). There also exists an 'uncertain future' marker for verbs that denotes a time not known by one or both speakers.

Aspects include habitual, imperfective, completive, perfect and progressive. Sequential, a subtype of progressive, denotes events that occur in a sequence. There is also a marker for persistive events.

The most common order of affixes on verbs is thus:

Order of Affixes in Gĩkũyũ
| FOC | SUB | NEG | T | OBJ/ REFL | REDUP | STEM | RECIP | INTS | MID/ REVERS | CAUS | APP | TRANS+ CAUS | FV |

A change in the order of suffixes in a verb can also change the meaning, where each suffix acts like a modifier for the previous ones.

Many of the affixes listed are only available to certain verbs. Some of them may change form slightly due to vowel harmony, adding further irregularity to the verbs' structural patterns.

Focus marker, subject agreement particles exist for 1st and 2nd person, the discourse participants,

Gĩkũyũ Person Concord
| | Subject | Object |
|---|---|---|
| 1SG | N- | -N- |
| 1PL | tũ- | -tũ- |
| 2SG | ũ- | -kũ/gũ- |
| 2PL | mũ- | -mu- |

Third person concord is not listed since that falls under the noun class agreement described earlier.

N is a flexible morpheme that causes the appearance of a nasal consonant depending on its environment:

Non-verb specific interactions with consonants include:

/Nβ/, / → [ᵐb]
/Nt/, /Nɾ/ → [ⁿd]
/Nk/ → [ᵑg]
/Nʃ/ → [ⁿʤ]
/Nð/ → [∅ð]
/Nɣ/ → [ŋ] or [ᵑg]
/Nj/ → [ɲ]

Interactions with vowels may often be unstable.

The appearance of N with relation to the initial vowels on verbs occasionally causes an unpredictable consonant to be realized:

| | N+a | N+ɛ | N+e | N+i | N+ɔ | N+o | N+u |
|---|---|---|---|---|---|---|---|
| ɲV | | ɲɛ [ɲɛ̀ⁿdà] 'i love' | | ɲi [ɲìmá] 'i withhold' | ɲɔ [ɲɔ̀ᵑgíðià] 'i (make) suckle' | | ɲu [ɲùmá] 'i leave' |
| ⁿʤV | ⁿʤa [ⁿʤàɣá] 'i lack' | ⁿʤɛ [ⁿʤɛtɛɾɛɾa] 'i wait' | ⁿʤe [ⁿʤètáɣwɔ̀] 'i am called' | ⁿʤi [ⁿʤìkià] 'i throw' | | ⁿʤo [ⁿʤòká] 'i come' | ⁿʤu [ⁿʤùɣá] 'i say' |
| ⁿdV | ⁿda* [ⁿdáɾómwɔ́] 'i've been bitten' | | | | | | |

The subject agreement is otherwise based on noun class. A verb can exhibit noun class agreement for all arguments, but agrees less commonly with non-human nouns.

In addition to active and passive voices, there is a middle voice with an intermediate connotation.

== Sample phrases ==
| English | Gĩkũyũ |
|---|---|
| How are you | Ũhoro waku or kũhana atĩa? |
| Give me water | He maaĩ |
| How are you doing? | Ũrĩ mwega? or Wĩ mwega |
| I am hungry | Ndĩ mũhũtu |
| Help me | Ndeithie |
| I am good | Ndĩ mwega |
| Are you a friend? | Wĩ mũrata? |
| Bye, be blessed | Tigwo na wega/Tigwo na thaayũ |
| I love you | Nĩngwendete. |
| Come here | Ũka haha |
| I will phone you | Nĩngũkũhũrĩra thimũ |
| I give thanks | Nĩndacokia ngatho |
| I'm blessed | Ndĩ mũrathime |
| Give me money | He mbeca / He mbia |
| Stop nonsense | Tiga wana / tiga ũrimũ |
| Don't laugh | Ndũgatheke |
| You are learned | Wĩ mũthomu |
| Thank you | Thengiũ / Nĩ wega / Nĩ ngaatho |
| Go in peace | Thiĩ na thaayũ |
| Day | Mũthenya |
| Night | Ũtukũ |
| God | Ngai |
| Ancestral Spirits | Ngomi / Ngoma |
| Country/state/Nation | Bũrũri |

== Sample text ==
| English | Kikuyu |
|---|---|
| The Gikuyu believe in God the creator of heaven and earth, the giver of all things. | Gĩkũyũ nĩ gĩtĩkĩtie Ngai mumbi wa Igũrũ na Thĩ na mũheani wa indo ciothe |
| Letter from the Hen to the Eagle | Marũa Ma Ngũkũ Kũrĩ Rwĩgĩ |

== Literature ==
There is notable literature written in the Kikuyu language. For instance, Ngũgĩ wa Thiong'o's Mũrogi wa Kagogo (Wizard of the Crow) is the longest known book written in Kikuyu. Other authors writing in Kikuyu are Gatua wa Mbũgwa and Waithĩra wa Mbuthia. Mbuthia has published various works in different genres—essays, poetry, children stories and translations—in Kikuyu. The late Wahome Mutahi also sometimes wrote in Kikuyu. Also, Gakaara wa Wanjaũ wrote his popular book, Mau Mau Author in Detention, which won a Noma Award in 1984.

== In popular culture ==
In the 1983 movie Star Wars Episode VI: Return of the Jedi, the character Nien Nunb speaks in the Kikuyu language.

The 2023 song Mwaki by Brazilian DJ Zerb features a Kenyan artist, Sofiya Nzau, singing in Kikuyu.

== Bibliography ==
- Armstrong, Lilias E. 1967. The Phonetic and Tonal Structure of Kikuyu. London: Published for the International African Institute by Dawsons of Pall Mall.
- Barlow, A. Ruffell and T. G. Benson. 1975. English-Kikuyu Dictionary. Oxford: Clarendon Press.
- Barlow, A. Ruffell. 1951. Studies in Kikuyu Grammar and Idiom. Edinburgh: William Blackwood & Sons,
- Benson, T. G. 1964. Kikuyu–English Dictionary. Oxford: Clarendon Press.
- Gecaga B. M. and Kirkaldy-Willis W.H. 1953. English–Kikuyu, Kikuyu–English Vocabulary. Nairobi: The Eagle Press.
- Kihara, Claudius P. "Middle and Antipassive Voices in Gĩkũyũ (E51)." Arusha Working Papers in African Linguistics, 6(1): 17–39.
- Leakey L. S. B. 1989. First Lessons in Kikuyu. Nairobi: Kenya Literature Bureau.
- Mugane John 1997. A Paradigmatic Grammar of Gikuyu. Stanford, California: CSLI publications.
