= Gorowa people =

Ethnic group from Dodoma Region of Tanzania

Total population
- 117,000

Regions with significant populations
- Tanzania Dodoma Region & Manyara Region

Languages
- Gorowa

Religion
- Christianism, Animism

Related ethnic groups
- Iraqw

The Gorowa, also known as Fyomi are a Cushitic ethnic group and Iraqw community inhabiting the Manyara and Dodoma regions in Tanzania. They speak the Gorowa language as a mother tongue, which belongs to the South Cushitic branch of the Afro-Asiatic family. Estimating the Gorowa population is difficult, as ethnic affiliation or language is not recorded in the national census. The number of Gorowa speakers is estimated to be 132,748, though it is important to recognize that some Gorowa people may not speak the language, so this number will not correspond exactly to the population.

== Early history ==
=== Identification and location ===
The Gorowa have been in their present location for approximately 250–300 years (about 10 generations).

=== Demography ===
The population of the Gorowa at the turn of the previous century was estimated to be between 3000 and 8000 people.

== Daily life and culture ==
Traditional Gorowa belief systems see the natural world as sacred, and a suite of indigenous land management practices, inspired by myth, have developed around this view. Gorowa rituals and social gatherings often take place in forests and sacred groves carefully preserved for these purposes, that large trees (especially ficus) are protected as dwellings of rain-bringing sprits, and various unsustainable land use practices were prohibited.
