= South Cushitic languages =

Branch of the Cushitic languages of Tanzania

South Cushitic
- Rift, Greater Rift
- Geographic distribution: Tanzania
- Linguistic classification: Afro-Asiatic: Cushitic; South Cushitic
- Subdivisions: Rift; Taita Cushitic †

Language codes
- Glottolog: sout3054

The South Cushitic or Rift languages of Tanzania are a branch of the Cushitic languages. The most numerous is Iraqw, with 600,000 speakers. Scholars believe that these languages were spoken by Southern Cushitic agro-pastoralists from Ethiopia, who began migrating southward into the Great Rift Valley in the third millennium BC.

== History ==
The original homeland of Proto-South-Cushitic was in southwestern Ethiopia. South Cushitic speakers then migrated south to Lake Turkana in northern Kenya by 3000 BC and further south, entering northern Tanzania in 2000 BC. The speakers of South Cushitic were likely the first peoples to introduce agriculture and pastoralism in the lands east of Lake Victoria. Being the only agriculturalists and pastoralists, they faced no competition and spread rapidly throughout southern East Africa.

As the speakers of South Cushitic rapidly spread throughout Kenya and Tanzania, they encountered hunter-gatherer peoples who preceded them and whom they assimilated and were influenced by (as seen by the loanwords of hunter-gatherer origin found in the South Cushitic languages).

The hunter-gatherers who preceded the Southern Cushites in East Africa were not without effect on their successors. The proto-Southern Cushitic community itself must have consisted in large part of descendants of hunter-gatherers who had been assimilated culturally and linguistically by the immigrant agriculturists. And some hunter-gatherers who later adopted Southern Cushitic languages as their own nevertheless maintained their old ways and remained food-gatherers in economy. The Dahalo, Southern Cushitic-speakers of eastern Kenya, are often still today hunters, as are also the Aramanik of Masailand.

There was a now extinct sister branch to South Cushitic called "Para-Southern Cushitic". The Para-Southern Cushitic languages were once spoken in the Eastern Equatoria region of South Sudan and the Karamoja region of northeastern Uganda before being absorbed by Kuliak, Nilotic and Surmic speakers.

== Classification ==
The Rift languages are named after the Great Rift Valley of Tanzania, where they are found.

Hetzron (1980:70ff) suggested that the Rift languages (South Cushitic) are a part of Lowland East Cushitic. Kießling & Mous (2003) have proposed more specifically that they be linked to a Southern Lowland branch, together with Oromo, Somali, and Yaaku–Dullay. It is possible that the great lexical divergence of Rift from East Cushitic is due to Rift being partially influenced through contact with Khoisan languages, as perhaps evidenced by the unusually high frequency of the ejective affricates /tsʼ/ and /tɬʼ/, which outnumber pulmonary consonants like /p, f, w, ɬ, x/. Kießling & Mous suggest that these ejectives may be remnants of clicks from the source language. Some few loanwords from sources akin to Sandawe and Hadza are known that demonstrate this form of click loss:

- Dental click → sibilant affricate: Sandawe /ǀiŋ/ 'snake'; — Alagwa /tsʼiima/, Burunge /tʃʼiima/ 'python', Kwʼadza /tsʼeema/
- Lateral click → lateral affricate: Sandawe /ǁʼani/ 'bow', Hadza /ǁʼana/ 'poisoned arrow'; — Iraqw /tɬʼaŋ/ 'quiver of arrows', Kwʼadza /tɬʼaniko/ 'arrows (plural)'

Ehret proposes also a further source for the copious /tsʼ/ of West Rift: unconditional ejectivization of all other proto-Rift affricates such as *dz, *ts, *tʃ, which would have remained partly distinct in Kwʼadza and Aasax, e.g. Proto-Rift *dziʔa 'chick' > Iraqw /tsʼiʔamo/, Kwʼadza /dziʔako/.

The terms "South Cushitic" and "Rift" are not quite synonymous: The Ma'a and Dahalo languages were once included in South Cushitic, but were not considered Rift. Kießling restricts South Cushitic to West Rift as its only indisputable branch. He states that Dahalo has too many East Cushitic features to belong to South Cushitic, as does Ma'a. (The Waata and Degere may once have spoken languages similar to Dahalo.) He deems Kw'adza and Aasax in turn insufficiently described to classify as even Cushitic with any certainty. Kruijsdijk (2024) argues for continuing to maintain Kw'adza and Aasax as Rift languages, but finds Ehret's East Rift hypothesis insufficiently supported, and that structurally Kw'adza is instead closer to the West Rift languages.

- Rift
  - Greater West Rift
    - West Rift
      - North
        - Iraqwoid
          - Gorowa
          - Iraqw
        - Alagwa
      - South
        Burunge
    - Kw'adza (extinct)
  - Aasáx (extinct)

Iraqw and Gorowa are close enough for basic mutual intelligibility. Alagwa has become similar to Burunge through intense contact, and so had previously been classified as a Southern West Rift language. Aasax and Kw'adza are poorly attested and, like Dahalo, maybe the result language shift from non-Cushitic languages.

Several additional and now extinct South Cushitic languages are deduced from their influence on the Bantu languages that replaced them. Two of these, Taita Cushitic, appear to have been more distinct from the current Rift languages than other related languages. They are similar to an earlier form of Rift, which Nurse (1988) calls "Greater Rift".

There was a now-extinct member of the West Rift branch of South Cushitic that Christopher Ehret named "Tale" (pronounced Tah-lay), and Derek Nurse called it simply "West Rift southern Cushites." The Tale Southern Cushites originated south of the Grumeti River in the Mara region and then expanded westward across the Mara plain, stretching their territory across north-central Tanzania (avoiding the lowlands of the southern and western lakeshore and making use of ecological zones suitable for their pastoralism south of Lake Victoria) and then expanded north into the Kagera Region, following both banks of the Kagera river until the southern side of the Kagera River became their northern boundary. Tale southern Cushitic territory also stretched north into the western and central highlands of Kenya (including Mount Elgon and the Kavirondo Gulf). The Tale peoples spoke 7 or more different dialects of their languages.

The Iringa Southern Cushites are another extinct South Cushitic branch that migrated to the northern parts of Tanzania's southern highlands before the first millennium AD. They are named after the Iringa Region of Tanzania.

== Phonology ==
Consonant system of Proto-West-Rift
		Labial	Dental		Palatal / postalveolar	Velar / uvular		Pharyngeal	Glottal
		Labial	Central	Lateral	Palatal / postalveolar	Plain	Labialized	Pharyngeal	Glottal
Stops / Affricates	Voiceless	p	t		tʃ	k	kʷ		ʔ
Stops / Affricates	Voiced	b	d		dʒ	g	gʷ	ʡ	
Stops / Affricates	Ejective		tsʼ	tɬʼ		qʼ	qʷʼ		
Fricatives	Voiceless	f	s	ɬ		x	xʷ	ħ	h
Nasals		m	n		ɲ	[ŋ]	ŋʷ		
Approximants				l	j		w		
Rhotic			r						

*tʃ, *dʒ and *ɲ are rare and occur often in loanwords. *[ŋ] occurs as an allophone of *n before the velar and uvular consonants.

*tsʼ shifts to postalveolar /tʃʼ/ in Burunge, and *ŋʷ becomes zero in Alagwa, /w/ or /ŋ/ in Burunge. Otherwise, the overall structure of this system is roughly preserved in all West Rift languages, though many conditional changes can be reconstructed.

Vowel system of Proto-West-Rift
	Short		Long	
	Front	Back	Front	Back
Close	*i	*u	*ii	*uu
Mid	*e	*o	*ee	*oo
Open	*a		*aa	
