= Rangi language =

Bantu language

Rangi
- Kɨlaangi
- Native to: Tanzania
- Ethnicity: Rangi
- Native speakers: 410,000 (2007)
- Language family: Niger–Congo?: Atlantic–Congo; Volta-Congo; Benue–Congo; Bantoid; Southern Bantoid; Bantu (Zone F); Mbugwe–Rangi; Rangi

Language codes
- ISO 639-3: lag
- Glottolog: lang1320
- Guthrie code: F.33

Rangi or Langi (native name: Kɨlaangi) is a Bantu language spoken by the Rangi people of Kondoa District in the Dodoma Region of Central Tanzania. Whilst the language is known as Rangi in English and Kirangi in the dominant Swahili spoken throughout the African Great Lakes, the self-referent term is Kilaangi.

Estimates at the number of Rangi-speakers range from 270,000 to 410,000 speakers. Rangi is the largest linguistic group in the Babati-Kondoa region.

Two main varieties of Rangi are identified - that spoken in the Rangi Highlands (known in Swahili as Irangi ya Juu) and that of the Lowlands (Irangi ya Chini). Despite differences, these varieties are mutually intelligible. However, some dialectal variation is also found between the varieties spoken in the main town of Kondoa, as well as in the surrounding villages of Bereko, Bukulu, Isabe, Humai, Kwadinu, Kolo, Choka, Gubali, Nkuku, Bicha, Kingale, Kelema, Paranga, Kidoka, Haubi and Mondo.

== Grammar ==
Rangi exhibits the basic head-initial syntax commonly associated with Bantu languages. The languages exhibits a dominant SVO word order, with some variation in word order possible for pragmatic reasons. Also complements is language by adding an -ext at the end of most of all the words.

=== Noun classes ===
In common with many Bantu languages, Rangi employs a system of noun classes. Rangi has 19 noun classes. Classes 1-10 show regular singular-plural distinctions (with odd numbers representing singular forms and even numbers representing the plural forms). Class 12 is used for (singular) diminutive nouns, class 15 contains infinitival nouns, classes 16 and 17 contain locative nouns, whilst class 19 contains plural diminutives nouns.

- Classes 1/2 contain human nouns: kinship terms, professions, ethnicities, nationalities etc.
- Class 3/4 contain natural phenomena, trees and plants, body parts which exhibit a part-whole relationship.
- Classes 5/6 contain nouns which host the prefix i- or ri-.
- Classes 7/8 contain nouns which denote inanimate objects including tools.
- Classes 9/10 contain nouns denoting a wide range of entities. The nouns in these classes contain prefixes that consist of an underspecified nasal which assimilates to the place of articulation.
- Class 11 has been reconstructed to contain nouns which are long in shape. In Rangi, nouns that cover an extensive area, or have an extensive reach are also included in this class.
- Class 12 contains nouns which convey diminutive meanings. In some instances the diminutive prefix ka- appears alongside the 'original' noun class prefix, whilst in other instances the diminutive prefix replaces the noun class prefix.
- Class 14 contains non-count nouns and abstract nouns that do not have a plural counterpart. The nouns of class 14 which do have plural counterparts are found in either class 6 or class 10.

=== Verb-auxiliary order ===
Rangi has come to the attention of linguists due to a number of features it exhibits which are unusual for Bantu languages. Included in this is the verb-auxiliary ordering found in two tenses in the languages. In the immediate future and general future tense, the auxiliary appears after the verb in declarative main clauses. This order is unusual from a comparative and typological perspective, since East African Bantu languages exhibit predominantly auxiliary-verb order and SVO languages are expected to exhibit auxiliary-verb order. This unusual word order is also found in the neighbouring Mbugwe language, spoken in the Babati region.

== Phonology ==
Rangi has a seven-vowel system, with a single low vowel and phonemically contrasting front-back pairs at three heights. The vowels are [a], [ɛ], [i], [ɪ], [ɔ], [u] and [ʊ]. Rangi has phonemic vowel length alternation with a distinction attested between long and short vowels. Rangi also exhibits asymmetric vowel height harmony.

=== Consonants ===
		Labial	Alveolar	Post-alv./ Palatal	Velar	Glottal
Nasal		m	n	ɲ	ŋ	
Plosive/ Affricate	voiceless	p	t	t͡ʃ	k	(ʔ)
Plosive/ Affricate	voiced	b	d	d͡ʒ	ɡ	
Plosive/ Affricate	prenasal vl.	ᵐp	ⁿt	ᶮt͡ʃ	ᵑk	
Plosive/ Affricate	prenasal vd.	ᵐb	ⁿd	ᶮd͡ʒ	ᵑɡ	
Fricative	voiceless	f	s			h
Fricative	voiced	v	z			
Rhotic			r			
Approximant			l	j	w	

- [ʔ] can be heard in word-initial positions before a vowel.
- /s/ can be heard as [ʃ] in palatal environments.
- The sequence /uj/ may be heard as a labial-palatal semivowel [ɥ].

=== Vowels ===
	Front	Central	Back
Close	i iː		u uː
Near-close	ɪ ɪː		ʊ ʊː
Open-mid	ɛ ɛː		ɔ ɔː
Open		a aː	

- /ɛ, ɔ/ can also be heard as more close [e, o] when preceded by a back consonant.
- /a/ can also be heard as back [ɑ] when preceded by a back consonant.

There is little distinction between /l/ and /ɾ/, but the two are not quite in complementary distribution. For instance, /ɾ/ is usually found before /i/, but there is a single attested word with /l/ before /i/, and so they are judged to be distinct phonemes. The name is usually pronounced with an R, but the endonym is an L:

Pendant longtemps j'ai cru que la langue que j'étudiais s'appelait le kɪrangi, car lorsque les locuteurs parlent en anglais, ou à un étranger de manière générale, ils se servent de la forme swahili. Ce n'est que lorsqu'ils parlent en langi qu'ils appellent leur langue kɪlangi.
(For a long time I thought that the language which I was studying was called Kɪrangi, because when speakers spoke in English, or in general to a foreigner, they made do with the Swahili form. It's only when they speak in Langi that they call their language Kɪlangi.)

== Orthography ==
Rangi is written in the Latin alphabet with the addition of the letters ɨ and ʉ, as well as the letter combinations ch, ng', ny, and sh:

Letter	IPA
a	[a]
b	[b]
ch	[tɕ]
d	[d̪]
e	[ɛ]
f	[f]
g	[g]
h	[ɦ]
i	[i]
ɨ	[ɪ]
j	[dʑ]
k	[k]
l	[l]
m	[m]
n	[n̪]
ng'	[ŋ]
ny	[ɲ]
o	[ɔ]
p	[p]
r	[ɾ]
s	[s]
sh	[ɕ]
t	[t̪]
u	[u]
ʉ	[ʊ]
v	[v]
w	[w]
y	[j]
z	[z]
