= Gorowa language =

Cushitic language spoken in Tanzania

Gorowa
- Gorwaa
- Native to: Tanzania
- Region: Dodoma, Manyara
- Ethnicity: Gorowa
- Native speakers: 110,000 (2009)
- Language family: Afro-Asiatic: Cushitic; South; Rift; West Rift; NW Rift; Iraqwoid; Gorowa

Language codes
- ISO 639-3: gow
- Glottolog: goro1270

Gorowa is a Cushitic language spoken in Tanzania in the Dodoma and Manyara Regions.

It is also known as Fiome, Goroa, Gorwaa, Kimbulu, Ufiomi.

As of 2014, an estimated 79,000 people (approx. 60% of the ethnic population) use this language on a daily basis. Older Gorwaa speakers in rural areas tend to be enthusiastic about their language and have contributed to a large body of data including songs, traditional stories, uncommon vocabulary, etc. Younger Gorwaa in urban areas view the language as less useful and may be reticent to speak it. Some use the exonym Mbulu (from a large Iraqw settlement) and say they speak Kimbulu; however, this is still the Gorwaa language. Codeswitching with Swahili is ubiquitous. Young speakers involved in documentation of Gorwaa have become researchers and assumed ownership of the project.

Instances of Gorwaa writing are rare, and show a great variety of non-standard spellings. It is common to use the orthography of Iraqw for Gorwaa written communication.

== See also ==
- Gorowa people
