= Alagwa language =

Cushitic language spoken in Tanzania

Alagwa
- Alagwaisa
- Native to: Tanzania
- Region: Dodoma
- Ethnicity: Alagwa
- Native speakers: 53,000 (2009)
- Language family: Afro-Asiatic: Cushitic; South; Rift; West; North; Alagwa
- Writing system: Latin

Language codes
- ISO 639-3: wbj
- Glottolog: alag1248
- ELP: Alagwa

Alagwa (Alaagwa’isa) is a Cushitic language spoken in Tanzania in the Dodoma region. Some Alagwa have shifted to other languages such as Sandawe.

== Phonology ==
=== Consonants ===
		Labial	Alveolar		Palatal	Velar		Uvular		Pharyngeal	Glottal
		Labial	plain	lateral	Palatal	plain	lab.	plain	lab.	Pharyngeal	Glottal
Plosive	voiceless	p	t		(c)	k	kʷ	q	qʷ		ʔ
Plosive	voiced	b	d		(ɟ)	ɡ	ɡʷ				
Affricate			tsʼ	tɬʼ							
Fricative	voiceless	f	s	ɬ		x	xʷ			ħ	h
Fricative	voiced									ʕ	
Nasal		m	n		(ɲ)	ŋ					
Trill			r								
Approximant				l	j		w				

- Sounds /c, ɟ, ɲ/ are considered rare, or mainly occur from loanwords.

=== Vowels ===
Alagwa has five vowels /a, e, i, o, u/. The five vowels have contrastive long counterparts.

=== Tone ===
There are two tone levels in Alagwa: low and high tone e.g., darimbáa "grass". Tone has grammatical function and limited lexical function. However, it cannot be described as a tone language because some words have only one tone (despite the number of the syllables) and the majority have none.

Mainly, there are two intonation types: concluding intonation and non-concluding.

== Grammar ==
=== Word order ===
Alagwa sentences have a generalized order [Subject X Auxiliary Y Verb Z], and elements of the sentence other than the subject appear in the positions labelled X, Y, and Z, depending on their information status in the clause. New material tends to appear in the post-verbal position, Z, while old information appears in the pre-auxiliary position, X.

The following example (Kiessling 2007:138) shows the noun yaawáa 'dowry' introduced as new information after the verb in the first sentence and repeated as old information before the auxiliary ningi in the second sentence.

makimoo-w-ód, ning-aa xay-ee’ ningi bu’-i-yee’ yaawáa
guy-M-D SEQ:S3-ABL come:3-PF.PL SEQ:S3 pay-3-PF.PL dowry
'that guy, they [i.e. the lions] came and paid the dowry.'

maa dende’ee-w-ós yaawáa ningi bu’-i-yee’
so folks-N-3SG.POSS dowry SEQ:O3PL pay-3-PF.PL
'His folks paid the dowry.'

== Bibliography ==
- Kiesling, Roland. 2007. Alagwa functional sentence perspective and "incorporation". Omotic and Cushitic Language Studies. Papers from the Fourth Cushitic Omotic Conference, Leiden, 10–12 April 2003. Edited by Azeb Amha, Maarten Mous, Graziano Savà. Rüdiger Köppe Verlag. ISBN 978-3-89645-482-9.
- Maghway, Josephat B. 2008. Alaagwa'isa Phonology. In Occasional papers in linguistics (OPiL), Vol. 3, 82–96
- Mous, Maarten. 2001. Alagwa basic syntax. In New data and new methods in Afroasiatic linguistics. Zaborski, Andrzej (ed.), 125–135. Wiesbaden: Otto Harrassowitz.
