= Northeast Bantu languages =

Group of languages

Northeast Bantu
- Northeast Savanna Bantu
- Geographic distribution: Tanzania, Kenya, Uganda, Rwanda, Burundi, the DRC and Mozambique.
- Linguistic classification: Niger–Congo?: Atlantic–Congo; Volta-Congo; Benue–Congo; Bantoid; Southern Bantoid; Bantu; Northeast Bantu
- Proto-language: Proto-Northeast Bantu

Language codes
- Glottolog: nort3203 nyat1247 Nyaturu–Nilamba

The Northeast Bantu languages are a group of Bantu languages spoken in East Africa. In Guthrie's geographic classification, they fall within Bantu zones E50 plus E46 (Sonjo), E60 plus E74a (Taita), F21–22, J, G60, plus Northeast Coast Bantu (of zones E & G). Some of these languages (F21, most of E50, and some of J) share a phonological innovation called Dahl's law that is unlikely to be borrowed as a productive process, though individual words reflecting Dahl's law have been borrowed into neighboring languages.

The languages, or clusters, are:

- Northeast Bantu languages
  - Kikuyu–Kamba a.k.a. Thagiicu (primarily E50):
    - Sonjo (E40)
    - Kamba (Daisu)
    - Meru (Cuka) (incl. Tharaka, Mwimbi-Muthambi)
    - Gikuyu, Embu
  - Chaga–Taita
    - Taita (Dawida; E70) – Sagalla
    - Chaga languages (E60)
  - Northeast Coast Bantu (G10-G40): Swahili (E70), etc.
  - Takama: Sukuma–Nyamwezi (+ Konongo–Ruwila), Kimbu (F20), Iramba–Isanzu, Nyaturu (Rimi) (F30), ?Holoholo–Tumbwe–Lumbwe (D20)
  - Great Lakes Bantu (zone J):Luhya, Gusii, Kuria, Suba, Zanaki, Ikoma, Samia, Marachi, Khayo, Rwanda-Rundi, Ganda, Rutara languages, Bangubangu etc.
  - Bena–Kinga (G60)
    - Sangu
    - Hehe
    - Bena
    - Pangwa
    - Kinga–Magoma
    - Wanji
    - Kisi
    - ?Manda (N10)
