= Arbore people =

Ethiopian ethnic group

Arbore
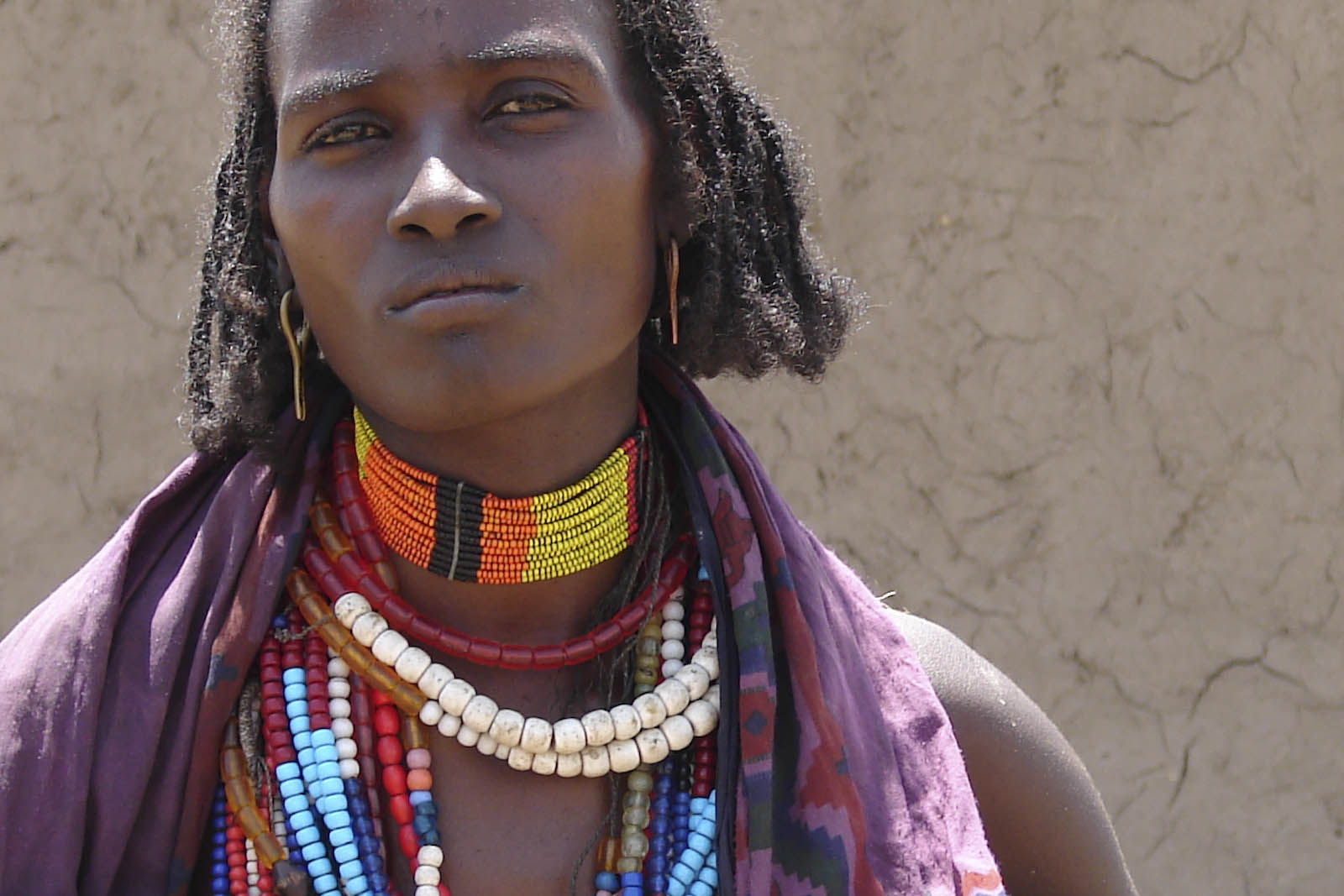
- An Arbore woman

Total population
- 6,850

Regions with significant populations
- Ethiopia

Languages
- Arbore

Religion
- Traditional African religions

Related ethnic groups
- Nilotic peoples, (Note: The Arbore along with the Daasanach form a branch with the Nyangatom (Teso-Turkanic) and the Karo (South Omotic) on the cladogram (a diagram used in cladistics) showing affinities between a wide sample of Ethiopian populations. See Supplementary Materials of López et al (2021), page 49."Evidence of the interplay of genetics and culture in Ethiopia".) Aroid (South Omotic) peoples such as the Karo, and Cushitic peoples (primarily of the Western Omo–Tana branch)

The Arbore are an ethnic group living in southern Ethiopia, near Lake Chew Bahir. The Arbore people are pastoralists. With a total population of 6,850, the Abore population is divided into four villages, named: Gandareb, Kulaama, Murale, and Eegude.

== Language ==
The Arbore language is classified as a member of the Omo-Tana group within Lowland East Cushitic, together with Daasanach, Elmolo, Bayso, Rendille, Boni and the various Somali dialects. Its grammar exemplifies many typical features of Lowland East Cushitic as well as some specific innovations. Of historical interest is the language's preservation of at least a dozen verbs of the Afroasiatic "Prefix Conjugation".

== Genetics ==
A 2021 study comparing a variety of Ethiopian populations discovered that the Arbore people along with the linguistically closely related Daasanach people cluster closer to the Nilotic Nyangatom and the South Omotic Karo people than they do to most other Cushitic populations of Ethiopia.

== Ethnography ==
The people who also call themselves the Hor (Hoor) live in four villages in the delta of the Limo River (also known as Dullay or Weito) at the northern end of Lake Stephanie (Bau or Chew Bahr) in South Omo Zone. The name Arbore is used by the inhabitants of two of the four villages, Gandaraba and Kulama, whereas the inhabitants of Eegude and Murale refer to themselves as Marle, Arbore being the term traditionally employed by anthropologists and by the Ethiopian government.

The Arbore practice pastoralism, sorghum cultivation, seasonal fishing and hunting and engage in a wide regional network of bond friendship for the exchange of gifts. In 1996 their population numbered 3,840. Their economy of subsistence depends largely on the periodical floods of the river.

The age organization controls cattle, pasture and water. It distributes cultivable land after floods and guarantees law and order in the territory of the Arbore. Each generation class (herr) comes to power after an initiation which is held once in about 40 years in rituals known as ner and chirnan. Each generation class consists of four age classes (jim). The group containing the young people waiting to be initiated into a jim is called morqo. The same term is used for the four age classes organized and named, but waiting to form a generation class by undergoing initiation at the close of the 40 years.

The Garle and Olmoque clans, who are senior and junior, jointly lead the political and ritual life of the Arbore and their neighbors, and the leaders of the age organization survey the smooth running of daily life among the Arbore. The political chief is usually called kyrnat, the ritual qawot, even though it does not imply that political and religious life and functions are strictly separated. Both the Arbore and their neighbors enter the sacred cattle-gates of qawots (ritual chiefs) with gifts of heifers, bulls, honey, coffee, tobacco and herbs to receive blessings for human, animal and crop fertility, for rain and for victory against their enemies.

== See also ==
- El Molo people
- Daasanach people
- Western Omo–Tana languages
