= Arbore language =

Afro-Asiatic language of Ethiopia

Arbore
- Arbora
- Native to: Ethiopia
- Region: extreme southwest, Omo region
- Ethnicity: Arbore
- Native speakers: 7,200 (2007)
- Language family: Afro-Asiatic: Cushitic; East; Lowland East; Western Omo–Tana; Arbore

Language codes
- ISO 639-3: arv
- Glottolog: arbo1245
- ELP: Arbore

Arbore is an Afro-Asiatic language spoken by the Arbore people in southern Ethiopia in a few settlements of Hamer woreda near Lake Chew Bahir.

== Classification ==
That the Arbore language belongs within a "Macro-Somali" (now called Omo-Tana) group was first recognized by Sasse (1974). Other members of this group are Daasanach, Bayso, Rendille, Boni and the various Somali dialects. Omo-Tana itself is a major division of Lowland East Cushitic. Arbore's nearest relatives (jointly classified as Western Omo-Tana) are Daasanach and especially the probably extinct Kenyan language of the Elmolo fishermen of Lake Turkana. The sub-grouping is justified in terms of uniquely shared lexicon and certain common grammatical innovations, amongst which the generalizations of the absolute forms of the 1st person singular and 2nd person singular personal pronouns to subject function, thereby replacing the earlier Proto-Lowland East Cushitic forms, e.g. 2nd personal pronouns, e.g., 2nd person singular *ati/u 'thou': *ki/u 'thee', but Arbore ke 'thou' and 'thee'.

== Phonology ==
The phonology of Arbore was described by Hayward (1984). He lists the following phonemes:

=== Consonants ===
		Labial	Alveolar	Palatal	Velar	Glottal
Nasal		m	n	ɲ	ŋ	
Plosive	Voiceless	p (Note: The two phonemes /p/ and /tʼ/ are described as rare and mostly occurring in loan words.)	t	c	k	ʔ
Plosive	Voiced	b	d	ɟ	g	
Plosive	Ejective		tʼ	cʼ	kʼ	
Plosive	Implosive	ɓ	ɗ			
Fricative		f	s	ʃ (Note: The phoneme /ʃ/ is also rare, and there may be a free variation with /s/.)		h
Liquid	Lateral		l			
Liquid	Trill		r			
Glide		w		j		

All consonant phonemes except /h, ʃ, ŋ, p, ʔ/ can be geminated.

=== Vowels ===
	Front	Back
Close	i	u
Close-mid	e	o
Open	a	

=== Syllable structure ===
In Arbore, no word begins or ends with more than one consonantal segment. Moreover, no word contains a sequence of more than two consonantal segments internally.

=== Changes of sounds in certain phonological and morphological environments ===
There are instances in which sounds differ from their usual pronunciation. The differences follow certain patterns and these patterns are:

- Degemination: when a consonantal segment or word-boundary follows a geminate, the geminate will be degeminated.
- Regressive assimilation of stops: non-glottal, oral stops are fully assimilated by following oral or nasal stops. This rule does not appear to be obligatory.
- Glottal reduction I : preceding a non-identical consonant, glottalized stops are reduced to glottal stops. In the case of the letter b, this rule is only obligatory when there is a preceding m.
- Glottal reduction II: when preceded by a non-syllabic sonorant, d and b are reduced to a glottal stop in the end of a word.
- Sibilant gliding I: the voiceless sibilants are weakened to a palatal glide if they follow a consonantal segment. This rule is optional in the case of s.
- Sibilant gliding II: č weakens to a palatal glide in the end of a word.
- Lateralization: non-glottalized, non-sibilant, oral coronal stops (ie. t, d) are totally assimilated if followed by a lateral.
- Oralization: the laryngeal h is fully assimilated by any preceding non-laryngeal single non-syllabic segment within a word
- H-elision: when preceded by another laryngeal, h is elided
- Coronal assimilation of m: optionally m undergoes assimilation to the place of articulation of a following t or l
- Glide deletion: y or w are left out when preceded by a and followed by a palatal vowel
- L-syllabicization: when preceded by i and followed by a consonant y optionally undergoes syllabicization to i
- Final devoicing: word-finally voiced obstruents undergo devoicing and utterance-finally stops are generally unreleased
- Lateral spirantization: the lateral l is articulated like a fricative before a sibilant
- Alveolopalatalization: s acquires an alveolopalatal articulation after a liquid, rule is optional with r but fully obligatory in the case of l
- Post-lateral glottal reduction: d is reduced to a glottal stop if it is followed by l. This pattern is optional.
- Post-laryngeal epenthesis: a epenthetic copy of a single vowel immediately preceding a laryngeal is inserted between the latter and any following non-glottalized obstruent or nasal
- Post-laryngeal metathesis: the second vowel mora of a long vowel and an immediately following laryngeal are transposed when the latter is followed by an obstruent or nasal. This is an optional but usual pattern.
- Pre-h contraction: a long vowel contracts by one mora before h word-finally
- Translaryngeal vowel harmony I : a low vowel (a) is raised and fronted [e] when it is separated from a preceding vowel e only by a laryngeal
- Translaryngeal vowel harmony II: a mid-front vowel is backed and rounded when it is separated from a following o only by a laryngeal
- Translaryngeal vowel harmony III: a mid-front vowel is raised to i when it is separated from a following i only by a laryngeal; sporadically the same process seems to affect the low vowel a
- Murmur: an intervocalic h is uttered with murmur (breathy phonation)
- Laryngeal feature spreading: when vowels both precede and follow h or ? they acquire murmur or glottalization/creaky voice respectively
- Transglottal glide copying: when a glottal stop follows a glide, and the sequence is intervocalic, a replica of the glide is inserted after the glottal stop
- Progressive lateral assimilation: following l an n is assimilated fully
- I-epenthesis: an epethentic [i] is inserted at the juncture of a cluster of dissimilar consonants with another (third) consonant or word boundary
- Archisegmental nasal realization I: the archisegmental nasal will acquire the place of articulation features of any following non-liquid non-syllabic
- Archisegmental nasal realization II: the archisegmental nasal assimilates totally to a following liquid
- Lateral spirantization: the lateral phoneme l acquires a fricative articulation before s
- Alveolopalatalization: s acquires an alveolpalatal articulation after a liquid, rule is optional after r
- Crasis: processes that occur across a certain type of word boundary: first words ends in a vowel, second word begins with a glottal stop
  - Glottal stop deletion: initial glottal stop optional deletes following a word ending in a vowel
  - High tone spreading: when two vowels fuse or diphthongize, if either of them carries a High tone, this spreads throughout both moras of the resulting long vowel or diphthong
  - Vowel fusion: when identical vowels occur either side of a word boundary, and there is no intervening glottal stop, they fuse as one long vowel
  - Vowel assimilation: when two non-identical vowels occur either side of a word boundary

== Grammar ==
Arbore well exemplifies a number of typical Lowland East Cushitic features such as: a three-term number system (basic unit: singulative: plural) in nouns, within which "polarity" figures, i.e., gender alternations across the various number forms of a lexeme; a morphosyntax thoroughly deployed in distinguishing topic and contrastive focus; great morphophonological complexity in its verbal derivation and inflection. Of historical interest is the language's preservation of at least a dozen verbs of the archaic "Prefix Conjugation", often attributed to Proto-Afroasiatic itself.

=== Morphology ===
==== Pluralizing nouns ====
There are several patterns for the way the plural of nouns can be formed. Which pattern is used depends on morphological, lexical and phonological categories. For consonant-final, masculine nouns, -mé is suffixed. Half of these forms are sr forms ending in -n, - č or -t. However, simple ur forms and feminine forms also possible in this pattern. To masculine, consonant-final nouns, -a?ame is added as a suffix in the plural. Additionally, there is a fairly large group of mostly feminine nouns with an h-tone in the end, to which -n is suffixed in the plural. To other feminine nouns with a final consonant, -ó as added a suffix. Plural nouns with a final vowel have -má as a suffix to indicate the plural. There are further patterns of the pluralization of nouns, but these other patterns are only minor.

==== Adjectives ====
Adjectives in Arbore have either a predicative or an attributive function and their form depends on this function. In the predicative function, adjectives only have one form which does not change depending on the gender of the subject noun. In the attributive function they act as a modifier in a noun phrase. In this case, the adjective has two forms: in the non-plural form, -a is added as a suffix, and in the plural form, -o is suffixed. Adjectives also have forms with reduplicated stems, which can be substituted for the single-stem forms when the noun is semantically plural. Otherwise, these adjectives work the same way as single-stem adjectives.

==== Pronouns ====
There are simple forms and suffixed forms of independent subject pronouns, which are summarized in the table below. The simple forms are used in sentences with either one other focussed constituent or in neutral sentences without a focussed constituent. The -he form cannot take the function of an object. The -t form can replace the simple form and can function as subject and object in sentences without focussed constituents. All other forms can stand as nominal predicates.

	Simple form	-he form	-t form	-s(s)e form	-ta form	ø/-he/-t + -lo form
1s	yé	Y[éhe]				y[éhe]lo
2s	ké	K[éhe]				k[éhe]lo
1p	?onó			?onos(s)e		?onolo
2p	?ín			?inse		?inlo
Abs. nom.						
3ms	?us(s)ú ús(s)u		?us(s)út ?ús(s)ut		?us(s)uta	?us(s)u[l:]o
3fs			?es(s)ét ?és(s)et		?es(s)eta	?es(s)u[l:]o
3p			?os(s)ót ?ós(s)ot		?os(s)ota	?os(s)u[l:]o

==== Inflection of verbs based on tense ====
There are different patterns of verb conjugation. These can be divided into two classes: the prefix conjugations and the suffix conjugations.

There are two patterns of prefix conjugation, which is rarer than the suffix conjugation, only applying to 12 verbs in total.

1. Pattern 1: the stem of the verb has two different alternants; one having a stem-vocalism in l, and the other having a stem-vocalism in e. The first alternant occurs in all 1s and all affirmative imperative forms. The second one occurs in all other verb forms.
2. Pattern 2: this pattern has two alternants as well. The first one has a stem-vocalism in a mid-vowel (e or o) and occurs in all negative jussive and imperative forms and the 3p jussive affirmative verb forms. The second one has a stem-vocalism in a and occurs in all other verb forms.

There are the following patterns of suffix conjugation:

1. Subject marker alternants: 2s, 2p, 3fs suffixed subject markers have two alternants each: -t, and -ø. -ø is used for causative 1 extended stem verbs and -t- is used elsewhere.
2. Stem-alternants – causative 1: this pattern involves a threefold alternation in the form of radical extension. There is -i- used for 1p members of perfect affirmative, imperfect affirmative, imperfect negative and jussive affirmative. Additionally, there is -s-, which is used for 1s, 3ms, and 3p members of perfect affirmative, pluperfect affirmative, imperfect affirmative, imperfect negative, and jussive affirmative; all members of the perfect negative, jussive negative and imperative negative, the plural affirmative imperative. Lastly, -is- is used for all other verb forms.
3. Stem alternants – Middle 1 and Middle 2: this pattern exhibits a threefold alternation in the form of radical extension. Due to parallels in shape and distribution, it is treated in sets. The first alternant exhibits a final d and occurs in1s members of perfect affirmative, pluperfect affirmative, imperfect affirmative, imperfect negative and jussive affirmative paradigms, and plural imperative affirmative. The second alternant occurs in 3ms and 3p members of perfect affirmative, pluperfect affirmative and jussive affirmative paradigms; all members of the perfect and jussive negative paradigms except 1s, and in singular and plural imperative negative. This alternant exhibits a final t. The last alternant ends in an -a and is used in all other verb forms.
4. Stem alternants – Middle 3: this pattern has a fourfold alternation in the form of the radical extension. -a- occurs in singular imperative affirmative forms. -d-, however, is used in the 1s members of perfect affirmative, pluperfect affirmative, imperfect affirmative, imperfect negative and jussive affirmative forms, and in plural imperative affirmative forms. -t- occurs in 3ms and 3p members of perfect affirmative, pluperfect affirmative, imperfect affirmative, imperfect negative and jussive affirmative, all the members of the perfect and jussive negative paradigms except 1s, and in singular and plural imperative negative forms. Lastly, -aha- is used elsewhere.
5. Stem alternants – Middle 4: here, two alternants occur. The first one exhibits the suffix -add- which is used for 1s members of perfect affirmative, pluperfect affirmative, imperfect affirmative, imperfect negative and jussive affirmative; plural imperative affirmative. The second one, -at-, is used elsewhere.
6. Stem alternants – Inchoative: this pattern has two alternants as well. There is - ø- which is used for 2s, 2p, 3fs and 1p members of perfect affirmative, pluperfect affirmative, imperfect affirmative and negative; and the 3fs and 1p members of the jussive affirmative forms. For the other forms, -w- is used.
7. Stem alternants – Plural imperative marker alternants: in this pattern, the terminal vowel which marks the plural in the imperative affirmative has an optional alternant, i.e. -e-/-a-, and -a-. The former one is used in all causative and middle extended-stem verbs. The latter one occurs in the other verb forms.

==== Prepositions ====
In Arbore, there are two types of prepositions. The first type has a nominal origin and is homophonous with nouns denoting either locations or body parts. Focussed noun phrases take the phrase-final clitic subject pronoun. Location words, however, appear to be more postpositional in that they occur as heads of genitival constructions, and the clitic-pronoun is attached to them. The second type does not have a nominal counterpart and does not appear in any other syntactic position. Some of these prepositions are bound to a particular verb lexically. ?ár, for example, generally indicates movement towards the speaker when the verb is an intransitive verb of motion, or activity an activity with motion. Additionally, there is ?ug, which generally indicates movement away from the speaker. Ka is the commonest preposition, which can have several meanings depending on the context. It can have an ablative sense with some verbs, and with other verbs a dative or beneficiary meaning. But it can also carry a sense of location in place or time. Lastly, there is kaŋ, which always relates to instrumentality or path.

==== Numerals ====
Numerals in Arbore share many grammatical properties of nouns. They have an inherent gender, even though the phonological shape or tone do not always correlate with their counterparts in nouns. Additionally, semantic plurality is grammatically more important than gender. The numbers 1-10 and one hundred are listed with their gender in the table below.

English	Arbore
one	takká (f), tokkó (m)
two	laamá (p)
three	seezzé (p)
four	ʔafúr (f)
five	čénn (f)
six	ǧih (f)
seven	tuzba (p)
eight	suyé (f)/(p)
nine	saagald (f)
ten	tommon~d (f)
one hundred	dibbá (m)

=== Syntax ===
==== Word order ====
In neutral sentences, the word order is the following: subject (S); preverbal selections (PVS); complements (if necessary); verb (V). Complement phrases can precede the PVS, but a subject noun phrase (NP) can never be used after the PVC. Also in all other types of sentences the verb generally comes last.

In questions, the word order is: S – question word – verb. Arbore has three interrogative pronouns which can be translated with "which" and depend on the gender of the subject: búko for masculine subjects; bítoko for feminines; and toko for plurals. Furthermore, there is the question pronoun bíteh meaning "whose". When asking for an amount, kaakó is used.

==== Possessive clauses ====
In Arbore, the pronominal possessor is attached to the possessed as a suffix. These suffixes have different forms depending on the gender of the noun: -h- is used for masculine and plural nouns and -t- with feminine nouns. The gender suffixes can not stand on their own. The gender suffix -h- occurs with vowel-final nouns and is assimilated in consonant-final nouns. The masculine and plural marker is independent of the spelling of the head noun. Additionally, there are seven possessive definitives that are attached to the head noun as a suffix following the gender marker:

		singular	plural
1st person		-áw	-ánno
2nd person		-áako/ -áakko	-áň
3rd person	M	-ásut/ -ássut	-áso/ -ásso
3rd person	F	-áset/ -ásset	-áso/ -ásso

The possessive definitives are attached to the head noun of a sentence following a suffix with the owner being suffixed to the thing that is being owned.

==== Relative clauses ====
Relative clauses always follow their heads, meaning that the suffixes are gender-sensitive and are always attached to the head noun. The suffixes are: -h- for masculine nouns, and -t- for feminine nouns. Exceptions to this are nouns whose head takes the deictic definitive -lo-. In relative clauses, a preverbal selector as well as a predicate identifying element can never occur together with the relative clause verb. A bound subject pronoun can occur, however.
