= El Molo people =

Ethnic group in Kenya

El Molo
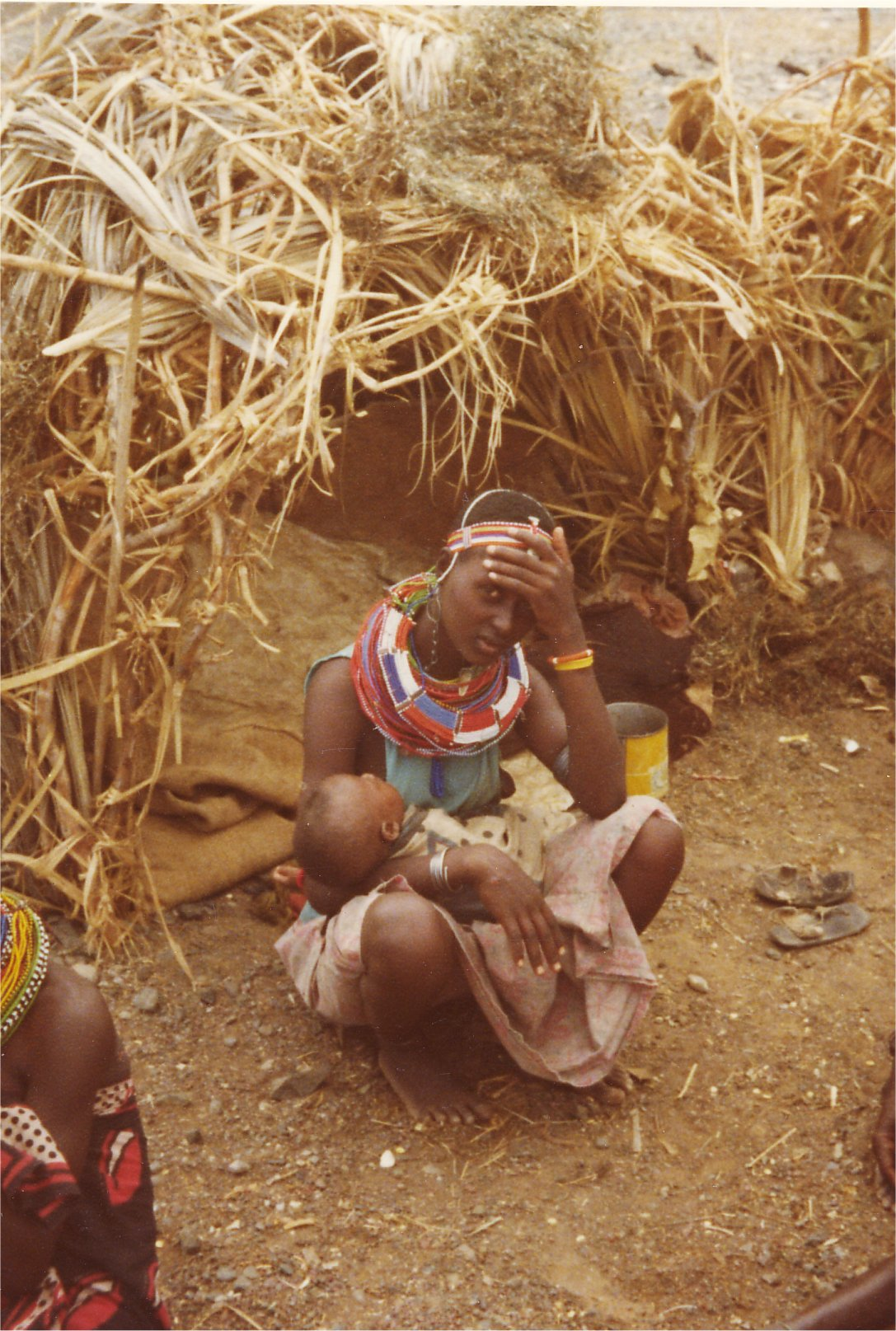
- El Molo woman and baby 1979

Total population
- 1,104

Regions with significant populations

Languages
- El Molo • Samburu • Swahili

Religion
- Waaq, Christianity

Related ethnic groups
- Kenyan Nilotes (in particular the Pokot, Turkana, Samburu and Kalenjin); Daasanach; Arbore; Cushitic peoples (primarily of the Western Omo–Tana branch)

The El Molo, also known as Elmolo, Dehes, Fura-Pawa and Ldes, are an ethnic group mainly inhabiting the northern Eastern Province of Kenya. They historically spoke the El Molo language as a mother tongue, an Afro-Asiatic language of the Cushitic branch; currently, most El Molo speak Samburu.

== History ==
The El Molo are believed to have originally migrated down into the Turkana Basin around 1000 BC from Ethiopia in the more northerly Horn region. Owing to the arid environment in which they entered, they are held to have then abandoned agricultural activities in favor of lakeside fishing.

Historically, the El Molo erected tomb structures in which they placed their dead. A 1962 archaeological survey in the Northern Frontier District led by Susan Brodribb Pughe observed hieroglyphics on a number of these constructions. They were mainly found near springs or wells of water.

== Demographics ==
The El Molo today primarily inhabit the northern Eastern Province of Kenya. They are concentrated in the Marsabit District on the southeast shore of Lake Turkana, between El Molo bay and Mount Kulal. In the past, they also dwelled in other parts of the Northern Frontier District.

According to the 2019 Kenya census, there were 1,104 El Molo residents. However, historians have noted that there are few "pure" El Molo left. Most group members are today admixed with adjacent Nilotic populations, primarily Samburu, with only a handful of unmixed El Molo believed to exist. Many El Molo speakers have also adopted cultural customs from these communities. In 1994, only eight people reportedly could still speak El Molo.

== Language ==
The El Molo historically spoke the El Molo language as a native language. It belongs to the Cushitic branch of the Afro-Asiatic family.

According to Ethnologue, among other sources, the El Molo language is nearly extinct; indeed, there may already be no remaining speakers of the language. Most group members have now adopted the Nilo-Saharan languages of their neighbours.

The El Molo language has no known dialects. It is most similar to Daasanach.

== Religion ==
Many El Molo practice a traditional religion centered on the worship of Waaq/Wakh. In the related Oromo culture, Waaq denotes the single God of the early pre-Abrahamic, monotheistic faith believed to have been adhered to by Cushitic groups.

Some El Molo have also adopted Christianity.

In 2024, the population of the El Molo was recorded as at 300. They are based at the Lake Turkana basin.

== Genetics ==
Recent advances in genetic analyses have helped shed some light on the ethnogenesis of the El Molo people. Genetic genealogy, a novel tool that uses the genes of modern populations to trace their ethnic and geographic origins, has also helped clarify the possible background of the modern El Molo. The El Molo group are characterized by a low haplotype diversity (0.88), close to that observed in Khoisan hunter-gatherers, and by the non-significance of neutrality tests and the multimodal mismatch distribution indicating small population size and strong genetic drift.

=== mtDNA ===
According to an mtDNA study by Castri et al. (2008), the maternal ancestry of the contemporary El Molo consists of a mixture of Afro-Asiatic-associated lineages and Sub-Saharan haplogroups, reflecting substantial female gene flow from neighboring Sub-Saharan populations. A little over 30% of the El Molo belonged to the West Eurasian haplogroups I (23%) and HV1 (8%). The remaining El Molo samples carried various Sub-Saharan macro-haplogroup L sub-clades, mainly consisting of L3* (26%), L0a2 (17%) and L0f (17%).

=== Autosomal DNA ===
The El Molo's autosomal DNA has been examined in a comprehensive study by Tishkoff et al. (2009) on the genetic affiliations of various populations in Africa. According to the researchers, the El Molo showed significant Afro-Asiatic affinities. They also shared some ties with neighboring Nilo-Saharan and Bantu speakers in eastern Africa due to considerable genetic exchanges with these communities over the past 5000 or so years.

== See also ==
- Arbore people
- Daasanach people
- Western Omo–Tana languages
