= Daasanach =

Daasanach may refer to:

- the Daasanach people
- the Daasanach language
