= Aweer =

Aweer may refer to:

- the Aweer people
- the Aweer language
- Al Aweer, a town in Dubai
