= Harold G. Marcus =

American historian of Ethiopia (1936–2003)

- Born: Harold Golden Marcus; April 8, 1936; Worcester, Massachusetts, United States
- Died: January 15, 2003 (aged 66)

Academic background
- Education: Clark University (BA); Boston University (MA, PhD)
- Thesis: Britain and Ethiopia, 1896 to 1914: A Study of Diplomatic Relations (1964)

Academic work
- Discipline: History
- Sub-discipline: African history, Ethiopian studies
- Institutions: Haile Selassie I University; Howard University; Michigan State University
- Main interests: History of Ethiopia, Horn of Africa, African history
- Notable works: The Life and Times of Menelik II (1975); Ethiopia, Great Britain, and the United States, 1941–1974 (1983); Haile Sellassie I: The Formative Years, 1892–1936 (1987); A History of Ethiopia (1994)

Harold Golden Marcus (April 8, 1936 – January 15, 2003) was an American historian and Africanist specializing in the history of Ethiopia and the Horn of Africa. He taught at Haile Selassie I University and Howard University before joining Michigan State University (MSU) in 1968, where he spent the remainder of his academic career and became Distinguished Professor of History.

Marcus was particularly known for his studies of the Ethiopian emperors Menelik II and Haile Selassie. His principal works included The Life and Times of Menelik II: Ethiopia, 1844–1913 (1975), Ethiopia, Great Britain, and the United States, 1941–1974: The Politics of Empire (1983), Haile Sellassie I: The Formative Years, 1892–1936 (1987), and the general survey A History of Ethiopia (1994; updated edition 2002).

Beyond his publications, Marcus played a prominent institutional role in the development of Ethiopian and African studies in the United States. He founded and edited the journal Northeast African Studies for more than two decades, helped establish the electronic scholarly network H-Africa, served on the governing council of H-Net, organized Ethiopian-studies conferences at Michigan State, and was convenor of the Twelfth International Conference of Ethiopian Studies in 1994.

== Early life and education ==
Marcus was born on April 8, 1936, in Worcester, Massachusetts. He attended Clark University, graduating with a Bachelor of Arts degree in 1958. He then studied at Boston University, where he received his Master of Arts degree in 1959 and later his doctorate in 1964.

At Boston University, Marcus studied under anthropologist and African historian Daniel F. McCall. His graduate studies increasingly focused on Africa and particularly on Ethiopia, which subsequently became the principal subject of his academic career.

In 1961–1962, while affiliated with Boston University, Marcus received a U.S. government grant to work at University College Addis Ababa, later incorporated into Addis Ababa University. The Fulbright Scholar Program records him as working in history and African studies at University College Addis Ababa during the 1961–1962 academic year. A contemporary Fulbright directory listed Marcus as a Program Fellow in African Studies at Boston University and described his field as African studies and Western history.

The visit marked his first sustained period of research in Ethiopia. His surviving papers include an Amharic study notebook covering 1961–1963, as well as research materials from his early work in the country.

Marcus's doctoral dissertation, completed at Boston University in 1964, was entitled Britain and Ethiopia, 1896 to 1914: A Study of Diplomatic Relations. It examined British policy toward Ethiopia in the period following the Ethiopian victory at the Battle of Adwa, including British concerns over the Nile basin, French influence, European rivalry at the Ethiopian court, and the foreign policy of Menelik II.

His early research in Ethiopia provided the basis for a series of articles on Anglo-Ethiopian diplomacy, the borders of the Ethiopian state, the Rodd Mission, the Tripartite Treaty of 1906, and Menelik II's foreign policy.

== Academic career ==
Marcus began his teaching career as a visiting assistant professor of history at Haile Selassie I University, now Addis Ababa University. From 1963 until 1968 he was assistant professor of history at Howard University in Washington, D.C.

In 1968 he was recruited by Michigan State University. He remained at MSU for the rest of his career, teaching African and Ethiopian history for approximately thirty-five years and ultimately holding the rank of Distinguished Professor of History.

Marcus was closely involved with African studies at Michigan State. His archival papers contain extensive records of the university's African Studies Center from 1968 onward, the Ethiopian Studies Committee, university cooperation with Haile Selassie I University, the Mid-West Universities Consortium for International Activities, and projects involving Ethiopian academic institutions. In his obituary for Marcus, historian Gérard Prunier described the African Studies Center at Michigan State as a center Marcus had run effectively.

Marcus also held visiting appointments at the University of Khartoum in Sudan and Osaka Gaidai University in Japan, and lectured at numerous universities and colleges internationally.

During the 1985–1986 academic year he was a fellow at the National Humanities Center. His archival papers also document participation in the National Humanities Center's 1992 History Summer Institute.

In 1996 Marcus was nominated for a distinguished professorship at Michigan State, according to his university papers.

=== Return to Ethiopia and second Fulbright ===
Marcus returned to Ethiopia as a Fulbright U.S. Scholar in 1999–2000. Based at the Institute of Ethiopian Studies of Addis Ababa University, his research project was entitled The Last 15 Years of the Life and Times of Haile Sellassie I of Ethiopia.

The project was connected to Marcus's long-running attempt to complete the second part of his biography of Haile Selassie, which was intended to continue his earlier volume from the Italian invasion of Ethiopia in 1935–1936 through the emperor's overthrow and death in the 1970s.

Thus Marcus's direct academic association with Ethiopia extended from his first research period in 1961–1962 until another major research stay nearly four decades later in 1999–2000.

== Scholarship ==
Marcus's research concentrated primarily on the political, diplomatic and international history of modern Ethiopia, although he also wrote about African history more broadly and about the development and decline of European colonialism in Africa.

His research made extensive use of multinational archival collections. His surviving research papers contain material from Ethiopian archives as well as the British Foreign Office, the United States Department of State, French diplomatic archives and the Italian Foreign Ministry archives. They include records extending from the nineteenth century through the Cold War, as well as translations of Ethiopian documents and field notes.

=== Early diplomatic history ===
Marcus's first major field of research was the diplomatic history of Ethiopia under Menelik II. During the 1960s he published studies of British involvement in Ethiopia, Ethiopian-British boundary negotiations, the Rodd Mission, the Anglo-French-Italian Tripartite Treaty of 1906, Menelik's foreign policy and the emperor's final years.

One of his early articles, "Ethio-British Negotiations Concerning the Western Border with Sudan, 1896–1902", appeared in The Journal of African History in 1963. The research had been supported by a United States government Smith–Mundt grant and drew partly on archival material assembled in Ethiopia.

His early work increasingly expanded from diplomatic history into the political formation and territorial consolidation of the modern Ethiopian state.

=== Bibliography of Ethiopia and the Horn of Africa ===
In 1972 Marcus published The Modern History of Ethiopia and the Horn of Africa: A Select and Annotated Bibliography through the Hoover Institution Press. The bibliography assembled and annotated scholarship and primary accounts relating to modern Ethiopia and neighboring regions, with particular strength in nineteenth-century travel literature.

Marcus's papers preserve the card catalogue used in compiling the bibliography.

=== Menelik II ===
Marcus developed much of his earlier research into a political biography of Menelik II. The Life and Times of Menelik II: Ethiopia, 1844–1913 was published by Clarendon Press in 1975 as part of the Oxford Studies in African Affairs series.

The book followed Menelik from his early career as ruler of Shewa through his accession as emperor, the expansion and consolidation of the Ethiopian state, diplomatic relations with European powers, the conflict with Italy and victory at the Battle of Adwa, and the final years of his reign.

Marcus also published a number of related studies on Menelik's palace, administration, diplomacy, foreign policy and territorial expansion.

The Life and Times of Menelik II was reissued by the Red Sea Press in 1995.

=== Ethiopia, Britain and the United States ===
Marcus later extended his diplomatic research into the twentieth century. In 1983 the University of California Press published Ethiopia, Great Britain, and the United States, 1941–1974: The Politics of Empire.

The book examined Ethiopia's international position from the restoration of Haile Selassie following the Italian occupation through the fall of the monarchy in 1974. Particular attention was given to the decline of British influence, Ethiopia's increasingly important relationship with the United States, Cold War strategy in the Horn of Africa, and Haile Selassie's efforts to preserve Ethiopian autonomy within an international system dominated by larger powers.

The book was reviewed by political scientist John Markakis in The Journal of African History.

=== Haile Selassie ===
Marcus subsequently turned to a large-scale biography of Haile Selassie. The first volume, Haile Sellassie I: The Formative Years, 1892–1936, was published by the University of California Press in 1987.

The biography traced Tafari Makonnen from his childhood and early political career through his emergence as regent, his accession to the throne as Haile Selassie I, his domestic and foreign policies and the beginning of the Second Italo-Ethiopian War.

The work was reviewed in The Journal of African History by historian Alessandro Triulzi.

Marcus intended the 1987 work to be followed by another volume covering the remainder of Haile Selassie's life and reign. He continued working on the project throughout the 1990s and into the final years of his life, including during his Fulbright research period at Addis Ababa University in 1999–2000.

His archive identifies the planned second biography under the title Man Out of Time, covering the years 1936–1975. Drafts of chapters one, two and four survive from around 2001, while another file dated 2002 contains drafts of chapters one through nine described in the archive catalogue as a complete text apart from its introduction.

Contemporary memorials indicated that a continuation of his Haile Selassie biography was expected to appear after his death, but it was never issued as a published second volume.

=== Haile Selassie's autobiography ===
Marcus was also involved in the publication of the second volume of Haile Selassie's autobiography, My Life and Ethiopia's Progress. The English edition was published by Michigan State University Press in 1994 as part of the African Historical Sources series.

The volume was edited and annotated by Marcus with Ezekiel Gebissa and Tibebe Eshete, with Gebissa serving as the principal translator from Amharic.

Marcus also published an article in History in Africa discussing the problems involved in translating the emperor's account.

=== A History of Ethiopia ===
Marcus's broadest synthetic work was A History of Ethiopia, first published by the University of California Press in 1994.

Unlike his earlier monographs, which focused primarily on modern diplomatic and political history, A History of Ethiopia presented a general narrative of Ethiopian history beginning in antiquity and extending into the late twentieth century. Marcus discussed political, economic and cultural developments and devoted substantial attention to the formation of the modern Ethiopian state under Tewodros II, Yohannes IV, Menelik II and Haile Selassie.

An updated edition appeared in 2002. Marcus added a new preface, two chapters and an epilogue addressing developments after the overthrow of the Derg, the establishment of Ethiopia's federal political system and the Eritrean–Ethiopian War.

The first edition was reviewed by Ethiopian historian Bahru Zewde in The Journal of African History.

In a 2021 historiographical review, Gebeyehu Temesgen Duressa and Gemechu Kenea Geleta described Marcus as one of the leading North American historians of modern Ethiopia and noted the breadth of A History of Ethiopia, particularly its effort to combine political, economic and cultural history. They also criticized the book's concentration on the central and northern Christian state and argued that histories of southern peoples, peripheral regions and non-Christian communities received insufficient treatment.

== Ethiopian oral history project ==
During the late 1980s Marcus undertook an Ethiopian oral-history project. His Michigan State archive contains project files dated 1987–1989, including an application to the National Endowment for the Humanities and twelve recorded interview tapes.

The recorded interviews include conversations with Ethiopian scholars and intellectuals Guluma Gemeda, Daniel Kendie, Almaz Zewdie and Getachew Bagashaw conducted in 1988 and 1989.

The oral-history material complemented Marcus's extensive use of written diplomatic and governmental archives.

== Ethiopian studies and academic institution-building ==
Marcus was active in developing Ethiopian studies as an organized academic field in the United States.

At Michigan State he participated in the Ethiopian Studies Committee during the 1970s and in programs linking MSU with Haile Selassie I University. His archival records document committee meetings, visiting Ethiopian faculty, academic exchanges and institutional cooperation between American and Ethiopian universities.

He also participated in the Committee for the Publication of African Historical Sources during the 1980s and worked with Michigan State University Press on projects intended to make African historical documents available to researchers.

=== First United States Conference on Ethiopian Studies ===
Marcus was among the organizers of the First United States Conference on Ethiopian Studies, held at Michigan State University from May 2 to 5, 1973.

Together with anthropologist John T. Hinnant, he edited the conference proceedings, which were published in 1975 by the African Studies Center at Michigan State University.

=== Northeast African Studies ===
Marcus founded the academic journal that became Northeast African Studies. Its predecessor, Ethiopianist Notes, appeared in 1977 and 1978 before the publication adopted the title Northeast African Studies in 1979.

Marcus edited the journal for more than twenty years. Under his editorship it published scholarship on Ethiopia and neighboring societies in the Horn and Northeast Africa, including history, politics, anthropology, economics and related disciplines.

His papers at Michigan State contain extensive editorial correspondence and submitted manuscripts from scholars including Haggai Erlich, Getatchew Haile, Christopher Clapham, Peter Garretson and other specialists in Ethiopian and Northeast African studies.

The journal was subsequently published by Michigan State University Press.

=== Twelfth International Conference of Ethiopian Studies ===
In September 1994 Michigan State University hosted the Twelfth International Conference of Ethiopian Studies, with Marcus serving as convenor.

The conference was held from September 5 to 10, 1994 under the theme "Rethinking Ethiopian Studies". It brought together researchers working in fields including history, literature, linguistics, philology, archaeology, anthropology, politics, economics, geography, art, music and development studies.

Marcus edited the conference proceedings with linguist Grover Hudson as associate editor. They were published in two volumes by the Red Sea Press under the title New Trends in Ethiopian Studies.

The two volumes were divided broadly between humanities and human-resources subjects and the social sciences.

== H-Africa and digital scholarship ==
Marcus also played a significant role in the early development of electronic scholarly networks devoted to African studies.

At the 1994 annual meeting of the African Studies Association in Toronto, he promoted the idea of an Internet discussion network that could link Africanists working at universities around the world. He recruited several of its initial editors and helped establish H-Africa, which went online in March 1995 as part of H-Net: Humanities and Social Sciences Online.

Marcus became one of H-Africa's founding editors. He viewed electronic communication as a means of reducing the isolation of scholars, particularly researchers based at smaller institutions and African universities with limited access to academic journals and books.

He subsequently encouraged the creation of additional H-Net networks dealing with African art, literature, research and teaching. He also supported the development of H-Net's electronic book-reviewing system and advocated greater circulation of African scholarship through digital networks.

His involvement led to his election to the governing Council of H-Net.

Only about ten days before his death in January 2003, Marcus participated in the annual meeting of the American Historical Association, where he introduced a panel on electronic scholarship and discussed H-Africa and electronic academic collaboration.

== Public engagement ==
Marcus also commented publicly on contemporary affairs in Ethiopia and the Horn of Africa. His colleagues recalled that journalists and government officials frequently consulted him on regional political questions.

His university archive contains records of consultancy work, interviews, conferences, public lectures and correspondence concerning Ethiopian politics and human-rights issues.

During the 1983–1985 famine in Ethiopia, Marcus published "The Politics of Famine: More Than Drought Has Stricken Ethiopia" in Worldview. The article discussed the political dimensions of famine under the Derg and was later incorporated into the record of a United States congressional hearing concerning human rights and food assistance in Ethiopia.

Contemporary memorials described Marcus as an advocate for human rights in Ethiopia and other parts of Africa.

== Reception and influence ==
Marcus's work became widely used within Ethiopian and African historical studies. His biographies of Menelik II and Haile Selassie were reviewed in major African-history journals, while A History of Ethiopia became one of his most widely circulated publications.

Prunier described Marcus as a major teacher of African history whose decades at Michigan State contributed to the training of a generation of American Africanists. Memorials by his colleagues similarly emphasized both his research output and his role in connecting scholars through conferences, journals and electronic networks.

Marcus's contributions were recognized during his lifetime with a Festschrift. In 1998 the African Studies Center at Boston University published Personality and Political Culture in Modern Africa: Studies Presented to Professor Harold G. Marcus, edited by Melvin E. Page, Stephanie F. Beswick, Tim Carmichael and Jay Spaulding.

The volume itself received reviews in journals including African Affairs, The International Journal of African Historical Studies and The Journal of Modern African Studies.

== Personal life and death ==
Marcus was married to Cressida Marcus. He also had a daughter, Emma Rose.

He died on January 15, 2003, aged 66. Contemporary notices reported that his death resulted from cardiac arrest following complications associated with an existing heart condition.

At the time of his death he remained active in teaching, research, H-Net and the preparation of his unfinished second volume on Haile Selassie.

== Archives ==
Marcus's scholarly and personal papers are preserved by the Michigan State University Archives and Historical Collections as the Harold G. Marcus Papers, collection UA.17.309.

The collection comprises approximately 14.5 cubic feet of material dating from 1852 to 2007, with most of the documents dating from 1960 to 2003.

It includes correspondence, research notebooks, field notes, archival transcriptions, translations of Amharic documents, teaching material, conference records, journal correspondence, photographs, slides, unpublished manuscripts, oral-history recordings and drafts of Marcus's books and articles.

Among the material are:

- his Amharic study notebook from 1961 to 1963;
- field notes and translations of Amharic manuscripts;
- research from British, American, French, Italian and Ethiopian archives;
- records of the Ethiopian Oral History Project;
- drafts of The Life and Times of Menelik II;
- drafts of Haile Sellassie I: The Formative Years;
- manuscripts relating to A History of Ethiopia;
- drafts of the unpublished Man Out of Time;
- editorial records for Northeast African Studies;
- records of Ethiopian-studies conferences;
- correspondence relating to Ethiopian politics and public affairs;
- and his curriculum vitae dated February 20, 2002.

The papers were donated to the Michigan State University Libraries by Cressida Marcus on behalf of Marcus's estate in 2007 and were subsequently transferred to the University Archives and Historical Collections.

== Selected works ==
=== Books ===
- The Modern History of Ethiopia and the Horn of Africa: A Select and Annotated Bibliography. Stanford: Hoover Institution Press, 1972.
- The Life and Times of Menelik II: Ethiopia, 1844–1913. Oxford: Clarendon Press, 1975; reissued by Red Sea Press, 1995.
- Ethiopia, Great Britain, and the United States, 1941–1974: The Politics of Empire. Berkeley: University of California Press, 1983.
- Haile Sellassie I: The Formative Years, 1892–1936. Berkeley: University of California Press, 1987.
- A History of Ethiopia. Berkeley: University of California Press, 1994; updated edition, 2002.

=== Edited works ===
- Marcus, Harold G., and Donald Crummey, eds. Ethiopia: Land and History. Rural Africana, no. 11. East Lansing, 1970.
- Marcus, Harold G., and John T. Hinnant, eds. Proceedings of the First United States Conference on Ethiopian Studies, Michigan State University, 2–5 May 1973. East Lansing: African Studies Center, Michigan State University, 1975.
- Haile Selassie I. My Life and Ethiopia's Progress, vol. 2. Edited and annotated by Harold G. Marcus, Ezekiel Gebissa and Tibebe Eshete. East Lansing: Michigan State University Press, 1994.
- Marcus, Harold G., ed.; Grover Hudson, associate ed. New Trends in Ethiopian Studies: Papers of the 12th International Conference of Ethiopian Studies, Michigan State University, 5–10 September 1994. 2 vols. Lawrenceville, New Jersey: Red Sea Press, 1994.

=== Selected articles and chapters ===
- "A Note on the First United States Diplomatic Mission to Ethiopia in 1903". Ethiopia Observer 8 (1963): 162–168.
- "A Background to Direct British Diplomatic Involvement in Ethiopia, 1894–1896". Journal of Ethiopian Studies 1, no. 2 (1963): 121–132.
- "Ethio-British Negotiations Concerning the Western Border with Sudan, 1896–1902". The Journal of African History 4, no. 1 (1963): 81–94.
- "The Last Years of the Reign of the Emperor Menilek, 1906–1913". Journal of Semitic Studies 9 (1964): 229–234.
- "A Preliminary History of the Tripartite Treaty of December 13, 1906". Journal of Ethiopian Studies 2 (1964): 21–40.
- "The Rodd Mission of 1897". Journal of Ethiopian Studies 3 (1965): 25–35.
- "The Foreign Policy of the Emperor Menelik, 1896–1898: A Rejoinder". The Journal of African History 7, no. 1 (1966): 117–122.
- "History of the Negotiations Concerning the Border Between Ethiopia and British East Africa, 1897–1914". Boston University Papers on Africa 2 (1966): 237–265.
- "Motives, Methods and Some Results of the Unification of Ethiopia During the Reign of Menilek II". In Proceedings of the Third International Conference of Ethiopian Studies (1969): 269–280.
- "Imperialism and Expansionism in Ethiopia from 1865 to 1900". In L. H. Gann and Peter Duignan, eds., Colonialism in Africa (1969).
- "The End of the Reign of Menelik II". The Journal of African History 11, no. 4 (1970): 571–589.
- "The Organization of Menilek's Palace and Imperial Hospitality (After 1896)". Rural Africana 11 (1970): 57–62.
- With Melvin E. Page, "John Studdy Leigh: First Footsteps in East Africa". The International Journal of African Historical Studies (1972): 470–478.
- "The Black Men Who Turned White: European Attitudes Towards Ethiopians, 1850–1900". Archiv Orientální 39 (1971): 155–166.
- "The British and the Ethiopian Railway". In African Dimensions (1975): 29–51.
- "The Infrastructure of the Italo-Ethiopian Crisis: Haile Sellassie, the Solomonic Empire, and the World Economy, 1916–1936". In Proceedings of the Fifth International Conference of Ethiopian Studies (1979): 559–567.
- "Disease, Hospitals, and Italian Colonial Aspirations in Ethiopia, 1930–1935". Northeast African Studies 1, no. 1 (1979): 21–26.
- "Genesis of an Ethiopian Monarch: Haile Sellassie, 1916–1918". Horn of Africa 3, no. 4 (1980): 46–50.
- "France's Abandonment of Ethiopia to Italy, 1928–1935". In Stanislav Segert and András J. E. Bodrogligeti, eds., Ethiopian Studies Dedicated to Wolf Leslau (1983): 430–437.
- "The Embargo on Arms Sales to Ethiopia, 1916–1930". The International Journal of African Historical Studies 16, no. 2 (1983): 263–279.
- "American Security and Ethiopia, 1948–1953". In Proceedings of the Seventh International Conference of Ethiopian Studies (1984): 351–357.
- "Somalia and the Decline of American Interest in Ethiopia, 1963–1969". In Proceedings of the International Congress of Somali Studies (1984): 279–289.
- "The Politics of Famine: More Than Drought Has Stricken Ethiopia". Worldview 28 (1985): 20–23.
- "The Ethiopian Factor in Mussolini's Decision to Go to War in 1935". In Discovering the African Past: Essays in Honor of Daniel F. McCall (1987): 73–94.
- "Continuation in Ethiopian Foreign Policy from Menilek to Mengistu". In Proceedings of the Second International Conference on the Horn of Africa (1987): 127–130.
- "The Greening of African History". The Historian 51, no. 3 (1989): 467–474.
- "Quest for the Sea: Ras Tafari in Europe, 1924". In Proceedings of the Eighth International Conference of Ethiopian Studies, vol. 2 (1989): 243–251.
- "The Corruption of Ethiopian History". In Preproceedings of the Sixth Michigan State University Conference on Northeast Africa (1992): 220–222.
- "Translating the Emperor's Words: Volume II of Haile Sellassie's 'My Life and Ethiopia's Progress'". History in Africa 20 (1993): 413–420.
- "Haile Sellassie's Leadership". In New Trends in Ethiopian Studies (1994): 840–845.
- "Haile Sellassie's Development Policies and Views, 1916–1960". In Études éthiopiennes: Actes de la Xe conférence internationale des études éthiopiennes, vol. 1 (1994): 641–648.
- "1960, the Year the Sky Began Falling on Haile Sellassie". Northeast African Studies 6, no. 3 (1999): 11–25.

Marcus also contributed a number of biographical entries to the 1977 Encyclopaedia Africana: Dictionary of African Biography, including entries concerning Haile Selassie I, Menelik II, Zewditu and other Ethiopian historical figures.
