= Cushitic-speaking peoples =

Collection of ethnic groups residing in East Africa

- Map of the ethnic groups who speak Cushitic languages

Regions with significant populations
- Egypt, Sudan, Horn of Africa, East Africa

Languages
- Cushitic languages

Religion
- Islam (Sunni, Sufism), Christianity (Oriental Orthodox, P'ent'ay, Catholicism), Haymanot Judaism, Waaqeffanna

Cushitic-speaking peoples are the ethnolinguistic groups who speak Cushitic languages natively. Cushitic languages are spoken as a mother tongue primarily in the Horn of Africa, with minorities speaking Cushitic languages in southeastern Egypt, Sudan, Kenya, and Tanzania.

== History ==
Donald N. Levine held that Proto-Cushitic was spoken on the Ethiopian Highlands by 5000–4000 BC. Roger Blench hypothesizes that speakers of Cushitic languages may have been the producers of "Leiterband" pottery, which influenced the pottery of the Khartoum Neolithic. Erik Becker, in a 2011 investigation of human remains from Leiterband sites in the Wadi Howar, finds the hypothetical connection of Leiterband pottery to speakers of a Cushitic language improbable.

=== North Cushitic ===
The nomadic Medjay and the Blemmyes—the latter a section of the ethnic descendants of the former—are believed by many historians to be ancestors of modern-day speakers of Beja; there appears to be linguistic continuity, suggesting that a language ancestral to Beja was spoken in the Nile Valley by the time of the Twelfth Dynasty of Egypt. From an analysis of the lexicon of the Nubian languages, Marianne Bechhaus-Gerst proposes that when Nubian speakers first reached the Nile Valley ca 1500 BC, they encountered Cushitic-speaking peoples from whom they borrowed a large number of words, mainly connected with livestock production. Evidence shows that the linguistic association of the Nubian languages encounters contact with an Eastern Cushitic variation resembling Highland Eastern Cushitic, rather than Beja-related speech. This rewrites the temporal-geographical territorial existence of Eastern Cushites during the 2nd millennium BCE, placing them closer to the Nile Valley than often hypothesized.

=== Possible lost branch ===
Roger Blench proposes that an extinct and otherwise unattested branch of Cushitic may be responsible for some of the pastoral cultural features of Khoekhoe people ca. 2000 years BP. As there are very few Khoekhoe words for which a Cushitic etymology is possible based on existing Cushitic languages, Blench proposes that the contact was with speakers of a now extinct and otherwise unattested Cushitic language which was replaced through assimilation during the Bantu expansion.

== Contemporary ethnic groups ==
=== Speakers of North Cushitic ===
- Beja people

=== Speakers of Central Cushitic languages ===
- Agaw people
  - Awi people
  - Beta Israel
  - Bilen people
  - Qemant people
  - Xamir people

=== Speakers of Lowland East Cushitic languages ===
- Oromo people
  - Boorana
  - Barento
  - Orma
- Somalis
- Afar people
- Saho people
- Irob people
- Rendille people
- Gabra
- Konso people
- Arbore people
- El Molo people (most no longer speak a Cushitic language)
- Daasanach people
- Waata (Oromo-speaking)
- Aweer people
- Dirasha people, who speak Dirasha language
- Bussa people, who are shifting away from Bussa language to Oromo, Dirasha, and Amharic.

=== Speakers of Highland East Cushitic languages ===
- Sidama people
- Hadiya people
- Gedeo people
- Kambaata people
- Burji people
  - Libido language
- Halaba people and Kebena people

=== Speakers of Yaaku-Dullay languages ===
- Yaaku people (the Yaaku language is no longer a living language, but there is a revival movement)
- Dullay languages
  - Tsamai language
  - Ale language

=== Speakers of West Rift Southern Cushitic languages ===
- Iraqw people
- Alagwa people
- Gorowa people
- Burunge people
