= Baiso language =

Afro-Asiatic language of Ethiopia

Baiso
- Giddicho, Alkali
- Native to: Ethiopia
- Region: in region of Lake Abaya
- Ethnicity: Bayso people (5,500 (2007 census)), Haro people (L2)
- Native speakers: 4,600 (2007 census)
- Language family: Afro-Asiatic: Cushitic; East; Omo-Tana; Baiso

Language codes
- ISO 639-3: bsw
- Glottolog: bais1246
- ELP: Bayso

Baiso or Bayso is an East Cushitic language belonging to the Omo–Tana subgroup, and is spoken in Ethiopia, in the region around Lake Abaya.

Alternative names for Baiso are Giddicho, named after an island on Lake Abaya, and Alkali.

According to the Baiso people, however, Giddicho is primarily the name given to the Baiso people by the Guji Oromo, a neighbor clan with close relationship to them. The Baiso term for Giddicho apparently is maman.

As the Baiso people are a minority ethnic group in Ethiopia, their language is endangered. Today, there are between 3 500 and 5 000 mother tongue speakers of Baiso. This number, however, is decreasing. About 95% of the Baiso are multilingual in at least four languages, the most prominent Amharic, which is also the language most young Baiso speakers today primarily use throughout their day.

Only recently, the writing system of the Latin alphabet was adapted to the Baiso language. Hence, it does not yet have any literary tradition and is not sufficiently documented.

== Geographic distribution ==
The Baiso people have come a long way to finally arrive at their present settlement area. They originally come from Jijiga, the capital of the Somali Region in eastern Ethiopia, which also explains the close relation between the Baiso and the Somali language.

Afterwards they migrated to Dire Dawa, then to Gobba in Bale, and finally to Giddicho, their current settlement area. Giddicho is an island on the big Abaya Lake and Baiso is spoken in two villages there, namely Baiso and Shigima. Today Baiso people, however, also live on the Golmaka island, in the villages Waajjifo and Shink'ik'k'o situated on the north-western shore of the lake, and in the Alge kebele, located in the Mi’rab Abaya District.

This geographic distribution also divides the Baiso people into fifteen different clans, which are the following: Achele, Achegele, Baallaa, Bayso, Dabboottee, Dakartee, Dhaantuu, Fagoo, Gondoo, Golmakaa, Maman kabarraak'as, Maman kat'ee, Mulmalee, Shigima and Warjii. Cooperation and friendship plays a big role among the different clans. However, it remains unclear whether there are lexical or phonetic differences in the Baiso spoken by the different clans.

== Classification ==
As mentioned above, Baiso is a Lowland East Cushitic language, more precisely a Nuclear Southern Lowland East Cushitic language belonging to the subgroup Omo-Tana. Amongst Baiso, the languages that are part of the Omo-Tana group are Dhaasanac, Arbore, El Molo, Rendille, Boni, and Somali.

Baiso is particularly close related to Rendille and to the Somali dialects of the Upper Juba region Digil and May. They share many phonological and morphological features, such as the relationship between gender and number or pluralization.

=== Linguistic influence on the Baiso language ===
Most noteworthy are the traces of the Somali language that remain in Baiso. Baiso does not merely share grammatic similarities with Somali but one clearly notices a Somali influence on the Baiso lexis. Especially the basic vocabulary and most of their morphological features are shared.

Moreover there is Oromo, the most spoken Cushitic language, which has influenced Baiso to this day. Oromo has influenced Baiso vocabulary as well as morphology, e.g. the verbal inflection.

Another, relatively recent, influence on Baiso comes from Amharic which is a very popular and widespread language among Baiso speakers and is mostly limited to cultural aspects within the language.

== Grammar ==
=== Noun Morphology ===
Nouns in the Baiso language are inflected for number and definiteness. Gender, on the other hand, is not marked on nouns but is rather expressed through an agreement of verbs, adjectives, and demonstratives. Hence, an adjective/verb/demonstrative will agree on the gender of the noun with which it occurs.

Baiso cases are expressed via postpositions, suffixes, or word order.

==== Number ====
The Baiso language has four number systems: singulative, singular, paucal, and plural. While the singular is never marked, the other number systems are marked by different suffixes that are added to the noun stems.

===== Singulative =====
To make a noun singulative, one adds the suffixes -titi or -ti to the noun stem. However, this alone does not indicate definiteness or indefiniteness. Heleeltiti, for instance, means both the woman and a woman. By additionally adding a specific demonstrative pronoun or koo, one can clearly indicate (in-)definiteness: heleeltiti hasse emette (the woman came.) or heleeltiti koo emette (a woman came).

===== Plural =====
The plural is formed in a more complex way. Even though most commonly the plural is indicated by suffixes, other possibilities are reduplication, internal modification, and vowel deletion.

Apparently, there are nine different plural suffixes: -dʒoIaal, -laal, - dʒool, -Ii, -Ie, -aal, -eel, -ool and -l. Most frequently appear -dʒoolaal, -dʒool and -laal. Based on the quantity they refer to, these suffixes can be separated into three different categories: small quantities, medium quantities, and large quantities. However, not only quantity plays a role in the formation of the plural but also the cluster argument. For instance, singular nouns that end with consonant phonemes are not pluralized by adding the suffix -laal because it causes an impermissible consonant cluster, e.g. luban (lion in English) cannot turn into *lubanlaal (lions). Moreover, the suffix -laal is commonly used for human entities and not for animals or objects.

It therefore appears that non only quantity but also phonemes and themes/concepts influence the plural suffix that is chosen. All singular nouns that end with the phonemes /b/ and /d/, for example, are pluralized by adding -eel and geminating the final consonant of the noun stem, e.g. agud (village) turns into aguddeel (villages). Moreover, also singular nouns that end with the vowel -e will ask for the suffix -eel when getting pluralized. In this case, the final vowel -e of the noun stem is deleted.

The least frequently used plural suffixes are -le and -li. However, there is an interesting observation to be added about the suffix -le. There are some words, like sulaale (wild animals) or wayyoole (leaders), which are inherently plural, thus have no singular form. Some other words, like zizaale (bee/bees) or lukkale (hen/hens), can be both singular or plural depending on the context they are used in.

Nevertheless, it can be said that most singular nouns can be combined with almost all of the plural suffixes available, all depending on the context one uses them in.

As mentioned above, there are other ways to pluralize singular nouns. One method to do this is reduplication in the form of repetition of the stem-final consonant (far less frequently also in the form of partial or total reduplication). For instance, some animate singular noun stems, parts of the human body, as well as plants take their plural form by the repetition of the stem-final consonant. Two different ways have been identified: (1) singular noun stem + V + CC + V, or (2) singular noun stem + VV + C. The C represents the final consonant that needs to be repeated, have a look at the following examples:

1. han (shoulder) turns into hananno (shoulders)
2. yiis (child) turns into yiisaas (children)

Due to the fact that Baiso doesn't allow a word to finish with geminated consonants, a final vowel as shown in (1) needs to be added. Moreover, a vowel (usually an /a/) in between the singular noun stem and the repeated consonant is needed only if the singular noun stem ends with a consonant. In case it doesn't, the reduplicated consonant is simply added to the noun stem, as in: nebe (ear) - nebebbo (ears).

Some singular nouns are also pluralized by internal modification (vowel deletion, vowel insertion, or vowel change), e.g. oroono (goat) - oreen (goats), or ilki (tooth) - ilko (teeth).

It needs to be kept in mind, that even though certain singular nouns can be pluralized by reduplication or internat modification, they can be just as well be pluralized by adding a suffix. This depends on the quantity that is being referred to. Take the example of ilki (tooth):

1. Internal modification: ilko refers to the teeth of a single person
2. Suffix -dʒool: ilkodʒool refers to the teeth of different people
3. Suffix -dʒoolaal: ilkodʒoolaal refers to a large number of teeth belonging to different types of humans and animals.

===== Paucal =====
The paucal number system refers to a group of a few individuals that are located at a particular place and time. This number system is a unique feature to Baiso as it is very rare for Cushitic languages. The paucal is formed by adding the suffix -dʒa or, less frequently, -dʒedʒa onto the singular noun stem. Hence, helaal (woman) turns into helaaldʒa (few women), and ker (dog) turns into kerdʒedʒa (few dogs).

In some cases, the paucal suffix is added to the plural form (pluralized either through reduplication or addition/deletion of vowels, not by adding a suffix) of a noun instead of its singular form. However, it is yet unclear, why this is.

==== Gender ====
As in most Cushitic languages, Baiso has two grammatical genders: masculine, and feminine. These are not marked on the noun itself but is rather expressed through an agreement with the corresponding verb, adjective, and demonstrative.

Most (in-)animate entities in Baiso are randomly assigned a gender. Animals, for instance, tend to have different names depending on whether the female or male animal is referred to. Sometimes, the terms korma (masculine) or t'altu (feminine) are also added to specify the gender of an animal. This system of gender identification may be borrowed from Oromo.

In Baiso language, the phenomenon of gender polarity also plays a role. Thus, change of number also results in the change of grammatical gender. This is a common occurrence in Cushitic languages.

Most singular masculine nouns and all singular feminine nouns turn masculine when pluralized. But there are exceptions where a singular masculine noun will turn feminine in the plural.

When certain singular masculine nouns (e.g. aabbo - parental uncle) are pluralized, they require a singular feminine agreeance on the verbs, demonstratives, and adjectives referring to them. Take this example:

Singular

aabbo hikki
{parental uncle} this.SG.M.
'this parental uncle'

Plural

aabbo -dʒolaal hitti
{parental uncle} -PL this.SG.F.
'these parental uncles'

A similar operation occurs when comparing the paucal and the plural. When a paucal noun is used in a sentence, it will require plural agreements on its verbs, adjectives, and demonstratives. However, a plural noun will require a singular masculine agreement on its verbs, adjectives, and demonstratives. An example:

hikki babbaar -jool ka- agaalsat -o -y-a
these man -PL REL.SG.M. learn -EPEN -COP.SG.M.
'These are men who learn.'

The exception to this rule are nouns that are inherently plural. These also ask for plural agreements.

==== Definiteness ====
In Baiso, indefiniteness usually is not marked. The only method is to add the cardinal numbers koo (one; masculine) and too (one; feminine) to the noun in question.

Definiteness, on the other hand, is marked on nouns by adding the suffixes -u, -e, -o, or -i onto the singular and plural noun stems, e.g. ker (a dog) - keru (the dog). The most frequently used vowel to mark definiteness is -i.

==== Case ====
The nominative and accusative cases are not marked on Baiso nouns, they are expressed by word order. Moreover, Baiso has the dative, genitive, instrumental, ablative, locative, and comitative cases, which are expressed in different ways.

===== Dative =====
The dative case, for instance, is expressed via the system of noun stem + -V:n. If the stem noun (1) ends with a long vowel, merely the consonant -n will be attached. If it (2) ends with a short vowel, the vowel will first be lengthened and -n will then be attached. However, if a (3) noun stem finishes with a consonant, the long vowel -u: and -n will be added. Look at these examples:

1. The personal name baallamoo turns into baallamoon to express its dative case.
2. The Baiso word ere for the English word son turns into ereen when dative.
3. Yisaas (children) turns into yisaasuun when dative.

===== Genitive =====
In Baiso, the genitive is expressed with the prefixes ka-, ta-, or o-. Which prefix is chosen, depends on the number and gender of the possessed entity.

For singular masculine and plural nouns, the prefix ka- is needed. For singular feminine nouns, ta- is needed. If the possessed entity is paucal, o- is prefixed.

===== Instrumental =====
The instrumental case indicates that a noun is used in order to achieve something. In Baiso, this case is expressed by adding the suffix -i to the noun stem.

If a noun ends with a short vowel, that exact vowel is lengthened and a -y- (epenthetic) is added onto it before attaching the final instrumental suffix -i. Take this example:

ese macha -y- -i so goos -t -e
she knife -EPEN- -INST meat cut -3.SG.F. -PFV
'She cut the meat with a knife.'

On the other hand, if a noun ends with a long vowel, one simply adds the epenthetic and the final suffix -i onto the noun stem. If the noun ends with a consonant, the case marker is simply attached to the noun.

===== Ablative =====
The ablative case in Baiso is expressed through the postpositional suffix -ko, as in:

wodalla -ti sooddoo -ko emet -e
boy -SG soddo -ABL come -PFV
'The boy came from Soddo.'

The ablative in Baiso expresses either movement from one place to another, or the origin of something or somebody.

===== Locative =====
Locative in Baiso is expressed through independent postpositions. These are the following:

1. orroo: in
2. guti: on
3. guunte: above
4. hegelli: under
5. dolle: near

However, sometimes the locative is also expressed by suffixing -y on a noun.

===== Comitative =====
Accompaniment, hence the comitative case, is marked by suffixing -ne to a noun. Usually, additionally to the suffix, the independent postposition wota (in English: together) is attached to the phrase. In informal situations, however, one of the two can be left out.

baallamoo yiis ka- keessa -ne wota baa bee
Ballamo children ASC- his -COM with market go.PFV
'Ballamo went to the market with his children.'

=== Pronouns ===
==== Personal pronouns ====
The following table shows all personal pronouns of the Baiso language:

			Subject	Object		Possessive pronouns		
			Subject	Direct	Indirect	Masculine	Feminine	Gloss
1st person	singular		ani 'I'	in 'me'	iin 'me'	(ka)ke	(ta)te	mine
1st person	plural		no 'we'	no 'us'	noon 'us'	(ka)kaani	(ta)taani	ours
2nd person	singular		ati 'you'	ku 'you'	kuun 'you'	(ka)ka	(ta)ta	yours
2nd person	plural		isin 'you'	isin 'you'	isinuun 'you'	(ka)kisin	(ta)tisin	yours
3rd person	singular	M	usu 'he'	usu 'him'	usuun 'him'	(ka)keessa	(ta)teessa	his
3rd person	singular	F	ese 'she'	ese 'her'	eseen 'her'	(ka)kise	(ta)tise	hers
3rd person	plural		iso 'they'	iso 'them'	isoon 'them'	(ka)kiso	(ta)tiso	theirs

===== Subject personal pronouns =====
As can be seen above, the Baiso language has seven independent personal pronouns distinguished according to number (and gender in the third person singular).

subject personal pronouns
Person/Gender	Singular	Plural
1	ani	no
2	ati	isin
3 SG.M	usu	iso
3 SG.F.	ese	iso

Furthermore, subject pronouns cannot always be emitted as is possible in some other languages. This is because some pronouns require the same verb forms. You can say both ati aante and ese aante, which would be translated into You ate and She ate, respectively.

Regarding the agreement marking of pronoun and verb, different rules are applied than with nouns. In fact, plural pronouns require a plural agreement on verbs, adjectives, as well as demonstratives. This is different from plural nouns, which require a masculine singular agreement.

===== Indirect personal pronouns =====
One might have noticed in the table above that the indirect personal pronouns in Baiso are being formed by attaching the dative suffix -n to the direct personal pronouns. In that case, the final vowel of each pronoun is lengthened, and in the case of isin, the long vowel -u: is inserted between the direct personal pronoun and the dative suffix.

===== Possessive pronouns =====
In regards to the possessive pronouns, Baiso distinguishes between masculine and feminine, depending on the gender of the entity possessed. To get a clearer picture, take these examples:

1. se (cow in English) is a singular feminine noun
2. min (house in English) is a singular masculine noun

Number	[sb's] cow	[sb's] house
1 SG	se ta-te 'my cow'	min ka-ke 'my house'
2 SG	se ta-ta 'your cow'	min ka-ka 'your house'
3 SG.M	se ta-teessa 'his cow'	min ka-keessa 'his house'

Moreover, if the entity possessed is a paucal form, the prefix o- and the respective masculine possessive noun is needed.

==== Demonstrative pronouns ====
The Baiso demonstrative pronouns include hikki, hilti, aakki, aalti, hassu, hasse, hin"i, and aan"i. They agree with the number and gender of the noun with which they occur. Therefore:

masculine object

ani hikka doot -ara
I this.M.OB want -IPFV
'I want this'

feminine object

usu hitta gelaat -ara
He this.F.OB love -IPFV
'He loves this'

In the following table you can see the classification of all demonstrative pronouns according to their number, gender, and distance (proximal, medial, distal):

Demonstrative pronouns
	Singular				Plural	
	Masculine		Feminine		Plural	
	Subject	Object	Subject	Object	Subject	Object
Proximal	hikki 'this'	hikka 'this'	hitti 'this'	hitta 'this'	hin"i 'these'	hin"a 'these'
Medial	hassu 'that'		hasse 'that'			
Distal	aakki 'that'		aatti 'that'		aan"i 'those'	

==== Interrogative pronouns ====
Baiso has six different interrogative pronouns: ayyo (who), me/memme (what), eekki (M.)/eetti (F.) (which), gore (when), and hagge (where). They are used in this form as both subject and object. Only ayyo builds an exception, it turns into ayyoon when dative and into ayyoos when plural.

Their position in the sentence is not fixed. Hence, it can take any possible position without the meaning of the sentence changing.

==== Reflexive pronouns ====
Baiso expresses its reflexive pronouns by the morpheme isi combined with the feminine possessive pronouns. Hence, there are:

	singular	plural
1st person	isi otte (myself)	isi ottaani (ourselves)
2nd person	isi otto (yourself)	isi ollisin (yourselves)
3rd person	isi olteessa (himself)	isi ottiso (themselves)
3rd person	isi attise (herself)	isi ottiso (themselves)

=== Adjectives ===
Adjectives in Baiso agree in number and gender with the noun they are referred to. They are pluralized either through suffixation or reduplication.

heleel -titi k'aro -ti eme -t -e
woman -SG wise -F come -F -PFV
'The wise woman came.'

To make an adjective plural by suffixation, the suffixes -oli, -dʒolaal, or -dʒool are added to the adjective stem. Some adjectives can also be pluralized by reduplicating their first syllable or the first part of the adjective stem, as in c'imin (thin; SG) which turns into c'ic'c'imin (PL). Moreover, there are also adjectives that are pluralized via total reduplication, e.g. dʒin (big; SG) turning into dʒindʒin (PL).

As can be seen in the table above, the suffix -ti is attached onto the adjective stem to indicate singular feminine. The suffix -ti is also added to any plural adjective, no matter if the entity the adjective refers to is masculine or feminine. On the other hand, one adds the suffix -ki to indicate singular masculine.

When an adjective occurs with the paucal form of a noun, either the suffix -n'i is attached onto the plural adjectives, or the prefix o- is attached to the singular adjective stems.

==== Predictive use of adjectives ====
When an adjective is predictively used, it occurs in combination with a copula verb, which both agree in number and gender with their respective noun.

iso o- gabaabban -i -y -a -an
they COML- short -EPEN -COP -IPFV -3PL
'They are short'

== Phonology ==
=== Consonants ===
The consonants of the Baiso language have a lot in common with other (Lowland) East Cushitic languages, e.g. it has a number of glottalized consonants, and lacks the voiced labiodental fricative /v/. However, there's elements that are not common for the language family and that are only found in Baiso; the most prominent examples are the two nasal implosives /n"/ and /m"/ and the lack of uvular and pharyngeal consonants.

Baiso has a consonant inventory of 28 consonants in total, which are classified into eight categories based on their manner of articulation: plosive stops, implosive stops, ejectives, fricatives, affricates, nasals, approximants and glides (semi-vowels). These are further subsumed under six places of articulation: bilabial, labiodental, alveolar, palatal, velar, and glottal.

Apparently, the category of ejectives occurs very seldom and has probably been introduced to Baiso by loans.

The following table shows all consonant phonemes occurring in Baiso:

Consonant phonemes
		Bilabial	Alveolar	Post- alveolar	Palatal	Velar	Glottal
Plosive	voiceless	(p)	t			k	ʔ
Plosive	voiced	b	d			ɡ	
Plosive	ejective	pʼ	tʼ			kʼ	
Plosive	implosive		ɗ				
Sibilant	voiceless		s	t͡ʃ			
Sibilant	voiced		(z)	d͡ʒ			
Sibilant	ejective		sʼ	t͡ʃʼ			
Fricative		f		ʃ			h
Nasal	plain	m	n		ɲ		
Nasal	implosive	mˀ	nˀ				
Trill			r				
Approximant			l		j		

Even though the consonant phonemes /p/, /h/, and /z/ appear in the table above, there is uncertainty about whether they really are part of the Baiso consonant inventory.

==== Plosive stops ====
In Baiso there are seven plosive stops (/b/, /p/, /d/, /t/, /g/, /k/, and /ʔ/), of which /p/ is one of the least frequently used consonant phonemes and /b/ one of the most frequently used.

Special about the voiced bilabial stop /b/ is, that even though it occurs in any word position, it changes sound according to where exactly it is located. Thus, if /b/ occurs between two vowels it is realized as a voiced bilabial fricative [β] or a geminated consonant. However, when it appears in a preconsonantal position, especially in front of the voiceless alveolar consonants /s/ and /t/, it is realized as the voiceless bilabial stop [p].

Hence, the word absi (fear in English) is pronounced [apsi], while luban (lion in English) is pronounced as [Iuβan].

Moreover, also the voiceless glottal stop /ʔ/ has striking features as it only occurs in word medial position and mostly in disyllabic words.

==== Implosives ====
Baiso has three implosives (/ɗ/, /m"/, and /n"/). As already mentioned, the nasal implosives /m"/ and /n"/ are unique to the Baiso language and cannot be found in other East Cushitic languages.

The alveolar implosive /ɗ/ barely appears in Baiso words. Apparently, it has mostly been replaced by the alveolar ejective /t'/ or has simply been removed, except in the intervocalic word medial position. This distinguishes Baiso from other East Cushitic languages where /ɗ/ is rather common, especially at the word beginning.

The voiced bilabial nasal implosive /m"/ has a similar sound to the voiceless glottal stop /ʔ/. It is a phoneme not included in the IPA chart. When articulating it, the air is trapped both at the lips and the glottis, but the air trapped at the glottis is released first which forces the air into the lungs. It appears in word medial position.

Just as well does the voiced alveolar nasal implosive /n"/ only appear in word medial position, mostly between the high front vowel /i/, between the mid, front vowel /e/, or between the back vowel /u/.The pronunciation of /n"/ is similar to /ɗ/ with the difference that, instead of a slight push, the tip of the tongue becomes stiff and is then forcefully pushed against the alveolar ridge.

==== Ejectives ====
Baiso has five ejectives (/p'/, /t'/, /s'/, /k'/, and /t͡ʃ/). The voiceless bilabial ejective /p'/ and the voiceless alveolar ejective /t'/ are amongst the least frequently used phonemes in Baiso. Furthermore, even though the phoneme barely occurs, Baiso is one of very few East Cushitic languages with /s'/ as part of the consonant inventory. The phoneme /t͡ʃ/, on the other hand, is often found in loan words from Amharic and Oromo.

==== Fricatives ====
Baiso has five fricatives (/f/, /s/, /z/, /h/, and /ʃ/). Except /z/, these fricatives are widely found in Baiso words. The voiceless palatal fricative /ʃ/ often occurs in loan words from Amharic as well.

The fricative /z/ is barely found in any Baiso words, just in a few loan words and certain place names. Comparing Baiso to Proto Lowland East Cushitic, the sound /z/ might have largely been replaced by /d/ in Baiso. In Proto Lowland East Cushitic, for example, the word wizena (heart in English) has the /z/ fricative in it, while in Baiso the word turned into wadana.

==== Affricatives ====
In Baiso, there are only two affricatives (/d͡ʒ/, and /t͡ʃ/). The phoneme /d͡ʒ/ occurs in many loan words from Afaan Oromoo.

==== Nasals ====
The Baiso consonant inventory includes two nasal phonemes (/m/, and /n/). The voiced alveolar nasal /n/ is the most frequently used phoneme in Baiso. It occurs in all word positions, except in postconsonantal position. The phoneme is realized in three different ways:

1. as voiced velar nasal /ŋ/ when followed by /k/, /k'/, or /g/
2. as voiced palatal nasal /ɲ/ when followed by palatals /d͡ʒ/ and /t͡ʃ/
3. as /n/ in all other occasions

==== Liquids ====
Baiso has two liquid phonemes (/l/, and /r/).

==== Glides/Approximants ====
There are two different glides (/w/, and /y/).

=== Vowels ===
In regards to the vowel inventory, most Cushitic languages have a five-term vowel system. Here, Baiso shares another similarity with its related languages. Hence, it has five short vowels and five contrastive long vowels, as can be seen in the table below.

Vowels
	Front	Central	Back
High/Close	i, iː		u, uː
Mid	e, eː		o, oː
Low/Open		a, aː	

Vowel length plays an important role in Baiso as it clearly distinguishes one word from another. For instance, while the word ken means 'five' in English, substituting the vowel /e/ with an /e:/ turns it into keen meaning 'leave!'.

Baiso words never have more than two identical vowels following one another. Moreover, a sequence of two similar vowels is treated as one unit, hence, they are not separated into two syllables.

=== Suprasegmental features ===
In regard to word stress, if a Baiso word consists of two syllables, the emphasis is made on its first syllable as long as its second syllable does not contain a long vowel or is a heavy syllable.

In trisyllable words, the penultimate syllable is stressed as long as the other syllables are not heavy syllables.

Regarding consonant gemination, two identical consonants can only occur in word medial position. There are a few phonemes that never occur as geminated consonants, which are the following: /m"/, /n"/, /h/, /z/, /ʃ/, and /ʔ/.

If a consonant appears in a postconsonantal position, it is almost never geminated, e.g. gamballakki (black in English). Moreover, consonant gemination also occurs across morpheme boundary, as in:

imin- -n -e
buy -1PL PFV
'we bought'

=== Syllabic structure ===
Most frequently and dominantly, Baiso has open syllables (-CV). Baiso's basic syllable structure is (C)V(V)(C). This shows, that the nucleus vowel, either long or short, is obligatory.

Generally, eight syllable types have been identified in Baiso language, which can be categorized into open (V, CV:, V:, CV) and closed syllables (VC, CVC, VVC, CVVC), as well as light (CV) and heavy syllables (CVV, CVVC, CVC). While it is very uncommon to find polysyllabic Baiso words, most are disyllabic, followed by trisyllabic and monosyllabic words.

== Syntax ==
=== Word order ===
==== Noun phrases ====
In noun phrases, hence, a sentence in which a noun is the head of the sentence and different types of complements surround it, the complements can both precede and follow the noun. Take these two example sentences:

complement follows noun

min ka- jinjin
house COML- big
'big houses'

complement precedes noun

ka- jinjin min
COML- big house
'big houses'

As you can see, in Baiso there is no rule as to whether the complement (in this case the adjective) follows or precedes the noun in a noun phrase. The same goes for demonstratives or possessive pronouns. In the case of quantifiers, most of them can both precede or follow the noun. An exception are numerals. Therefore, one can say both ibaado dubba and dubba ibaado (all people) but not both orono lama and *lama orono (two goats). In the latter example, only orono lama, hence the numeral following the head noun, is the correct form.

==== Postpositional phrases ====
Baiso is a postpositional language, in which the postpositions are either suffixes or independent words. In the case of postpositional phrases, the postpositions always follow the head noun, as in:

wadami -ti dolle
mountain -SNG near
'near the mountain'

==== Simple sentences ====
The basic Baiso word order is S-O-V. This word order, however, is flexible in some ways.

In storytelling or casual conversation for instance, the subject tends to take the last position of a sentence.

==== Relative clauses ====
Baiso relative clauses are introduced by the particles ka-, ta-, and o-, that are prefixed to the verb in the relative clause.

The relative clause can occur either at the beginning of a sentence, hence before the main clause, or it occurs between the subject and predicate of the main clause. Sometimes it is also positioned between subject and object or between object and predicate of the main clause. It is never found at the end of a sentence.
