= El Molo language =

Cushitic language of Kenya

El Molo
- Native to: Kenya
- Region: Lake Turkana
- Ethnicity: 560 El Molo people
- Extinct: 1999, with the death of Kaayo semispeakers exist
- Revival
- Language family: Afro-Asiatic: Cushitic; East; Lowland East; Western Omo–Tana; El Molo

Language codes
- ISO 639-3: elo
- Glottolog: elmo1238
- ELP: El Molo

El Molo (sometimes spelled Elmolo) is a moribund or extinct language belonging to the Cushitic branch of the Afro-Asiatic language family. It was spoken by the El Molo people on the southeastern shore of Lake Turkana, in northern Kenya. Alternate names to El Molo are Dehes, Elmolo, Fura-Pawa, and Ldes. It was thought to be extinct in the middle part of the 20th century, but a few speakers were found in the later 20th century. Most of the El Molo population have shifted to the neighboring Samburu language, and there are only semispeakers left. El Molo also has no known dialects but it is similar to Daasanach.

Oral tradition sees the El Molo people as an offshoot of the Arbore people in South Ethiopia. This seems to be confirmed by El Molo's linguistic proximity to the Arbore language.

== Classification ==
El Molo belongs to the Cushitic branch of the Afro-Asiatic family. The Cushitic languages are one of the largest language families of East Africa, spoken in an area stretching from North-East Sudan at the Egyptian border, embracing Eritrea, Djibouti, Somalia, Ethiopia, a considerable part of Kenya, and some areas of Northern Tanzania. Its closest relative is Arbore, followed by Dhaasanac, both spoken mainly across the border in southwest Ethiopia. These form the Arboroid subgroup of Cushitic.

The name El Molo is a Samburu name referring to people who do not use livestock as their source of income. The name is formed from the Samburu definite article l-, el- and the El Molo word molu (phonetically [ˈmóˑlo̝]) 'this person'.

An unsolved question is whether the Elmolo were “originally” speakers of a Cushitic language, and still another is whether they were always fishers or rather pastoralists who turned to fishing out of necessity in an area unsuitable for animal husbandry. Heine (1982) favors the first hypothesis, and claims that traditional fishing in Kenya’s Rift Valley is likely to go back to Eastern Cushites originating from the Ethiopian Highlands.

== Population ==
The El Molo population is also referred to as the “Dhes, Elmolo, Fura-Pawa, Ldes, and Ndorobo”. They are fishermen concentrated in two villages in Marsabit District on the southeast shore of Lake Turkana, between El Molo bay and Mount Kulal. Unlike their surrounding neighbors, the El Molo do not depend on livestock for livelihood. Fish is their main diet, but they occasionally they eat crocodile, turtle, and hippos. The population has been growing: 84 people were recorded in 1934, 143 people in 1973, approximately 200 in 1976. Counts by fieldworkers gave 613 in 2008 and approximately 700 by 2012; a much larger number of 2840 was reported in the Kenyan 2009 national census. According to the 2019 census, the ethnic population is about 1,100 and the population is decreasing yearly.

== Language shift ==
The language and most of the culture has been lost to assimilation from surrounding neighbors. Native transmission of El Molo largely ceased during the first half of the 20th century. The people at all ages now speak primarily Samburu, a Maasai language (dialect) of Kenya. Only eight fluent speakers, four men and four women aged over 50, were left by 1976. According to the community, the last “good” speaker, Kaayo, died in 1999, but it is still spoken.

=== Present day ===
The remaining few speakers of the language are fighting to keep the language alive. There is still a considerable quantity of preserved vocabulary for the language itself. The original Cushitic-Elmolo can be divided into items of basic vocabulary (such as body parts, numerals, names of plants and animals, and kinship terms). The Samburu dialect is now spoken in substitute of El Molo. All Cushitic material has lost its original phonology and morphosyntax, which have been adapted to Samburu. Present-day El Molo thus follows the phonological and morphological rules of Samburu.

=== Attempt at revitalization ===
In 1995 the “Elmolo Development Group” (EDG) was established to promote self-reliance among the Elmolo people especially in an attempt for revitalization. In this there also was an Elmolo language revival program that had begun. Founder and chairman, Michael Basili, of the Gura Pau was a teacher and later a schoolmaster and Education Officer of the Loiyangalani Division. He retired in 2006 and this is when he began to attempt to reinstate El Molo as the language of the community through school teaching. Basil and his collogues collected any further linguistic and anthropological data. Efforts were dropped in 2012 because it was difficult to implement and extend Cushitic lexical material as it was limited, or its knowledge was too unevenly spread among the community to be any help. Another thing discovered was how the El Molo people will not disclose themselves the population of their community. They believe that disclosing their numbers endangers them more, since over the years they have been assimilated by their surrounding communities.

== Bibliography ==
- Brenzinger, Matthias (ed). 1992. Language Death: Factual and Theoretical Explorations and Special Reference to East Africa. Berlin: Mouton de Gruyter.
- Brenzinger, Matthias. 1992. Lexical retention in language shift: Yaaku/ Mukogodo- Maasai and El-molo/Elmolo- Samburu. In Brenzinger (ed), 213–254.
- Bunyi, Grace. "Language in Education in Kenyan School". Encyclopedia of Language Education. Volume 5: 33.
- Dyson, W. S. and Fuchs, V. E. 1937. The Elmolo. Journal of the Royal Anthropological Institute of Great Britain and Ireland 67. 327–338.
- Fear of Extinction as the El Molo Numbers Drop (2010). allAfrica.com.
- Fishman, Joshua. Advances in language planning. Current Trend in Linguistics 7
- Hayward, Dick (1984). The Arbore Language: A first Investigation; including a vocabulary. Hamburg: Helmut Buske Verlag.
- Heine, Bernd (1980). "Elmolo". The Non-Bantu Languages of Kenya. Berlin: Dietrich Reimer. pp. 173–218.
- Joshua Project. "El Molo in Kenya". Retrieved 9 March 2018.
- Okuma, O. S. (2016). Conservation of Natural and Cultural Heritage in Kenya.
- Sobiana, N.W. (1980). The Historical Tradition of the People of the Eastern Lake Turkana Basin, ca. 1840-1925 (PhD thesis). London: University of London.
- Tosco, Mauro. 1998. "People who are not the language they speak": on language shift without language decay in East Africa. In Brenzinger, M. (ed.), Endangered languages in Africa, 119-142. Cologne: Rüdiger Köppe Verlag.
- Tosco, Mauro. 2012. What Terminal Speakers Can Do to Their Language: the Case of Elmolo. In Federico Corriente and Gregorio del Olmo Lete and Ángeles Vicente and Juan-Pablo Vita (eds.), Dialectology of the Semitic Languages. 131–143. Sabadell (Barcelona): Editorial AUSA.
- Tosco, Mauro (2015). "From Elmolo to Gura Pau: A Remembered Cushitic language of Lake Turkana and its possible revitalization". Studies in African Linguistics. 44 (2): 101–135. doi:10.32473/sal.v44i2.107258. hdl:2318/1563131.
