= Daasanach people =

Cushitic ethnic group in Ethiopia, Kenya and South Sudan

Daasanach
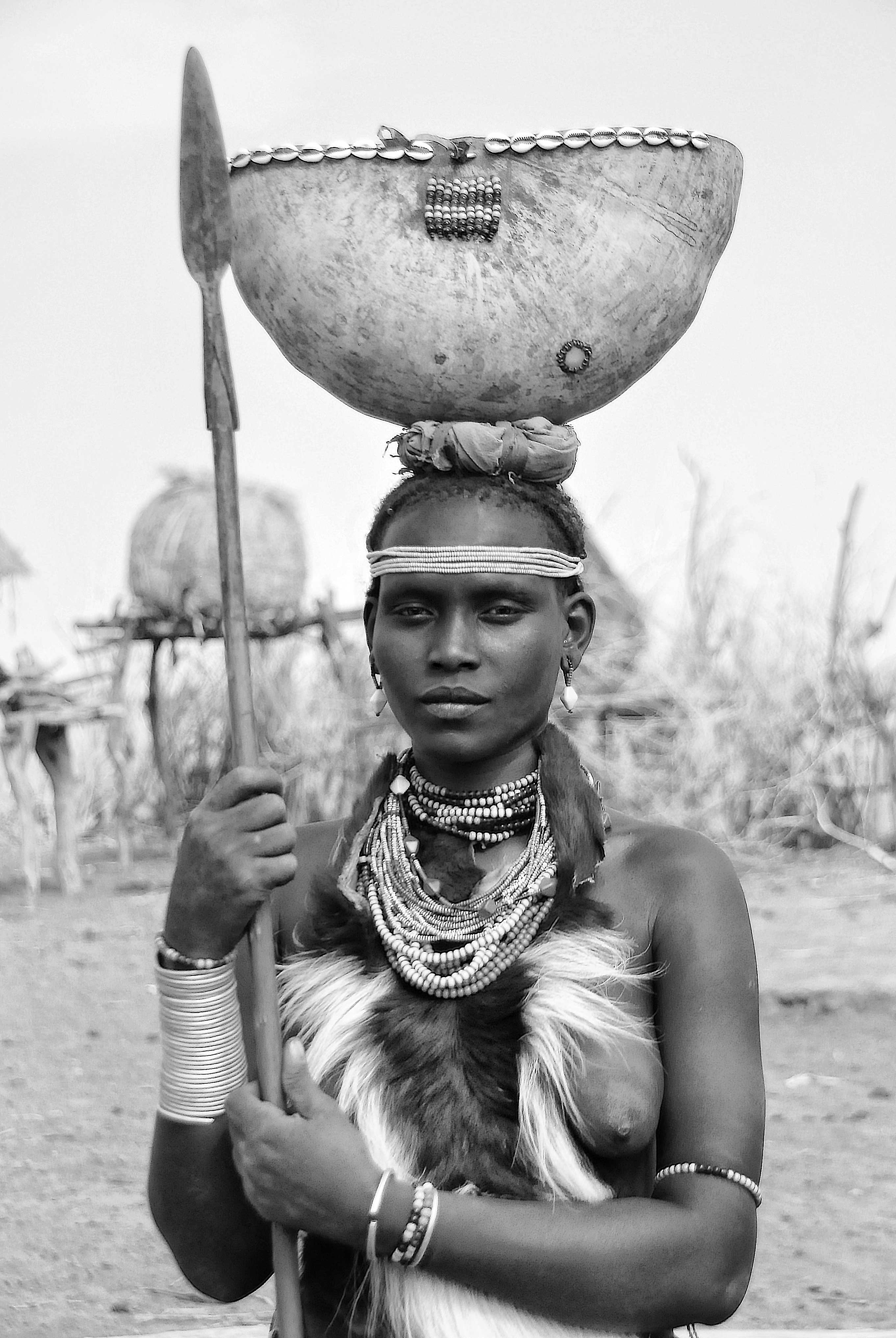
- A Daasanach woman

Total population
- Ethiopia 48,067 (2007 census); Kenya 19,337 (2019 Census)

Regions with significant populations
- Ethiopia, Kenya

Languages
- Daasanach; Amharic (second language)

Religion
- Traditional African religions and Christianity

Related ethnic groups
- Kalenjin people, (Note: The Daasanach along with the related Arbore form a branch with the Nyangatom (Teso-Turkanic) and the Karo (South Omotic) on the cladogram (a diagram used in cladistics) showing affinities between a wide sample of Ethiopian populations. See Supplementary Materials of López et al (2021), page 49."Evidence of the interplay of genetics and culture in Ethiopia".) Aroid (South Omotic) peoples such as the Karo, and Cushitic peoples (primarily of the Western Omo–Tana branch)

The Daasanach (also known as the Marille or Geleba) are an ethnic group inhabiting parts of Ethiopia, Kenya, and South Sudan. They are a descendant group of Maliri people, making them kin to Kalenjin peoples of Kenya, and Uganda especially Pokot and Sebei tribes. Their main homeland is in the Debub Omo Zone of the South Ethiopia Regional State, adjacent to Lake Turkana. According to the 2007 national census, they number 48,067 people (or 0.07% of the total population of Ethiopia), of whom 1,481 are urban dwellers.

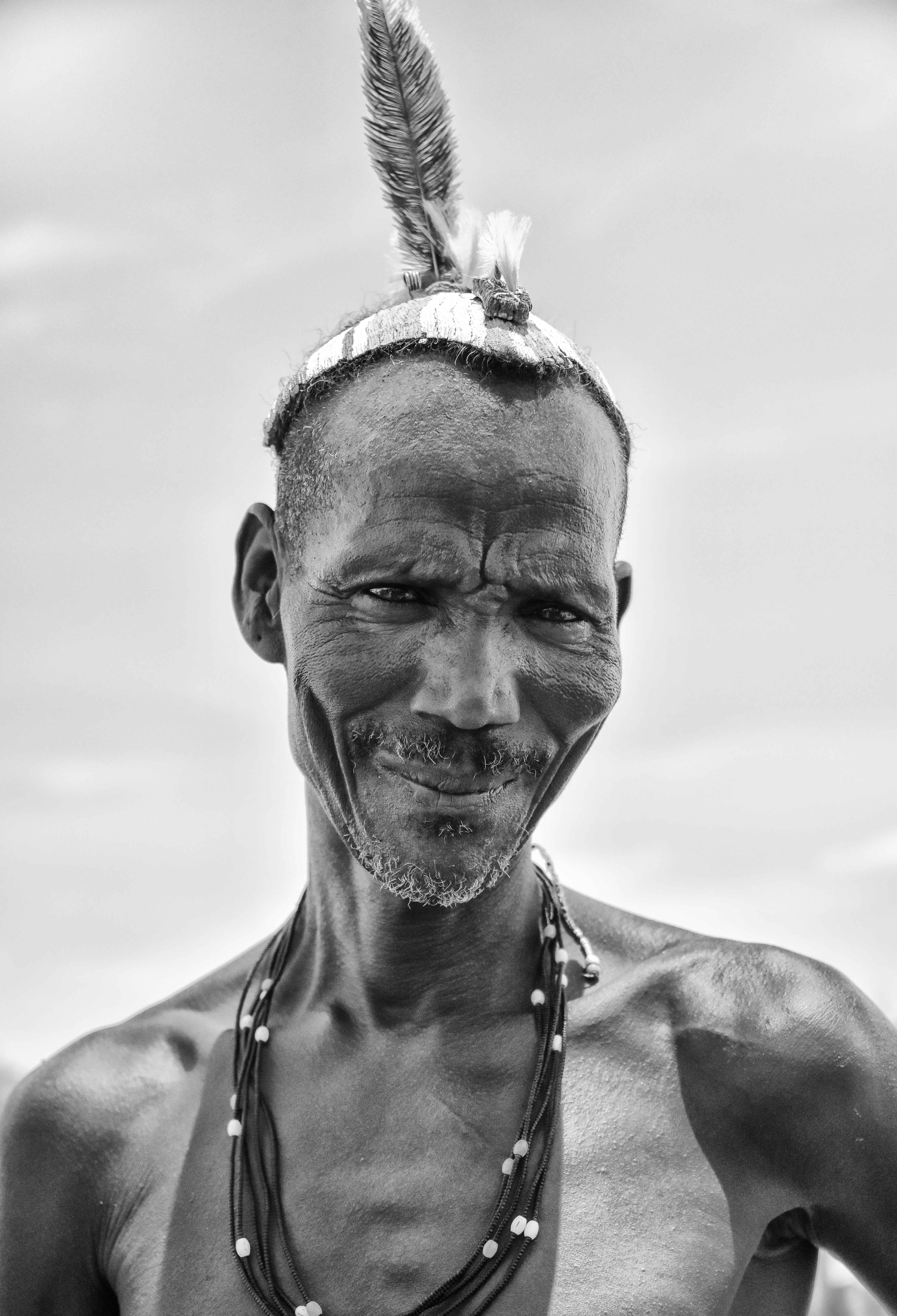
A Daasanach man

== History ==
The Daasanach are also called Marille, especially by their neighbours, the Turkana of Kenya. The Daasanach are traditionally pastoralists, but in recent years have become primarily agropastoral. Having lost the majority of their lands over the past fifty years or so, primarily as a result of being excluded from their traditional Kenyan lands, including on both sides of Lake Turkana, and the 'Ilemi Triangle' of South Sudan, they have suffered a massive decrease in the numbers of cattle, goats and sheep. As a result, large numbers of them have moved to areas closer to the Omo River, where they attempt to grow enough crops to survive. There is much disease along the river, including both human and animal trypanosomiasis (the tsetse fly has increased with forest and woodland development there), however, making this solution to their economic plight difficult. Like many pastoral peoples throughout this region of Africa, the Daasanach are a highly egalitarian society, with a social system involving age sets and clan lineages, both of which involve strong reciprocal relations.

== Language ==
The Daasanach today speak the Daasanach language. It belongs to the Cushitic branch of the Afro-Asiatic family. The language is notable for its large number of noun classes, irregular verb system, and implosive consonants. For instance, the initial D in Daasanach is implosive, sometimes written as <'D> or <Dh>.

== Genetics ==
Population genetic analyses of the Daasanach indicate that they are more closely related to Nilo-Saharan populations than they are to most Cushitic and Semitic Afro-Asiatic-speaking populations of Ethiopia. This suggests that the Daasanach were originally Nilo-Saharan speakers, sharing common origins with the Pokot. In the 19th century, the Nilotic ancestors of these two populations are believed to have begun separate migrations, with one group heading southwards into the African Great Lakes region and the other group settling in southern Ethiopia. There, the early Daasanach Nilotes would have come into contact with a Cushitic-speaking population, and eventually adopted this group's Afro-Asiatic language.

A 2021 study comparing a variety of Ethiopian populations discovered that the Daasanach people cluster closer to the Nilotic Nyangatom and the Aroid (South Omotic) Karo peoples than they do to most other Cushitic populations of Ethiopia.

== Daily life ==
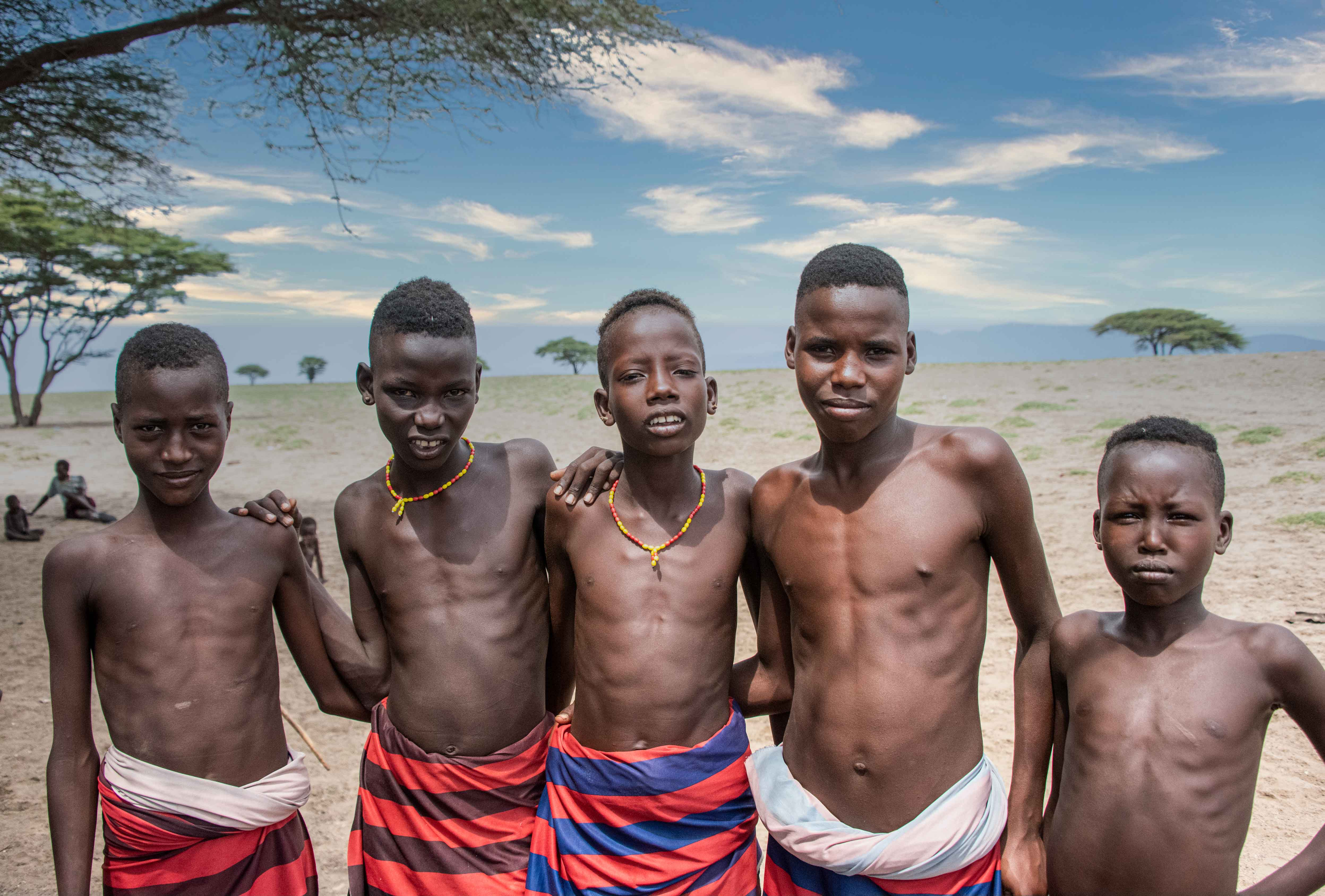
Daasanach boys

The Daasanach are a primarily agropastoral people; they grow sorghum, maize, pumpkins and beans when the Omo river and its delta floods. Otherwise the Daasanach rely on their goats and cattle which give them milk, and are slaughtered in the dry season for meat and hides. Sorghum is cooked with water into a porridge eaten with a stew. Corn is usually roasted, and sorghum is fermented into beer. The Daasanach who herd cattle live in dome-shaped houses made from a frame of branches, covered with hides and woven boxes (which are used to carry possessions on donkeys when the Daasanach migrate). The huts have a hearth, with mats covering the floor used for sleeping. The Dies, or lower class, are people who have lost their cattle and their way of living. They live on the shores of Lake Turkana hunting crocodiles and fishing. Although their status is low because of their lack of cattle, the Dies help the herders with crocodile meat and fish in return for meat.

Women are circumcised by removing the clitoris. Women who are not circumcised are called animals or boys and cannot get married or wear clothes. Women wear a pleated cowskin skirt and necklaces and bracelets. Women often marry in their late teens and men in their early twenties. Boys are circumcised. A man's wealth is determined by the size of his herd. Men with large herds often take multiple wives.

== Media coverage ==
There are a number of variant spellings of Daasanach, including Dasenach and Dassanech (the latter used in an episode about them in the TV series Tribe). Daasanach is the primary name given in the Ethnologue language entry.

== See also ==
- El Molo people
- Arbore people
- Western Omo–Tana languages
