= Aweer people =

Cushitic ethnic group

Aweer
Total population
- 20,103

Regions with significant populations
- Kenya, Somalia

Languages
- Aweer, Somali (In Somalia)

Religion
- Predominantly Sunni Islam 90% Minority Traditional 10%

Related ethnic groups
- Other Cushitic-speaking peoples, especially Garre

The Aweer (also known as the Boni, Waboni, Wa-Boni, and Sanye) are a Cushitic ethnic group inhabiting the Coast Province in southeastern Kenya. Some members are also found in southern Somalia. They are indigenous foragers, traditionally subsisting on hunting, gathering, and collecting honey.

== Overview ==
Evidence suggests that the Aweer/Boni, along with the related Dahalo and Wata, are remnants of the early Bushman hunter-gatherer inhabitants of Eastern Africa. According to linguistic, anthropological and other data, these groups later came under the influence and adopted the Afro-Asiatic languages of the Eastern and Southern Cushitic peoples who moved into the area. Dahalo has consequently retained some of the characteristic click sounds of the Khoisan languages.

The Aweer have historically been known in the literature as Boni or Sanye, both of which are derogatory terms for low-caste groups. Their lives were drastically changed when the Kenyan government curtailed their traditional way of life in the 1960s, forcing them to settle in villages along the Hindi-Kiunga Road, between the Boni National Reserve and the Dodori National Reserve. Although the majority of the Aweer settled in villages located in this corridor between the two reserves, some established themselves in nearby Bajuni villages.

Today, the Aweer in Kenya have been encouraged to adopt farming as their main livelihood. However, they also continue to engage in many of their traditional hunter-gatherer practices, utilizing the nearby forests for the collection of wild honey, plants for traditional medicine and building materials, and bush meat to supplement their diets. With laws banning the hunting of all wildlife in Kenya, the Aweer's traditional way of life is in danger. Although Aweer overwhelmingly reside in the East African nation of Kenya, due to the Aweer's traditional dwellings along the protuberant coastline, the Aweer, as well as other inhabitants of Lamu County are sometimes referred to as Horners.

== Demographics ==
According to the 2019 Kenyan population census, around 20,103 Aweer live in Kenya, where they are an officially recognized group. They have traditionally been concentrated in forests in the Coast Province, particularly the Lamu and Tana River districts.

Some Aweer also inhabit southern Somalia's Badhade district.

== Language ==
The Aweer speak the Aweer language, also known as Boni. It belongs to the Cushitic branch of the Afro-Asiatic family.

According to Ethnologue, there are around 8,000 speakers of Aweer/Boni. Most are bilingual and speak the languages of their immediate neighbors, with about 20% speaking only Aweer.

Aweer linguistically resembles Garre, but the speakers are physically and culturally unalike. The language is believed to be threatened by extinction.

== Religion ==
The Aweer historically practised traditional faiths such as Waaqism, though most have today adopted Islam.

== See also ==
- Hadza
- Sandawe
