= Grover Hudson =

American linguist

Grover M. Hudson
- Born: June 8, 1940; Fort Worth, Texas, US
- Died: June 13, 2022 (aged 82); East Lansing, Michigan, US
- Education: University of California, Los Angeles (PhD)
- Spouse: Mutsuko Endo Hudson
- Parent(s): Joe Milton Hudson, Jeanette Izella Hudson
- Scientific career
- Workplaces: Michigan State University
- Thesis: Suppletion in the Representation of Alterations (1975)

Grover M. Hudson (June 8, 1940 – June 13, 2022) was an American linguist and Professor Emeritus of Linguistics, Germanic, Slavic, Asian and African Languages at Michigan State University. He was known for his works on the Amharic language.

== Works ==
- Suppletion in the representation of alternations, 1975
- Linguistics and the university education, 1980
- Hudson, Grover (1989). Highland East Cushitic Dictionary. Hamburg: Helmut Buske Verlag. ISBN 3-87118-947-2.
- New trends in Ethiopian studies : Ethiopia 94 : papers of the 12th International Conference of Ethiopian Studies, Michigan State University, 5-10 September 1994
- Essays on Gurage language and culture : dedicated to Wolf Leslau on the occasion of his 90th birthday, 1996
- Essential introductory linguistics, 1999
- Anbessa Teferra and Grover Hudson (2007). Essentials of Amharic. Cologne: Rüdiger Köppe Verlag.
- Ethiopian Semitic archaic heterogeneity
- Ethiopian Semitic negative nonpast
- Ethiopian Semitic Overview
- Ethiopic Documents: Argobba Grammar and Dictionary
- Geoloinguistic evidence for Ethiopian semitic prehistory
- Gurage Studies: Collected Articles
- History of the people of Ethiopia
- Northeast African semitic lexical comparisons and analysis
- Paradigmatic Initiation of a Sound Change in Hadiyya
- Phonology of Ethiopian languages
- The Principled Grammar of Amharic Verb Stems
- The Role of SPCs in Natural Generative Phonology
- Why Amharic is not a VSO language
- Cushitic Lexicon and Phonology. ed. Grover Hudson. (Schriften zur Afrikanistik / Research in African Studies, 28). Berlin: Peter Lang. ISBN 978-3-631-60089-4
