= Western Omo–Tana languages =

Western Omo–Tana
- Omo–Tana; Arboroid
- Geographic distribution: Ethiopia, Kenya
- Linguistic classification: Afro-Asiatic: Cushitic; Lowland East; Omo–Tana?; Western Omo–Tana
- Subdivisions: Arbore; Daasanach; El Molo; Yaaku

Language codes
- Glottolog: west2723

The (Western) Omo–Tana or Arboroid languages belong to the Afro-Asiatic family and are spoken in Ethiopia and Kenya.

The languages are:

- Arbore
- Daasanach
- El Molo
- Yaaku

The first three have long been recognized as related; Bender (2020) adds Yaaku, whose classification had been obscure. The El Molo language of Kenya is nearly extinct.
