= Cushitic languages =

Branch of Afroasiatic native to East Africa

Cushitic
- Geographic distribution: Egypt, Sudan, Horn of Africa, East Africa
- Ethnicity: Cushites
- Native speakers: c. 85 million
- Linguistic classification: Afro-Asiatic: Cushitic
- Proto-language: Proto-Cushitic
- Subdivisions: North; Central; East; South; ? Dahalo

Language codes
- ISO 639-2 / 5: cus
- Glottolog: cush1243
- Distribution of the Cushitic languages in Africa

- Map of the Cushitic languages

The Cushitic languages are a branch of the Afroasiatic language family. They are spoken primarily in the Horn of Africa, with minorities speaking Cushitic languages to the north in Egypt and Sudan, and to the south in Kenya and Tanzania. As of 2012, the Cushitic languages with over one million speakers were Oromo, Somali, Beja, Afar, Hadiyya, Kambaata, and Sidama.

== Official status ==
The Cushitic languages with the greatest number of total speakers are Oromo (45.5 million), Somali (24 million), Sidama (4.9 million), Beja (2.76 million), and Afar (2.6 million).

Oromo serves as one of the official working languages of Ethiopia and is also the working language of several of the states within the Ethiopian federal system including Oromia, Harari and Dire Dawa regional states and of the Oromia Zone in the Amhara Region.

Somali is the first of two official languages of Somalia and three official languages of Somaliland. It also serves as a language of instruction in Djibouti, and as the working language of the Somali Region in Ethiopia.

Beja, Afar, Blin and Saho, the languages of the Cushitic branch of Afroasiatic that are spoken in Eritrea, are languages of instruction in the Eritrean elementary school curriculum. The constitution of Eritrea also recognizes the equality of all natively spoken languages. Additionally, Afar is a language of instruction in Djibouti, as well as the working language of the Afar Region in Ethiopia.

== Origin and prehistory ==
Christopher Ehret argues for a unified Proto-Cushitic language in the Red Sea Hills as far back as the Early Holocene. The expansion of Cushitic languages of the Southern Cushitic branch into the Rift Valley is associated with the Savanna Pastoral Neolithic.

== Typological characteristics ==
=== Phonology ===
Most Cushitic languages have a simple five-vowel system with phonemic length (/a a: e e: i i: o o: u u:/); a notable exception are the Agaw languages, which do not contrast vowel length, but have one or two additional central vowels. The consonant inventory of many Cushitic languages includes glottalic consonants, e.g. in Oromo, which has the ejectives /pʼ tʼ tʃʼ kʼ/ and the implosive /ᶑ/. Less common are pharyngeal consonants /ħ ʕ/, which appear e.g. in Somali, the Saho–Afar languages and Iraqw.

Most Cushitic languages have a system of restrictive tone also known as "pitch accent" in which tonal contours overlaid on the stressed syllable play a prominent role in morphology and syntax.

=== Grammar ===
==== Nouns ====
Nouns are inflected for case and number. All nouns are further grouped into two gender categories, masculine gender and feminine gender. In many languages, gender is overtly marked directly on the noun (e.g. in Awngi, where all feminine nouns carry the suffix -a).

The case system of many Cushitic languages is characterized by marked nominative alignment, which is typologically quite rare and predominantly found in languages of Africa. In marked nominative languages, the noun appears in unmarked "absolutive" case when cited in isolation, or when used as predicative noun and as object of a transitive verb; on the other hand, it is explicitly marked for nominative case when it functions as subject in a transitive or intransitive sentence.

Possession is usually expressed by genitive case marking of the possessor. South Cushitic—which has no case marking for subject and object—follows the opposite strategy: here, the possessed noun is marked for construct case, e.g. Iraqw afé-r mar'i "doors" (lit. "mouths of houses"), where afee "mouth" is marked for construct case.

Most nouns are by default unmarked for number, but can be explicitly marked for singular ("singulative") and plural number. E.g. in Bilin, dəmmu "cat(s)" is number-neutral, from which singular dəmmura "a single cat" and plural dəmmut "several cats" can be formed. Plural formation is very diverse, and employs ablaut (i.e. changes of root vowels or consonants), suffixes and reduplication.

==== Verbs ====
Verbs are inflected for person/number and tense/aspect. Many languages also have a special form of the verb in negative clauses.

Most Cushitic languages distinguish seven person/number categories: first, second, third person, singular and plural number, with a masculine/feminine gender distinction in third person singular. The most common conjugation type employs suffixes. Some languages also have a prefix conjugation: in Beja and the Saho–Afar languages, the prefix conjugation is still a productive part of the verb paradigm, whereas in most other languages, e.g. Somali, it is restricted to only a few verbs. It is generally assumed that historically, the suffix conjugation developed from the older prefix conjugation, by combining the verb stem with a suffixed auxiliary verb. The following table gives an example for the suffix and prefix conjugations in affirmative present tense in Somali.

			suffix conjugation	prefix conjugation
			"bring"	"come"
1st person	singular		keen-aa	i-maadd-aa
1st person	plural		keen-naa	ni-maad-naa
2nd person	singular		keen-taa	ti-maadd-aa
2nd person	plural		keen-taan	ti-maadd-aan
3rd person	singular	masc.	keen-aa	yi-maadd-aa
3rd person	singular	fem.	keen-taa	ti-maadd-aa
3rd person	plural		keen-aan	yi-maadd-aan

==== Syntax ====
Basic word order is verb final, the most common order being subject–object–verb (SOV). The subject or object can also follow the verb to indicate focus.

== Classification ==
=== Overview ===
The phylum was first designated as Cushitic in 1858. Traditionally, Cushitic has been divided into North Cushitic (consisting solely of Beja), Central Cushitic (the Agaw languages), and the large East Cushitic group. Greenberg (1950) argued for the inclusion of the South Cushitic group. The Omotic languages, once classified as West Cushitic, have almost universally been reclassified as a separate branch of Afroasiatic.

- Cushitic
  - North Cushitic (Beja)
  - Central Cushitic (Agaw)
  - East Cushitic
  - South Cushitic

This classification has not been without contention. For example, it has been argued that Southern Cushitic belongs in the Eastern branch, with its divergence explained by contact with Hadza- and Sandawe-like languages. Hetzron (1980) and Fleming (post-1981) exclude Beja altogether, though this is rejected by other linguists. Some of the classifications that have been proposed over the years are summarized here:

Other subclassifications of Cushitic
Greenberg (1963)	Hetzron (1980)	Orel & Stolbova (1995)	Ehret (2011)
Cushitic; Northern Cushitic (Beja); Central Cushitic; Eastern Cushitic; Western Cushitic (Omotic); Southern Cushitic	Beja (not part of Cushitic); Cushitic; Highland; Rift Valley (= Highland East Cushitic); Agaw; Lowland; Saho–Afar; Southern; Omo-Tana; Oromoid; Dullay; Yaaku; Iraqw (i.e. Southern Cushitic)	Cushitic; Omotic; Beja; Agaw; Sidamic (i.e. Highland East Cushitic); East Lowlands; Rift (Southern)	Cushitic; North Cushitic (Beja); Agäw–East–South Cushitic; Agäw; East–South Cushitic; Eastern Cushitic; Southern Cushitic

For debate on the placement of the Cushitic branch within Afroasiatic, see Afroasiatic languages.

=== Beja ===
Beja constitutes the only member of the Northern Cushitic subgroup. As such, Beja contains a number of linguistic innovations that are unique to it, as is also the situation with the other subgroups of Cushitic (e.g. idiosyncratic features in Agaw or Central Cushitic). Hetzron (1980) argues that Beja therefore may comprise an independent branch of the Afroasiatic family. However, this suggestion has been rejected by most other scholars. The characteristics of Beja that differ from those of other Cushitic languages are instead generally acknowledged as normal branch variation.

Didier Morin (2001) assigned Beja to Lowland East Cushitic on the grounds that the language shared lexical and phonological features with the Afar and Saho idioms, and also because the languages were historically spoken in adjacent speech areas. However, among linguists specializing in the Cushitic languages, the standard classification of Beja as North Cushitic is accepted.

Blemmyan, an early form of Beja – mostly attested through onomastic evidence, but also directly by a small text on an ostracon from Saqqara – was spoken by the Blemmyes, an ancient people of Lower Nubia that appears in the Egyptian historical records from the 6th century BCE onwards. It is also likely that the Medjay spoke a language that was ancestral to Beja.

=== Omotic ===
Cushitic was formerly seen as also including most or all of the Omotic languages. An early view by Enrico Cerulli proposed a "Sidama" subgroup comprising most of the Omotic languages and the Sidamic group of Highland East Cushitic. Mario Martino Moreno in 1940 divided Cerulli's Sidama, uniting the Sidamic proper and the Lowland Cushitic languages as East Cushitic, the remainder as West Cushitic or ta/ne Cushitic. The Aroid languages were not considered Cushitic by either scholar (thought by Cerulli to be instead Nilotic); they were added to West Cushitic by Joseph Greenberg in 1963. Further work in the 1960s soon led to the putative West Cushitic being seen as typologically divergent and renamed as "Omotic".

Today the inclusion of Omotic as a part of Cushitic has been abandoned. Omotic is most often seen as an independent branch of Afroasiatic, primarily due to the work of Harold C. Fleming (1974) and Lionel Bender (1975); some linguists like Paul Newman (1980) challenge Omotic's classification within the Afroasiatic family itself.

=== Other divergent languages ===
There are also a few languages of uncertain classification, including Yaaku, Dahalo, Aasax, Kw'adza, Boon, Ongota and the Cushitic component of Mbugu (Ma'a). There is a wide range of opinions as to how the languages are interrelated.

The positions of the Dullay languages and of Yaaku are uncertain. They have traditionally been assigned to an East Cushitic subbranch along with Highland (Sidamic) and Lowland East Cushitic. However, Hayward thinks that East Cushitic may not be a valid node and that its constituents should be considered separately when attempting to work out the internal relationships of Cushitic. Bender (2020) suggests Yaaku to be a divergent member of the Arboroid group.

The Afroasiatic identity of Ongota has also been broadly questioned, as is its position within Afroasiatic among those who accept it, because of the "mixed" appearance of the language and a paucity of research and data. Harold C. Fleming (2006) proposes that Ongota is a separate branch of Afroasiatic. Bonny Sands (2009) thinks the most convincing proposal is by Savà and Tosco (2003), namely that Ongota is an East Cushitic language with a Nilo-Saharan substratum. In other words, it would appear that the Ongota people once spoke a Nilo-Saharan language but then shifted to speaking a Cushitic language while retaining some characteristics of their earlier Nilo-Saharan language.

Hetzron (1980) and Ehret (1995) have suggested that the South Cushitic languages (Rift languages) are a part of Lowland East Cushitic, the only one of the six groups with much internal diversity.

== Hypothesized Cushitic substrate languages ==
Some of the ancient peoples of Nubia are hypothesized to have spoken languages belonging to the Cushitic group, especially the people of the C-Group culture. It has been speculated that these people left a substratum of Cushitic words in the modern Nubian languages. Given the scarcity of data (all onomastic or toponymic), however, it remains unclear if the C-Group culture in fact spoke a Cushitic language.

Christopher Ehret (1998) proposed on the basis of loanwords that South Cushitic languages (called "Tale" and "Bisha" by Ehret) were spoken in an area closer to Lake Victoria than are found today, and that these people were ancestral to today linguistically integrated groups like the Tutsi.

Also, historically, the Southern Nilotic languages have undergone extensive contact with a "missing" branch of East Cushitic that Heine (1979) refers to as Baz. Mous and Rapold (2025) instead attribute these loans to various stages of other, already attested Cushitic languages.

== Reconstruction ==
Christopher Ehret proposed a reconstruction of Proto-Cushitic in 1987, but did not base this on individual branch reconstructions. Grover Hudson (1989) has done some preliminary work on Highland East Cushitic, David Appleyard (2006) has proposed a reconstruction of Proto-Agaw, and Roland Kießling and Maarten Mous (2003) have jointly proposed a reconstruction of West Rift Southern Cushitic. No reconstruction has been published for Lowland East Cushitic, though Paul D. Black wrote his (unpublished) dissertation on the topic in 1974. Hans-Jürgen Sasse (1979) proposed a reconstruction of the consonants of Proto-East Cushitic. No comparative work has yet brought these branch reconstructions together.

== Comparative vocabulary ==
=== Basic vocabulary ===
Sample basic vocabulary of Cushitic languages from Vossen & Dimmendaal (2020:318) (with PSC denoting Proto-Southern Cushitic):

Branch	Northern	Southern	Eastern		Central	
Gloss	Beja	Iraqw	Oromo	Somali	Awŋi	Kemantney
'foot'	ragad/lagad	yaaee	miila/luka	lug	lɨk^{w}	lɨk^{w}
'tooth'	kwire	siħinoo	ilkee	ilig	ɨrk^{w}í	ɨrk^{w}
'hair'	hami/d.ifi	seʔeengw	dabbasaa	timo	ʧiʧifí	ʃibka
'heart'	gin'a	muuná	onnee	wadne	ɨʃew	lɨbäka
'house'	gau/'anda	doʔ	mana	guri/min	ŋɨn	nɨŋ
'wood'	hindi	ɬupi	mukha	qori/alwaax	kani	kana
'meat'	ʃa/dof	fuʔnaay	foon	so'/hilib	ɨʃʃi	sɨya
'water'	yam	maʔay	biʃan	biyo/maayo	aɣu	ax^{w}
'door'	ɖefa/yaf	piindo	balbala	irrid/albaab	lɨmʧi/sank	bäla
'grass'	siyam/ʃuʃ	gitsoo	ʧ'itaa	caws	sig^{w}i	ʃanka
'black'	hadal/hadod	boo	gurraʧʧa	madow	ʧárkí	ʃämäna
'red'	adal/adar	daaʕaat	diimaa	cas/guduud	dɨmmí	säraɣ
'road'	darab	loohi	karaa/godaana	jid/waddo	dad	gorwa
'mountain'	reba	tɬooma	tuullu	buur	kán	dɨba
'spear'	fena/gwiʃ'a	*laabala (PSC)	waraana	waran	werém	ʃämärgina
'stick' (n)	'amis/'adi	*ħada	ulee/dullaa	ul	gɨmb	kɨnbɨ
'fire'	n'e	ʔaɬa	ibidda	dab	leg	wɨzɨŋ
'donkey'	mek	daqwaay	haare	dameer	dɨɣ^{w}arí	dɨɣora
'cat'	bissa/kaffa	maytsí	adure	bisad/Mukulaal/yaanyuur	anguʧʧa	damiya
'dog'	yas/mani	seeaay	seere	eey	gɨséŋ	gɨzɨŋ
'cow'	ʃ'a/yiwe	ɬee	sa'a	sac	ɨllwa	käma
'lion'	hada	diraangw	lenʧ'a	libaax	wuʤi	gämäna
'hyena'	galaba/karai	*bahaa (PSC)	waraabo	waraabe	ɨɣ^{w}í	wäya
'sister'	kwa	ħoʔoo	obboleeytii	walaalo/abbaayo	séná	ʃän
'brother'	san	nana	obboleessa	walaal/abboowe	sén	zän
'mother'	de	aayi	haaɗa	hooyo	ʧwá	gäna
'father'	baba	taata	aabba	aabbe	tablí	aba
'sit'	s'a/ʈaʈam	iwiit	taa'uu	fadhiiso	ɨnʤik^{w}-	täkosɨm-
'sleep'	diw/nari	guuʔ	rafuu	hurud	ɣur\y-	gänʤ-
'eat'	tam/'am	aag	ɲaaʧʧu	cun	ɣ^{w}-	x^{w}-
'drink'	gw'a/ʃifi	wah	ɗugaaiti	cab	zɨq-	ʤax-
'kill'	dir	gaas	aʤʤeesuu	dil	k^{w}-	k^{w}-
'speak'	hadid/kwinh	ʔooʔ	dubbattu	hadal	dibs-	gämär-
'thin'	'iyai/bilil	*ʔiiraw (PSC)	hap'ii	caato	ɨnʧu	k'ät'än-
'fat'	dah/l'a	*du/*iya (PSC)	furdaa	buuran	morí	wäfär-
'small'	dis/dabali	*niinaw (PSC)	t'innoo	yar	ʧɨlí	ʃig^{w}ey
'big'	win/ragaga	*dir (PSC)	guddaa/dagaaga	weyn	dɨngulí	fɨraq

=== Numerals ===
Comparison of numerals in individual Cushitic languages:

Classification	Language	1	2	3	4	5	6	7	8	9	10
North	Beja (Bedawi)	ɡaːl	ˈmale	mheːj	ˈfaɖiɡ	eːj (lit: 'hand')	aˈsaɡ^{w}ir (5 + 1)	asaːˈrama (5 + 2)	asiˈmheːj (5 + 3)	aʃˈʃaɖiɡ (5 + 4)	ˈtamin
Central	Bilin (Bilen)	lax^{w} / la	ləŋa	səx^{w}a	sədʒa	ʔank^{w}a	wəlta	ləŋəta	səx^{w}əta	səssa	ʃɨka
Central, Eastern	Xamtanga	lə́w	líŋa	ʃáq^{w}a	síza	ák^{w}a	wálta	láŋta / lánta	sə́wta	sʼájtʃʼa	sʼɨ́kʼa
Central, Southern	Awngi	ɨ́mpɨ́l / láɢú	láŋa	ʃúɢa	sedza	áŋk^{w}a	wɨ́lta	láŋéta	sóɢéta	sésta	tsɨ́kka
Central, Western	Kimant (Qimant)	laɣa / la	liŋa	siɣ^{w}a	sədʒa	ank^{w}a	wəlta	ləŋəta	səɣ^{w}əta	səssa	ʃɨka
East, Highland	Alaaba	matú	lamú	sasú	ʃɔːlú	ʔɔntú	lehú	lamalá	hizzeːtú	hɔnsú	tɔnnsú
East, Highland	Burji	mitʃːa	lama	fadia	foola	umutta	lia	lamala	hiditta	wonfa	tanna
East, Highland	Gedeo	mitte	lame	sase	ʃoole	onde	dʒaane	torbaane	saddeeta	sallane	tomme
East, Highland	Hadiyya	mato	lamo	saso	sooro	onto	loho	lamara	sadeento	honso	tommo
East, Highland	Kambaata	máto	lámo	sáso	ʃóolo	ónto	lého	lamála	hezzéeto	hónso	tordúma
East, Highland	Libido	mato	lamo	saso	sooro	ʔonto	leho	lamara	sadeento	honso	tommo
East, Highland	Sidama	mite	lame	sase	ʃoole	onte	lee	lamala	sette	honse	tonne
East, Dullay	Gawwada	tóʔon	lákke	ízzaħ	sálaħ	xúpin	tappi	táʔan	sétten	kóllan	ħúɗɗan
East, Dullay	Tsamai (Ts'amakko)	doːkːo	laːkːi	zeːħ	salaħ	χobin	tabːen	taħːan	sezːen	ɡolːan	kuŋko
East, Konsoid	Bussa (Harso-Bobase)	tóʔo	lakki, lam(m)e, lamay	ezzaħ, siséħ	salaħ	xúpin	cappi	caħħan	sásse /sésse	kollan	húddʼan
East, Konsoid	Dirasha (Gidole)	ʃakka(ha) (fem.) / ʃokko(ha) (masc.)	lakki	halpatta	afur	hen	lehi	tappa	lakkuʃeti	tsinqoota	hunda
East, Konsoid	Konso	takka	lakki	sessa	afur	ken	lehi	tappa	sette	saɡal	kuɗan
East, Oromo	Orma	tokkō	lamā	sadi	afurī	ʃanī	dʒa	torbā	saddeetī	saɡalī	kuɗenī
East, Oromo	West Central Oromo	tokko	lama	sadii	afur	ʃani	dʒaha	torba	saddet	saɡal	kuɗan
East, Saho-Afar	Afar	enèki / inìki	nammàya	sidòħu / sidòħoòyu	ferèyi / fereèyi	konòyu / konoòyu	leħèyi / leħeèyi	malħiini	baħaàra	saɡaàla	tàbana
East, Saho-Afar	Saho	inik	lam:a	adoħ	afar	ko:n	liħ	malħin	baħar	saɡal	taman
East, Rendille-Boni	Boni	kóów, hál-ó (masc.) / hás-só (fem)	lába	síddéh	áfar	ʃan	líh	toddóu	siyyéèd	saaɡal	tammán
East, Rendille-Boni	Rendille	kôːw / ko:kalɖay (isolated form)	lámːa	sɛ́jːaħ	áfːar	t͡ʃán	líħ	tɛːbá	sijːɛ̂ːt	saːɡáːl	tomón
East, Somali	Garre (Karre)	kow	lamma	siddeh	afar	ʃan	liʔ	toddobe	siyeed	saɡaal	tommon
East, Somali	Somali	ków	labá	sáddex	áfar	shán	lix	toddobá	sideed	sagaal	toban
East, Somali	Tunni (Af-Tunni)	ków	lámma	síddiʔ	áfar	ʃán	líʔ	toddóbo	siyéed	saɡáal	tómon
East, Arboroid	Arbore	tokkó (masc.) / takká (fem.), ˈtaˈka	laamá, ˈlaːma	sezzé, ˈsɛːze	ʔafúr, ʔaˈfur	tʃénn, t͡ʃɛn	dʒih, ˈd͡ʒi	tuzba, ˈtuːzba	suyé, suˈjɛ	saaɡalɗ, ˈsaɡal	tommoɲɗ, ˈtɔmːɔn
East, Arboroid	Bayso (Baiso)	koo (masc.) too (fem.)	lɑ́ɑmɑ	sédi	ɑ́fɑr	ken	le	todobɑ́	siddéd	sɑ́ɑɡɑɑl	tómon
East, Arboroid	Daasanach	tɪ̀ɡɪ̀ɗɪ̀ (adj.) / tàqàt͡ʃ ̚ (ord.)/ ʔɛ̀ɾ (ord.)	nàːmə̀	sɛ̀d̪ɛ̀	ʔàfʊ̀ɾ	t͡ʃɛ̀n	lɪ̀^{h}	t̪ɪ̀ːjə̀	síɪ̀t̚	sàːl	t̪òmòn
East, Arboroid	El Molo	t'óko / t'áka	l'ááma	séépe	áfur	kên, cên	yíi	tíípa, s'ápa	fúe	s'áákal	t'ómon
South or East	Dahalo	vattúk^{w}e (masc.) / vatték^{w}e (fem.)	líima	kʼaba	saʕála	dáwàtte, possibly ← 'hand'	sita < Swahili	saba < Swahili	nane	kenda / tis(i)a	kumi
South	Alagwa (Wasi)	wák	ndʒad	tam	tsʼiɡaħ	kooʔan	laħooʔ	faanqʼw	dakat	ɡwelen	mib^{i}
South	Burunge	leyiŋ / leẽ	t͡ʃʼada	tami	t͡ʃʼiɡaħa	koːʔani	laħaʔu	faɴqʼu	daɡati	ɡweleli	mili
South	Gorowa (Gorwaa)	wak	tsʼar	tám	tsʼiyáħ	kooʔán	laħóoʔ	fâanqʼw	dakáat	ɡwaléel / ɡweléel	mibaanɡw
South	Iraqw	wák	tsár	tám	tsíyáħ	kooán	laħoóʔ	faaɴw	dakaát	ɡwaleél	mibaaɴw

== See also ==
- Cushitic-speaking peoples
- List of Proto-Cushitic reconstructions (Wiktionary)
- Meroitic language
