= Aweer language =

Lowland East Cushitic language of eastern Kenya

Aweer
- Boni
- Native to: Kenya
- Region: Coast Province, North-Eastern Province
- Ethnicity: Aweer
- Native speakers: 7,600 (2009 census)
- Language family: Afro-Asiatic: Cushitic; Lowland East; Rendille–Boni; Aweer
- Dialects: Kilii; Baddey; Bireeri; Jara; Kijee; Safaree
- Writing system: Latin

Language codes
- ISO 639-3: bob
- Glottolog: awee1242
- ELP: Aweer
- Linguasphere: 14-GAF-a
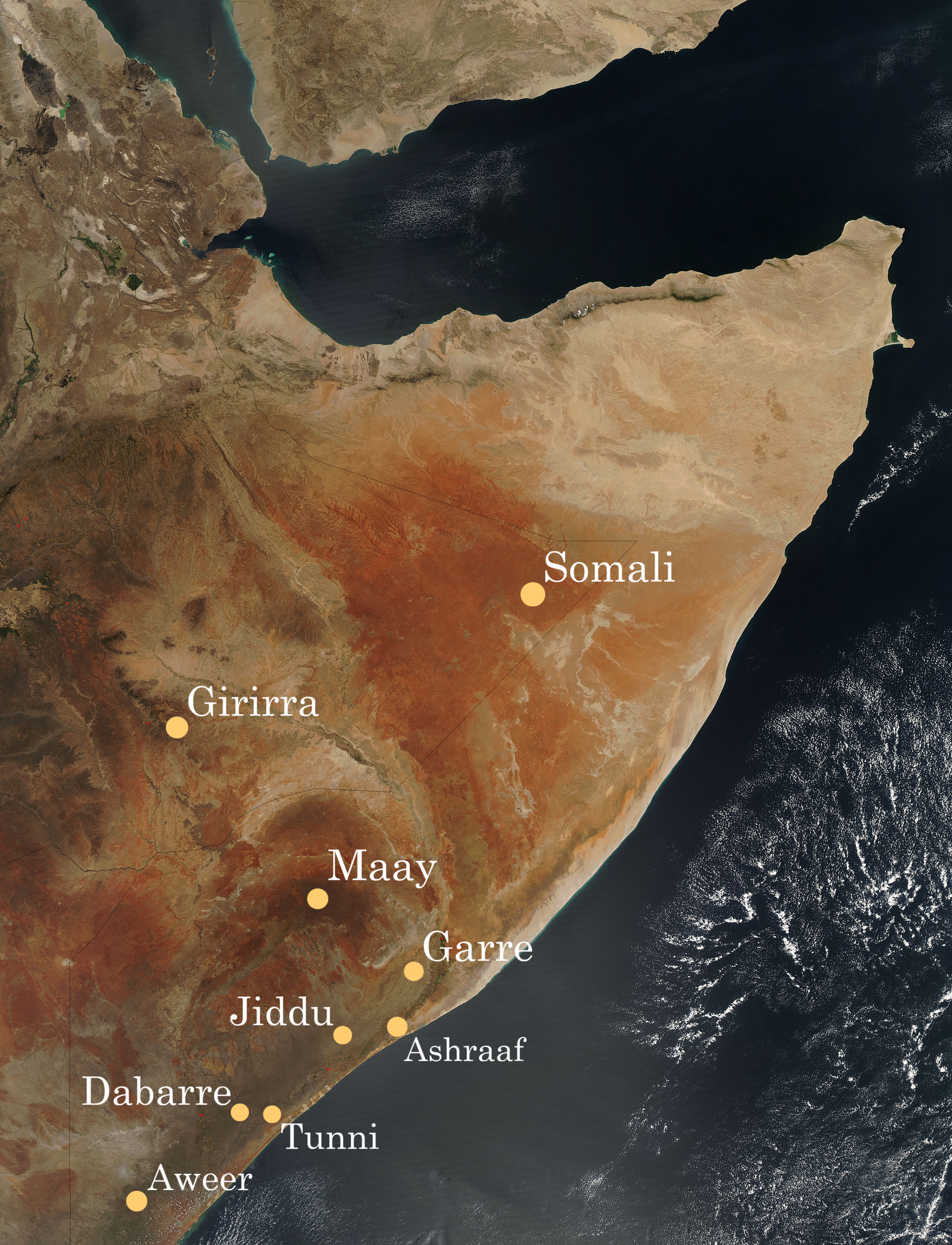
- Area where the Eastern Omo-Tana languages (minus Bayso and Rendille) are spoken

Aweer (Aweera), also known as Boni (Bon, Bonta), is a Cushitic language of Eastern Kenya. The Aweer people, known by the arguably derogatory exonym Boni, are historically a hunter-gatherer people, traditionally subsisting on hunting, gathering, and collecting honey. Their ancestral lands range along the Kenyan coast from the Lamu and Ijara Districts into Southern Somalia's Badaade District.

According to Ethnologue, there are around 8,000 speakers of Aweer. Aweer has similarities with the Garre language, however, its speakers are distinct in culture and appearance from Garre speakers.

== Historical situation ==
There are suggestions that the Aweer speech community are remnants of the early hunter-gatherer inhabitants of Eastern Africa, although this is not without debate among specialists and unlike the neighboring speakers of the Dahalo language, there is no concrete linguistic evidence of a shift from a prior language; it is best said that the possibility of said shift is more so based on assumptions regarding their status as foragers as opposed to linguistic evidence of the same sort found in neighboring languages. As noted in Heine (1982:141), the debate regarding the situation of if the Aweer have or have not shifted from a prior language is as follows:

1. The forest was inhabited by people speaking a non-Sam (= non-Eastern Omo–Tana) language, who, as a result of contacts with Sam pastoralists along the forest fringes, adopted a Sam language. This would imply that the Boni relationship with the Sam people is merely linguistic; their cultural origin would have to be sought with those hunter-gatherers who lived in the forest prior to the arrival of the Eastern Sam.
2. Part of the Eastern Sam, i.e. the immediate ancestors of the Boni, entered the coastal forest and adopted a hunter-gatherer existence. Such a development is likely to have been caused by war, stock raiding or ecological distress, forcing the Same people to give up their livestock economy.

Tosco (1994) notes that Heine agrees with the second historical scenario, and as Tosco (1994:155) goes on to state:

I suppose that the "backwardness" of the cultural and economic way of life of the hunter-gatherers is probably at the very core of these theories: notwithstanding the dangers implicit in any strong association between culture and language, these people are assumed to be "linguistic survivors", because they are—presumably—"cultural survivors". These theories do not take into account that language shift is probably a much more recurrent phenomenon than any romantic association between people and culture leads us to assume.

Further on in the same paper, Tosco does note that there are oral traditions among the Aweer ethnic community that they had at one point had cattle and, as a result of losing them (and presumably their social status), had become foragers. A similar view can be found in Stiles (1988:41-42), and the general consensus is that while the actual origin of the Aweer and their language is not known definitively, it is likely that they at one point were not foragers. A competing hypothesis, and perhaps equally plausible one in the same vein as Heine's first scenario, is put forth by Tosco (1994:159) that links the emergence of Aweer to the expansion of Garre-speakers from the northeast:

According to Garre traditions, the movement began "from an area located at or near the present-day settlement of Luuq, down the right side of the Jubba river. The expansion took the form of sections of the Garre communities spreading from Afmadow southwards until they reached the Jubba-Tana region, where they "coexisted with Dahaloan hunter-gatherers"; their "impact led the Dahaloan food collectors to give up their Dahaloan tongue for Garre. To this day the Aweer ... speak dialects of Garre. All that remains of their Dahaloan speech is a single community near the coast ..., even the lexicon has been influenced by Garre" (Ali 1985:161ff). Thus, for Ali the Boni are Dahalo that have been Somalised, just as many centuries before these hunter-gatherers had given up their original (?) Khoisan language and adopted a Cushitic language, i.e. Dahalo.

He then notes that in a forthcoming work to be published, Tosco (1992), that there are loans of East Omo-Tana (or in his words, "Somali") origin within Dahalo that could have only been loaned by either Aweer or Garre, such as the verb šir- (IPA: [ʃir-]) 'to be there, to exist' which demonstrates the sound change *k > [ʃ] /_i and the verb unneed- (IPA: [ʔunneːd]) 'to swallow', which demonstrates another sound shift found in both Garre and Aweer, *ʕ > [ʔ] along with the semantic shift of 'to eat' > 'to swallow'; which itself is found in Aweer. Conversely, these could also be loans from Aweer into Dahalo. A similar viewpoint can be found in Nurse (2019).

== Phonology ==
The phonemic inventory reconstructed for Proto-Aweer (the last common stage of all Aweer dialects) is as follows:

Consonants
		Labial	Dental/ Alveolar	Palato- (alveolar)	Velar	Uvular	Glottal
Nasal		m	n	ɲ			
Plosive	voiceless	p	t	c	k	q	ʔ
Plosive	voiced	b	d	ɟ	g		
Plosive	ejective		tʼ	cʼ	kʼ		
Plosive	implosive		ɗ	ʄ	ɠ		
Fricative		f	s	ʃ			h
Approximant			l	j	w		
Rhotic			r, r̪				
