= Daasanach language =

Lowland East Cushitic language of East Africa

Daasanach
- Af Daasanach, ’Daasanach
- Native to: Ethiopia, Kenya, South Sudan
- Region: Lower Omo River, Lake Turkana
- Ethnicity: Daasanach
- Native speakers: 71,000 (2007–2019)
- Language family: Afro-Asiatic: Cushitic; East; Lowland East; Western Omo–Tana; Daasanach
- Writing system: Latin

Language codes
- ISO 639-3: dsh
- Glottolog: daas1238
- ELP: Daasanach

Daasanach (also known as Dasenech, Daasanech, Dathanaik, Dathanaic, Dathanik, Dhaasanac, Gheleba, Geleba, Geleb, Gelebinya, Gallab, Galuba, Gelab, Gelubba, Dama, Marille, Merile, Merille, Morille, Reshiat, Russia) is a Cushitic language spoken by the Daasanach in Ethiopia, South Sudan and Kenya whose homeland is along the Lower Omo River and on the shores of Lake Turkana.

== Phonology ==
=== Consonants ===
		Labial	Dental/ Alveolar	Post- alveolar	Palatal	Velar	Glottal
Plosive	plain	b	t̪ d̪		c ɟ	k ɡ	ʔ
Plosive	implosive	ɓ		ɗ̠	ʄ	ɠ	
Fricative	central	f (v)	ð				(h)
Fricative	sibilant		s (z)	ʃ			
Nasal		m	n		ɲ	ŋ	
Trill			r				
Lateral			l				
Approximant		w			j		

- A glottal [h] may also occur in word-initial position, when preceding vowels in various positions
- /ð/ may freely alternate with an alveolar [z] among speakers.
- /w/ may be heard as a fricative [v] when before front vowels.
- Sounds /t̪, k/ can be heard as spiranted [ð, ɣ] in intervocalic positions. /k/ can also be heard as uvular [χ] when in between back vowel sounds.
- /k/ can be heard as a uvular [q] when before back vowel sounds.
- /ɗ̠/ in intervocalic positions can be deglottalized, and heard as either retroflex sounds [ɖ] or [ɽ].

=== Vowels ===
	Front	Central	Back
Close	ɪ iː		ʊ uː
Mid	ɛ ɛː		ɔ ɔː
Open		a aː	

== Writing system ==
Jim Ness and Susan Ness of Bible Translation and Literacy and Wycliffe Bible Translators devised a practical spelling and published a 1995 alphabet book. Yergalech Komoi and Gosh Kwanyangʼ published another alphabet book in 1995. An edition of the Gospel of Mark was published in 1997, and other Bible translations were published with this spelling in 1999. The alphabet was later revised, with the digraph ⟨dh⟩ replaced by a bowl-struck đ (approximately ⟨d̶⟩).

Daasanach alphabet
Letters	ʼ	a	b	ʼb	ch	d	ʼd	đ	e	f	g	ʼg	h	i	ʼj	k	l	m	n	ngʼ	ny	o	r	s	sh	t	u	v	w	y
Pronunciation	ʔ	a	b	ɓ	c	d	ɗ	ð	e	f	g	ɠ	h	i	ɟ	k	l	m	n	ŋ	ɲ	o	r	s	ʃ	t	u	v	w	j

Vowels can be given with the acute accent, ⟨á, é, í, ó, ú⟩, or the circumflex accent ⟨â, ê, î, ô, û⟩.
