= Languages of Somalia =

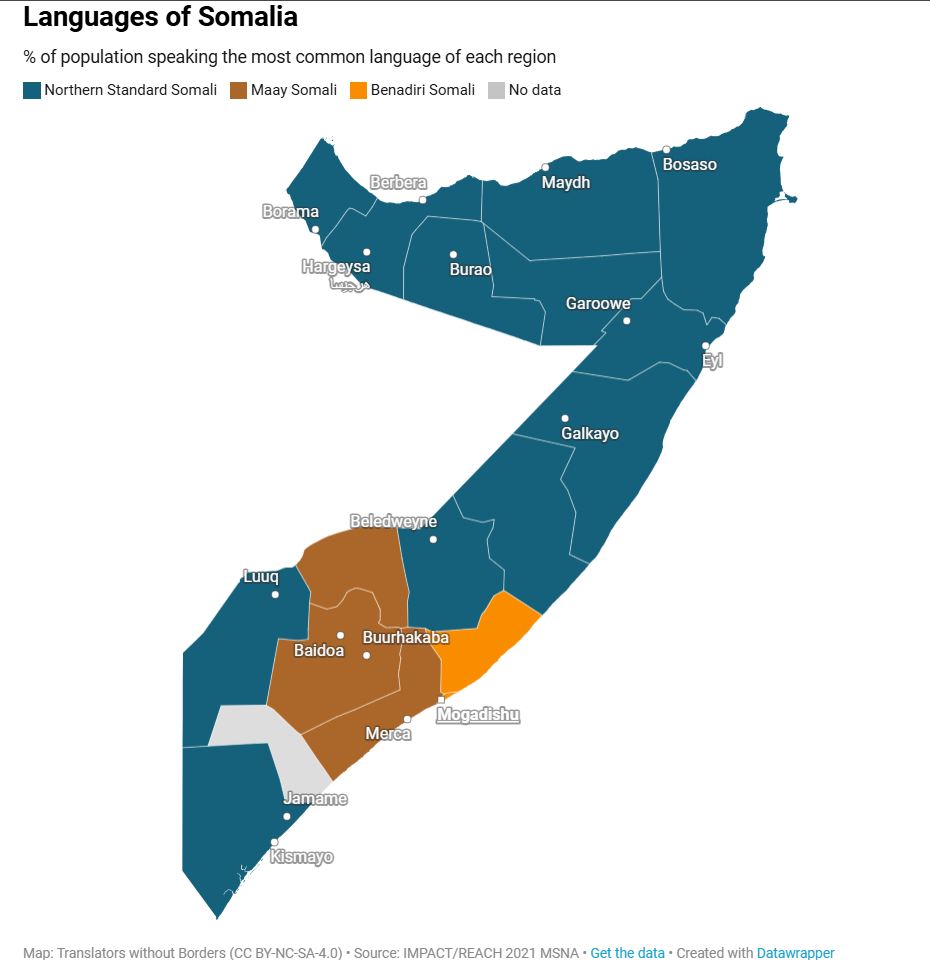
- Distribution of the Somali dialects across Somalia
- Official: Somali
- Semi-official: Arabic
- Minority: Boon, Bajuni, Bravanese, Dabarre, Garre, Jiiddu, Mushunguli and Tunni
- Immigrant: Taʽizzi-Adeni Arabic
- Foreign: English, Italian, and Swahili
- Signed: Somali Sign Language
- Keyboard layout: QWERTY

The official language of Somalia is Somali and remains the most widely spoken language in the country, with Northern Standard Somali as the most widely spoken dialect of the language, at around 60% of the population, followed by Maay Somali at 20% and Benadiri Somali at 18%.

Arabic is listed as the second language in the constitution and is used primarily in religious practice and education.

== History ==
Somali is the official language of Somalia and as the mother tongue of the Somali people, is also its endoglossic language. It is a member of the Cushitic branch of the Afro-Asiatic family. Somali is the best documented of the Cushitic languages, with academic studies of it dating from before 1900.

Speech sample in Standard Somali. Sheikh Ahmed Nur giving a speech (July 26, 2012).

As of 2006, there were approximately 16.6 million speakers of Somali, of which about 8.3 million reside in Somalia. Of the five Somali federal states, all of them solely implement the Af-Maxaa-tiri dialect, except for the South West state, which officially uses it in combination with the Af-Maay-tiri, commonly known as Maay Maay. The Somali language is spoken by ethnic Somalis in Greater Somalia and the Somali diaspora. It is spoken as an adoptive language by a few ethnic minority groups in these regions.

== Variations ==
Somali dialects are divided into three main groups: The erroneously named Northern dialect (also spoken in the south) and Benaadir are collectively known as Maxaa Tiri dialects. The third dialect spoken in Somalia is the Maay dialect (sometimes spelled Mai or Mai Mai). Northern Somali (or Maxaa Tiri Somali) forms the basis for Standard Somali. The similar Benaadir (also known as Coastal Somali) is spoken on the Benadir coast from Cadaley to south of Merca, including Mogadishu, as well as in the immediate hinterland. The coastal dialects have additional phonemes which do not exist in Standard Somali. Maay is principally spoken by the Digil and Mirifle (Rahanweyn) clans in South West.

Northern Somali (Maxaa Tiri) is the main Somali dialect spoken in the country, it is also the main Somali dialect of Djibouti.

The Somali language is regulated by the Regional Somali Language Academy, an intergovernmental institution established in June 2013 by the governments of Djibouti, Somalia and Ethiopia. It is officially mandated with preserving the Somali language.

=== Somali Sign Language ===
The Somali Sign Language (SSL) is a sign language used by the deaf community in Somalia and Djibouti. It was originally developed by a Somali man educated in a Somali deaf school in Wajir, Kenya. In 1997, he established the first school for the deaf in the city of Borama, Somalia.

=== Minorities ===
Other minority languages include Bravanese (also known as Chimwiini or Chimbalazi), a variant of the Bantu Swahili language that is spoken along the southern coast by the Bravanese people. Kibajuni is a Swahili dialect that is the mother tongue of the Bajuni ethnic minority group. Additionally, a number of Bantus speak Mushunguli as a mother tongue.

=== Vulnerable and endangered languages ===
==== Vulnerable Cushitic languages ====
- Garre language (57,500 speakers as of 1992)
- Tunni language (23,000 speakers as of 2006)

==== Endangered Cushitic languages ====
- Aweer language, also known as "Boni", Waata, Wata, Sanye, Wasanye, Waboni, Bon, Ogoda, or Wata-Bala (Less than 200 speakers)
- Boni language, also known as Af-Boon or Boni (59 speakers as of 2000).

==== Endangered Atlantic-Congo languages ====
- Mushungulu, also known as Kimushungulu or Mushunguli language (23,000 speakers as of 2006).

=== Adjacent islands ===
In 2010, Somalia claimed that the island of Socotra, wherein Soqotri is spoken, should be instilled as part of its sovereignty, arguing that the archipelago is situated nearer to the African coast than to the Arabian coast. With regards to other islands adjacent to the Somali coast, the Kibajuni is a Swahili dialect that is the mother tongue of the Bajuni ethnic group in the eponymously named islands off Jubalands coast. In this island, which is part of Jubaland, this language is spoken alongside Somali.

== Semitic languages ==
=== Arabic ===
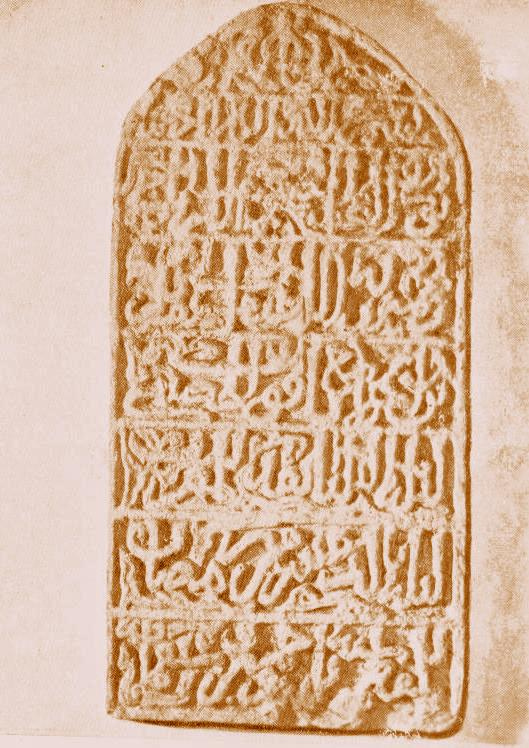
Stone tablet from the 14th century in the Wadaad orthography

Arabic is the second language in Somalia, although as a non-indigenous language, it is considered exoglossic. SIL estimates the total number of speakers, regardless of proficiency, at just over two million. It is used as a liturgical language as it is the language of Qur'an. Somalis learn to read and write Arabic from a young age with an estimated 75 percent of all children being able to read and write Arabic when they join formal schools at age six to eight years.

Even though Arabic is not the first language of Somali children, it is the first language they learn to read and write in the dugsi...which over 95 percent of children will have attended before being taken to formal school. School heads in Somalia contend that over 75 percent of all children can read and write Arabic when they join formal schools at age six to eight years.

— Lee Cassanelli and Farah Sheikh Abdikadir, Somalia: Education in Transition, C. Quranic Schools and Religious Education

Af-Somali's main lexical borrowings come from Arabic. Soravia (1994) noted a total of 1,436 Arabic loanwords in Agostini a.o. 1985, a prominent Somali dictionary. Most of the vocabulary terms consisted of commonly used nouns and a few words that Zaborski (1967:122) observed in the older literature were absent in Agostini's later work. The parallel disparity between the Arabic and Somali languages occurred despite a lengthy spell of a shared religion, as well as frequent intermingling as with through practises such as umrah. This can be attributed to each having a separate developments from the Afro-Asiatic language as well as a sea separating the speakers of the two languages. Furthermore, Mr Bruce, an 18th-century voyager of the Horn of Africa, was reported by author George Annesley to have described Somalis as an Arabophobic race which had disdain for Arabs, writing "an Arab, a nation whom they detest", which led to the preservation of Somali in those times despite proximity to the Arabian peninsula. Somalis in the neighbourhood countries (throughout "Greater Somalia") rarely speak Arabic in their day-to-day lives.

=== Soqotri ===
Due to the close distance between Somalia and Socotra, there has always been extensive relations between the two peoples particularly with the nearby region of Puntland which is the nearest mainland shore to Socotra. These interactions between Puntites and Soqotris include instances of aid during shipwrecks on either coasts, trade as well as the exchange of cultural facets and trade. These interactions have also meant that some inhabitants of localities of the nearest linear proximity such as Bereeda and Alula have become bilingual at both the Soqotri and Somali languages.

== European languages ==
=== Italian ===
Italian was the main official language in Italian Somaliland, although following its acquisition of Jubaland in 1924, the Jubaland region maintained English at a semi-official status for several years thereafter.

During the United Nations Trusteeship period from 1949 until 1960, Italian along with Somali were used at an official level internally, whilst the UN's main working language of English was the language used during diplomatic, international and occasionally for economic correspondence. After 1960 independence, the Italian remained official for another nine years. Italian was later declared an official language again by the Transitional Federal Government along with English in 2004. But, in 2012, they were later removed by the establishments of the Provisional Constitution by the Federal Government of Somalia leaving Somali and Arabic as the only official languages.

Italian is a legacy of the Italian colonial period of Somalia when it was part of the Italian Empire. Italian was the mother tongue of the Italian settlers of Somalia.

Although it was the primary language since colonial rule, Italian continued to be used among the country's ruling elite even after 1960 independence when it continued to remain as an official language. It is estimated that more than 200,000 native Somalis (nearly 20% of the total population of former Somalia italiana) were fluent speaking Italian when independence was declared in 1960.

After a military coup in 1969, all foreign entities were nationalized by president Siad Barre (who spoke Italian fluently), including Mogadishu under Italian rule's principal university, which was renamed 'Jaamacadda Ummadda Soomaliyeed' (Somali National University). This marked the initial decline of the use of Italian in Somalia.

However, Italian is still widely spoken by the elderly, the educated, and by the governmental officials of Somalia. Prior to the Somali civil war, Mogadishu still had an Italian-language school, but was later destroyed by the conflict.

Furthermore it is noteworthy to pinpoint that in the "Somalia italiana" was developed a local pidgin from the Italian language: the Italian Pidgin of Somalia. It was used by nearly 2/3 of the native population in 1940, according to historian Epifanio Ajello.

=== English ===
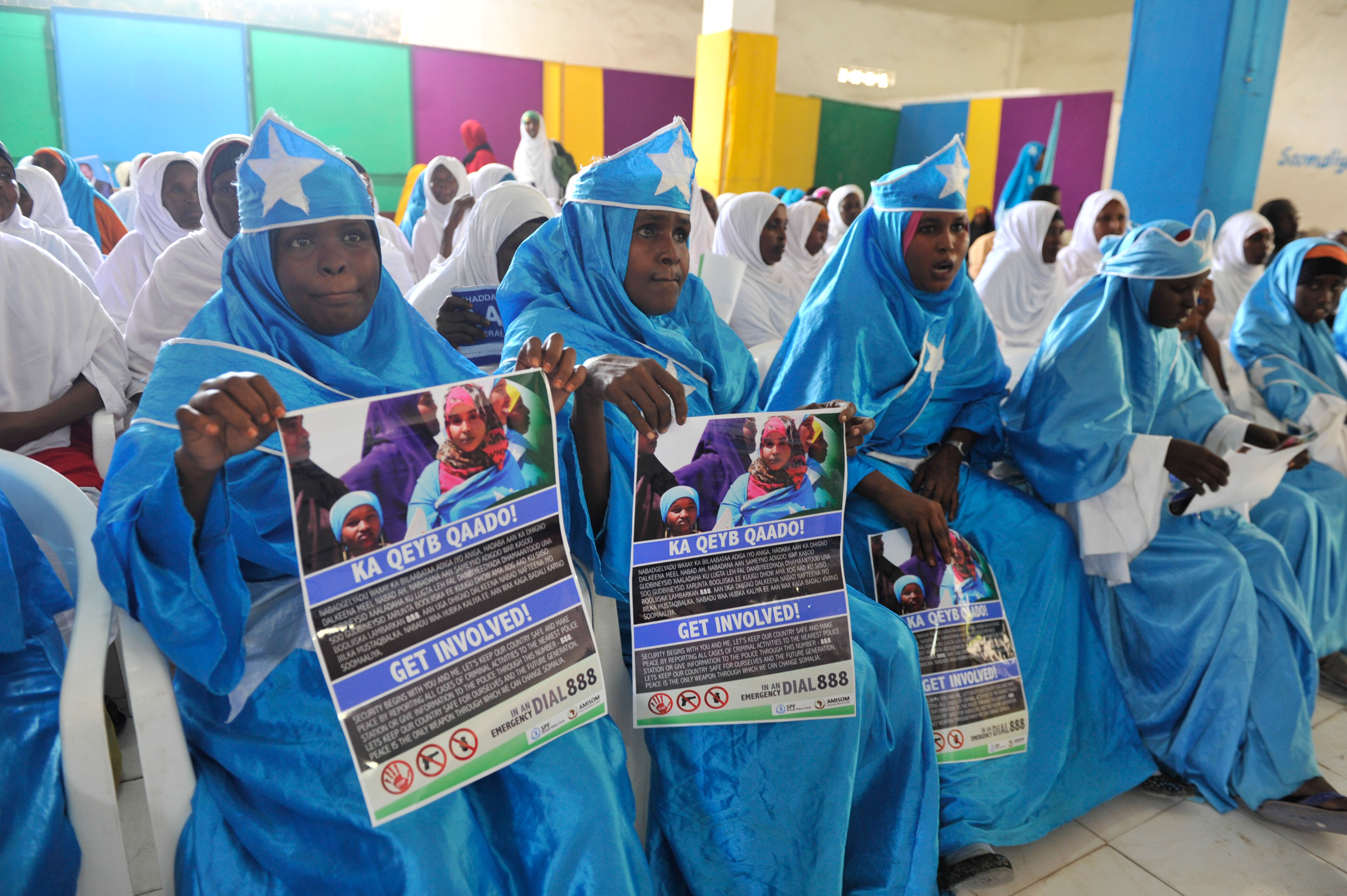
Women in Karan District with informational signs in Somali and English

English is widely taught in schools. It used to be a working language in British Somaliland in the north of the country. It was also in usage during the British Military Administration, whereby Britain controlled most Somali-inhabited areas from 1941 until 1949. Outside of the north, the Jubaland region has had the lengthiest period with English as an official language as the British empire began administering the area in the 1880s. As such, English had been an official language in Jubaland in the five decades stretching from the 1880s to 1920s, and subsequently at a semi-official level during the British Military Administration (1940s) and UN Trusteeship (1950s) decades respectively. The official government website is currently only available in English.

== Orthography ==
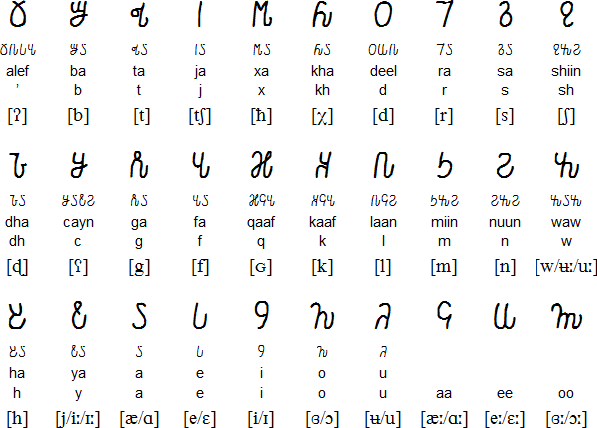
Somali writing scripts

A number of writing systems have been used for transcribing the Somali language. Of these, the Somali Latin alphabet is the most widely used, and has been the official writing script in Somalia since 1972.

The script was developed by a number of leading scholars of Somali, including Musa Haji Ismail Galal, B. W. Andrzejewski and Shire Jama Ahmed specifically for transcribing the Somali language, and uses all letters of the English Latin alphabet except p, v and z. There are no diacritics or other special characters except the use of the apostrophe for the glottal stop, which does not occur word-initially. There are three consonant digraphs: DH, KH and SH. Tone is not marked, and front and back vowels are not distinguished.

Besides Ahmed's Latin script, other orthographies that have been used for centuries for writing Somali include the long-established Arabic script and Wadaad's writing. Indigenous writing systems developed in the twentieth century include the Osmanya, Borama and Kaddare scripts, which were invented by Osman Yusuf Kenadid, Sheikh Abdurahman Sheikh Nuur and Hussein Sheikh Ahmed Kaddare, respectively.
