= Rendille–Boni languages =

Rendille–Boni
- Geographic distribution: Kenya
- Linguistic classification: Afro-Asiatic: Cushitic; East; Lowland East; Omo–Tana; East; Rendille–Boni
- Subdivisions: Aweer; Rendille

Language codes
- Glottolog: None
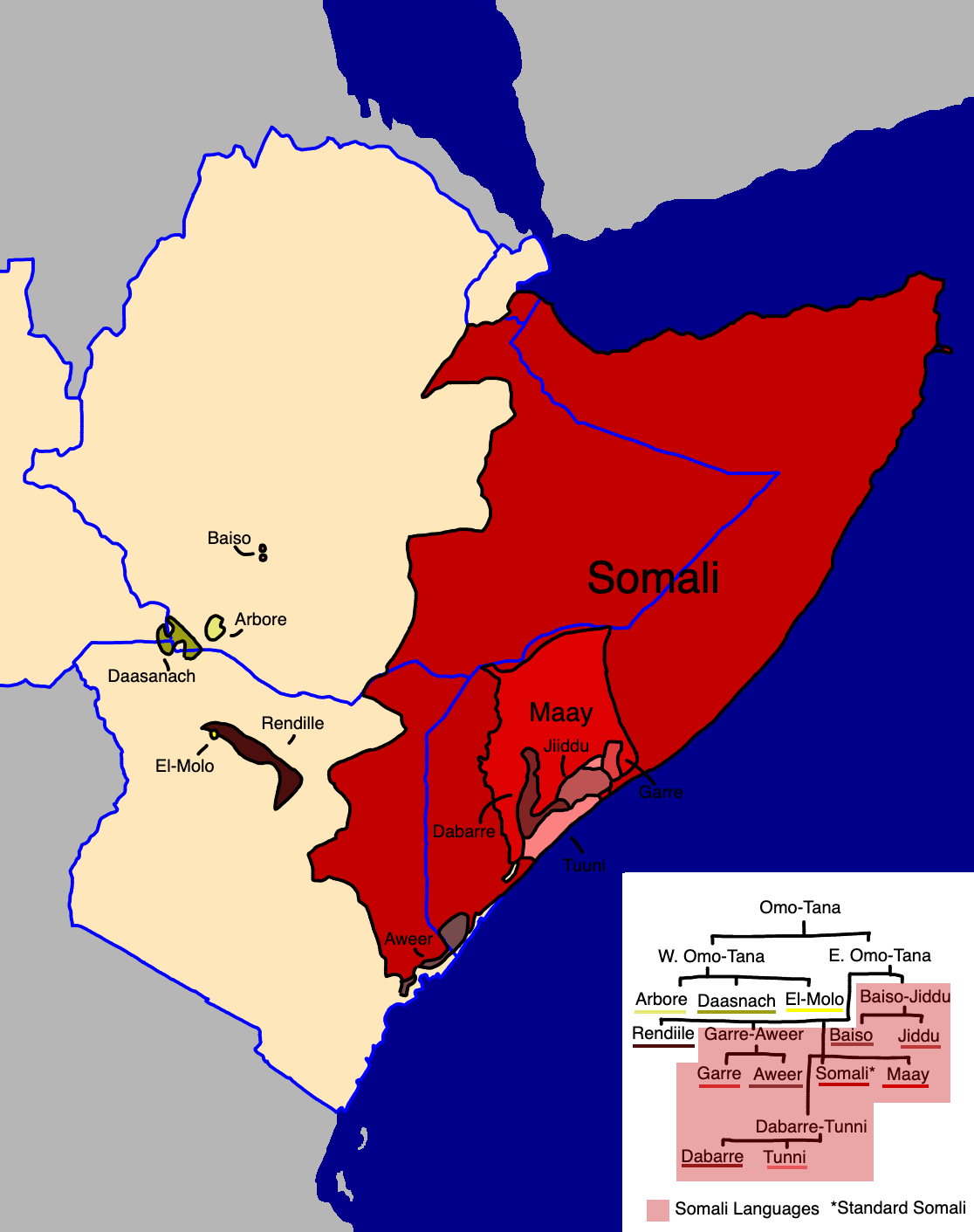

The Rendille–Boni languages is a proposed subgroup of the Macro-Somali languages, belonging to the Cushitic family. The languages are spoken in Kenya. The hypothesis has been by now rejected, in favor of grouping Aweer as a member of the Somali languages, closely related to Garre.
