= Omo–Tana languages =

Cushitic family of languages spoken in Djibouti, Ethiopia, Somalia and Kenya

Omo–Tana
- (disputed)
- Geographic distribution: Eastern and southern Ethiopia, Djibouti, Somaliland, Somalia, Northeast Kenya, and a small sliver of South Sudan
- Linguistic classification: Afro-Asiatic: Cushitic; Lowland East; Omo–Tana
- Subdivisions: Eastern (Somaloid)?; Western (Arboroid)

Language codes
- Glottolog: omot1245
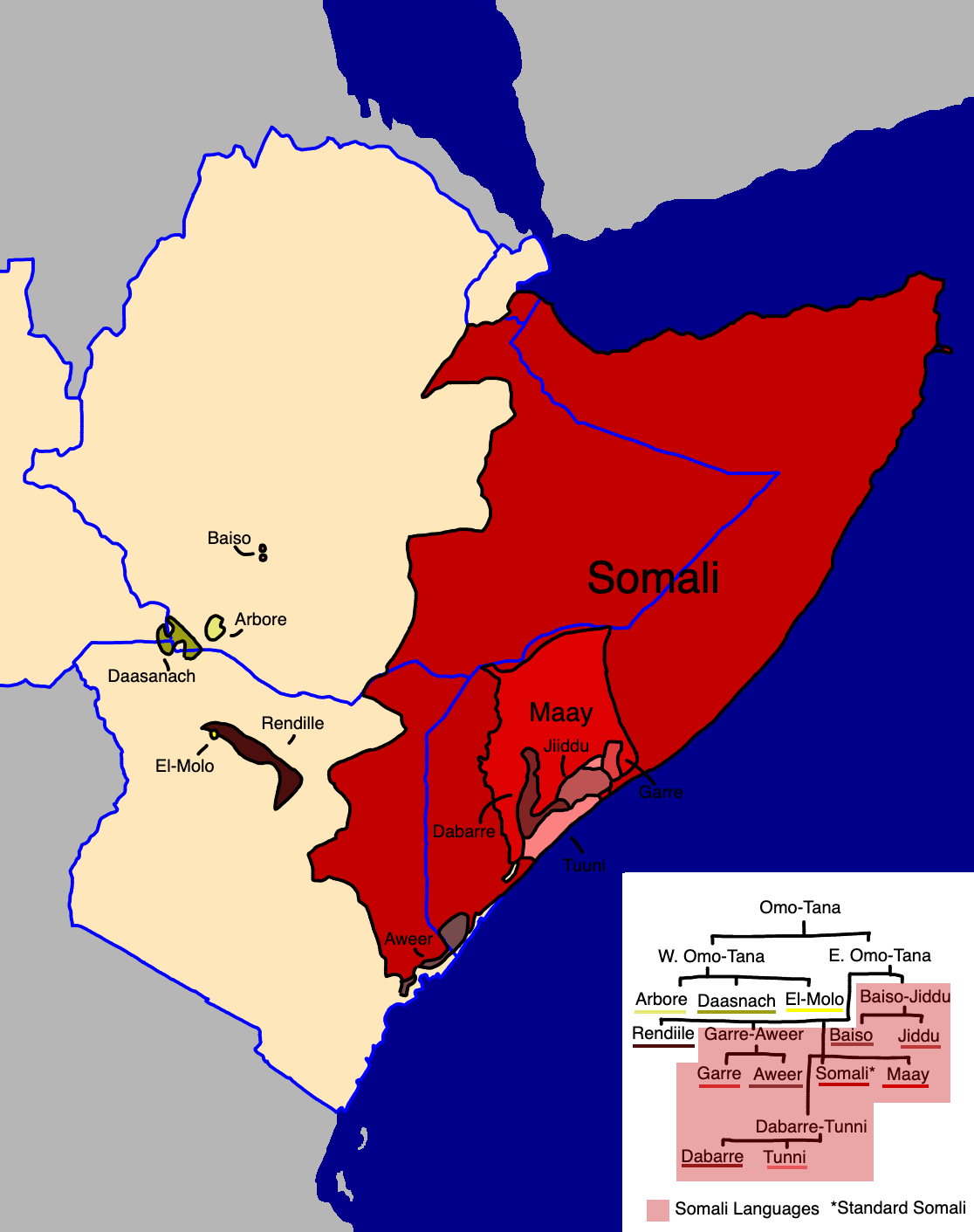

The Omo–Tana languages are a proposed branch of the Cushitic family and are spoken in Ethiopia, Djibouti, Somaliland, Somalia and Kenya. The largest member is Somali. It comprises two main groups, Arboroid (or Western Omo-Tana) and Somaloid (or Eastern Omo-Tana), which are sometimes also treated as independent branches of Lowland East Cushitic.

== Internal classification ==
- Omo-Tana
  - Western ("Galaboid" or "Arboroid") branch
    - Dhaasanac
    - Arbore
    - Elmolo
    - Yaaku
  - Eastern ("Somaloid") branch
    - Rendille
    - Karre–Boni
    - Tunni–Dabarre
    - Ashraf
    - Maay
    - Somali
