= Macro-Somali languages =

Language family

Macro-Somali
- Somaloid, Eastern Omo–Tana, Sam
- Geographic distribution: Somalia, Somaliland, Djibouti, Ethiopia, Kenya
- Linguistic classification: Afro-Asiatic: Cushitic; East; Lowland East; Omo–Tana; Macro-Somali
- Subdivisions: Somali; Dabarre; Jiiddu; Girirra; Garre; Tunni; Rendille

Language codes
- Glottolog: east2653
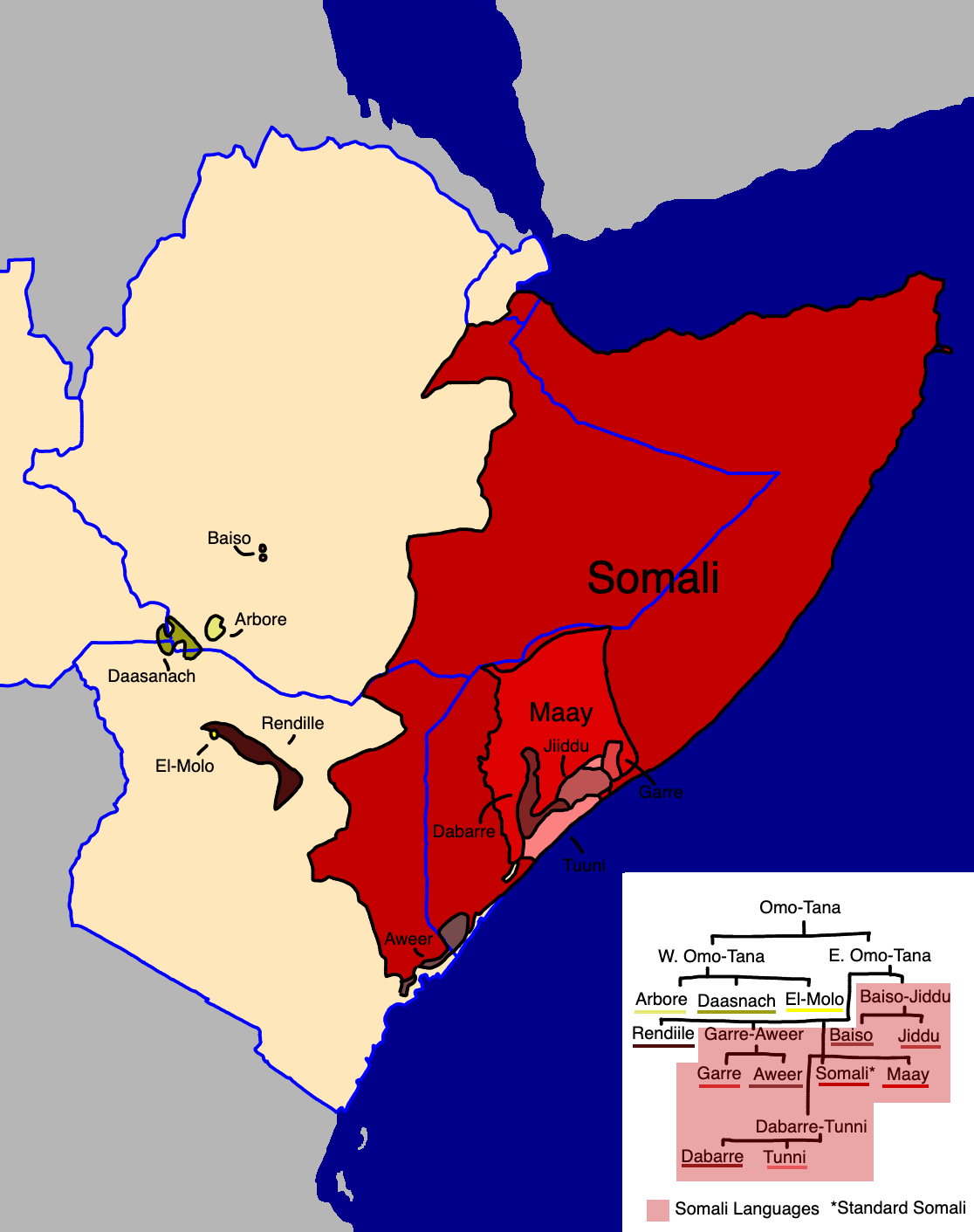

The Macro-Somali or Somaloid languages, or (in the conception of Bernd Heine, who does not include Baiso) Sam languages, are a branch of the Lowland East Cushitic languages. They are spoken in Somalia, Djibouti, Somaliland, eastern Ethiopia, and northern Kenya. The most widely spoken member is Somali.

== Languages ==
=== Heine, 1978 ===
The primary division is between Rendille versus the remaining languages, for which Heine proposes the terms "Eastern Sam" or "Dad". In this proposal, Baiso forms a Northern branch of Omo–Tana.

- Somaloid
  - Rendille
  - Eastern Sam
    - Boni (Aweer)
    - Girirra
    - Somali

=== Blench, 2006 ===
Within Blench's proposal, the primary division of Macro-Somali is first between Baiso, Sam, and Somali. Then within Sam, the primary split is between Rendille and Aweer. Girirra is left unclassified within Lowland East Cushitic.

- Macro-Somali
  - Bayso
  - Sam
    - Aweer
    - Rendille
  - Somali
    - Ashraaf
      - Lower Shebelle
      - Shingaani
    - Benaadir
      - Northern
        - Abgaal
        - Ajuraan
        - Gaaljacal
      - Southern
        - Bimaal
        - Xamari
    - Digil
      - Dabarre
      - Garre
      - Tunni
    - Jiiddu
    - Maay
      - Buur Hakaba
      - Northern
      - Southern
    - Midgaan?
    - North-Central Somali
      - Darood
      - Lower Juba
      - Northern
    - Yibir?

== Sound correspondences ==
The following sound correspondences hold between Rendille, Aweer and Somali:

Proto-Sam	Rendille	Aweer	Somali	notes
*b	b	b	b	
*d	d	d	d	
*g	g	k, -g-	g	
*g	dʒ	ʃ	dʒ ⟨j⟩	Before the vowel *i (palatalization).
*t	t	t, -d-	t, -d-	
*c	tʃ	ʃ, -y-	ʃ ⟨sh⟩, -j- ⟨y⟩	
*k	k	k, -g-	k, -g-	
*k	k	ʃ	k, -g-	Before the vowel *i.
*ɗ	ɖ	ɗ, -r-	ɖ ⟨dh⟩	Continues Proto-East Cushitic implosive *ɗ.
*q	x	ʔ	q	Continues Proto-East Cushitic ejective *kʼ.
*f	f	f	f	
*s	s	s	s	
*ħ	ħ	ħ, -h-	ħ ⟨x⟩	
*h	h, -ħ-	h	h	
*z	j	d	d	
*ʕ	ħ	ʔ	ʕ ⟨c⟩	
*ʔ	ħ	ʔ	lost	
*m	m	m, -n	m, -n	
*n	n	n	n	
*l	l	l	l	
*r	r	r	r	
*w	w	w	w, -b-	
*j	j	j	j ⟨y⟩	

The Eastern Sam or Dad group is characterized by the following four changes:

- The voiceless stops *t, *c, *k became voiced *d, *j, *g when following a vowel.
- Elsewhere, *c becomes a fricative *ʃ.
- *z > *d.
- *m > *n at the end of a word.

In Boni, several consonant clusters simplify:

- *mb, *nɗ, *ng > m, n, ŋ
- *ns > s
- *ng before *i > *ndʒ > *nʃ > ʃ
