= Girirra language =

Cushitic language spoken in Ethiopia

Girirra
- Af Girirra
- Native to: Ethiopia
- Region: Af-Dheer Zone, Somali Region, Ethiopia
- Ethnicity: Girirra, Somali
- Native speakers: 50,000 (2007)
- Language family: Afro-Asiatic: Cushitic; Lowland East; Macro-Somali; Girirra

Language codes
- ISO 639-3: gii
- Glottolog: giri1245

Girirra, also called Gariire, is a Cushitic language of Ethiopia. It has extensive borrowing from Somali. Although not mutually intelligible with Somali, it is estimated that around 70% of the Garirra language is made up of Somali loan words. There has not been many studies on the language itself and is often grouped into a small umbrella of the Macro-Somali language family including relatives like: Rendille, Boni, Bayso, and the two dialects of Somali, being Af-Maay, and Af-Maxaa (Standard Somali).

== Phonology ==
The following are the phonemes found in Girirra:

Consonant phonemes
		Labial	Alveolar	Palato- alveolar	Palatal	Velar	Glottal
Plosive/ Affricate	voiceless		t			k	ʔ
Plosive/ Affricate	voiced	b	d	d͡ʒ		ɡ	
Plosive/ Affricate	glottalic		ɗ	t͡ʃʼ		kʼ	
Fricative		f	s	ʃ			h
Nasal		m	n		ɲ		
Trill			r				
Approximant		w	l		j		

Word-initial /t/ and /k/ are aspirated [tʰ], [kʰ]

Possible word-final consonants are /b d g ʔ f s ʃ m n l r w j/. /b/, /d/, /g/ are devoiced [b̥], [d̥], [g̊].

The velar nasal [ŋ] is not a phoneme, but occurs before the velar stops /k, g, kʼ/, and can be considered an allophone of /n/.

Most consonants can occur geminate, with the exception of all glottal and glottalic consonants, /ɗ tʃʼ kʼ ʔ h/, and the palatoalveolars /d͡ʒ ʃ/.

The alveolar ejective /tʼ/ is used in some loanwords from Oromo, but is not a native consonant.

Vowels
	Front	Central	Back
Close	i, iː		u, uː
Mid	e, eː		o, oː
Open		a, aː	
