= Languages of Djibouti =

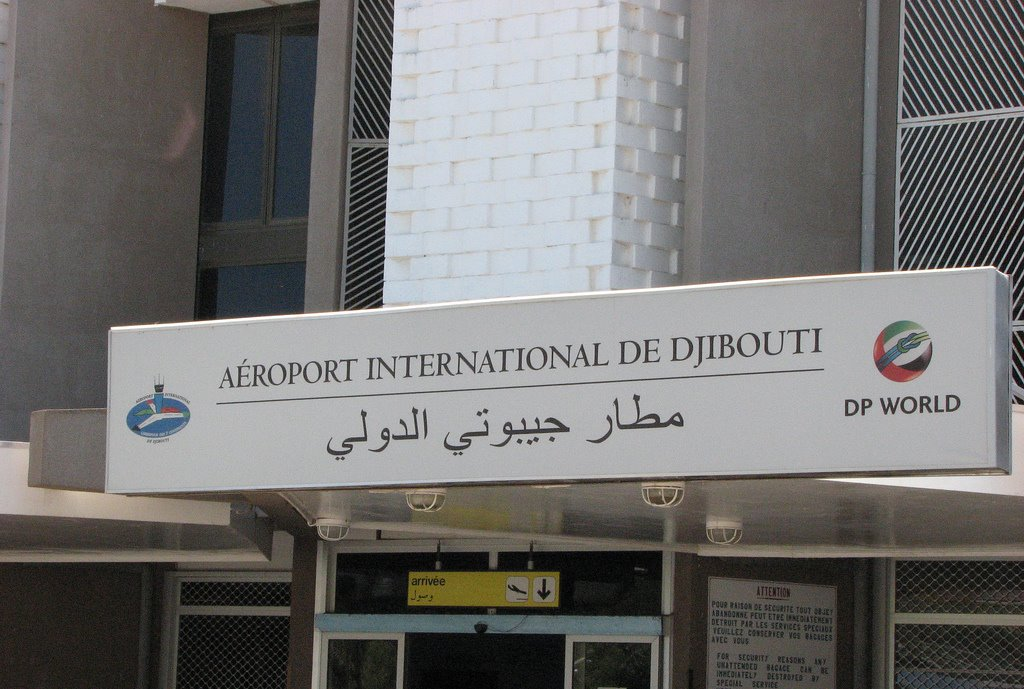
- Bilingual sign in French and Arabic at the Djibouti-Ambouli International Airport
- Official: Arabic, French
- Indigenous: Afar, Somali
- Immigrant: Oromo, Amharic, Ta'izzi-Adeni Arabic, Omani Arabic, Greek, Hindi
- Foreign: English, Italian
- Signed: Somali Sign Language
- Keyboard layout: QWERTY

The languages of Djibouti include Afar, Arabic, Somali and French. Somali and Afar are the most widely spoken tongues, and Arabic and French serve as the official languages.

According to the 2018 report from the Organisation internationale de la Francophonie, 50% of the population speaks French. French is the main language of schooling, from primary to university, alongside Arabic.

== Languages ==
Djibouti is a multilingual country. According to Ethnologue, the majority of the population speaks Somali (524,000 speakers) or Afar (306,000 speakers) as a first language, which are the mother tongues of the Somali and Afar ethnic groups, respectively. Both languages belong to the Cushitic branch of the larger Afro-Asiatic family. Northern Somali is the main dialect spoken in the country and neighbouring Somalia.

There are two official languages in Djibouti: Arabic and French. Arabic is of religious importance. In a formal setting, it consists of Modern Standard Arabic. Colloquially, about 59,000 local residents speak the Ta'izzi-Adeni Arabic dialect, known in Djibouti as Djiboutian Arabic. French was inherited from the European colonization period and is the primary language of instruction. About 17,000 Djiboutians speak it as a first language.

Immigrant languages include Omani Arabic (38,900 speakers), Amharic (1,400 speakers), Greek (1,000 speakers) and Hindi (600 speakers).

Additionally, the Somali deaf community in Djibouti uses the Somali Sign Language.

The Somali language is regulated by the Regional Somali Language Academy, an intergovernmental institution established in June 2013 in Djibouti City by the governments of Djibouti, Somalia and Ethiopia. It is officially mandated with preserving the Somali language.

== Writing system ==
Nationally, the Latin script is the most widely used orthography for all languages. The Somali alphabet, a modified form of the script, is used to write Somali. In the early 1970s, two Afar intellectuals and nationalists, Dimis and Redo, formalized a similar Afar alphabet. Known as Qafar Feera, the orthography is also based on the Latin script.

Additionally, Somali and Afar are transcribed using the Arabic script.
