= Jiiddu language =

Afro-Asiatic language of Somalia

Jiiddu
- Af-Jiiddu
- Native to: Somalia
- Region: Lower Shabelle, Bay, Middle Juba
- Ethnicity: Jiido
- Native speakers: 34,000 (2020)
- Language family: Afro-Asiatic: Cushitic; Lowland East; Macro-Somali; Somali; Jiiddu

Language codes
- ISO 639-3: jii
- Glottolog: jiid1238

Jiiddu (also known as Jiddu or Af-Jiiddu) is a Somali language spoken by the Jiiddu sub-clan of the Dir, a Somali clan inhabiting southern Somalia. It currently has an estimated 34,000 speakers, concentrated in the Lower Shabeelle, Bay and Middle Juba regions.

Typically classified as part of the Digil group of languages, Jiiddu has a different phonology and sentence structure from Somali. However, it more closely resembles Somali than Baiso. "It reportedly some similarities to Konsoid languages and to" and Highland East Cushitic languages spoken in southern Ethiopia.

There is a dictionary of Jiddu by a native speaker, Dr. Salim Ibro.

== Additional sourcers ==
- Michael S., Neterer. 2021. Somali Jiiddu language development : a seventy-year journey, 1951-2021. Dallas International University: MA thesis.
