= Rendille =

Rendille may refer to:

- Rendille people
- Rendille language
