= Boon language =

Endangered Cushitic language of Somalia

Boon
- Af-Boon
- Native to: Somalia
- Region: Jilib, Middle Juba
- Native speakers: (60 cited 2000)
- Language family: Afro-Asiatic: Cushitic; Lowland East?; Boon

Language codes
- ISO 639-3: bnl
- Glottolog: boon1242
- ELP: Boon

Boon or Af-Boon is a nearly extinct Cushitic language spoken by 59 people (as of 2000) in Jilib District, Middle Jubba Region of southern Somalia. In recent decades they have shifted to the Maay dialect of Jilib. All speakers were reported in the 1980s to be older than 60. Their traditional occupations are as hunters, leatherworkers and, more recently, shoemakers.

== Classification ==
Lamberti and following him Ethnologue and Glottolog leave the language unclassified within Eastern Cushitic. Blench (2006) leaves it as unclassified within Cushitic, as records are too fragmentary to allow more than that.

== Phonology ==
Unlike in the Somali languages, nouns and pronouns in Boon often end in vowels, e.g. afi 'mouth', hididi 'vein', illa 'eye', luki 'leg'; hebla 'he' (cf. standard Somali af, xidid, il, lug; hebel 'someone').

== Vocabulary ==
A number of words with no cognates in Somali but still in other Cushitic languages are noted by Lamberti:

- bafee 'lungs' ~ Oromo bafeed 'to breathe' (contrast Somali sambab 'lung')
- booGo 'jaw' ~ Oromo bookho (contrast Somali daan)
- dhinne 'rib' ~ Oromo čʼinnač (contrast Somali feer)
- helliiso 'liver' ~ Rendille xelesi (contrast Somali beer)

Some other words seem to be of unknown provenance:

- dimbaaro 'lip'
- dhuumma 'kidney'
- figgilo 'fingernail'
- gabo 'breast'
- maaka 'knee'
- muddur 'finger'
- naaju 'man'
- naata 'body, skin'
- simbiino 'tear'
