= Somali Sign Language =

Deaf sign language of Somalia

- SSL
- Native to: Somalia, Djibouti
- Language family

Language codes
- ISO 639-3: None (mis)

Somali Sign Language (SSL) is a sign language used by the deaf community in Somalia and Djibouti.

== Development ==
Somali Sign Language was originally developed by a Somali man educated in a Somali deaf school in Wajir, Kenya. In 1997, he used his knowledge of English and Kenyan Sign Language (KSL) to establish the first school for the deaf in the city of Borama, situated in northwestern Somalia. He had originally proposed the idea as far back as 1977. One of the teachers at Borama soon founded a deaf school in Djibouti. With a bit more difficulty, another was established in Hargeisa, the capital of the autonomous Somaliland region in northwestern Somalia. Through the years, the Djibouti school's sign language system has remained the Somali Sign Language. It has, however, followed a different developmental path.

SSL's growth has been both consistent and quick. The first graduating class at the Borama school all passed with high marks. Alongside written Somali and English in Somalia and Somali and French in Djibouti, pupils in all the deaf schools have used SSL, which still shows its KSL influences.

In addition, there are plans to establish a new SSL-based deaf school in the northeastern city of Bosaso, the commercial capital of Somalia's autonomous Puntland region. The Somali National Association for the Deaf (SNAD), Deaf Unity and other leaders in Somalia's deaf community are also working together to build more deaf schools in the country, where the Somali Sign Language is to be taught.

== Characteristics ==
Unlike many other new sign language systems, the Somali Sign Language is not based on a foreign culture and language. It is instead centered on the Somali culture and Somali language (Af-Somali). As such, SSL's growth has been affected by a sense of shared nationhood between ethnic Somalis inhabiting both Somalia proper and other areas in or near the Horn of Africa.

The Somali Sign language is also different from KSL and most other sign languages on the continent in that it was started by a deaf person, while the majority of the first deaf schools elsewhere were established by hearing people. Additionally, SSL's creator himself already had sign language skills. This is often not the case with other sign languages, whose hearing inventors not seldom lack sign language skills and come from environments where sign communication is regarded as counterproductive to language development. Research has likewise shown that when deaf sign language users establish a country's education programs for deaf children, a national sign language develops more quickly.

== See also ==
- Languages of Somalia
- Languages of Djibouti
- Kenyan Sign Language
