= Garre language =

Cushitic language spoken in Kenya and Somalia

Garre
- Af-Garre
- اف الخرّيي
- Native to: Kenya, Somalia, Ethiopia
- Region: Mandera, Moyale, Bay, Lower Shabelle
- Ethnicity: Garre
- Native speakers: 690,000 (2019–2020)
- Language family: Afro-Asiatic: Cushitic; Lowland East; Somali; Digil; Garre

Language codes
- ISO 639-3: gex
- Glottolog: garr1259
- ELP: Garre

Garre (also known as Af-Garre) is a Somali language spoken by the Garre who reside in southern Somalia, Ethiopia and northern Kenya. It belongs to the family's Cushitic branch, and had an estimated 50,000 speakers in Somalia in 1992, 57,500 in 2006 and 86,000 in 2020. The total number of speakers in Kenya and Somalia was estimated at 685,600 in 2019. Garre is in the Digil classification of Somali dialects. Garre language is readily intelligible to Digil speakers, as it has some affinity with Af-Maay and Af-Boon.

== Geographic Distribution ==
For a reconstruction of the historical movements of the Af-Garre which places its original site in the interfluvial area, perhaps near the upper River Juba, the dialect described the one spoken by the Garre (especially Tuuf) of the Basso Shabeelle: the garre of this area would be the only ones to have maintain their language specific to them; as for the Garre of the Mandera region[ "Around Dolo on the upper Juba "] and, further west, up to Moyale, they speak essentially a Borana dialect, most as their bilingual language; and then there is Garre Libin (Garre of the West that is Ethiopia and Kenya) and Garre Kofar (Garre in Qoroyoley)

Af-Garre is spoken in the districts of Baydhaba, Dhiinsor, Buurhakaba and Qoryooley is one of the heterogeneous dialect of Somalia; in fact, some Garreh dialects ( those in Buurhakaba and Qoryooley) have, for instance, preserved the conjugations with prefixes to date, while others (those of Baydhaba) have already given it up. Also, the typical Digil plural morpheme —tə has been replaced in some Garre dialects (especially in those around Baydhaba) by the common southern Somali morpheme—yaal.

== Phonology ==
=== Consonants ===
Garre has 22 consonant phonemes.

Garre consonant phonemes
		Labial	Dental	Alveolar	Retroflex	Palato- alveolar	Palatal	Velar	Uvular	Glottal
Plosive	voiceless		t					k		ʔ
Plosive	voiced	b	d		ɖ			g	ɢ	
Plosive	implosive					ʄ				
Affricate						d͡ʒ				
Fricatives		f		s		ʃ		x~χ		h
Nasals		m	n				ɲ	ŋ		
Liquid				l						
Vibrant				r						
Semivowels		w					j			

==== Occlusive consonants ====
===== Devoicing and neutralization =====
At the end of a word, the voiced stops b, d are devoiced: E1: b, d → p, t / __≠

- /karab/ → [karap] 'shoulder'
- /heed/ → [heet] 'sickle'

In this position, therefore, the voicing opposition of /d/ and /t/ is neutralized.

At the end of a word, /g/ becomes a glottal stop: E2: g → ʔ/__ ≠

- /maʔag/ → [maʔaʔ] 'name'

Often, in the final position of a word followed by a word starting in a consonant, an occlusive is not exploded.

E3: OCCL → OCCL'/__≠ C__≠

(OCCL': occlusive is not exploited)

This happens in particular if the two words are morphologically united, as in the periphrastic verbal forms:

(3) usu wa ara[g]šrə 'he was selling' (habitually).

On the other hand, spirantization of voiced stops in intervocalic positions, such as is present for example in Dabarte, does not seem to occur in Garre. - at least of the tuuf dialect variety of Qoryooley -

The spirantization and the passage of b to w are instead quite frequent in the list of words Garres, e.g.

- hawar = habar 'woman'
- taweel = tabeel 'wind'

This is a typical feature of the Garre dialect spoken in the Baydhaba area. A similar process occurs in the Maay dialect of the same region.

Despite the existence of the implosive /ʄ/, the postalveolar /ɖ/ is never glottalized.

===== q =====
From our articulated [G] (voiced uvular stop), in general also in intervocalic position; its fricativization in [ʁ] could be a derivation of the Qoryoley dialect; we have been given pairs such as sii[G]a (T.) ~ sii[ʁ]a (Q.) “dust”.

In a few cases, however, there is constantly realized [ʁ] in intervocalic position, as in ho[ʁ]al "cloud".

As in the other dialects of the region, in final q and realized ʔ:

E4: q → ʔ/__≠

(4) duq → [duʔ] __≠ "elderly

===== ʔ =====
In the initial position of speech, in front of vowel and sometimes realized a glottal occlusion, especially at the beginning of a sentence or in the case that the word in question is emphasized: but in most cases this exclusion glottal is not ubidable. However, we believe that ʔ is Phonologically present in all the words K. "beginning in a vowel" - consequently, all the words K. begin phonologically in a consonant. A proof of the presence of initial ʔ is given of the present tense of the verbs of the fourth conjugation by suffixing the present with prefixes of "to be" to the theme:

the theme of the verb will be affixed ahay "I am", in front of which a final nasal theme will be created ɳ, that is, as in front of a consonant with a backward articulation point (for example, in front of the masculine morpheme, the present of wiin "be great", and wiiɳahay.

It could also be argued that in this form "n" passes to "ɳ" since the word boundary is preserved between "wiin and ahay" - that is, "n" would be found in the other context in which "ɳ" is created . But a similar argument is falsified by the examination of other forms of the same paradigm, in which there is an assimilation between the final consonant of the theme and the initial consonant of the paradigm of "being"; thus, is wiinahay, which derives from wiin + tahay.

We are therefore forced to choose between two possible alternatives: the phonemic, distinctive consideration, the presence of an initial ʔ - but in this case it would be difficult to explain its possible occurrence in certain contexts for all the words "beginning in a vowel"; or, and it is the alternative we propose, put a ʔ phonological for all words which would otherwise begin in a vowel - and which as such are often phonetically spelled A similar alternative and has adapted, with similar arguments, by Hayward in the description of the Arbore.

However, being totally predictable, we do not indicate this initial ʔ in the transcription.

ʔ also appears in the median position, but it seems that within the but it is always intervocalic - with a preference for the Sequence -a? a- - and encounters with other consonants are excluded (which instead are allowed with suffixes):

5) maʔag="name"

naʔas = "'breast"

towaʔdii = "the jackal" (towaʔ + -tii anaphoric determinant: )

ʔ also appears at the end of a word:

(6) karaʔ = "Rope used to wear/put the camel's chest"

suusaʔ "Milk curds of camel"

kubaʔ = "Thunder"

The phonemic of ʔ at the end also confirmed by the treatment of the masculine morpheme k of the article, which falls after ʔas after the other consonants.

==== Occlusive glottalize ====
The only glottalized consonant is the palatal implosive /ʄ/. It is not found at the end of a word. Examples in initial position:

- /ʄiif/ 'pleasure'
- /ʄeeh/ 'slash'

Examples in the middle position:

- /maʄooʄi/ 'to crush'
- /ʄeʄab/ 'pot-shards'

==== Fricatives ====
A voiceless velar fricative /x/ appears in very few words, some evidently borrowed, e.e. /taxtar/ 'doctor' (S.St takhtar), but also, for example, in /xonton/ 'fifty', where one would expect Konton. ( pharyngeal fricative /ħ/, written x in Somali orthography, is absent in Garre.)

The voiceless glottal fricative /h/ appears both in the initial position

- hamal 'leaf'
- hedid 'root'
- hebiin 'night'

and medially:

- deheb 'gold'
- ahsaan 'please, thank you'
- bahall 'snake'

In the final position, it seems to freely alternate with [ʔ]:

- lih ~ liʔ 'six'
- ɖeh ~ ɖeʔ "Di" (opp. ɖehnə ’plural" ɖaha)

This alternation does not seem to extend to words ending in an etymological /ʔ/ (e.g. kubaʔ 'thunder', S.ST. gugac). The alternance / h / ~ / ʔ / therefore seems to be an areal phenomenon not specific to a dialect.

==== Nasal occlusives ====
===== General phonetic and phonological processes =====
The nasals are subject to numerous assimilatory processes and restrictions

of occurrence in certain positions. While the phonemic stats of bilabial nasal 'm' and of a dental 'n' and also, to a limited extent, of a palatal 'p', do not create problems, different is the case of the velar 'ɳ'. First of all, in many contexts The articulation of the nasal is determined by the following sound, to which the nasal is assimilated at the point of articulation. Opposite, respectively, a bilabial, a dental and a velar (or a more rearward joint), a kind of nasal & possible

E5: N → m/__b

(ie: a nasal is articulated as bilabial in front of a b).

E6: N → n/__d,t

(that is: a nasal is articulated n in front of a dental occlusive).

E7: N → ɳ/__g,k,q ʔ

(that is: a nasal is articulated as a veil in front of an occlusion with a velar or more rearward articulation point).

A nasal, furthermore, is articulated 4 at the end of a word:≠

E8: N → ɳ/__≠

and passes to "n" in front of the palatal semivocal y:

E9: N → ɳ/__y

These rules apply, as well as within the topic, in the delicate posting of nominal and verbal endings. As for the joint phenomena specifically, In addition to the rules we have given, there are no other restrictions on the occurrence in any position of "m and n" '. The case of p and β is different.

===== ɲ =====
In the collected material, the palatal nasal never appears in the final word position. Initially it only occurs in ɲuuq “little; small" and in the videophone ɲa" eat! " (with the same meaning ɲ can be pre-glottidalized: ʔɲaa, we also need j-a); it is natural to connect this form to the singular imperative of "eating" in Oromo: nyaaddhu.

In many cases the presence of "ɲ" in the median position is determined by the application of E7 in the encounter between a theme in the nasal and a suffix; for example, wiin + yahay→ wiiɲahay "he is great", lan + yaw ~ laɲaw "oh name!" (vocative).

However, "ɲ" appears in the lexicon, albeit to a limited extent; for example in:

(11) maaɲo “tare”

gaɲɲuuf “saliva”

mapaʔ "Milk at the first stage of acidity"

Given the impossibility of deriving these ʔ cases from the application of a more general phonemic process, I consider ɲphonemic in K.

===== ŋ =====
The status of 'ŋ' in Garre is rather complex: it is excluded in the initial word position and appears only in very few words in the middle position, for example in haŋuur "'food" and foŋor "cracking (of vase)" . In these forms a veil or uvular is completely assimilated to the previous nasal:

compare hunguri dialect fonqor of the dialect Qoryoley. - the latter form derived by dissimilation from + foggorr: Ali (1985: 345: n, 59} reports faqqar (glossing pot missing pieces), It's the same shape as faŋar.

As we have seen ( E8), “ŋ” appears in the final position, where seems to be the only possible nasal {equal in Maay, cf. Saced (1982: 5)]. But a final nasal is also performed ŋ in the intervocalic position, and precisely when an article or a possessive is affixed to a nasal masculine noun, determinants in which the morpheme of masculine & falls, the union of word "uomo" and of the (masculine) article "ka" will therefore give "laga".

In K. - at least in T. dialect - a process seems to operate which resolves a nasal + velar connection by assimilating the latter to the nasal, which becomes velarized in ŋ; this process is lexically determined, given that with other determinants (the anaphoric and the indeterminate / interrogative) the link ŋk is preserved (naturally realized [ŋ k], E7); but it could also depend on the rhythm of the sentence (more frequent with a fast pace and an informal style).

We will have lost:

Morphemic representation | phonological | phonetics

/ian/ + /ka/ lanka [laŋka]

[laŋa]

Of the phonetic representations, the earliest & data from the application of E7 (N → ŋ / __k), the second from the application of the (lexically determined) process of resolution of the link nk.

On the contrary, with female names we will have:

Morphemic representation | phonological | phonetics

/islaan / + / ta / islaanta [isiaanta]

[islaanna]

[islaana]

The first phonetic representation is given by the application of E6 (N ~ n/ _t), the second from the assimilation of the dental to the nasal, Which can be subsequently determined (giving [islaana]).

Consequently, n and ŋ often distinguish, in an intervocalic position, the gender of the noun. On the basis of its possibility of occurrence in the intervocalic position - where the other nasals are naturally also allowed - we recognize the phonemic status of ŋ. In fact, phonological representations such as lanka and islaanta would be not only too distant from the phonetic forms laŋa and islaana, but the latter. they are not even linked to their presumed phonological representations by general processes (and non lexically or morphologically determined),

Only in the median [ŋ] phonetic position will ŋ be transcribed in the final - given its complete predictability - we will transcribe n.

=== 1.2. Vowels ===
The vowel system of Garre. it seems to include 11 phonemes in total: 6 short and 5 long; the inhomogeneity in the number of phonemes of the two subsystems of long and short vowels is given by the presence, between the short vowels, of ə

The collected material does not allow to ascertain the presence of an opposition between advanced vowels (V) and vowels (V), as described for the north-central Somali(but not for the dialects of the river region),

the vowel system of Garre. can therefore be represented as follows:

	Short vowels			Long vowels		
	Front	Central	Back	Front	Central	Back
High	ɪ		ʊ	iː		uː
Mid	e	(ə)	o	eː		oː
Low		a			aː	

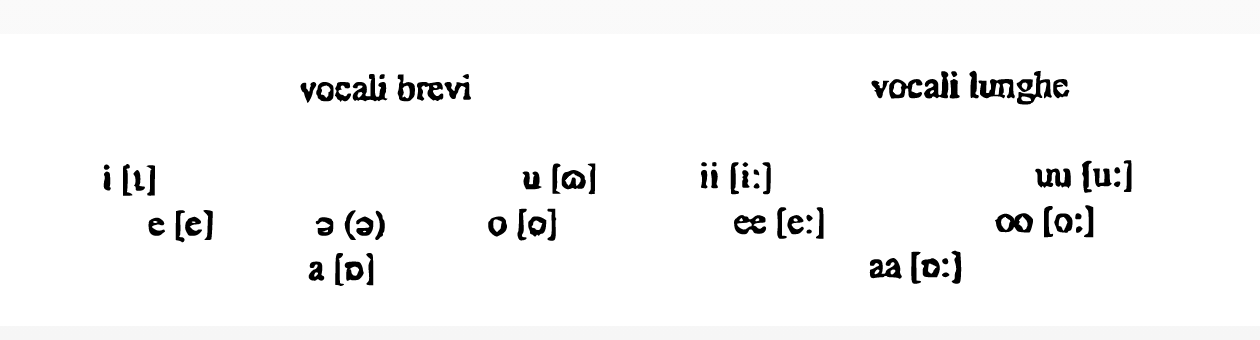
Long and short vowel

==== 1.2.1. "ə" and the problem of vowel length at the end of a word ====
The phonological status of ‘ə’ and problematic and the situation in Garre. appears in many ways similar to that of the Maay described by Saeed (1982; 7). In particular, the question is whether ə should be considered a phoneme or the result of short vowel reduction rules. Not without doubts, we will consider "e" - historically derived certainly from the reduction of short vowels - as a phonological in

The following is to be considered a simple contribution to the problem, not a solution to it.

== Cited works ==
- Lamberti, Marcello (1984). The linguistic situation in the Somali Democratic Republic. Proceedings of the Second International Congress of Somali Studies. Vol. I: Linguistics and Literature. Helmut Buske Verlag.
- Lamberti, Marcello (1986). Map of the Somali Dialects in the Somali Democratic Republic. H. Buske. ISBN 3-87118-690-2.
- Tosco, Mauro (1989). Schizzo grammaticale del dialetto Karre di Qoryooley (PDF). Studi Somali. Vol. 9. Archived from the original (PDF) on Dec 15, 2023.
