= Northern Somali =

Dialect of the Somali language

- Af Waqooyi — Maxaa Tiri
- Native to: Somalia, Somaliland, Djibouti, Ethiopia
- Language family: Afro-Asiatic: Cushitic; Lowland East; Macro-Somali; Somali; Northern Somali

Language codes
- ISO 639-3: –
- Glottolog: nort3051

Northern Somali (Somali: Af Waqooyi, Maay: Maxaa Tiri) is a dialect of the Somali language and forms the basis for Standard Somali. It is spoken by more than 70% of the entire Somali population, with its speech area stretching from Djibouti, Somaliland and the Somali Region of Ethiopia to the Northern Frontier District in Kenya. This widespread modern distribution is a result of a long series of southward population movements over the past ten centuries from the Gulf of Aden littoral.

== Overview ==
Speech sample in Standard Somali (an Islamic discourse containing many Arabic loanwords)

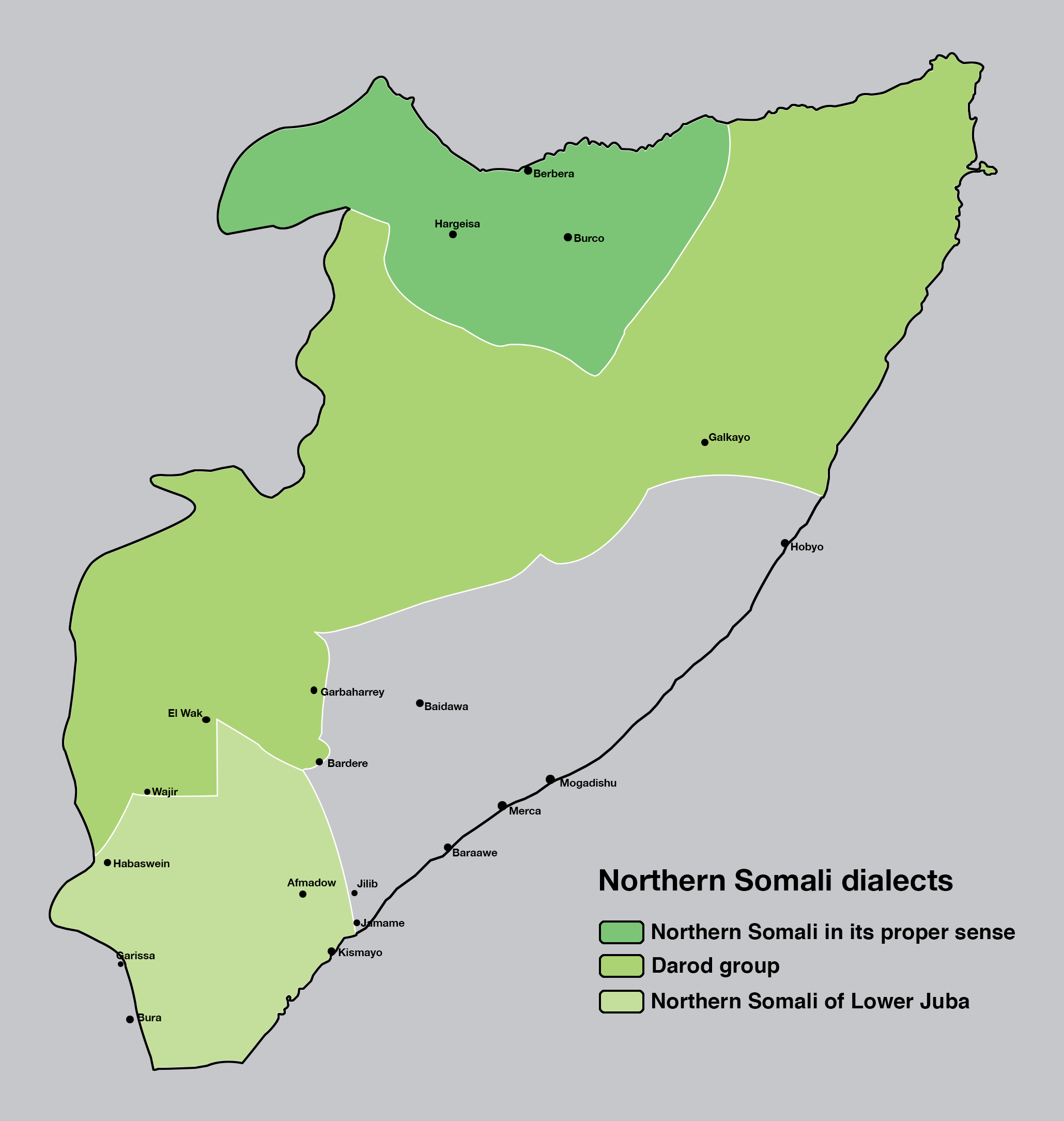
Northern Somali (Nsom) dialect subgroups

Northern Somali is spoken by more than 70% of the entire Somali population. Its primary speech area stretches from Djibouti, Somaliland and to parts of the eastern and southwestern sections of Somalia. This widespread modern distribution is a result of a long series of southward population movements over the past ten centuries from the Gulf of Aden littoral.

Northern Somali is subdivided into three dialects: Northern Somali proper (spoken in the northwest), the Darod group (spoken in the northeast and along the eastern Ethiopia frontier), and the Lower Juba group (spoken by northern Somali settlers in the southern riverine areas). Northern Somali has frequently been used by famous Somali poets as well as the political elite, and thus has the most prestige out of the Somali dialects. Due to being wide spread, it forms the basis for Standard Somali. Most of the classical Somali poetry is recited and composed in the Northern Somali dialect. The dialect of the Isaaq clan-family has been reported to be the highest prestige of any other Somali dialect.

Northern Somali also contains many Harari loanwords.

== Varieties ==
Lamberti divides Northern Somali into three subgroups:

- Northern Somali proper: spoken in the countries of Djibouti and Somaliland (Awdal, Maroodi Jeex, Saaxil, Togdheer, Sanaag and Sool). The dialects belonging to this group are the Issa, Gadabuursi, Isaaq and the northern Darod (Warsangeli and Dulbahante). The greatest number of speakers overall.
- Darod group: spoken in the regions of Bari, Nugal, Mudug, in the Somali Region of Ethiopia and along the Ethiopian border in the regions of Galguduud, Bakool and Gedo. The dialects of this group are the North-Eastern dialects (Majeerteen, Marehan and Ogaden).
- Lower Juba group: spoken by the part of the Northern Somali population which have immigrated into the Lower Juba region in the last 100/150 years. As this territory was a Benaadir-speaking area before the arrival of the immigrants from the north, the Nsom of Lower Jubba presents many peculiarities typical for the Benaadir dialects and could be considered a Benaadirised Nsom.
