= Somali language =

Cushitic language of the Horn of Africa

Somali
- Af Soomaali, Soomaali 𐒖𐒍 𐒈𐒝𐒑𐒛𐒐𐒘, 𐒈𐒝𐒑𐒛𐒐𐒘 اف صومالِ, صومالِ
- Pronunciation: [af soːmaːli]
- Region: Horn of Africa
- Ethnicity: Somalis
- Native speakers: 24 million (2019–2024)
- Language family: Afro-Asiatic: Cushitic; East; Lowland; Macro-Somali; Somali languages; Somali
- Dialects: Northern; Benadiri; Ashraf; Maay
- Writing system: Somali Latin alphabet (Latin script; official); Wadaad's writing (Arabic script, occasional); Osmanya script (occasional)

Official status
- Official language in: Somalia; Somaliland; Ethiopia; Djibouti (national)
- Recognised minority language in: Kenya
- Regulated by: Regional Somali Language Academy

Language codes
- ISO 639-1: so
- ISO 639-2: som
- ISO 639-3: som
- Glottolog: soma1255
- Linguasphere: 14-GAG-a
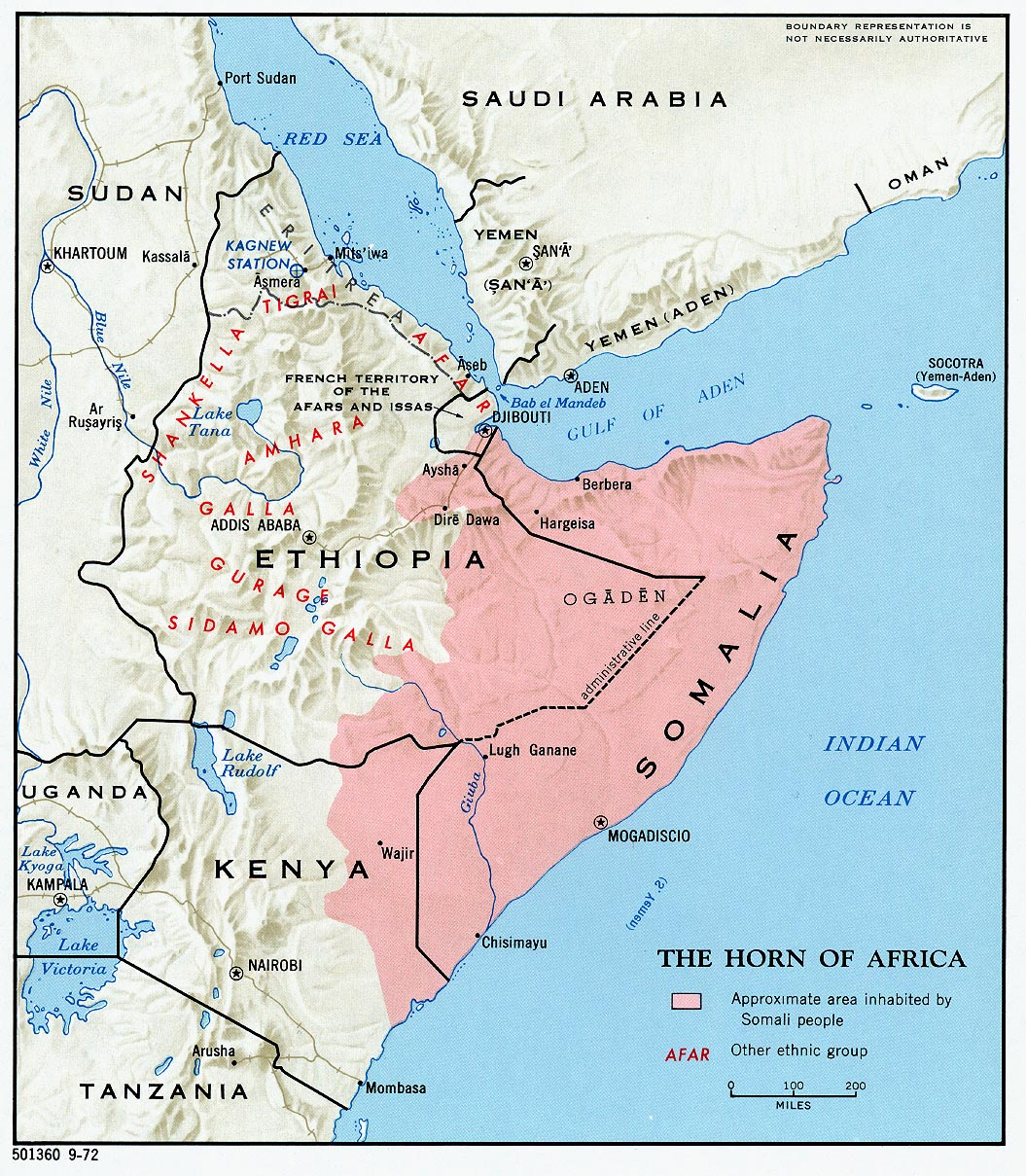
- Primary Somali Sprachraum

Somali (/səˈmɑːli, soʊ-/ sə-MAH-lee, soh-; Latin script: Af Soomaali, Wadaad: اف صومالِ, Osmanya: 𐒖𐒍 𐒈𐒝𐒑𐒛𐒐𐒘 [af soːmaːli]) is a Cushitic language belonging to wider Afroasiatic language family. Somali is spoken primarily in Greater Somalia, and the Somali diaspora as a mother tongue. It is an official language in Somalia, Somaliland, and Ethiopia. It serves as a national language in Djibouti, and is also a recognised minority language in Kenya. The language is officially written with the Somali Latin alphabet, although an Arabic alphabet and several indigenous scripts (Osmanya, Kaddare and Borama) are used informally.

== Classification ==
Somali is classified within the Cushitic branch of the Afroasiatic family, specifically, Lowland East Cushitic in addition to Afar and Saho. Somali is the best-documented of the Cushitic languages, with academic studies of the language dating back to the late 19th century.

== Geographic distribution of Somali ==
The Somali language is spoken in Somali inhabited areas of Somalia, Djibouti, Ethiopia, Kenya, Yemen and by members of the Somali diaspora. It is also spoken as an adoptive language by a few ethnic minority groups and individuals in Somali majority regions.

Somali is the most widely spoken Cushitic language in the region followed by Oromo and Afar.

As of 2021, there are approximately 24 million speakers of Somali, spread in Greater Somalia of which around 17 million reside in Somalia. The language is spoken by an estimated 95% of the country's inhabitants, and also by a majority of the population in Djibouti.

Following the start of the Somali Civil War in the early 1990s, the Somali-speaking diaspora increased in size, with newer Somali speech communities forming in parts of the Middle East, North America and Europe.

=== Official status ===
Constitutionally, Somali and Arabic are the two official languages of Somalia. Somali has been an official national language since January 1973, when the Supreme Revolutionary Council (SRC) declared it the Somali Democratic Republic's primary language of administration and education. Somali was thereafter established as the main language of academic instruction in forms 1 through 4, following preparatory work by the government-appointed Somali Language Committee. It later expanded to include all 12 forms in 1979. In 1972, the SRC adopted a Latin orthography as the official national alphabet over several other writing scripts that were then in use. Concurrently, the Italian-language daily newspaper Stella d'Ottobre ("The October Star") was nationalized, renamed to Xiddigta Oktoobar, and began publishing in Somali. The state-run Radio Mogadishu has also broadcast in Somali since 1951. Additionally, other regional public networks like Somaliland National TV and Puntland TV and Radio and, as well as Eastern Television Network and Horn Cable Television, among other private broadcasters, air programs in Somali.

Somali is recognized as an official working language in the Somali Region of Ethiopia. Although it is not an official language of Djibouti, it constitutes a major national language there. Somali is used in television and radio broadcasts, with the government-operated Radio Djibouti transmitting programs in the language from 1943 onwards.

The Kenya Broadcasting Corporation also broadcasts in the Somali language in its Iftin FM Programmes. The language is spoken in the Somali territories within North Eastern Kenya, namely Wajir County, Garissa County and Mandera County.

The Somali language is regulated by the Regional Somali Language Academy, an intergovernmental institution established in June 2013 in Djibouti City by the governments of Djibouti, Somalia and Ethiopia. It is officially mandated with preserving the Somali language.

As of 2025, Somali, Afar and Oromo are the only 3 Cushitic languages available on Google Translate.

== Varieties ==
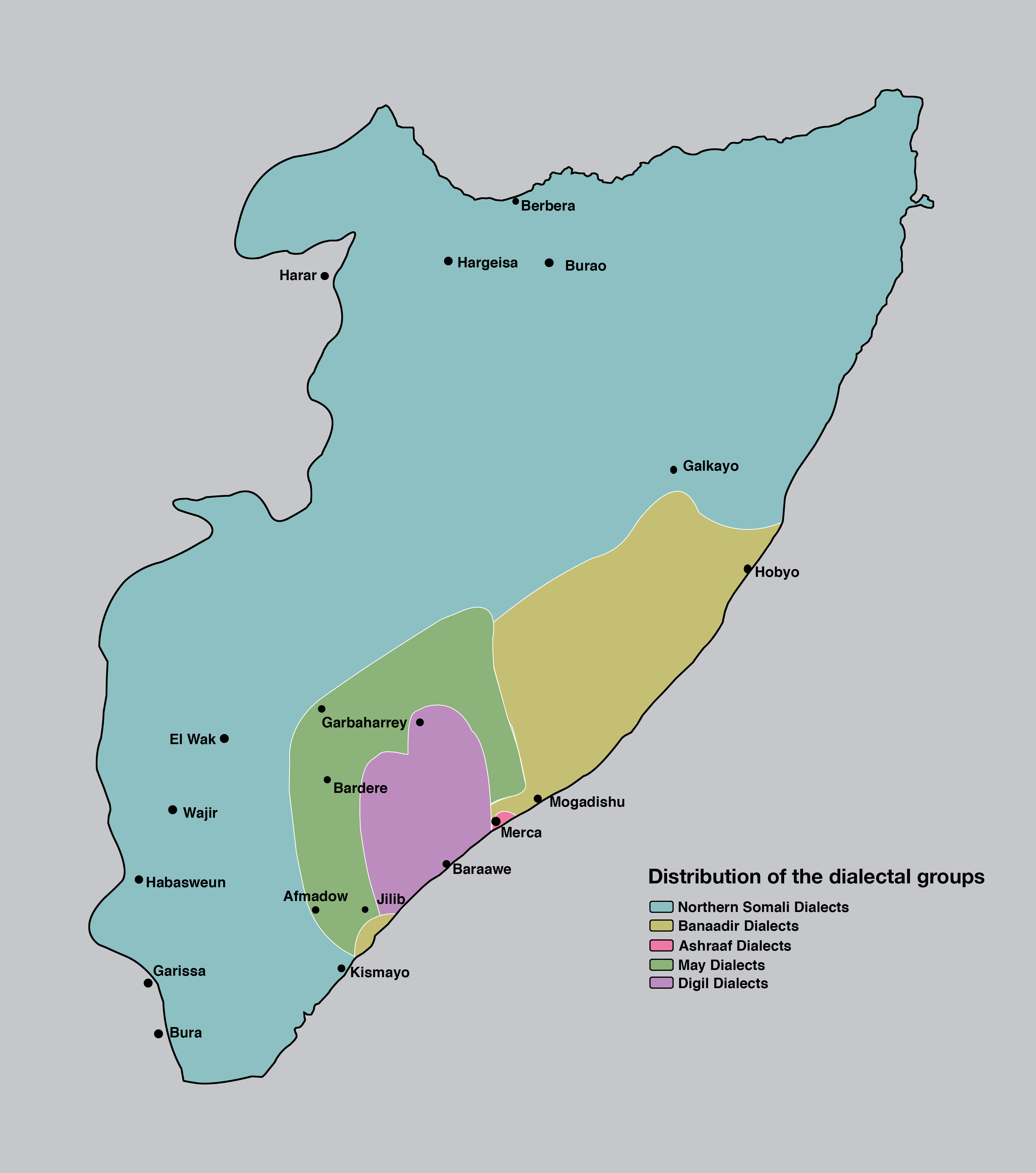
Distribution of Somali dialectal groups in the Horn of Africa

The Somali languages are broadly divided into three main groups: Northern Somali, Benadir and Maay. Northern Somali forms the basis for Standard Somali. It is spoken by the majority of the Somali population with its speech area stretching from Djibouti, and the Somali Region of Ethiopia to the Northern Frontier District. This widespread modern distribution is a result of a long series of southward population movements over the past ten centuries from the Gulf of Aden littoral. Lamberti subdivides Northern Somali into three dialects: Northern Somali proper (spoken in the northwest; he describes this dialect as Northern Somali in the proper sense), the Darod group (spoken in the northeast and along the eastern Ethiopia frontier; greatest number of speakers overall), and the Lower Juba group (spoken by northern Somali settlers in the southern riverine areas). The sub dialect of Northern Somali that the Isaaq speak has the highest prestige of any other Somali dialect.

Speech sample in Standard Somali (an Islamic discourse containing many Arabic loanwords)

Benadir (also known as Coastal Somali) is spoken on the central Indian Ocean seaboard, including Mogadishu. It forms a relatively smaller group. The dialect is fairly mutually intelligible with Northern Somali.

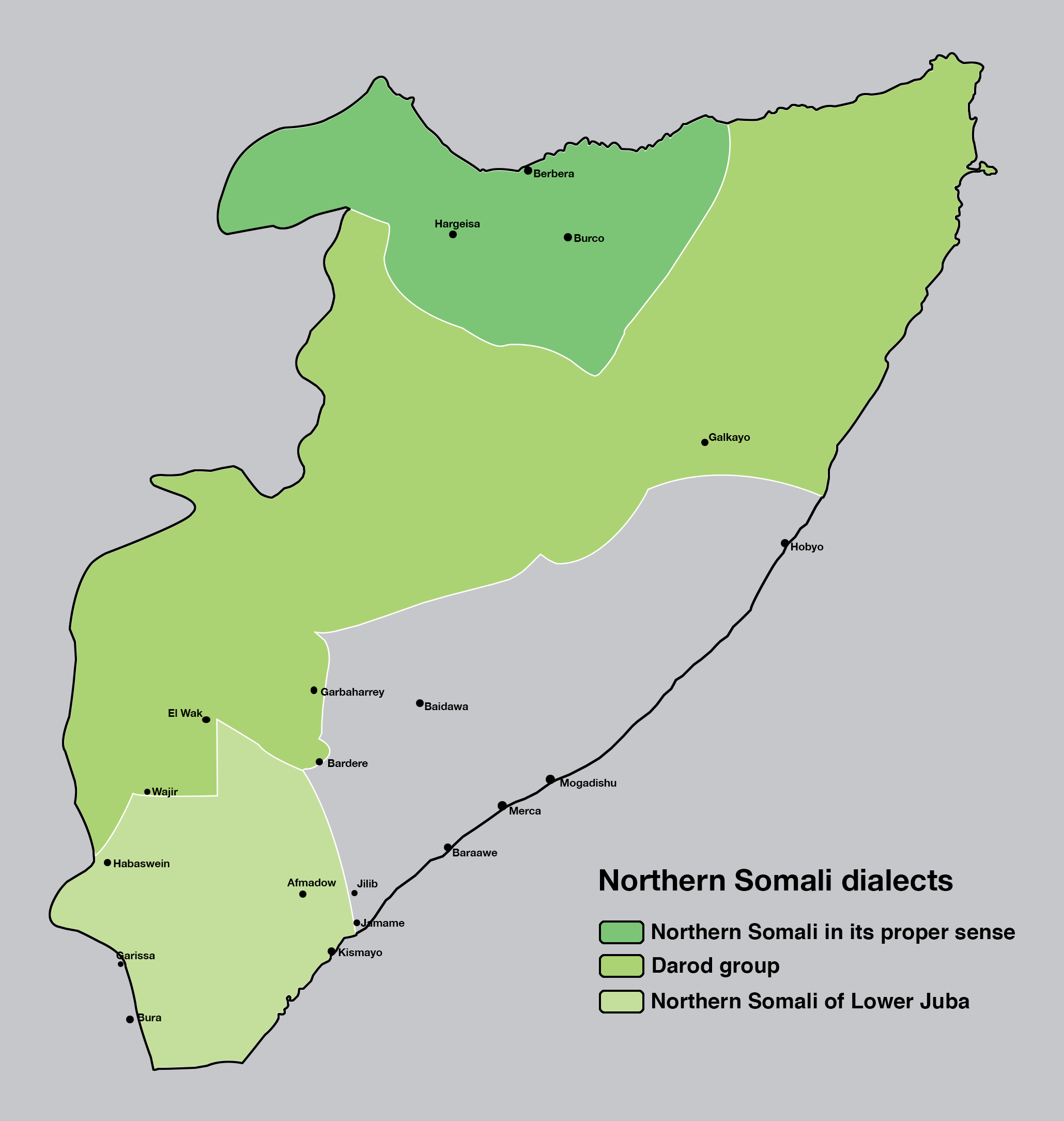
Northern Somali (Nsom) dialect subgroups

Maay is principally spoken by the Digil and Mirifle (Rahanweyn) clans in the southern regions of Somalia. Its speech area extends from the southwestern border with Ethiopia to a region close to the coastal strip between Mogadishu and Kismayo, including the city of Baidoa. Maay is partially mutually comprehensible with Northern Somali, with the degree of divergence comparable to that between Spanish and Portuguese. Despite these linguistic differences, Somali speakers collectively view themselves as speaking a common language. It is also not generally used in education or media. However, Maay speakers often use Standard Somali as a lingua franca, which is learned via mass communications, internal migration and urbanization.

== Phonology ==
=== Vowels ===
Monophthongs of Somali on a vowel chart, from Saeed (1993)

Somali has five vowel articulations that all contrast murmured and harsh voice as well as vowel length. There is little change in vowel quality when the vowel is lengthened. Each vowel has a harmonic counterpart, and every vowel within a harmonic group (which notably can be larger than a word in Somali) must harmonize with the other vowels. The Somali orthography, however, does not distinguish between the two harmonic variants of each vowel.

Different analyses have proposed somewhat different vowel inventories and features for Somali, depending on the set of speakers whose dialects are studied. Up to four features may be phonologically distinctive: height, backness, tongue root, and length.

Saeed (1982) and Orwin (1994) both propose systems with five core vowels, but only Orwin's system makes a tongue root distinction. Gabbard (2010) proposes a system with six core vowels, with a tongue root distinction, but only on front vowels.

Vowels (based on Orwin's analysis)
	Front	Central	Back
High	i (Note: The short vowel i is sometimes lowered to a, for example; “Falastiin” Somali pronunciation: [falastiːn], lit. 'Palestine'. Also when we see “Sidee Tahay” Somali pronunciation: [sadĕː tahaj], lit. 'How are you?', it is clear that it is merely dialectical.) ⟨i⟩ iː ⟨ii⟩		u (Note: The short vowel u is sometimes lowered to a, for example; “Jamhuuriyadda” Somali pronunciation: [d͡ʒamhuːrijada], lit. 'Republic' but however, it is clear that it is merely dialectical southerly.) ⟨u⟩ uː ⟨uu⟩
Mid	e ⟨e⟩ eː ⟨ee⟩		o ⟨o⟩ oː ⟨oo⟩
Low		a ⟨a⟩ aː ⟨aa⟩	

Orwin argues that, in addition to the vowels listed above, each of these five vowels has a fronted (advanced tongue root) variant, based on the existence of minimal pairs such as:

- duul ("fly!") vs. du̘u̘l ("attack!")
- keen ("bring!") vs. ke̘e̘n ("he brought")

Somali monophthongs
	Front series		Back series	
	short	long	short	long
Close front unrounded / Near-close near-front unrounded	i	iː	ɪ	ɪː
Close-mid front unrounded / Open-mid front unrounded	e	eː	ɛ	ɛː
Near-open front unrounded / Open back unrounded	æ	æː	ɑ	ɑː
Open-mid central rounded / Open-mid back rounded	ɞ	ɞː	ɔ	ɔː
Close central rounded / Close back rounded	ʉ	ʉː	u	uː

Somali diphthongs
First element is front		First element is back	
short	long	short	long
æi	æːi	ɑɪ	ɑːɪ
æʉ	æːʉ	ɑu	ɑːu
ei	eːi	ɛɪ	ɛːɪ
ɞi	ɞːi	ɔɪ	ɔːɪ
ɞʉ	ɞːʉ	ɔu	ɔːu

Gabbard claims that only the front vowels (/i/ and /e/) have advanced variants, though his system includes a sixth vowel, /ɑ/. Both Orwin and Gabbard agree that the precise phonetic and phonological difference between the advanced and retracted tongue root vowels are unclear.

=== Consonants ===
Somali has 22 consonant phonemes.

Somali consonant phonemes
		Bilabial	Coronal	Post- alveolar	Velar	Uvular	Pharyn- geal	Glottal
Nasal		m ⟨m⟩	n ⟨n⟩					
Plosive	voiceless		t̪ ⟨t⟩		k ⟨k⟩	q ⟨q⟩		ʔ ⟨'⟩
Plosive	voiced	b ^{†} ⟨b⟩	d̪ ^{†} ⟨d⟩	ɖ ⟨dh⟩	ɡ ^{†}⟨g⟩			
Affricate				d͡ʒ ⟨j⟩				
Fricative	voiceless	f ⟨f⟩	s ⟨s⟩	ʃ ⟨sh⟩	x ⟨kh⟩	(χ) (Note: /q/ is pronounced [χ] as a syllable coda, as in the word aqri (read).)	ħ ⟨x⟩	h ⟨h⟩
Fricative	voiced						ʕ ⟨c⟩	
Trill			r ⟨r⟩	(ɽ) (Note: /ɖ/ is pronounced [ɽ] intervocally.)				
Approximant			l ⟨l⟩	j ⟨y⟩	w ⟨w⟩			

^† The consonants /b d̪ ɡ/ often lenite to [β̞ ð ɣ] intervocalically.

The retroflex plosive /ɖ/ may have an implosive quality for some Somali Bantu speakers, and intervocalically it can be realized as the flap [ɽ]. Some speakers produce /ħ/ with epiglottal trilling as /ʜ/ in retrospect. /q/ is often epiglottalized.

The letter ⟨dh⟩ is pronounced as a retroflex flap [ɽ] when it occurs intervocalically, as in qudhaanjo.

The letter ⟨kh⟩, found in Arabic loanwords, is rarely pronounced as a velar fricative. It is more often conflated with /q/, which is pronounced [χ] in syllabic coda position.

=== Tone ===
Pitch is phonemic in Somali, but it is debated whether Somali is a pitch accent, or it is a tonal language. Andrzejewski (1954) posits that Somali is a tonal language, whereas Banti (1988) suggests that it is a pitch system.

=== Phonotactics ===
The syllable structure of Somali is (C)V(C).

Root morphemes usually have a mono- or di-syllabic structure.

Clusters of two consonants do not occur word-initially or word-finally, i.e., they only occur at syllable boundaries. The following consonants can be geminate: /b/, /d/, /ɖ/, /ɡ/, /ɢ/, /m/, /n/, /r/ and /l/. The following cannot be geminate: /t/, /k/ and the fricatives.

Two vowels cannot occur together at syllable boundaries. Epenthetic consonants, e.g. [j] and [ʔ], are therefore inserted.

== Grammar ==
Somali personal pronouns
Person			Emphatic	Clitic (short)	
Person			Emphatic	Subject	Object
1	singular		aniga	aan	i
1	plural	inclusive	innaga	aynu	ina
1	plural	exclusive	annaga	aannu	na
2	singular		adiga	aad	ku
2	plural		idinka	aydin	idin
3	singular	masculine	isaga	uu	--
3	singular	feminine	iyada	ay	--
3	plural		iyaga	ay	--

=== Morphology ===
Somali is an agglutinative language, and also shows properties of inflection. Affixes mark many grammatical meanings, including aspect, tense and case.

Somali has an old prefixal verbal inflection restricted to four common verbs, with all other verbs undergoing inflection by more obvious suffixation. This general pattern is similar to the stem alternation that typifies Cairene Arabic.

Somali has two sets of pronouns: independent (substantive, emphatic) pronouns and clitic (verbal) pronouns. The independent pronouns behave grammatically as nouns, and normally occur with the suffixed article -ka/-ta (e.g. adiga, "you"). This article may be omitted after a conjunction or focus word. For example, adna meaning "and you..." (from adi-na). Clitic pronouns are attached to the verb and do not take nominal morphology. Somali marks clusivity in the first person plural pronouns; this is also found in a number of other East Cushitic languages, such as Rendille and Dhaasanac.

As in various other Afro-Asiatic languages, Somali is characterized by polarity of gender, whereby plural nouns usually take the opposite gender agreement of their singular forms. For example, the plural of the masculine noun dibi ("bull") is formed by converting it into feminine dibi. Somali is unusual among the world's languages in that the object is unmarked for case while the subject is marked, though this feature is found in other Cushitic languages such as Oromo.

=== Syntax ===
Somali is a subject–object–verb (SOV) language. It is largely head final, with postpositions and with obliques preceding verbs. These are common features of the Cushitic and Semitic Afroasiatic languages spoken in the Horn region (e.g. Amharic). However, Somali noun phrases are head-initial, whereby the noun precedes its modifying adjective. This pattern of general head-finality with head-initial noun phrases is also found in other Cushitic languages (e.g. Oromo), but not generally in Ethiopian Semitic languages.

Somali uses three focus markers: baa, ayaa and waxa(a), which generally mark new information or contrastive emphasis. Baa and ayaa require the focused element to occur preverbally, while waxa(a) may be used following the verb.

== Vocabulary ==
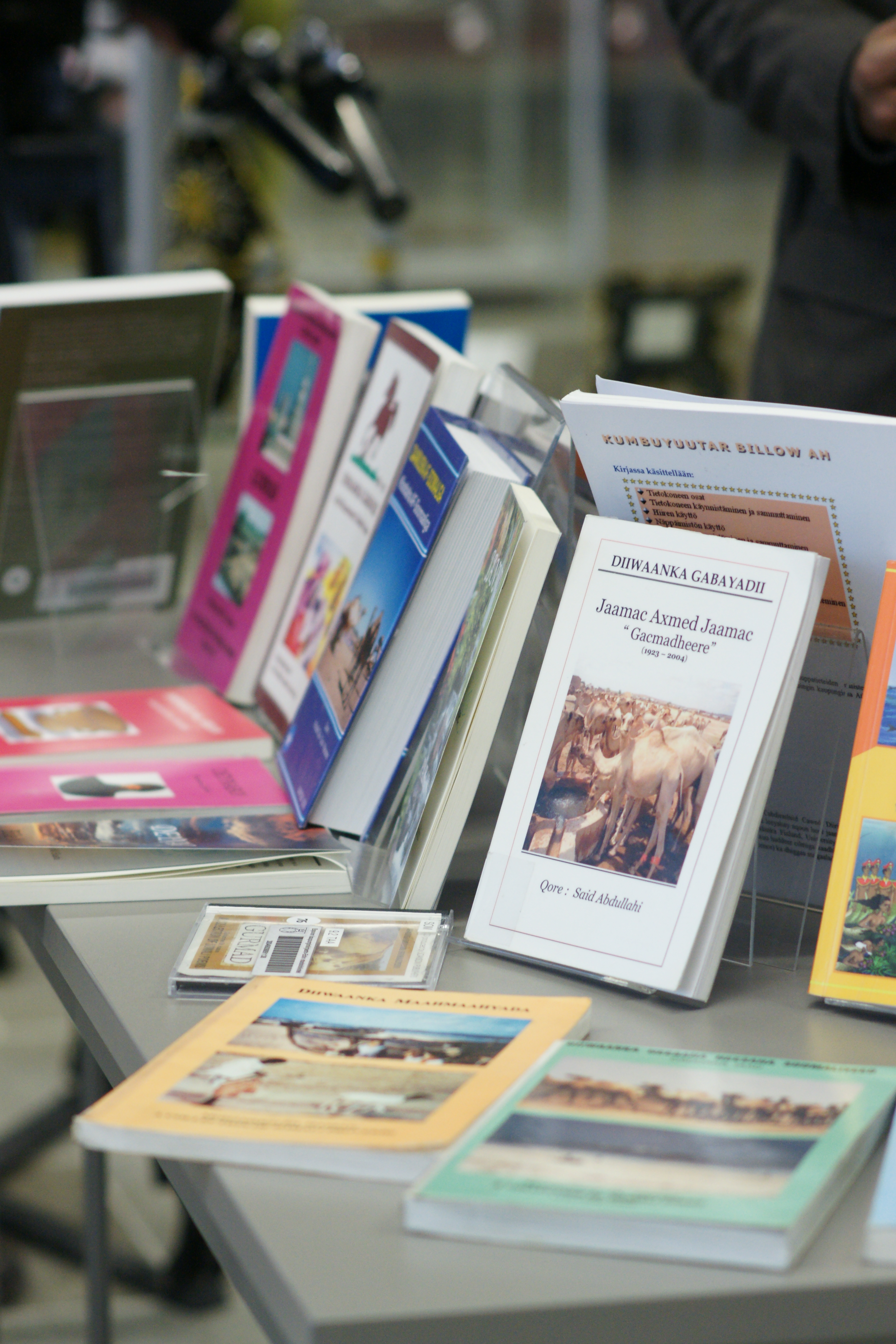
Somali language books on display.

Somali loanwords can be divided into those derived from other Afroasiatic languages (mainly Arabic), and those of Indo-European extraction (mainly Italian).

Somali's main lexical borrowings come from Arabic, and are estimated to constitute about 20% of the language's vocabulary. This is a legacy of the Somali people's extensive social, cultural, commercial and religious links and contacts with nearby populations in the Arabian peninsula. Arabic loanwords are most commonly used in religious, administrative and education-related speech (e.g. aamiin for "faith in God"), though they are also present in other areas (e.g. kubbad-da, "ball"). Soravia (1994) noted a total of 1,436 Arabic loanwords in Agostini a.o. 1985, a prominent 40,000-entry Somali dictionary. Most of the terms consisted of commonly used nouns. These lexical borrowings may have been more extensive in the past since a few words that Zaborski (1967:122) observed in the older literature were absent in Agostini's later work. In addition, the majority of personal names are derived from Arabic.

Somali also contains a few Indo-European loanwords that were retained from the colonial period. Most of these lexical borrowings come from English and Italian and are used to describe modern concepts (e.g. telefishinka, "the television"; raadiyaha, "the radio"). There are 300 loan words from Italian, such as garawati for "tie" (from Italian cravatta), dimuqraadi from democratico (democratic), mikroskoob from microscopio, and so on.

In addition, Somali contains lexical terms from Persian, Urdu and Hindi that were acquired through historical trade with communities in the Near East and South Asia (e.g. khiyaar "cucumber" from Persian: خيار khiyār ). Other loan words have also displaced their native synonyms in some dialects (e.g. jabaati "a type of flat bread" from Hindi: चपाती chapāti displacing sabaayad). Some of these words were also borrowed indirectly via Arabic.

As noted by the Somali historian Mohammed Nuuh Ali, Somali also incorporates various loanwords from Old Harari.

As part of a broader governmental effort of linguistic purism in Somali, the past few decades have seen a push in Somalia toward replacement of loanwords in general with their Somali equivalents or neologisms. To this end, the Supreme Revolutionary Council during its tenure officially prohibited the borrowing and use of English and Italian terms.

== Writing system ==
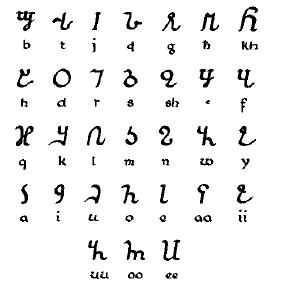
The Osmanya writing script for Somali.

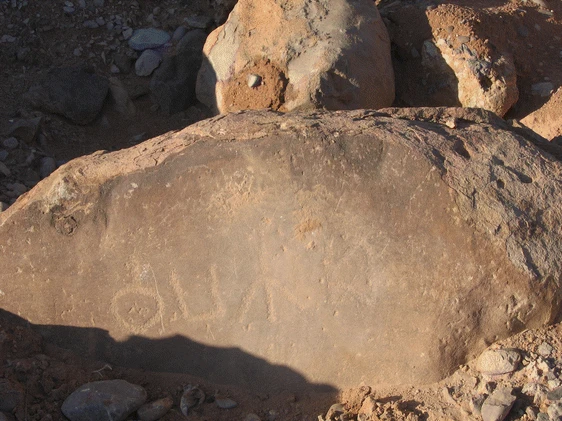
Shaláw Sabaean writing, Sanaag. Inscription dates between 900 BCE and 300 CE.

Archaeological excavations and research in Somalia uncovered ancient inscriptions in a distinct writing system. In an 1878 report to the Royal Geographical Society of Great Britain, the scientist Johann Maria Hildebrandt noted upon visiting the area that "we know from ancient authors that these districts, at present so desert, were formerly populous and civilised[...] I also discovered ancient ruins and rock-inscriptions both in pictures and characters[...] These have hitherto not been deciphered." According to the 1974 report for Ministry of Information and National Guidance, this script represents the earliest written attestation of Somali.

Much more recently, the Somali archaeologist Sada Mire has published ancient inscriptions found throughout Somalia. As for much of Somali linguistic history the language was not widely used for literature, Mire's publications however prove that writing as a technology was not foreign nor scarce in the region. These pieces of writing are from the Semitic Himyarite and Sabaean languages that were largely spoken in what is modern day Yemen —"there is an extensive and ancient relationship between the people and cultures of both sides of the Red Sea coast" Mire posits. Yet, while many more such ancient inscriptions are yet to be found or analyzed, many have been "bulldozed by developers, as the Ministry of Tourism could not buy the land or stop the destruction".

Besides Ahmed's Latin script, other orthographies that have been used for centuries for writing Somali include the long-established Arabic script and Wadaad's writing. According to Bogumił Andrzejewski, this usage was limited to Somali clerics and their associates, as sheikhs preferred to write in liturgical Arabic Various such historical manuscripts in Somali nonetheless exist, which mainly consist of Islamic poems (qasidas), recitations and chants. Among these texts are the Somali poems by Sheikh Uways and Sheikh Ismaaciil Faarah. The rest of the existing historical literature in Somali principally consists of translations of documents from Arabic.

Since then a number of writing systems have been used for transcribing Somali. Of these, the Somali Latin alphabet, officially adopted in 1972, is the most widely used and recognised as official orthography of the state. The script was developed by a number of leading scholars of Somali, including Musa Haji Ismail Galal, B. W. Andrzejewski and Shire Jama Ahmed specifically for transcribing Somali, and uses all letters of the English Latin alphabet except p, v and z. There are no diacritics or other special characters except the use of the apostrophe for the glottal stop, which does not occur word-initially. There are three consonant digraphs: DH, KH and SH. Tone is not marked, and tense and lax vowels (which may really be a tongue root distinction) are not distinguished.

Writing systems developed in the twentieth century include the Osmanya, Borama, and Kaddare alphabets, which were invented by Osman Yusuf Kenadid, Abdurahman Sheikh Nuur, and Hussein Sheikh Ahmed Kaddare, respectively.

== Resources ==
Several digital collections of texts in the Somali language have been developed in recent decades. These corpora include Kaydka Af Soomaaliga (KAF), Bangiga Af Soomaaliga, the Somali Web Corpus (soWaC), a Somali read-speech corpus, Asaas (Beginning in Somali) and a Web-Based Somali Language Model and text Corpus called Wargeys (Newspaper in Somali).

== Numbers and calendrical terms ==
=== Numbers ===
English	Somali		
English	Latin	Osmanya	#
Zero	Eber	𐒗𐒁𐒗𐒇	𐒠
One	kow	𐒏𐒙𐒓	𐒡
Two	laba	𐒐𐒖𐒁𐒖	𐒢
Three	saddex	𐒈𐒖𐒆𐒆𐒗𐒄	𐒣
Four	afar	𐒖𐒍𐒖𐒇	𐒤
Five	shan	𐒉𐒖𐒒	𐒥
Six	lix	𐒐𐒘𐒄	𐒦
Seven	toddoba	𐒂𐒙𐒆𐒆𐒙𐒁𐒖	𐒧
Eight	siddeed	𐒈𐒘𐒆𐒆𐒜𐒆	𐒨
Nine	sagaal	𐒈𐒖𐒌𐒛𐒐	𐒩
Ten	toban	𐒂𐒙𐒁𐒖𐒒	𐒡𐒠

English	Somali		
English	Latin	Osmanya	#
Eleven	kow iyo toban	𐒏𐒙𐒓 𐒘𐒕𐒙 𐒂𐒙𐒁𐒖𐒒	𐒡𐒡
Twelve	laba iyo toban	𐒐𐒖𐒁𐒖 𐒘𐒕𐒙 𐒂𐒙𐒁𐒖𐒒	𐒡𐒢
Thirteen	saddex iyo toban	𐒈𐒖𐒆𐒆𐒗𐒄 𐒘𐒕𐒙 𐒂𐒙𐒁𐒖𐒒	𐒡𐒣
Fourteen	afar iyo toban	𐒖𐒍𐒖𐒇 𐒘𐒕𐒙 𐒂𐒙𐒁𐒖𐒒	𐒡𐒤
Fifteen	shan iyo toban	𐒉𐒖𐒒 𐒘𐒕𐒙 𐒂𐒙𐒁𐒖𐒒	𐒡𐒥
Sixteen	lix iyo toban	𐒐𐒘𐒄 𐒘𐒕𐒙 𐒂𐒙𐒁𐒖𐒒	𐒡𐒦
Seventeen	toddoba iyo toban	𐒂𐒙𐒆𐒆𐒙𐒁𐒖 𐒘𐒕𐒙 𐒂𐒙𐒁𐒖𐒒	𐒡𐒧
Eighteen	sideed iyo toban	𐒈𐒘𐒆𐒜𐒆 𐒘𐒕𐒙 𐒂𐒙𐒁𐒖𐒒	𐒡𐒨
Nineteen	sagaal iyo toban	𐒈𐒖𐒌𐒛𐒐 𐒘𐒕𐒙 𐒂𐒙𐒁𐒖𐒒	𐒡𐒩
Twenty	labaatan	𐒐𐒖𐒁𐒛𐒂𐒖𐒒	𐒢𐒠

For all numbers between 11 kow iyo toban and 99 sagaashal iyo sagaal, it is equally correct to switch the placement of the numbers, although larger numbers is some dialects prefer to place the 10s numeral first. For example 25 may both be written as labaatan iyo shan and shan iyo labaatan (lit. Twenty and Five & Five and Twenty).

Although neither the Latin nor Osmanya scripts accommodate this numerical switching.

=== Multiples of 10 ===
English	Somali		
English	Latin	Osmanya	#
Ten	toban	𐒂𐒙𐒁𐒖𐒒	𐒡𐒠
Twenty	labaatan	𐒐𐒖𐒁𐒛𐒂𐒖𐒒	𐒢𐒠
Thirty	soddon	𐒈𐒙𐒆𐒆𐒙𐒒	𐒣𐒠
Forty	afartan	𐒖𐒍𐒖𐒇𐒂𐒖𐒒	𐒤𐒠
Fifty	konton	𐒏𐒙𐒒𐒂𐒙𐒒	𐒥𐒠
Sixty	lixdan	𐒐𐒘𐒄𐒆𐒖𐒒	𐒦𐒠
Seventy	toddobaatan	𐒂𐒙𐒆𐒆𐒙𐒁𐒛𐒂𐒖𐒒	𐒧𐒠
Eighty	siddeetan	𐒈𐒘𐒆𐒆𐒜𐒂𐒖𐒒	𐒨𐒠
Ninety	sagaashan	𐒈𐒖𐒌𐒛𐒉𐒖𐒒	𐒩𐒠

=== Names of large numbers ===
English	Somali		
English	Latin	Osmanya	#*
One hundred	boqol	𐒁𐒙𐒎𐒙𐒐	𐒡𐒠𐒠
One thousand	kun	𐒏𐒚𐒒	𐒡,𐒠𐒠𐒠
One million	milyan	𐒑𐒘𐒐𐒕𐒖𐒒	𐒡,𐒠𐒠𐒠,𐒠𐒠𐒠
One billion	bilyan	𐒁𐒘𐒐𐒕𐒖𐒒	𐒡,𐒠𐒠𐒠,𐒠𐒠𐒠,𐒠𐒠𐒠

*the commas in the Osmanya number chart are added for clarity

=== Days of the week ===
English	Somali	
English	Latin	Osmanya
Sunday	Axad	𐒖𐒄𐒖𐒆
Monday	Isniin	𐒘𐒈𐒒𐒕𐒒
Tuesday	Salaasa/Talaado	𐒈𐒖𐒐𐒛𐒈𐒖/𐒂𐒖𐒐𐒛𐒆𐒙
Wednesday	Arbaca/Arbaco	𐒖𐒇𐒁𐒖𐒋𐒛/𐒖𐒇𐒁𐒖𐒋𐒙
Thursday	Khamiis	𐒅𐒖𐒑𐒕𐒈
Friday	Jimce/Jimco	𐒃𐒘𐒑𐒋𐒙
Saturday	Sabti	𐒈𐒖𐒁𐒂𐒘

=== Months of the year ===
English	Somali	
English	Latin	Osmanya
January	Janaayo	𐒃𐒜𐒒𐒚𐒓𐒖𐒇𐒘
February	Febraayo	𐒍𐒛𐒁𐒇𐒚𐒓𐒖𐒇𐒘
March	Maarso	𐒑𐒛𐒃
April	Abriil	𐒖𐒁𐒇𐒕𐒐
May	Maajo	𐒑𐒖𐒕
June	Juun	𐒃𐒓𐒒
July	Luuliyo	𐒃𐒓𐒐𐒛𐒕
August	Agoosto	𐒝𐒌𐒖𐒈
September	Sebteembar	𐒈𐒘𐒁𐒂𐒖𐒑𐒁𐒖𐒇
October	Oktoobar	𐒙𐒏𐒂𐒝𐒁𐒖𐒇
November	Nofeembar	𐒒𐒝𐒍𐒖𐒑𐒁𐒖𐒇
December	Diseembar	𐒆𐒕𐒈𐒑𐒁𐒖𐒇

== Computational linguistics ==
In recent years, the Somali language has become the subject of research in computational linguistics due to its complex morphology and low-resource status. Efforts have been made to develop lemmatization, part-of-speech tagging, and automatic speech recognition systems for Somali.

== See also ==
- Languages of Djibouti
- Languages of Somalia
- Languages of Kenya
- Somali Sign Language
- Somali literature
- Somali studies
