= Tunni language =

Somali language spoken by the Tunni

Tunni
- Af-Tunni
- Native to: Somalia
- Region: Lower Shabelle, Middle Juba
- Ethnicity: Tunni Somalis
- Native speakers: 34,000 (2020)
- Language family: Afro-Asiatic: Cushitic; Lowland East; Somali; Digil; Tunni

Language codes
- ISO 639-3: tqq
- Glottolog: tunn1238
- ELP: Tunni

Tunni (also known as Af-Tunni) is a Somali language spoken by the Tunni who reside in the Lower Shebelle, Middle Juba, Lower Juba and part of Bay regions in southern Somalia. The language is typically classified among the Digil group of Somali languages. Tunni is distinct from Somali, with a different phonology and sentence structure.

== Phonology ==
Just like in other Somali varieties, Tunni is a tonal accent language, in which tone is determined primarily morphosyntactically.

Differences from somali include

1. Short /ɛ/ to /i/
2. /ħ/ to /ʔ/
3. /d(ː)/ to /j(ː)/ before long /ɛː/

== Vocabulary ==
=== Numerals ===
The tunni numerals are

1. ków	21. labaatón i ków *
2. lámma	22. labaatón i lámma
3. síddiʔ	23. labaatón i síddiʔ
4. áfar	24. labaatón i áfar
5. ʃán	25. labaatón i ʃán
6. líʔ	26. labaatón i líʔ
7. toddóbo	27. labaatón i toddóbo
8. siyéed	28. labaatón i siyéed
9. saɡáal	29. labaatón i saɡáal
10. tómon	30. sóddon
11. tómon i ków *	40. áffartón
12. tómon i lámma	50. kóntón
13. tómon i síddiʔ	60. lihdón
14. tómon i áfar	70. toddobátan
15. tómon i ʃán	80. siyyéetan
16. tómon i líʔ	90. saɡáaʃan
17. tómon i toddóbo	100. boqol
18. tómon i siyéed	200.
19. tómon i saɡáal	1000. kún
20. labaatón	2000.
