= Somali languages =

Language group of East Africa

Somali
- Geographic distribution: Somalia, Djibouti, Ethiopia, Kenya
- Native speakers: 27 million (2020)
- Linguistic classification: Afro-Asiatic: Cushitic; Lowland East; Macro-Somali; Somali
- Proto-language: Proto-Somali
- Subdivisions: Ashraf; Benadiri; Maay Maay; Northern Somali

Language codes
- Glottolog: None east2653 East Omo–Tana (partial match)

The Somali languages form a group that are part of the Afro-Asiatic language family. They are spoken as a mother tongue by ethnic Somalis in Horn of Africa and the Somali diaspora. Even with linguistic differences, Somalis collectively view themselves as speaking dialects of a common language.

Some neighboring populations and individuals have also adopted the languages. Somali is for instance used as a second language by speakers of Girirra.

== Overview ==
Somali variations form a group of East Cushitic languages that are part of the Afroasiatic language family. Their closest relatives are the Aweer and Garre languages, followed by Rendille; this group is sometimes known as Sam or Eastern Omo-Tana. Together with Bayso and the Arboroid languages such as Daasanach, these are known as the Omo-Tana languages. A term "Somaloid" is ambiguous and has been used for either all of Omo-Tana, for the Sam group, or for a group comprising Sam and Baiso.

- Afroasiatic
  - Semitic languages, Ancient Egyptian, etc.
  - Cushitic
    - Beja, Agaw languages, etc.
    - East Cushitic
      - Highland East Cushitic
      - Lowland East Cushitic
        - Oromo, Afar, etc.
        - Omo-Tana languages
          - Arboroid languages
          - Bayso
          - Sam / East Omo-Tana
            - Rendille
            - East Sam
              - Aweer–Garre
              - Somali languages

== Classification ==
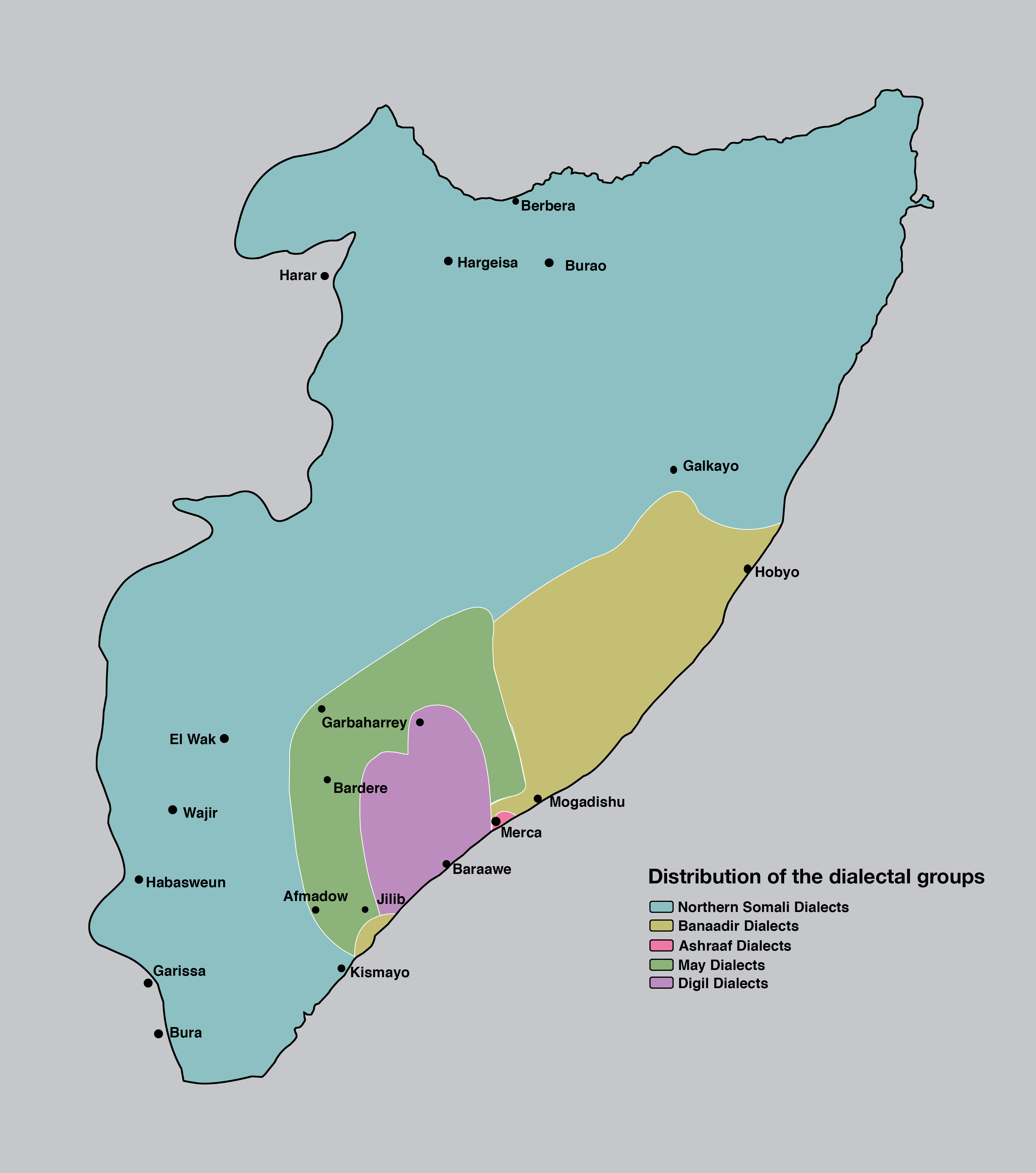
Distribution of Somali dialectal groups in the Horn of Africa

Somali linguistic varieties are broadly divided into three main groups: Northern, Benadir and Maay. Northern Somali forms the basis for Standard Somali.

The most extensive publication on the subject is Marcello Lamberti's 'Die Somali-Dialekte'. Both Lamberti (1986) and Blench (2006) separate Central and Benadir into two distinct groups, Digil and Maay and Benadir and Ashraf, respectively:

- Somali
  - Northern
  - Benadir
  - Ashraf
  - Maay
  - Digil

=== Northern ===
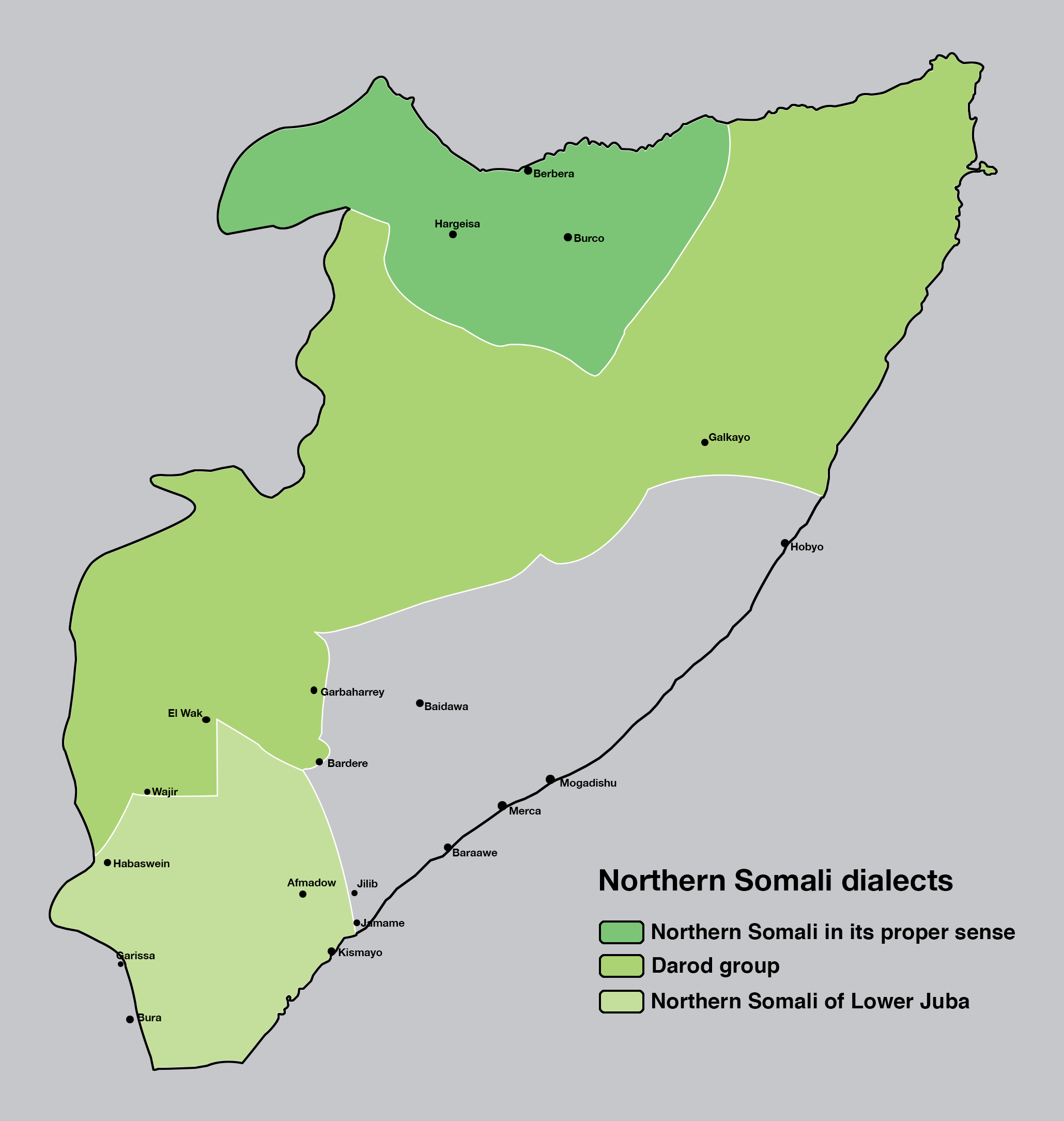
Northern Somali (Nsom) dialect subgroups

Northern Somali is spoken by more than 70% of the entire Somali population. Its primary speech area stretches from Djibouti, Somaliland and to parts of the eastern and southwestern sections of Somalia. This widespread modern distribution is a result of a long series of southward population movements over the past ten centuries from the Gulf of Aden littoral. Northern Somali is subdivided into three dialects: Northern Somali proper (spoken in the northwest), the Darod group or Jabarti (spoken in the northeast and along the eastern Ethiopia frontier), and the Lower Juba group (spoken by northern Somali settlers in the southern riverine areas). Northern Somali has frequently been used by famous Somali poets as well as the political elite, and thus has the most prestige out of the Somali dialects. Due to being wide spread, it forms the basis for Standard Somali. Most of the classical Somali poetry is recited and composed in the Northern Somali dialect.

Lamberti divides Northern Somali into three subgroups:

- Northern Somali proper: spoken in the countries of Djibouti and Somaliland (Awdal, Maroodi Jeex, Saaxil, Togdheer, Sanaag and Sool). The dialects belonging to this group are the Issa, Gadabuursi, Isaaq and the northern Darod (Warsangeli and Dulbahante). The greatest number of speakers overall.
- Darod group: spoken in the regions of Bari, Nugal, Mudug, in the Somali Region of Ethiopia and along the Ethiopian border in the regions of Galguduud, Bakool and Gedo. The dialects of this group are the North-Eastern dialects (Majeerteen, Marehan, Leelkase, Awrtable, and Ogaden).
- Lower Juba group: spoken by the part of the Northern Somali population which have immigrated into the Lower Juba region in the last 100/150 years. As this territory was a Benaadir-speaking area before the arrival of the immigrants from the north, the Nsom of Lower Jubba presents many peculiarities typical for the Benaadir dialects and could be considered a Benaadirised Nsom.

=== Coastal ===
Coastal Somali (also grouped as Benadir and Ashraf) is spoken on the Benadir coast from Hobyo to south of Merca, including Mogadishu and in the hinterland.

- Coastal:
  - Benadiri
    - Northern
    - Southern
  - Ashraaf
    - Shingani
    - Lower Shabbelle

=== Central ===
Central Somali (also grouped as Digil and Maay) is spoken in the inter-riverine regions of Somalia by the Digil and Mirifle clans, collectively known as the Rahanweyn Somalis. They are most often described as dialects whilst others regard them as being divergent from Somali as Spanish is to Portuguese. Of the Central variations, Jiiddu is the most incomprehensible to Benadir and Northern speakers.

- Central:
  - Digil
    - Tunni
    - Garre
    - Dabarre
  - Maay
    - Northern
    - Bur Hakaba

There are other languages that are spoken in Somalia which are not necessarily Afsoomali. They may be a mixture of the Somali languages and other indigenous languages. Such a language is Maay which is principally spoken by the Digil and Mirifle (Rahanweyn or Sab) clans in the southern regions of Somalia. Its speech area extends from the southwestern border with Ethiopia to a region close to the coastal strip between Mogadishu and Kismayo, including the city of Baidoa. Maay is not mutually comprehensible with Northern Somali, and it differs in sentence structure and phonology. It is also not generally used in education or media. However, Maay speakers often use Standard Somali as a lingua franca, which is learned via mass communications, internal migration and urbanization.

Maay is not closely related with the Somali language in sentence structure and phonology. Its Jiddu, Dabarre, Garre and Tunni varieties are also spoken by smaller Rahanweyn communities. Collectively, these languages present similarities with Oromo that are not found in mainstream Somali. Chief among these is the lack of pharyngeal sounds in the Rahanweyn/Digil and Mirifle languages, features which by contrast typify Somali but are not Somali. Although in the past frequently classified as dialects of Somali, more recent research by the linguist Mohamed Diriye Abdullahi has shown that these varieties, including Maay, constitute separate Cushitic languages. The degree of divergence is comparable to that between Spanish and Portuguese. Of the Digil varieties, Jiddu is the most incomprehensible to Benadir and Northern speakers. Despite these linguistic differences, Somali speakers collectively view themselves as speaking a common language.

=== Other ===
In addition, Kirk (1905) reports Yibir and Midgan, spoken by the Yibir and Madhiban, respectively. Blench (2006) says, "These lects, spoken respectively by magicians and hunters among the Somali are said to differ substantially in lexicon from standard Somali. Whether this differentiation is in the nature of a code or these represent distinct languages remains unknown."

=== Other groupings ===
The classification found in Ehret & Ali (1984) differs sharply from others. Ehret & Ali classify these varieties into three main groups in a more genealogically focused approach:

- Soomaali
  - Bayso-Jiddu
    - Bayso
    - Jiddu
  - Soomaali II
    - Rendille
    - Soomaali III
      - Garre-Aweer
        - Garre
        - Aweer
      - Juba
        - Tunni
        - Bardheere (= Dabarre?)
      - Soomaali IV
        - Maay
        - Banaadir-Northern (including Ashraf Somali)

Jiiddu in this model is relocated as not even a Somali sensu lato variety in origin, but instead as a sibling of Bayso. In contrast, Garre shows quite close affinity to Aweer, a language spoken by the Aweer people, who are distinct in culture and appearance. Evidence suggests that the Aweer/Boni are remnants of the early hunter-gatherer inhabitants of Eastern Africa. According to linguistic, anthropological and other data, these groups later came under the influence and adopted the Afro-Asiatic languages of the Eastern and Southern Cushitic peoples who moved into the area.

== Reconstruction ==
Proto-Somali has been reconstructed by Biber (1982).
