= Regional Somali Language Academy =

Regulating body for the Somali language

Intergovernmental Academy of Somali Language
Intergovernmental overview
- Formed: June 2013
- Type: Language regulator
- Jurisdiction: Djibouti, Somalia, Ethiopia, Kenya and Somaliland.
- Headquarters: Mogadishu Somalia

The Intergovernmental Academy of Somali Language (abbr. AGA) is an Intergovernmental Academy of Somali Language in the Horn of Africa, established by the governments of Djibouti, Somalia, Ethiopia, Kenya and Somaliland. As of February 2015, it is based in Mogadishu.

== Overview ==
On 26 June 2013, the governments of Djibouti, Somalia, Ethiopia, Kenya and Somaliland, launched the Intergovernmental Academy Of Somali Languagea ceremony in Djibouti City. The event was organized by Djibouti's Ministry of Islamic Affairs, Culture and Waqf in conjunction with the Somali-Speaking PEN Centre of Djibouti, and was attended by around 50 prominent Somali-speaking intellectuals from the region and elsewhere. Among the guests were Somalia's Minister of Information, Posts and Telecommunications Abdullahi Elmoge Hersi, Somaliland’s Minister of Culture Abiib Diriye Nur, and the Vice President of the Somali Region of Ethiopia Abdihakim Igal Omar.

In January 2015, President of Somalia Hassan Sheikh Mohamud announced that the Regional Somali Language Academy was slated to be finalized in conjunction with the governments of Djibouti and Ethiopia. Among the scheduled projects was the construction of a new headquarters for the Academy in Mogadishu, in recognition of Somalia's traditional position as the center for the development and promotion of the Somali language. In February 2015, the foundation stone for the new Regional Somali Language Academy was officially laid at an inauguration ceremony in Mogadishu attended by President Mohamud, President of Djibouti Ismaïl Omar Guelleh, federal cabinet ministers, legislators and delegates.

The academy is the first such regional language regulator for Somali. It is officially mandated with preserving the Somali language.
