= Dabarre language =

Somali language of Somalia

Dabarre
- Af-Dabarre
- Native to: Somalia
- Region: Bay, Lower Shabelle, Middle Juba
- Ethnicity: Somali (Dabarre)
- Native speakers: 34,000 (2020)
- Language family: Afro-Asiatic: Cushitic; Lowland East; Somali; Digil; Dabarre
- Dialects: Dabarre; Iroole

Language codes
- ISO 639-3: dbr
- Glottolog: daba1260

Dabarre (also known as Af-Dabarre) is a Somali language spoken by the Dabarre and Ciroole, both sub-clans of the Digil clan family of Somalis inhabiting southwestern Somalia. It has an estimated 34,000 speakers. Dialects include Dabarre and Iroole (Af-Iroole).
