= Rendille language =

Afro-Asiatic language of Kenya

Rendille
- Afi Renꞌdille
- Native to: Kenya
- Region: Eastern Province
- Ethnicity: Rendille
- Native speakers: 96,000 (2019 census)
- Language family: Afro-Asiatic: Cushitic; Lowland East; Rendille–Boni; Rendille
- Writing system: Latin

Language codes
- ISO 639-3: rel
- Glottolog: rend1243

Rendille (also known as Rendile, Randile) is an Afro-Asiatic language spoken by the Rendille people inhabiting northern Kenya. It is part of the family's Cushitic branch.

The Ariaal sub-group of the Rendille, who are of mixed Nilotic and Cushitic descent, speak the Nilo-Saharan Samburu language of the Samburu Nilotes, near whom they live.

== Phonology ==
=== Consonants ===
		Labial	Dental/ alveolar	Retroflex	Post-alv./ Palatal	Velar	Uvular	Pharyngeal	Glottal
Nasal		m	n̪		ɲ	ŋ			
Plosive/ Affricate	voiceless		t̪		tɕ	k	(q)		ʔ
Plosive/ Affricate	voiced	b	d̪	ɖ	dʑ	g			
Fricative		f	s			x		ħ ~ ʕ	h
Lateral			l						
Trill			r						
Glide		w			j				

- /tɕ/ can be heard as [ɕ] by some speakers.
- Some speakers always pronounce /x/ as a uvular stop [q].
- [ʕ] can be heard as a free variant of /ħ/, or when /ħ/ is heard in intervocalic position.
- Voiced sounds become voiceless when in word-final position.
- /b/ can be pronounced as [p] when preceding /ħ/, or as a fricative [β] in intervocalic position.
- /r/ can also freely be devoiced as [r̥] in word-initial position, and is always heard as devoiced in word-final position.
- /d̪/ can freely be heard as an affricate [d̪ð], and can also be heard as a fricative [ð] in intervocalic position.
- /x/ can also be heard as an affricate [qχ] when following nasal sounds.

=== Vowels ===
	Front	Central	Back
Close	i iː		u uː
Mid	e eː		o oː
Open		a aː	

- Vowels /i, u, e, o/ are commonly heard as lax [ɪ, ʊ, ɛ, ɔ].

== Alphabet ==
The Rendille alphabet has 26 letters:

Rendille alphabet
Letter	A	B	Ch	D	Dh	E	F	G	H	H'	I	J	K
Letter	a	b	ch	d	dh	e	f	g	h	h'	i	j	k
Phoneme	/a/	/b/	/tʃ/	/ɖ/	/d̪/	/e/	/f/	/g/	/ħ/	/h/	/i/	/ʤ/	/k/
Letter	Kh	L	M	N	Ng'	Ny	O	R	S	T	U	W	Y
Letter	kh	l	m	n	ng'	ny	o	r	s	t	u	w	y
Phoneme	/x/	/l/	/m/	/n/	/ŋ/	/ɲ/	/ɔ/	/r/	/s/	/t/	/u/	/w/	/j/

Long vowels are written doubled. Tone is phonemic, and high tone can be written as an acute accent ( ́), while low tone is not marked.
