= Maay Maay =

Somali dialect

Mai-Mai
- Af- Mai-Mai
- Native to: Somalia
- Region: Bakool, Bay, Middle Juba, Lower Shabelle, Gedo, Hiran
- Ethnicity: Gosha, Rahanweyn Somalis
- Native speakers: 2.75 million (2020)
- Language family: Afro-Asiatic: Cushitic; Lowland East; Somali; Mai-Mai
- Dialects: Maay Erte (Central Somali), Maay Dhete (Af-Goshe, Af-Shambarro, Lower Juba Maay, Mahaway), Af-Helledi
- Writing system: Maay alphabet (Latin script)

Official status
- Official language in: Somalia

Language codes
- ISO 639-3: ymm
- Glottolog: maay1238
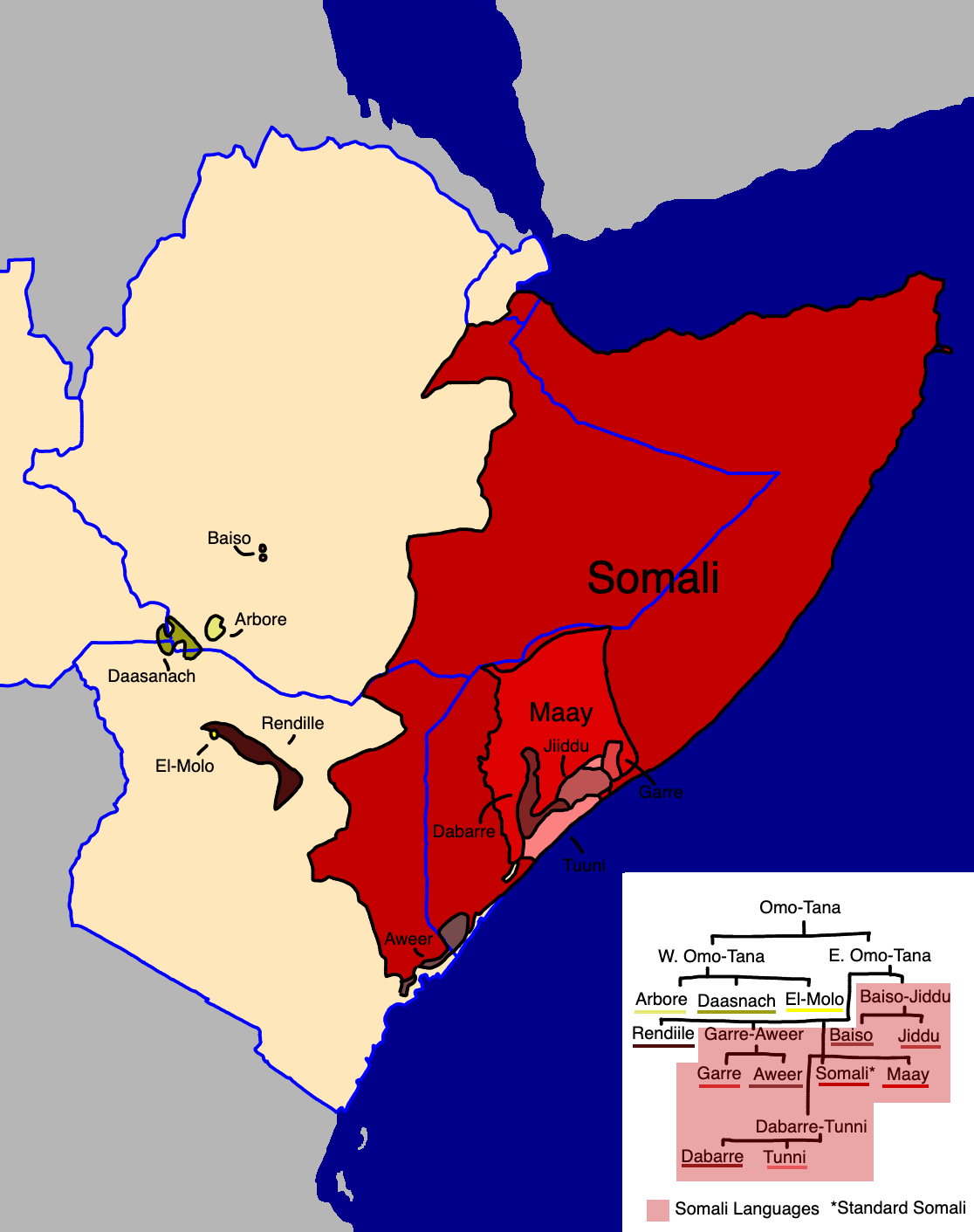

Mai, commonly spelled Maay (also known as Af-Maay, Af-Maay, or simply Maay) is a dialect of the Somali language. It is mainly spoken in Somalia and adjacent parts of Ethiopia and Kenya. In Somalia, it is spoken in South West state, Jubaland state, and Banadir.

== Overview ==
Somali linguistic varieties are divided into three main groups: Northern, Benadir, and Maay. Northern Somali (or Northern-Central Somali) forms the basis for Standard Somali.

Maay is principally spoken by the Digil and Mirifle (Rahanweyn) clans in the southern regions of Somalia. Its speech area extends from the southwestern border with Ethiopia to a region close to the coastal strip between Mogadishu and Kismayo, including the city of Baidoa. Maay is partially mutually comprehensible with Northern Somali, with the degree of divergence comparable to that between Spanish and Portuguese. Despite these linguistic differences, Somali speakers collectively view themselves as speaking a common language. It is also not generally used in education or media. However, Maay speakers often use Standard Somali as a lingua franca, which is learned via mass communications, internal migration and urbanization.

Although past scholars have maintained the assumption that Maay is not mutually comprehensible with Northern Somali it was done so without it being tested for. A more recent study by Deqa Hassan tested the mutual intelligibility between Af-Maay and Af-Maxaa speakers (Northern Somali).

The study found that Af-Maay is partially mutually intelligible to Af-Maxaa (Northern Speakers) and that intelligibility increases with increased understanding of Standard Somali. Which implies understanding of standard Somali (Northern Somali) increases the chance of understanding Af-Maay. This accounts for the most significant linguistic factor that ties both language variations together. Therefore Af-Maay is categorized as a Type 5 dialect for the overlapping common cultural history it shares with Af Maxaa speakers which explains its somewhat mutual intelligibility.

== Grammar ==
=== Phonology ===
==== Consonants ====
Consonants of Lower Jubba Maay
		Bilabial	Labio- dental	Dental	Alveolar	Palato- alveolar	Palatal	Velar	Glottal
Stop	voiceless	(p)		t̪				k	ʔ
Stop	voiced	b		d̪				ɡ	
Stop	implosive				ɗ		ʄ	ɠ	
Affricate						dʒ			
Fricative		[β]	f	[ð]	s	ʃ		[ɣ]	h
Nasal		m		n̪			ɲ	[ŋ]	
Rhotic					r				
Lateral					l				
Approximant		w					j		

- A nasal consonant preceding a /n̪/ will always be realized as a [ŋ], e.g., aaŋ-ni 'we ate' from underlying /aam-ni/.
- [ɣ] is an intervocalic allophone of /ɡ/.

==== Vowels ====
Vowels of Lower Jubba Maay
	Front	Central	Back
Close	i iː		u uː
Mid	e eː		o oː
Open		a aː	

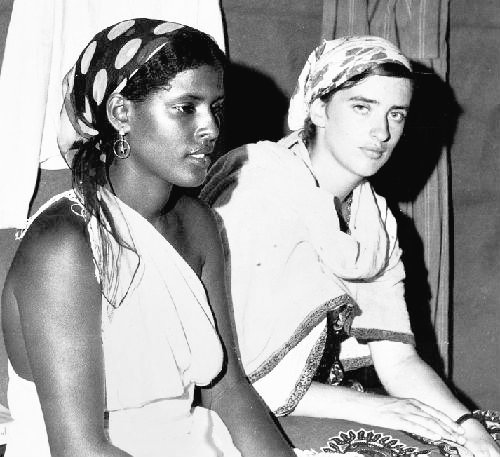
British ethnologist Virginia Luling who wrote extensively on Maay dialect and poetry

Maay Maay exhibits significant amounts of epenthesis, inserting central or high-central vowels to break up consonant clusters. Vowel length is contrastive; minimal pairs such as bur 'flour' and buur 'mountain' are attested.

=== Words ===
Maay Maay is fairly agglutinative. It has complex verb forms, inflecting at least for tense/aspect and person/number of both subject and object. There is also a prefix indicating negation. In addition, verbs exhibit derivational morphology, including a causative and an applicative. Nominal morphology includes a definiteness suffix, whose form depends on the gender of the head noun, and possessive suffixes.

=== Sentences ===
Maay Maay exhibits SVO and SOV word orders, apparently in fairly free variation. When the object is postverbal, the prefix maay appears on the verb. Within the noun phrase, the head noun is generally initial. Possessors, adjectives and some strong quantifiers follow the head noun. Numerals and the indefinite quantifier precede the head noun.

=== Poetry ===
Maay has retained a rich oral tradition and evocative poetry that differs from the more well-known northern style. In southern Somalia, the poet and reciter would be one and the same. British ethnologist Virginia Luling noted during her visit to Afgooye that poetry was to be conceived and recited simultaneously with no prior preparation. The poets or Laashin relied on their wit and memory to construct poems and entertain the audience.

Geledi Laashins during Luling's 1989 stay in Afgooye sang about the ever-present issue of land theft by the Somali government. The Sultan in these poems was asked to help the community and reminded of his legendary Gobroon forefathers of the centuries prior.

The poem The law then was not this law was performed by the leading Laashins of Afgooye, Hiraabey, Muuse Cusmaan and Abukar Cali Goitow alongside a few others, addressed to the current leader Sultan Subuge. It evoked the memories of the mighty Geledi Sultanate of years prior and was a sharp contrast to their current situation.

Here the richest selection of the poem

Ganaane gubow gaala guuriow Gooble maahinoo Geelidle ma goynin
Gembi iyo waran guraantiis aa loogu soo gayooday, Gooble
Gacalkiisa guri curad aa looga soo guuray Haddana nin walba aa
Soo gamgamohaayo, goofka beereed waa la goostay, gelgeshii
Gaashada daaqeysana waa la goostay, gunta intee la geyn doonaa?
Gobroontii soo gaartay Gobroontaan ma ahayn, gargooye Ibraahim
Cumar Xaaji goodaalka adunyada markii joogeen, Awow Gaduud Cali -
Mahinoo - Awow Gaduud Cali Abukar, Yusuf Maxamuud iyo goodaalka
Addunka markii joogeen, ganuunka ganuunkan ma ahayn, Awow
Gudgudoome Cumar Adeerow goodaalka aduunka markii joogeen
Ganuunka ganuunkan ma ahayn. Beereed waa la goostay, gelgeshii
Gaasha la la goostay, gaasha intee loola guuraa ?

Ganaane gubowow, gaala guuriow-aa
Gelgeshii la goostay go'aan maad ka gaart-aa (gaartay) ?

— Abubakr Cali Goitow The law then was not this law
Translation:

You who burnt Ganaane and chased away the infidels
Did you not separate from the Geelidle and come to Gooble (Afgooye)?
We endured war and the point of the spear
For the love of Gooble we left our first home
And now everyone crowds in here, they have taken our cleared farmland
They have taken the pasture where the herds grazed - where will the people be led ?
The Gobroon who first arrived here are not these Gobroon
When the giver of judgment Ibraahim Cumar Xaaji the pillar of the world was alive and Aw Gaduud Cali
Is it not so ? - Aw Gaduud Cali Abukar, and Yusuf Maxamuud the pillar of the world
While they were alive the law was not this law
When the giver of decisions Aw Cumar Adeerow was in the world the law was not this law
Now everyone crowds in, they have taken the cleared farmland,
They have taken the pasture of the herds where will we move the herds?

You who burnt Ganaane and chased away the infidels
Have you reached a decision about the stolen pastures?

== Sources ==
- Saeed, John (1999). Somali. Amsterdam: John Benjamins. ISBN 1-55619-224-X.
