= Lowland East Cushitic languages =

Group of Cushitic languages of East Africa

Lowland East Cushitic
- Geographic distribution: Horn of Africa
- Linguistic classification: Afro-Asiatic: Cushitic; East Cushitic; Lowland East Cushitic
- Subdivisions: Oromoid; Somaloid; Omo–Tana; ? Baiso; Saho–Afar; ? Dahalo; ? South; ? Ongota; ? Yaaku; ? Dullay; ? Boon

Language codes
- Glottolog: lowl1267

Lowland East Cushitic is a group of roughly two dozen diverse languages of the Cushitic branch of the Afro-Asiatic family. Its largest representatives are Oromo and Somali.

== Classification ==
Lowland East Cushitic classification from Tosco (2020:297):

- Lowland East Cushitic
  - Saho–Afar
  - Southern
    - Nuclear
      - Omo–Tana
      - Oromoid
    - Peripheral (?)
      - Dullay
      - Yaaku

Highland East Cushitic is a coordinate (sister) branch with Lowland East Cushitic in Tosco's (2020) classification.

"Core" East Cushitic classification from Bender (2020 [2008]: 91). Saho–Afar is excluded, making it equivalent to Tosco's Southern Lowland East Cushitic, and Yaaku is moved into Western Omo–Tana ("Arboroid"):

- 'Core' East Cushitic
  - Dullay
  - SAOK
    - Eastern Omo–Tana (Somaloid)
    - Western Omo–Tana (Arboroid) [incl. Yaaku]
    - Oromoid (Oromo–Konsoid)

Highland East Cushitic and Afar–Saho are coordinate (sister) branches with Lowland East Cushitic, together forming East Cushitic.

== Overview ==
Lowland East Cushitic is often grouped with Highland East Cushitic (the Sidamic languages plus Burji), Dullay, and Yaaku as "East Cushitic", but that group is not well defined and considered dubious.

The most spoken Lowland East Cushitic language is Oromo, with about 35 million speakers in Ethiopia and Kenya. The Konsoid dialect cluster is closely related to Oromo. Other prominent languages include Somali (spoken by ethnic Somalis in Somalia, Somaliland, Ethiopia, Djibouti, and Kenya) with about 30 million speakers, and Afar (in Ethiopia, Eritrea and Djibouti) with about 1.5 million.

Robert Hetzron has suggested that the Rift languages ("South Cushitic") are a part of Lowland East Cushitic, and Kießling & Mous (2003) have suggested more specifically that they be linked to a Southern Lowland branch, together with Oromo, Somali, and Yaaku–Dullay.

The vocabulary of the mixed register of Mbugu (Ma'a) may also be East Cushitic (Tosco 2002), though the grammatical basis and the other register are Bantu.

Unclassified within the Lowland languages are Girirra and perhaps the endangered Boon language.

Savà and Tosco (2003) believe Ongota is an East Cushitic language with a Nilo-Saharan substratum—that is, that Ongota speakers shifted to East Cushitic from an earlier Nilo-Saharan language, traces of which still remain. However, Fleming (2006) considers it to be an independent branch of Afroasiatic.

== See also ==
- Languages of Ethiopia
