= Momba District =

Coordinates: 8.812°S 32.363°E

Momba
- District
- location in Songwe Region
- Country: Tanzania
- Region: Songwe Region

Area
  - Total: 5,856 km^{2} (2,261 sq mi)

Population (2022)
  - Total: 259,781
  - Density: 44.36/km^{2} (114.9/sq mi)

Momba District is a district of Songwe Region, Tanzania. It is bordered to the north by Lake Rukwa, to the south by Zambia, to the east by the Mbozi District, and to the west by the Rukwa Region. It was formed from the western part of Mbozi District when Songwe Region was created from Mbeya Region.

== Administrative subdivisions ==
As of the restructuring in 2016, there are 3 divisions and 14 wards in the district. The wards are:

- Chilulumo
- Chitete
- Ikana
- Ivuna
- Kamsamba
- Kapele
- Mkomba
- Mkulwe
- Mpapa
- Msangano
- Myunga
- Ndalambo
- Nkangamo
- Nzoka
