= Japhet Hasunga =

Tanzanian politician

Honourable Japhet N. Hasunga MP
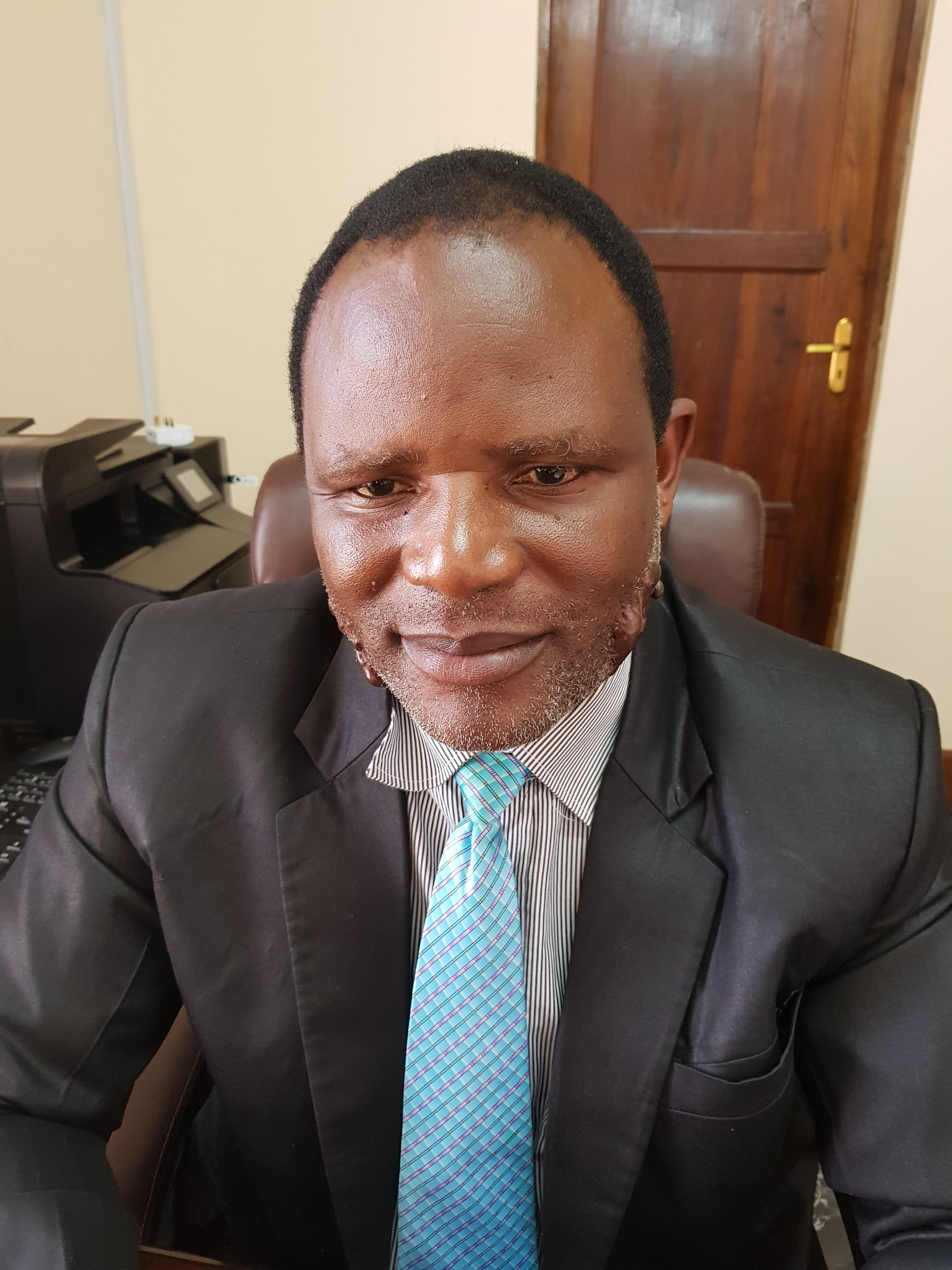

Minister of Agriculture
- In office 10 November 2018 – 16 June 2020
- President: John Magufuli
- Preceded by: Charles Tizeba
- Succeeded by: Adolf Mkenda

Deputy Minister of Natural Resources and Tourism
- In office 7 October 2017 – 10 November 2018
- Minister: Hamisi Kigwangalla

Member of Parliament for Mbozi
- Incumbent
- Assumed office November 2015

Personal details
- Born: 23 November 1965 (age 60)
- Party: CCM
- Education: MSM (MBA)

Japhet Ngailonga Hasunga (born November 23, 1965, in Iyula village, Mbozi District, Tanzania) is a Tanzanian politician through CCM and Member of Parliament for Vwawa constituency since 2015.

== Early life ==
Japhet Ngailonga Hasunga before taking the position he had was insisting on accountability and this proven on the interview with media and his speeches through publications and he stand believably on training and performance.

== Educational background ==
Hasunga early started his way to the world of knowledge where his parents took him to Iyula Primary school that was between 1976 and 1982 and he successfully completed his PCEE and being enabled to another step of Sangu Secondary Education in 1983 to 1986 where he acquire a CSEE, 1987 to 1989 Japhet Ngailonga Hasunga he saw the green light to the higher Education for gaining ASCEE at Mzumbe Secondary School, that was not the last movement of Hasunga, he acquired again a Professional Certificate of Accountancy (CPA) at the National Board of Accountancy that was between 1996 and 1998 its that results make a clear way to Japhet Ngailonga Hasunga, to join the Institute of Development and Management — Mzumbe in 1996 to 1998 where he was awarded an Advance Diploma Certified accountancy. In 1998 to 2001 joined the NBAA and acquiring the master's degree on Accountancy and Audit, Japhet Ngailonga is registered as an Accountant and Auditor. In 2006 to 20077 joined the MSM and being awarded Master Degree (MBA)

== Political career ==
Japhet Ngailonga Hasunga joined with CCM since 2001 as a branch adviser moving from another political party known as NCCR–Mageuzi where he started with National politics in 1992 as by then was appointed as an Administrative Officer in the movements of establishing the party under his good Administration, the party was officially founded and the following year in 1993 being registered as a Political Party with headquarters in Dar es Salaam. In 2001 he decided to join with Chama cha Mapinduzi; in 2015 the NEC of Tanzania was set for general election where Japhet Ngailonga Hasunga with his new political part of Chama cha Mapinduzi was appointed to join the race for member of the parliament to compete with other candidates of opposition political parties and last of a day of that election the people of Vwawa constituency spoken on the urns of polls, Hasunga succeed garnering a total of 36,75 against 35,400 of his near competitor from opposition party with deferents of 1305 votes and according to the lawfully mandate of the NEC, Japhet Ngailonga Hasunga was announced a winner. As a ‘’’Japhet Ngailonga Hasunga’’’ was appointed as Deputy Minister for Ministry of Natural Resources and Tourism in 2017 by the President of the United Republic of Tanzania John Magufuli during the changes he made on 9th of October 2017. He serves under cabinet Minister Dr. Hamisi Kigwangalla.

On November 13, 2018 he was sworn in as Minister of Agriculture, which he served until the parliament was dissolved on 16 June 2020.

== Working experience ==
Work experience
Year	Position	Organization
2014 - 2015	Directorate of Finance	Institute of Financing Management
2013 - 2013	Head of Research and Consultancy department	Tanzania Public Service College
2012 - 2012	Acting Chief Executive	Tanzania Public Service college
2011 - 2013	Deputy Principal of Training, Research and consultancy	Tanzania Public Service College
2008 - 2011	Deputy Principal of Planning Finance and Administration	Tanzania Public Service College
2008 - 2014	Senior Lecturer	Tanzania Public Service College
2003 - 2006	Director of finance and Administration	Tanzania Public service college
2003 - 2015	Lecturer and Consultancy	Tanzania Public service college
2002 - 2002	Acting Treasurer Manager	National Social Security Fund
1998 - 2002	Zonal Accountant	National Social Security Fund
1996 - 1998	Regional Accountant	National Social Security Fund
