= Mwanga people =

Ethnic group from Songwe Region of Tanzania

Nywamwanga
Regions with significant populations
- Tanzania: 87,000
- Zambia: 169,000

Languages
- Nyamwanga & Swahili

Religion
- Majority: Christianity; Minority: African Traditional Religion

Related ethnic groups
- Fipa, Nyiha, Mambwe & other Bantu peoples

Mwanga (or Nyamwanga) are a Bantu ethnic group native to Momba District in Songwe Region of Tanzania and northeastern Zambia. They speak Nyamwanga (also known as Chinamwanga). In 1993, the Mwanga population was estimated to number 256,000, with 169,000 living in Zambia and 87,000 in Tanzania.

== Post colonial dynasties ==
The queen of the Mwanga on the Zambian side, a woman, carries the title of Nawaitwika and is based in Nakonde District in Zambia across the Tanzanian border. Other Kings are Kafwimbi, Muyombe, and Mwenechifungwe. These chiefs have their headquarters in Isoka District. The main traditional ceremonies practiced by the Mwanga are: Vikamkanimba, Ng’ondo, Chambo Chalutanga, and Mulasa.

The first queen appointed as Nawaitwika was Namulinda, she was tasked to rule the Namwanga people on the Zambian side from Nakonde, when she died, Namaipo was appointed as the next Nawaitwika. Following her death in 1940, Malia was appointed as the third Nawaitwika from 1941 to 1999. Malia ruled for over 56 years, making her one of the longest-serving queens in Zambia. After her death, Evelyn, who was born in Zambia and lived in Mufulira with her husband was later appointed as the current Nawaitwika.

The Winamwanga people are believed to have come from North East Africa together with the Tonga/Ila people of Southern province at about 900 BC. Hence some similarities in names between the Tonga’s and Namwanga’s such as Siame in Namwanga and Sianjunza in Tonga. Their lifestyle was a fugal system or nomadic life, meaning that they had no permanent residence. By this time, there were no borders available meaning that the Namwanga’s in Tanzania and Zambia shared everything including leadership.

After the partitioning of boundaries, the headquarters of the Namwanga people remained in Tanganyika or Tanzania under King Mukoma. To this very day, the King of the Namwanga people is based in Tanzania and only appoints a chief from there to rule over the Namwanga’s in Zambia. It is believed that, Chief Nawaitwika's brother rebelled against her because he felt he couldn't be ruled by his sister, hence organised his followers and at night stole the royal drum for his sister's chieftaincy and continued migrating southwards towards present day Isoka. Upon crossing now kalungu river, he and his followers beat the royal drums signalling his installation as chief. Chief Nawaitwika didn't want to fight her own blood brother, and in turn stopped her troops from attacking the break away group and simply said, "walekani wasende ing'oma yawufumu awiwa" (let them take the royal drum they're thieves). Nawaitwika's brother's name was Kafwimbi, and that's how the Kafwimbi chieftaincy was established. And because Nawaitwika said they are thieves (Awiwa), the winamwanga under chief Kafwimbi are called Awiwa or Iwa. The other chief from the Mukoma dynasty settled in Malawi under chief Kameme Siame, ruling over winamwanga of that country. There are other chiefs in Isoka under chief Kafwimbi ie Mwenimpanza, Katyetye etc.

They are a patrilineal people. A Mwinamwanga inherits property, names, and titles through his or her father's line. Modern Winamwanga, however, tend to ignore some of the traditional requirements of patriliny.

== Unique names ==
Winamwanga surnames are unique in that they contain gender signifiers. All the female surnames begin with "Na" while all the male surnames begin with "Si." Unlike other ethnic groups in Zambia, who use such prefixes to mean "father-of" or "mother-of," Winamwanga have the prefixes fixed with their surnames. We see examples of such use in names like Siwale, whose female counterpart is Nawale or Namwila, Simukonda and Namukonda, Sikaundi and Nakaundi, Sichone and Namonje, Sikombe and Nakaponda, Sinkala and Nambela, Sichalwe and Nachalwe, Sikana and Nakana, Simwanza and Nakawala etc. We find similar use of the prefixes among the Mambwe and the Lungu of Mbala and Mpulungu, respectively. Among Winamwanga, females belonging to the royal clan may have a surname totally different from that of the males. For instance, males of the current royal clan carry the name Sikombe, while the females are called Nakaponda and Siyame, while the females are called Nakamba and Simwanza for males while females Nakawala. Among the Mambwe, however, Nayame is the female equivalent of Siyame and Wanjilani is A Special Name Known to The Winamwanga Tribe all female surname's eg like Nakaponda goes with male named Sikombe and other namwanga names end with nji.

== Food ==
Winamwanga grow millet, groundnuts, beans, maize, among other crops. They also rear cattle (a main store of wealth and currency for marriage transactions), sheep, goats, poultry and pigeons. Winamwanga are teased often by members of other ethnic groups for their fondness for kumbi or pupwe, a vegetable with a slippery quality like okra. It is prepared with baking soda or soaked charcoal ashes and mixed with beans. The kumbi is usually mixed with beans and served with nshima, (a thick maize meal porridge) common among Africans.

== Courtship and marriage ==
As among other African cultures, traditional Winamwanga lack a concept of dating. Any form of premarital friendship between young males and females is strictly forbidden. Young people, however, find ways around the restrictions. To declare interest in marrying a woman, a man must give the woman of his interest money or beads, called insalamu. The girl who accepts insalamu indicates thereby that she agrees to the marriage proposal. Still, her parents have to consent to the marriage proposal. The man sends a trusted friend or relative as go-between (kateya wa mpango) to the parents of the woman, to convey his interest in marrying their daughter. If they consent, he pays dowry, more often than not reckoned in terms of number of cattle, but also as cash. If they reject the proposal, the man has to look for another woman to marry. In the case where a man gets a girl pregnant before marriage, the man is required to pay damages on top of regular dowry payments. It is taboo for a woman to propose marriage to a man.

== Religion ==
Most Winamwanga who have adopted Christianity belong to the United Church of Zambia (UCZ. Formerly, the Free Church of Scotland). Others belong to the Catholic Church, the African Methodist Church, Jehovah's Witnesses Seventh-day Adventists mainly originally African black Jews and among many other major religious organisations.

== Politics ==
Welfare Associations or Native Associations in Nyasaland (Malawi) and Northern Rhodesia (Zambia) were formed during the colonial period. In the 1930s and 1940s Welfare Associations were common sight, but the first Welfare Association In Northern Rhodesia was founded at Mwenzo mission station in 1912. The purpose or status of these associations is often discussed as "embryonic political organisations" (Gray 1990:100), "non-political" by former member Pakasa Makasa (1985:31), and described as "indigenous nationalism" by other scholars.

Donald Robert Mengo Siwale, a Namwanga and an inhabitant of Mwenzo and educated at Overtoun Institute in Malawi, was the founder of the Mwenzo Welfare Association. Together with people like Rev. David Kaunda of Lubwa Mission, Hezekiya Nkonjera Kawosa and Peter Sinkala.

== Bibliography ==
- Sinkamba, H.M.F (1984) Imikalile ya Winamwanga, MP P.O. Box 71581 Ndola (Zambia)
- Conflict and interest in a Scottish mission area - North Eastern Zambia 1870 - 1935
