= Bemba people =

Ethnic group in Central Africa

Bemba
AbaBemba
- Flag of the Bemba people

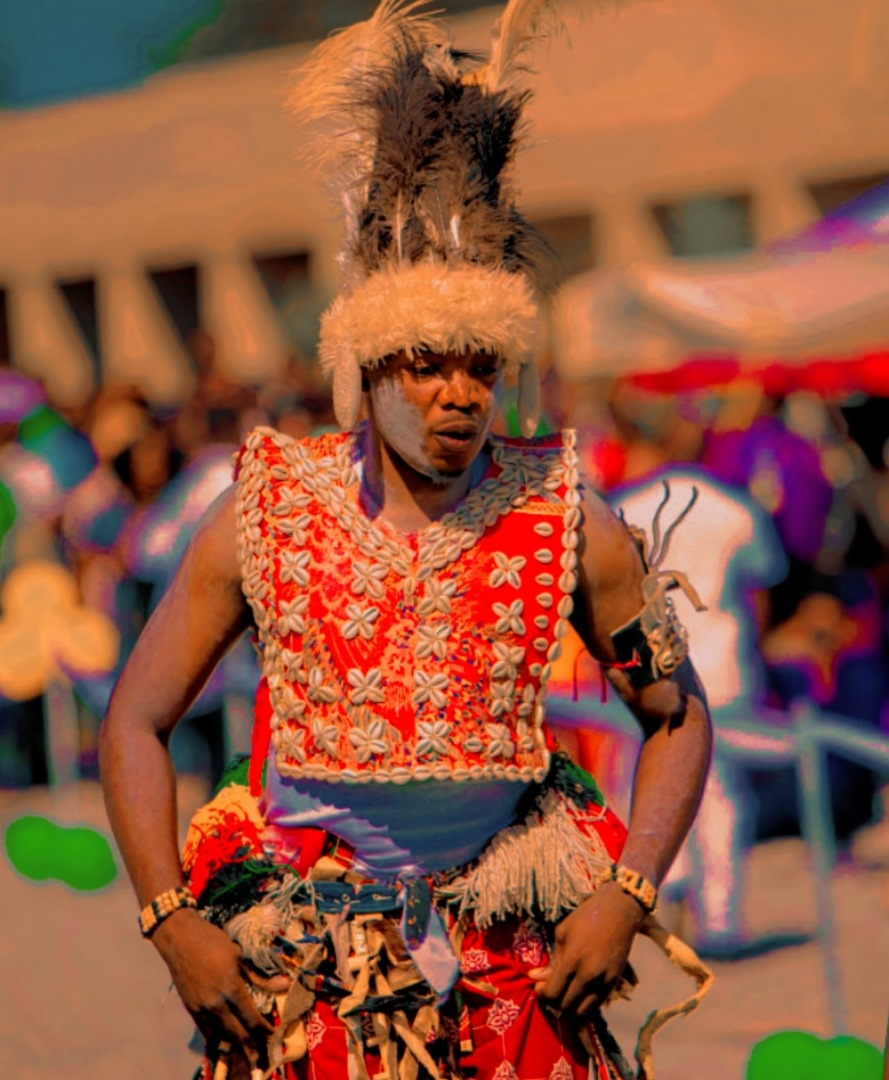
- A UmuBemba wearing a Tongosa Dance costume

Total population
- 6,605,200

Regions with significant populations
- Zambia – 5,864,000 Democratic Republic of the Congo – 696,000; Zimbabwe – 38,000 Tanzania – 6,200

Languages
- Bemba language

Religion
- Christianity, traditional African religions

Related ethnic groups
- Lungu and other Bantu peoples

- Person: UmuBemba
- People: AbaBemba, Awemba, BaWemba
- Language: IchiBemba
- Country: Kulubemba

The Bemba belong to a large group of Bantu peoples, primarily in the Northern, Luapula, Muchinga and the northern Central Province of Zambia. The Bemba entered Zambia before 1740 by crossing the Luapula River from Kola. Several other ethnic groups in the northern and Luapula regions of Zambia speak languages which are similar to Bemba, but have different origins. The Bemba people are not indigenous to Copperbelt Province; they arrived there during the 1930s due to employment opportunities in copper mining.

Living in villages of 100 to 200 people, they numbered 250,000 in 1963. The ethnicities known today as the Bemba have a ruling clan known as Abena Ng'andu. The traditional AbaBemba (the Bemba people) of Zambia in Central Africa are Bantus.

== History ==
=== Early history ===
Much of known Bemba history, particularly their early history, is a synthesis of several sources. It includes Bemba oral traditions, historical texts on early imperial and colonial ventures and post-Berlin Conference European exploration in the region, inferences from mentions of Bemba individuals, associations with historical writings on other Central African kingdoms, and Bemba-focussed historiography of the past century.

Recent groundbreaking scholarship by Nicholas Katanekwa has combined archaeological evidence with linguistic data to unravel a more precise origin of the various Bantu groups.

The Bemba are one of the west-central branch of the Western Bantu peoples. The west-central Bantu are distinguished from the southwest Bantu and eastern Bantu by their matrilineal traditions, as well as a tradition of keeping mainly goats and sheep, rather than cattle, due to their long migration through the heavily forested Congo Basin.

The ancestors of the Bemba (and most of the peoples of Zambia) made their way slowly up the various tributaries of the Congo. One branch, the proto-Sabi (ancestors of the Bemba, Chewa and possibly Botatwe) moved up (south) the Lualaba river valley. According to Katanekwa, the proto-Botatwe and proto-Chewa peoples had likely split from the proto-Sabi peoples (among whom the Bemba are counted) before the earliest settlement of the Upemba depression, the source of the Lualaba river and considered a homeland for the nascent Luba and Sabi peoples ("Pemba" in Luba has a similar meaning to "Bemba" in Chibemba).

Archaeological research shows that the Upemba Depression had been occupied continuously since at least the 4th century AD. In the 4th century, the region was occupied by iron-working farmers. Over the centuries, the people of the region learned to use nets, harpoons, make dugout canoes, and clear canals through swamps. They had also learned techniques for drying fish, which were an important source of protein; they began trading the dried fish with the inhabitants of the protein-starved savanna.

By the 6th century, fishing people lived on lakeshores, worked iron, and traded palm oil.

By the 10th century, the people of Upemba had diversified their economy, combining fishing, farming and metal-working. Metal-workers relied on traders to bring them the copper and charcoal that they needed in smelting. Traders exported salt and iron items, and imported glass beads and cowry shells from the distant Indian Ocean. At this time, according to John Thornton, social stratification and governance began to form.

By the 14th century, Vansina says that "Lords of the land" held priestly roles due to their special relationship with the spirits of the land and were widely recognised, holding sway over multiple villages and essentially ruling embryonic kingdoms. As lineages grew in size, authority was opportunistically absorbed or incorporated by force, leading to the formation of states.

European researchers suggest a 17th-century anti-Portuguese rebellion in the Kingdom of Luba led to another eastward movement of the Bemba. The rebels were led by two of Luba King Mukulumpe’s sons: Nkole and Chiti. The mother of Nkole and Chiti was Mumbi Lyulu Mukasa of the Bena-Ng'andu clan, which has become the royal Bemba clan. A crocodile (ing'wena in modern Bemba; ing'andu in old Bemba) is the clan's totem. In the royal archives (babenye) at the palace of the Chitimukulu are four Christian statues obtained 600 years ago from early Catholic missionaries in the Kongo Kingdom.

Katanekwa suggests modern Bemba identity derives from Luba royalty establishing rulerships over various Sabi peoples; the Bemba language had come to be used as a trade lingua franca for the Sabi peoples, and consequently, as the Bemba language spread among closely related Sabi peoples, the Bemba identity grew to include tribes which were previously considered distinct (including Lala, Bisa, etc.).

The Bemba migrated from the Luba Kingdom, crossed the Luapula River, and settled at Isandulula (below Lake Mweru), at Keleka near Lake Bangweulu, Chulung'oma, and then at Kashi-ka-Lwena. They then crossed the Chambeshi River at Safwa Rapids and settled at Chitabata, Chibambo, Ipunga, Mungu, and Mulambalala. They crossed the Chambeshi River again, moving back west to Chikulu. A royal omen at the Milando River reportedly compelled the Bemba to settle (Mushindo, 1977; Tanguy, 1948; Tweedie, 1966). This settlement, Ng'wena, became the first capital of the Bemba Kingdom. The 19th-century Bemba-Ngoni wars were fought in the region around Ng'wena.

The Bemba were said to have been ruled by a single chief or king (Roberts, 1970, 1973; Tanguy, 1948). During the reign of the 22nd Chitimukulu at the end of the 18th century, they became more expansionist; Chitimukulu Mukuka wa Malekano began pushing the Lungu people out of the present-day Kasama area. When he forced the Lungu to move west and settle on the western side of the Luombe River, the Bemba Kingdom had become too large to manage from UluBemba. Chitimukulu Mukuka wa Malekano gave the newly-acquired Ituna area to his young brother, Chitundu, and the Mwamba Kingdom was a tributary state of the Bemba Kingdom (Mushindo, 1977; Tanguy, 1948). Chitundu became Mwine Tuna, Mwamba I.

=== After 1808 ===
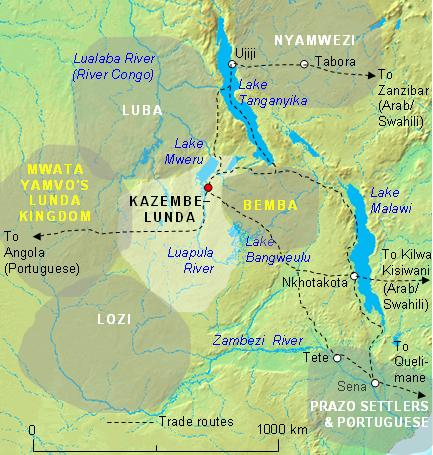
The Kazembe kingdom at its zenith, during the first half of the 19th century

Under the 23rd Chitimukulu Chilyamafwa AbaBemba, expansion continued until 1808. Chitimukulu pushed the Mambwe people north to a region which would be called Mpanda. Chitimukulu Chilyamafwa’s young brother, Mubanga Kashampupo, who had ascended to the Mwamba throne as Mwine Tuna Mwamba II, continued pushing the Lungu west and south to the Kalundu region. Chitimukulu Chilyamafwa created a vassal Mpanda kingdom over which his son, Nondo-mpya, would reign as Makasa I; Mwamba Kashampupo created a vassal Kalundu kingdom over which his son would rule as Munkonge I (Tanguy, 1948). Bemba kings continued the conquests, with Chileshe Chepela (1810-1860) and Mutale Chitapankwa (1866-1887) bringing nearby tribes under their rule.

By the time the first European presence began to make itself known in Zambia at the end of the 1800s, the Bemba had pushed out many earlier immigrants (including the Tabwa, Bisa, Lungu, and Mambwe) to the Tanganyika plateau. They extended to varying degrees as far north as Lake Tanganyika, south-west to the swamps of Lake Bangweulu, eastwards to the Muchinga Escarpment and Luangwa Valley, and west to Lake Mweru. The Bemba were subdivided into over fifteen chieftainships under Chitimukulu’s brothers, sons, and nephews. Richards (1939) writes that the political influence of the Chitimukulu covered much of the area marked by four African Great Lakes (Mweru, Bangweulu, Tanganyika, and Nyasa) and extended south into the Lala country in present-day Central Province, Zambia.

Despite colonial rule and later independence, many Bemba political institutions remain similar to their old forms. The Chitimukulu is the Mwine Lubemba (owner of the Bemba kingdom) and paramount chief; UluBemba is divided into semi-autonomous chieftainships under the reign of the Chitimukulu's brothers, sons, and nephews. Nkula and Mwamba are the senior brothers of the Chitimukulu, and are usually heirs to the Chitimukulu throne; Nkole Mfumu and Mpepo are the younger brothers of the Chitimukulu. Nkole Mfumu usually comes to the Mwamba throne, and Mpepo usually comes to the Nkole Mfumu throne. Occasionally, Mpepo and Nkole Mfumu have ascended to the Chitimukulu throne.

Since the establishment of the protectorate in the early 20th century, during the reign of Mutale Chikwanda (1911-1916), the Chitimukulu throne is now more cultural and ceremonial than executive and administrative. However, this has not removed the chief's political importance. Chitimukulu, Chitimukulu Kanyanta-manga II, is the 38th on the Chitimukulu throne. He ascended to the throne in August 2013, and was crowned on 31 July 2015. Chitimukulu Kanyanta-manga II wrote a 2016 article, "The Illusive Role of the Chitimukulu", reflecting on the institution he had assumed and setting out the leadership roles he sought to assume.

== Language ==
A Bemba speaker, recorded in Zambia

The Bemba language (Ichibemba) is most closely related to the Bantu languages Kiswahili (Katanga dialect), Kaonde in Zambia and the DRC, Luba in the DRC, and Nsenga and Chewa in Zambia and Malawi. In Zambia, Bemba is primarily spoken in the Northern, Luapula, Central, and Copperbelt Provinces. It is not an indigenous language in the Copperbelt region.

== Culture ==
Bemba are slash-and-burn agriculturists, with manioc and finger millet their main crops. Many Bemba also raise goats, sheep, and other livestock. Some Bemba are also employed in the mining industry. Traditional Bemba society is matrilineal, and close bonds between women or mother and daughter are considered essential.

Bemba culture is not homogenous. There are two broad groups, one who call Luapula were historically a matrilineal society. Historically, women were referred to as cibinda wa ng’anda and were also landowners. In the past, men joined women’s families after marriage, this has largely changed after colonialism.

Bemba women have a rite of passage into marriage called imbusa. Women's families source teachers, banacimbusa to prepare them for marriage. Imbusa is a months - long process or ritual which is a means of teaching brides secrets of being a good wife. It is constituted of emblems, songs, dances, pottery and a community married women who have been through the process.

== Quotes from studies of AbaBemba ==
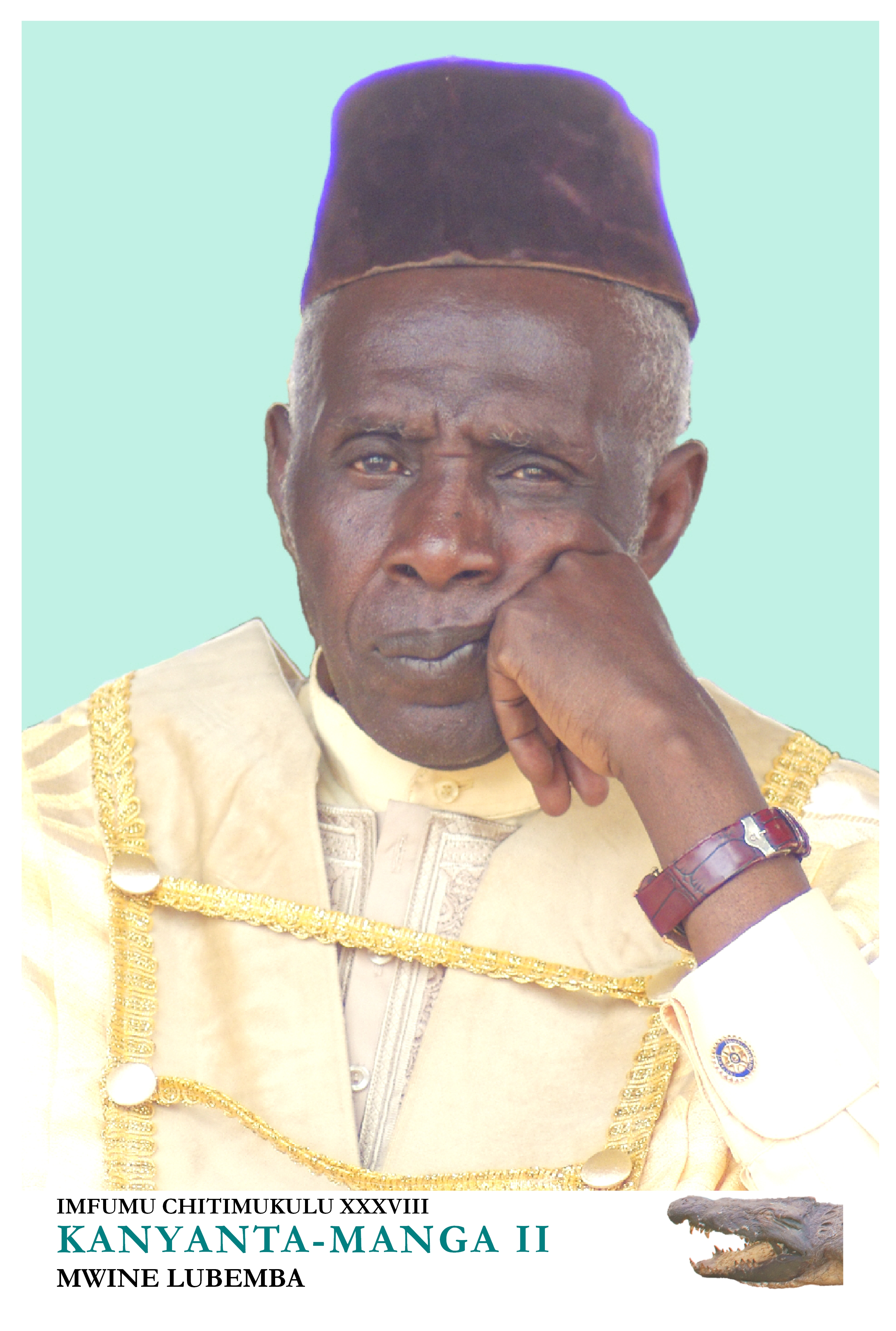
Mwine Lubemba Chitimukulu Kanyanta-manga II, ruler of the Bemba people, who ascended to the throne in 2013

Richards (1939, pp. 29–30) says that the Bemba

... are obsessed with problems of status and constantly on the look-out for their dignity, as is perhaps natural in a society in which so much depends on rank. All their human relations are dominated by rules of respect to age and position… Probably this universal acceptance of the rights of rank makes the Bemba appear so submissive and almost servile to the European… Arrogant towards other tribes, and touchy towards their fellows, they seem to endure in silence any treatment from a chief (sic, should read "monarch") or a European.

To my mind, their most attractive characteristics are quick sympathy and adaptability in human relationships, an elaborate courtesy and sense of etiquette, and great polish of speech. A day spent at the Paramount's (sic, should read "King") court is apt to make a European observer's manners seem crude and boorish by contrast (pp. 139-140).

Mukuka (2013, pp. 139–140), writes that

With the introduction of the English polity in the (Northern Rhodesia) colony, the long-established Bemba civilization and its intrinsic psychological realities were disrupted. For many abaBemba, the arbitrary amalgamation of 70-plus ethnic groups meant 1) a new identity, incomprehensible and groundless; 2) fears of loss of what they had known (politically, socially and economically) about managing their lives; and, 3) new centers of power (political, social, and cultural) that they had to learn to navigate. Insaka and ifibwanse, the long-established centers for educating Bemba boys and girls, respectively, lost their power to Western schools that promised successful learners the social status next to that of the "white" colonisers. Bemba cultural practices and ideals were harshly judged by both colonisers and Christian missionaries. Consequently, abaBemba asked: "who are we" in Northern Rhodesia? What is "our place" in this new amalgam? How do we "fit in"? Taking advantage of the written text, questions of "who we are, where we are" and "how we fit in" found expression in Bemba literature – particularly the over twenty documented Bemba factual novels ...

== Bibliography ==
- Bandinel, J. (1842). Some account of the trade in slaves from Africa as connected with Europe and America: From the introduction of the trade into modern Europe, down to the present time. London: Longman, Brown, & Co.
- Gondola, D. (2002). The History of Congo. The Greenwood Histories of the Modern Nations. London: Greenwood Press.
- Mukuka, R. (2013). Ubuntu in S. M. Kapwepwe’s Shalapo Canicandala: Insights for Afrocentric psychology. Journal of Black Studies, 44(2), 137-157.
- Mushindo, P. M. B. (1977). A Short History of the Bemba (as Narrated by a Bemba). Lusaka: Neczam for the Institute for African Studies. OCLC 5942417.
- Reid, Richard J. (2012). A history of modern Africa: 1800 to the present (2nd ed.). West Sussex: John Wiley & Sons. ISBN 978-0-470-65898-7.
- Richards, A. I. (1939). Land, labour, and diet in Northern Rhodesia: An economic study of the Bemba tribe. London: Oxford University Press.
- Roberts, A. (1970). Chronology of the Bemba (N.E. Zambia). Journal of African History, 11(2), 221-240.
- Roberts, A. D. (1973). A history of the Bemba: Political growth and change in north-eastern Zambia before 1900. London: Longman.
- Tanguy, F. (1948). Imilandu ya Babemba [Bemba history]. London: Oxford University Press. OCLC 504454798.
- African Elders & Labrecque, E. (1949). History of Bena-Ng’oma (Ba Chungu wa Mukulu). London, Macmillan & Co. Ltd.
- Nicholas M. Katanekwa, "The Prehistory of the 73+ Bantu Languages and Language Groups of Zambia 3000 BC - 1600 AD". Lusaka, Katanekwa, 2016.
