= Bungu =

Bungu may refer to:

== Languages ==
- Bungu language, a Bantu language spoken by the Bungu people in Tanzania
- Bongo language, a Nilo-Saharan language spoken in South Sudan

== People ==
- Vuyani Bungu (born 1967), a South African boxer
- Bungu Nkwenkwe, husband of Xhosa prophetess Nontetha Nkwenkwe

== Places ==
- Bungu County, a county of Jubek State in Sudan
- Bungu, a village in Bogoro, Bauchi State, Nigeria
- Bungu, a ward in Korogwe District, Tanzania
- Bungu, a village in Rufiji District, Tanzania
- Bungu Owiny, ruins of the Jo k'Owiny Luo peoples near Lake Kanyaboli, Kenya
- Vungu, a historic kingdom on the Congo River, also spelled Bungu

== Other uses ==
- Bungu people, of Tanzania
- Poso bungu, a species of fish
- Ceratotheca sesamoides or false sesame, known as bungu in Nigeria
- Hagoromo Bungu, a Japanese office supply company

== See also ==
- Bungus (disambiguation)
