= Sange =

Sange may refer to:

- Sange, Democratic Republic of the Congo, a commune in the South Kivu province of the Democratic Republic of the Congo
- Sange, Tanzania, an administrative ward in the Ileje district of the Mbeya Region
- Gary Sange, a contemporary American poet and professor of poetry at Virginia Commonwealth University
- Sange, Bhiwandi, a village in India
- Sange, an item in the computer game 'DOTA 2.'
