= Narwimba =

Narwimba was a Safwa woman who lived in mid-to-late 19th century Tanzania. She was born in a village located on the Songwe River and later moved to northern Malawi. She lived during a time of conquest from the Ngoni people heading into Safwaland, being abducted and transported within the Tanzania-Malawi border region throughout her life. She was interviewed by Elise Kootz-Kreschmer, a German missionary who recorded her life story and published it under the title “Grandmother Narwimba” in 1925. Narwimba has since appeared in numerous scholarly contexts discussing slavery in East Africa.

== Historical context ==
The Ngoni had migrated through the Gaza Kingdom, between the Limpopo River and Save Rivers, reaching the land surrounding Lake Tanganyika, Luangwa River, and Lake Malawi. The Ngoni raided the lands they migrated through, gathering food, cattle and captives. Young men from the lands they raided would join the raiding crews whilst captured women were married off to Ngoni men.

In the region that would later become Tanzania, daughters could be placed in a chief's court to work if her father was unable to feed her, to have his daughter returned he would pay the chief back in goats, should her father not be able to pay for his daughter she remained a slave. Other forms of women's enslavement or servitude were through marriage, she would be sold as a wife without the full rights of a wife whose husband paid her relatives. A woman's status from highest to lowest then could be a wife with full rights, a wife without full rights, and a slave. Arabs along the coast of Tanzania and Zanzibar had crop plantations that used African slave labor.

== Early life ==
Narwimba was the daughter of Sirwimba. Narwimba and her family fled their homeland when Ngoni warriors attacked, moving to Kondeland. Kondeland was within the protection of the Kyungu chiefdom. There she, per agreement with her parents, met and married a man named Sambi. She had six children with him, but only her daughter Tjifuwa survived. Sambi was later killed in an Ngoni raid on Kondeland.

After Sambi died, his nephew Mirambo Muachiete traveled to Kondeland. Muachiete was the son of a chief and Muachiete would inherit Sambi's widow by custom, so Narwimba became married to him and moved to his homeland, a region in Malawi called Chiete. Narwimba and Muachiete's journey to Chiete was prolonged by repeated Ngoni invasions. Muachiete's father died soon after Muachiete and Narwimba arrived, so Muachiete became the new chief of Chiete. Muachiete had multiple wives before Narwimba and took another when he became chief. She had six more children with Muachiete but only two survived: a son, Ngwara, and an unnamed daughter.

== Biography ==
=== Marriage trafficking ===
Within eastern Africa, especially regions with European influence, African men married unwilling women as an unregulated form of enslavement. Forced marriage legally safeguarded purchasers from breaking anti-slave trade laws. Elite men trafficked women by giving them to loyal soldiers or ‘looting’ them from a successful raid, whereas elite women and non-elite free men gave away women to pay fines or even as part of the dowry for a legitimate bride. The presence of many wives showcased a man's wealth and influence. Elite eastern African families perceived enslaved women as submissive and assumed that enslaved women assimilated into new societies more easily than men.

A famine soon overtook the bordering Inamanga region, and many Mwanga refugees fled to Chiete for food. Fearing betrayal, Muachiete executed a Mwanga beggar to set an example. The execution angered the chief of Inamanga who sent warriors to attack Chiete as vengeance. Narwimba and her tenth daughter, alongside other women and children, were kidnapped by a group of Mwanga attackers. Narwimba never saw this daughter again after their captors separated them.

Narwimba's captors beat her and began transporting her to Kiwere to sell into enslavement. Before the trip's completion, Narwimba snuck away and escaped into the mountains in the night. She found refuge in a village where the chieftain's daughter, Samuene, protected her from being executed for escaping enslavement. After some days, she returned to Chiete.

Ngwara moved away from Chiete to a place near Lake Malawi where he hoped to trade with some English, and Muachiete gave away Tjifuwa to an enslaved man as a gift. Further marriage raids and trafficking continued throughout Narwimba, Tjifuwa, and Tjifuwa's daughter's lives. Though they kept contact with each other, each enslaved marriage attempted to make them ‘kinless.’ Slave raiders considered ‘kinless’ women the most assimilable and profitable for elite slave purchasers.

=== Disappearance and death ===
Narwimba converted to Christianity during the latter years of her life. Some years after her interview with Kootz, she disappeared from Utengule where she lived with her daughter and granddaughter. She told Kootz that she was going to look for her son in her homeland. From here, Narwimba disappears from the historical record and is assumed to have died at a later date.

== Legacy ==
=== Scholarly impact ===
Historian Marcia Wright published an English translation of “Grandmother Narwimba” in her essay “Women in Peril,” and discussed Narwimba further in later publications. Wright examined Narwimba as a case study to draw further conclusions about the social status and changing conditions of women more broadly.

Narwimba's testimony has become a crucial reference point for historians and other scholars of east African slavery and historical gender studies. “Grandmother Narwimba” has been translated in multiple languages, reprinted in several scholarly books, and cited in over 200 academic essays.
