= Mwashinga =

Mwashinga may refer to:

- The Safwa people of Mbeya, Tanzania whose chief was called Mwashinga

== People ==
Mwashinga is a surname. Notable people with the surname include:

- Christopher Mwashinga (born 1965), Tanzanian Adventist author, poet
