= MSIA =

MSIA can refer to

- Master of Science in Industrial Administration, a graduate degree formerly offered by GSIA (now known as Tepper School of Business)
- Master of Science in Information Assurance, a graduate degree
- Mass Spectrometric Immunoassay, protein analysis
- MSIA - Member of the Society of Industrial Artists
- Movement of Spiritual Inner Awareness, an American new religious movement, sometimes pronounced as acronym—"messiah".
- Msia (ward), an administrative ward in the Mbozi District of Tanzania
