= Kafule =

Coordinates: 9.545°S 33.513°E

Kafule is an administrative ward in Ileje District, Songwe Region, Tanzania. According to the 2002 census, the ward has a total population of 6,892.
