= Myovizi =

Coordinates: 8.9884°S 33.0493°E

Myovizi is an administrative ward in Mbozi District, Songwe Region, Tanzania. According to the 2002 census, the ward has a total population of 13,491.
