= Nakonde Airport =

Nakonde Airport is an airport being developed by the Zambia National Service in Nakonde District, Muchinga Province, Zambia. It will serve the border town of Nakonde and nearby towns. Construction of the airport is estimated to take 36 months (starting from February 2025) and will cost K2.8 billion. It will be a greenfield airport and will have a 2.5 km runway.
