= Nkangamo =

Coordinates: 9.2047°S 32.6034°E

Nkangamo is an administrative ward in Momba District, Songwe Region, Tanzania. As of the 2022 census, it has a total population of 16,804. According to the 2002 census, the ward was in the Mbozi District and had a total population of 8,122. A 400 kV transmission line is in the planning phase and would terminate within Tanzania around Nkangamo.
