= Kyungu (disambiguation) =

Kyungu is a traditional authority in Karonga District of Malawi.

Kyungu may also refer to:

- Gédéon Kyungu, Congolese warlord and Mai-Mai Kata Katanga leader 2011–2016
- Gabriel Kyungu wa Kumwanza (1938–2021), Congolese politician

== See also ==
- Gyeongui Line, a railway line in South Korea
