= Ngulugulu =

Coordinates: 9.434°S 33.561°E

Ngulugulu is an administrative ward in Ileje District, Songwe Region, Tanzania. According to the 2002 census, the ward has a total population of 5,346.
