= Igamba =

Coordinates: 8.9654°S 32.9353°E

Igamba is an administrative ward in Mbozi District, Songwe Region, Tanzania. According to the 2002 census, the ward has a total population of 29,596.
