= Namkukwe =

Coordinates: 8.571°S 32.718°E

Namkukwe is an administrative ward in Songwe District, Songwe Region, Tanzania. According to the 2002 census, the ward has a total population of 8,450.
