= Itaka =

Itaka may refer to:

- Itaka, Tanzania, an administrative ward in the Mbozi District of the Mbeya Region of Tanzania
- Itaka, Russia, an urban-type settlement in Zabaykalsky Krai, Russia
- Itaka Arena, football stadium in Poland built in 2024
