= Galula =

Administrative ward in Tansania

Coordinates: 8.646°S 33.005°E

Galula is an administrative ward in Songwe District, Songwe Region, Tanzania. According to the 2002 census, the ward has a total population of 14,005.

Under German occupation, it was known as St. Moritz (German: Sankt-Moritz).
