= Totowe =

Coordinates: 8.529°S 32.852°E

Totowe is an administrative ward in Songwe District, Songwe Region, Tanzania. According to the 2002 census, the ward has a total population of 8,654.
