= Itumba =

Coordinates: 9.4715°S 33.195°E

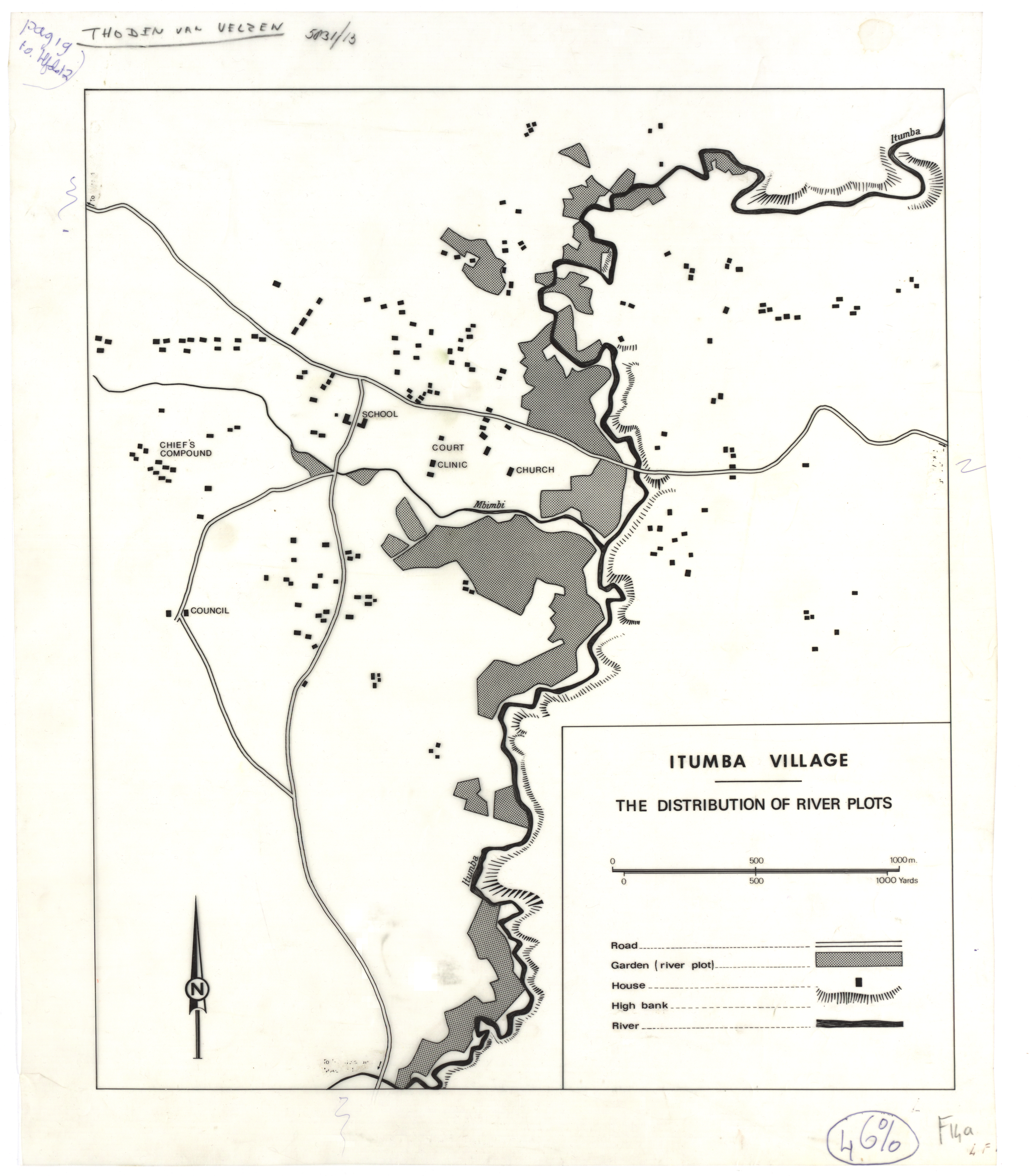
Itumba village (c.1970). Collection ASC Leiden

Itumba is an administrative ward in Ileje District, Songwe Region, Tanzania. According to the 2002 census, the ward has a total population of 12,668. It is home to the Ndali people, who occupy that region of Tanzania and parts of Malawi.
