= Ibaba =

Coordinates: 9°24′S 33°21′E

Ibaba is an administrative ward in Ileje District, Songwe Region, Tanzania. In the 2002 census, the ward had a total population of 6,805. Ibaba is composed of five village which are Lali, Sheyo, Shikunga, Shuba and Ibaba itself.
