= Bungus =

Bungus may refer to:

- Bungu people, of Tanzania
- Bungus Bay, south of Padang in West Sumatra
- Pietro Bongo (died 1601), Latinized as Petrus Bungus, an Italian writer

== See also ==
- Bungu (disambiguation)
