= Chiwezi =

Administrative ward in Tanzania

Coordinates: 9.1916°S 32.7266°E

Chiwezi is an administrative ward in Mbozi District, Songwe Region, Tanzania. According to the 2002 census, the ward has a total population of 12,657.
