= Mwanga language =

Bantu language spoken in Zambia and Tanzania

Namwanga
- Ichinamwanga
- Native to: Zambia, Tanzania
- Ethnicity: Mwanga people
- Native speakers: (230,000 cited 1987– 2010 census)
- Language family: Niger–Congo?: Atlantic–Congo; Benue–Congo; Bantoid; Bantu; Rukwa; Mbozi; Mwika; Namwanga
- Dialects: Iwa; Tambo

Language codes
- ISO 639-3: mwn
- Glottolog: nyam1275
- Guthrie code: M.22,26,27

Mwanga, or Namwanga (Nyamwanga), is a Bantu language spoken by the Mwanga people in the Muchinga Province of Zambia (mainly in the districts of Isoka and Nakonde) and in Mbeya Region, Tanzania. The 2010 Zambian census found 140,000 speakers. The current number in Tanzania is unknown; Ethnologue cites a figure from 1987 of 87,000.

There are also some speakers of Namwanga in the north-west part of Chitipa District in northern Malawi.

The Namwanga language is similar to the Mambwe language spoken by the Mambwe people of Mbala and Mpulungu districts and the Lungu people also found in Isoka. Other similar smaller peoples include the Lambyas, the Nyikas and the Wandyas.

== Alphabet ==
Nyamwanga has 5 vowels and 17 consonants, a total of 22 letters

Vowels: A E I O U

Consonants: B D F G H J K L M N P S SH T V W Y Z

== Sample text ==
- Amulandu ci wuno Yesu atalesizye umuntu wino wafumyanga iviwa mwi zina lyakwe nanti aca kuti atalinji pa wasambilizi wakwe?
- Why did Jesus not prevent a man from expelling demons, even though the man was not following him?
- Mwalinda tata?
- Good afternoon Father.

== Namwanga names ==
Among the Namwanga, the personal name is typically bestowed upon a child either before or after the detachment of the umbilical cord. Unlike some neighboring cultures, the Namwanga do not use temporary birth names; instead, real and permanent names are given at birth. These names are selected by elderly family members to reflect Namwanga traditions and culture.

=== Surnames ===
Namwanga surnames often follow specific linguistic patterns to denote gender and family identity. While many first names are gender-neutral, surnames are frequently morphologically marked to indicate sex using specific prefixes:

- Si-: A prefix added to the root name to denote a male (e.g., Si-mukonda).
- Na-: A prefix added to the root name to denote a female (e.g., Na-mukonda).

Some Namwanga surnames do not follow this prefix rule but are inherently understood within the community as referring to the same family.

Male Surname	Female Surname
Siame	Nakamba
Sichone	Namonje
Sikombe	Nakaponda
Silwizya	Nakalumbi
Sikalangwe	Nachona

=== First names ===
Namwanga first names are grouped into various socio-semantic themes based on the experiences of the name-giver. These themes include clan names, names expressing the ability to fight, names that reflect character, Names that reflect gossiping, names expressing complaint, names expressing ownership, names expressing care, names expressing unity, names expressing hatred and special names.

First name	Gender	Socio-semantic theme	Meaning
Alinani	Male		He is with Me
Alinaswe	Female		He is with Us
Alinjavwa			He wIll Help
Alinjita			He will call me
Alinjvwa			He wIll Hear me
Chamunda		Sichilongo Clan Name	
Changala			
Chikulamayembe			Carrier of Hoes
Chilolwa		Sichilongo Clan Name	
Chilumba			
Chiluwa			
Chimwemwe			
Chinvya			Victory
Chinyanyali		Names Expressing Complaint	Dirt
Chipando			
Chipansya			
Chipwelile			Lazyness
Chiwanza			
Chiwutwe		Names Expressing Ownership	Owner
Chizengo		Names Expressing Unity	Build or Unite
Chuswa			
Chuusa		Sichilongo Clan Name	
Imbanji			Suffering
Izukanji			Memory
Kachinga	Male		Protector
Kafwatula		Sichilongo Clan Name	
Kafwimbi		Names Expressing the Ability to Fight	Conqueror
Kamyalile			
Kangafwe			
Kapewa		Simwawa Clan Name	
Kasempa		Simwawa Clan Name	
Katwamakondo		Simwawa Clan Name	
Kongonsyanji			
Kundananji			Love One Another
Kusechela			Rejoycing
Kuzipa			Beautiful
Landanji		Names that Reflect Gossiping	Keep on Talking
Lavya			Saviour
Lenganji			Asking God
Leukanji			Reflect
Lolelanji			Something to look up too
Lukundo			Love
Lumbulanji			Calm Down
Lumvya			
Luswepo			Light
Luwala			
Luwito			
Maimbo		Names Expressing Complaint	Problems
Manda			Days
Matula		Names that Reflect Character	Destroyer
Matumbe			
Mbepa		Names that Reflect Gossiping	Lie
Melezyo			Temptations
Mengwa		Names Expressing Unity	Peace
Mpazi			Spirit
Mpoli			
Mtinde			
Muchindikeni			
Muchinga		Sichilongo Clan Name	
Muchinzi		Names Expressing Care	Respect
Mukatakulima			
Mukombe			
Mukomanji			Kill
Mukundwe			
Mukalakata		Simwawa Clan Name	
Mulotwa			
Mulwanda			
Musanya			
Musekanji		Names Expressing Complaint	Keep on Laughing at Him or Her
Musenga		Special Names	Born After a Dead Brother
Musiyani			Leave him
Mutukanji		Names Expressing Complaint	Keep on Laughing at Him or Her
Mukukwanji			
Muvwambe			
Muvwanjilanji			
Muwemba			
Mwaka			
Mwezi			
Mwiche			
Mwinji		Siame Clan Name	Abundance
Mwivwilanji			
Mwiza			
Mwizukanji			
Myalalanji			
Namonje			Queen
Namposya			
Namwinga			
Nataizya			Thank You
Nasalifya			Thank You
Nchindika			
Ndanji			Welcome
Ndinawe			I am with You
Ndipo			
Ndolanji		Names Expressing Care	Keep on Seeing Me
Ndosilwe			Blessing
Ngao		Siame Clan Name	
Niza			I Have Come
Njavwa			Help
Nkambaku			The Alpha Male Bull
Nkumbu			Grace
Nkusechela			
Nkusuwila	Unisex		Trust in God
Nkuwanga			
Ntakasi			
Ntamanyile			
Ntamuwosya			
Ntapalila			
Ntapechela			
Ntasuwile			
Ntawandulwa			
Ntiwilila			I Will Not Froget
Nzala			Hunger
Pawi		Special Names	Born when there was a Funeral for a Family Member
Pepanji			Keep on Praying
Pupuzyanji			
Salifyanji		Names Expressing Care	Keep on Thanking
Sankananji			Hapiness
Sechelanji			
Sekanji			
Simawe			
Sungananji			Keep Each Other
Sunganji			
Suwilanji	Unisex		Faith
Suwilo			
Swensi			
Tamikanji			Trouble
Tasula			
Temwananji			
Temwani			
Tengawezi			Bring Together
Tepwanji			Be Calm
Tepechela		Names that Reflect Character	Careless
Tetelanji	Unisex		Forgive
Tukuya			
Tupilwa			
Tusankine			
Twapelwa			
Twiza			We Have Come
Ulanda			
Vilezu			
Vwambanji			
Vwanganji		Names that Reflect Gossiping	Keep on Talking
Wachinvwa			
Walukundo			God is Love
Waimbila		Names Expressing Complaint	Suffering
Wanjavwa			You Have Helped Me
Wanjavwa			You Have Heard Me
Wankumbu			Mercy
Wankunda			You Love Me
Wantula			
Wapetwa		Names that Express Hatred	You are Hated
Wampa			God has Given Me
Wamusula			Disrespect
Wamusuwila			Trust
Wantota			Tired
Watupa	Unisex		
Wayimanyila			
Winganji		Names that Express Hatred	Keep on Chasing Him or Her
Wiza	Unisex		He or She has Come
Wuzyanji			
Yimbanji			
Yivwananji		Names Expressing Unity	Keep on Understanding Each Other
Yowani			
Zanji			Come
Zevyanji			
Zewelanji			Rejoyce
Ziukanji			
Zonto		Names that Reflect Gossiping	Talking anyhow

== Favourite foods ==
- Beans and Okra commonly known as Kumbi
- Cassava
- Millet

== See also ==
- Languages of Zambia
