= Mbuyuni =

Coordinates: 8.524°S 33.003°E

Mbuyuni is an administrative ward in Songwe District, Songwe Region, Tanzania. According to the 2002 census, the ward has a total population of 14,797.
