= Mlowo =

Coordinates: 9°00′S 32°59′E

Mlowo is an administrative ward in Mbozi District, Songwe Region, Tanzania. According to the 2002 census, the ward has a total population of 17,663.
