= Isansa =

Local government in Tanzania

Coordinates: 8.8192°S 32.9779°E

Isansa is an administrative ward in Mbozi District, Songwe Region, Tanzania. According to the 2002 census, the ward has a total population of 35,519.
