= Mkwajuni =

Administrative ward in Songwe Region, Tanzania

Coordinates: 8.4238°S 33.0290°E

Mkwajuni is an administrative ward in Songwe District, Songwe Region, Tanzania. According to the 2002 census, the ward has a total population of 22,101.
