= WBH =

WBH may refer to:

- West German Audio Book Library for the Blind
- Williamstown Beach railway station, Victoria, Australia
- Wells Bring Hope - see List of water-related charities
- A model of the Chevrolet Avalanche car
- West Bird's Head languages of New Guinea
- Wanda language of Tanzania (ISO 639-3 code: wbh)
