= Nyimbili =

Coordinates: 9.2349°S 33.0491°E

Nyimbili is an administrative ward in Mbozi District, Songwe Region, Tanzania. According to the 2002 census, the ward has a total population of 21,302.
