= Ruanda (Mbozi) =

Coordinates: 8.9827°S 33.1128°E

Ruanda is an administrative ward in Mbozi District, Songwe Region, Tanzania. According to the 2002 census, the ward has a total population of 15,614.
