= Malangali =

Malangali may refer to:

- Malangali, Mufindi, an administrative ward in Mufindi District, Iringa Region, Tanzania
- Malangali, Sumbawanga, a ward (borough) in the city of Sumbawanga, Tanzania
- Malangali, Ileje, an administrative ward in Ileje District, Songwe Region, Tanzania
- Malangali, an administrative ward of Wanging'ombe District, Njombe Region, Tanzania
