= Mbebe =

Coordinates: 9.325°S 32.962°E

Mbebe is an administrative ward in Ileje District, Songwe Region, Tanzania. According to the 2002 census, the ward has a total population of 6,899.
