= Nambinzo =

Coordinates: 8.7273°S 32.6320°E

Nambinzo is an administrative ward in Mbozi District, Songwe Region, Tanzania. In the 2022 census, it had a total population of 29,757, up from 18,769 in 2002.
