= Halungu =

Coordinates: 8.9378°S 32.8132°E

Halungu is an administrative ward in Mbozi District, Songwe Region, Tanzania. According to the 2002 census, the ward has a total population of 22,769.
