= Chilulumo =

Administrative ward in Songwe Region, Tanzania

Coordinates: 8.6645°S 32.3733°E

Chilulumo is an administrative ward in Momba District, Songwe Region, Tanzania. It was part of the Mbozi District, before 2016. As of the 2022 census, the population is 15,636. According to 2002 census results, the ward had a total population of 13,388.
