= Itale =

Itale may refer to:

- Italé, a neighbourhood in Nigeria
- Itale (Aeolis), a town of ancient Aeolis, now in Turkey
- Itale, Tanzania, a subdistrict in Ileje District, Tanzania
