= Bupigu =

Coordinates: 9.464°S 33.337°E

Bupigu is an administrative ward in Ileje District, Songwe Region, Tanzania. According to the 2002 census, the ward has a total population of 6,190.
