= Mbozi District =

Coordinates: 08°45′S 32°45′E

Mbozi
- District
- location in Songwe Region
- Country: Tanzania
- Region: Songwe Region

Area
  - Total: 3,404 km^{2} (1,314 sq mi)

Population (2022)
  - Total: 510,599
  - Density: 150.0/km^{2} (388.5/sq mi)

Mbozi District is a district in Songwe Region, Tanzania. It is bordered to the north by the Songwe District and Chunya District of the Mbeya Region, to the east by Mbeya Rural District of the Mbeya Region, to the south by the Ileje District and to the west by Momba District.

According to the 2002 Tanzania National Census, the population of Mbozi District was 515,270. The district had an area of 967,900 hectares (2,391,733 acres). The district was restructured in 2016.

The District Commissioner of Mbozi District is D.I. Rwegasira.

== Administrative subdivisions ==
As of 2016, Mbozi District is administratively divided into twenty-nine wards. The wards are:

- Bara
- Halungu
- Hasamba
- Hasanga
- Hezya
- Ichenjezya
- Idiwili
- Igamba
- Ihanda
- Ilolo
- Ipunga
- Isalalo
- Isansa
- Itaka
- Itumpi
- Iyula
- Kilimampimbi
- Magamba
- Mahenje
- Mlangali
- Mlowo
- Msia
- Nambinzo
- Nanyala
- Nyimbili
- Ruanda
- Shiwinga
- Ukwile
- Vwawa

Mbozi District was administratively divided into six divisions, twenty-five wards (no longer including Tunduma, which now has its own town council) and 175 villages. The wards were:

- Chilulumo
- Chitete
- Chiwezi
- Halungu
- Igamba
- Ihanda
- Isandula
- Isansa
- Itaka
- Ivuna
- Iyula
- Kamsamba
- Kapele
- Mlangali
- Mlowo
- Msangano
- Msia
- Myovizi
- Myunga
- Nambinzo
- Ndalambo
- Nkangamo
- Nyimbili
- Ruanda (Mbozi)
- Vwawa
