= Ngwala =

Coordinates: 7.475°S 32.779°E

Ngwala is an administrative ward in Songwe District, Songwe Region, Tanzania. According to the 2002 census, the ward had a total population of 2,595.
