= Safwa people =

Ethnic group from Mbeya Region of Tanzania

The Safwa are an ethnic and linguistic group based in the mountains of the Mbeya Region, Tanzania. The Safwa people were moved to Mbeya Tanzania from Zambia. The Safwa language is a member of the large Niger–Congo language family group. Alternate names for Safwa are Ishisafwa, Cisafwa, and Kisafwa. Its dialects are Guruka, Mbwila, Poroto, and Songwe. ISO 639-3 language code is sbk.

In 1957 the Safwa population was estimated to be approximately 158,000. In 2012 after the national census, the tribe's population estimates is expected to exceed 450,000. The Wasafwa population had increased from 9,000 in 1910, during the German occupation.

== Organisation ==
The Safwa were a very loosely organized people, hardly more than subjects of the Wasangu, by whom they had been conquered in 1893. They apparently had no traditional history and came close to being stateless. Even though they can be considered stateless they were still split into many small chiefdoms, much as the Nyika and Wanda with whom they seem to have been related. They were easily defeated (being accused of never getting their act together), but difficult to control. They hated being under the dominion of Merere's Wasangu, and were later a difficult to administer, wanting nothing to interfere with their feeling of equality, which was central to their identity and ideology.

As the Wasangu spread terror, the stateless Wasafwa retreated and scattered into the hills, leaving empty land. It was not only the Wasangu domination they hated, in hope of expelling all Europeans, they killed off all male animals on the supposed order of a reincarnated ancestor-hero. In the 1890s Safwa children played at assaulting fortresses. Perhaps the same fortress forced on them by the Sangu or when they were surprised by the sudden arrival of Safari Conductor Bauer and his people.

== Culture ==
=== Childbirth ===
As the occupation by the Wasangu continued, the traditions and customs of the Safwa slowly disappeared. Some, however remained, such as allowing new born children to die of hunger with the death of their mother, as no woman was allowed to breast feed a child not her own. There were no wet nurses.

Giving birth to twins was a severe shock to parents who then normally allowed one to die of hunger, thus avoiding the fear of the possible death of the parents due to two angry spirits. Following a twin birth, the process of cleansing the village and parents with a 'medicine doctor' was complex and took a great deal of wealth in livestock and agricultural products. It could take two years (ten years if both twins lived), until they were finally treated as regular members of the community. Otherwise the Wasafwa denied ever killing children handicapped at birth, "It is God's - Nguluvi's - will" and it is said they were treated as normal children.

It is also said that Albino children are not put to death, although Albinos are not seen among the Wasafwas, but many are seen in other parts of Central Africa.

Two to three days following birth the child begins to be force-fed by being laid on its back with millet mush placed in its mouth. The nose is pinched shut and when the mouth is opened to breathe the mush is eaten. The fingers of the mother continue to push the pap beyond nutritional needs. It is thought to prepare the child for a later life of feast or famine.

=== Chief ===
The official title of the Safwa's chief is "Mwene". The most powerful clan to hold the mweneship for many years is the Mwashinga clan. The Mwashingas have their origins at Igawilo, in Mbeya Urban district. One of the modern Mwenes, who was perhaps, the most powerful and influential, is Mwene Paul Mwashinga (not to be confused with Paul William Mwashinga from Mwanjelwa who died in 2015). This man was educated, rich and well traveled. Before his death in 1987 he had commanded a lot of respect not only from his own people, but also from high ranking government officials. This was especially evidenced by the number of important political and business people who attended his funeral at Igawilo Mbeya in 1987. He was buried near Iganjo less than a kilometer away from Igawilo High School. On the death of an old leader, choosing a new chief could be complex: the elder counselors were called and the dying chief told them who was to be the new leader, normally one of his sons or grandsons, no one else was told of the choice, not even the son or other family members, or even other members of the village. No one knew. Only when people were told "the chief is not well, do not make any noise", were they aware he was dying. With his death the 'old' counselors buried the body as everyone slept. Only the next day when they were told, "he is very ill, no one may walk on another chief's land", did they know he had died. There were no lamentations, but all men, women, and children shaved their heads. The women quickly brewed beer. Those of the sons who had decided not to accept the role of chief disappeared ahead of time. The old counselors then 'decided' who would be the new chief and 'boxed' the ears of the resistant one until he accepted. The leaders also took two more youths, one to become the Migave and the other a girl, the Namutemi (the 'also crowned', even if the new chief had many other wives). The Namutemi remained a full month, and only after a month were people able to celebrate the 'bringing out' or the new chief.

Some chiefs avoided eating the meat of dogs, (which only caused the stomach to bark), lions, elephants, and rhinoceros (for they are rulers of the wild), hippopotamus (for they give spots on the skin). Some could not even eat corn and beans cooked together or the leaves of vegetables, for this would brand them as poor. Since "rain is afraid to fall on barren peaks or forest land", chiefs could not shave their heads; they could only cut it, for they were after all responsible for good rain. Since much of Safwaland could be very cold. Weaving by the men was a normal occupation, but by 1909 a man could earn four times more cloth through wages than weaving it himself, for with the importation of European cloth the weaving industry began to die out.

=== Religion ===
Originally the Safwas, like many inland Tanzanian tribes, were traditionalists. They worshiped ancestors. They used to keep a sacred grove where the elders (priests) of the tribe would visit in times of disasters such as lack of rain or outbreak of killer diseases. During such visits, the rest of the people would refrain from manual labor such as tilling the land while waiting in anticipation for the outcome of the elders' visit to the sacred grove. The elders visited the grove in order to give gifts to the ancestors to appease them and pray for rain or removal of diseases from the land. On many occasions, at least in case of rain, the rain would pour down even before the elders reached their residences. A good example of such sacred groves can presently be seen at Iganjo in Igawilo, approximately 15 kilometers from Mbeya city center.

However, in recent decades, there has been a significant change in the spirituality of the Safwas. Most of them have accepted other faiths such as Christianity and even Islam. About 22% of the Safwas adhere to different Christian denominations. This is a very radical shift for a tribe that is proud of their culture and are basically conservatives. Some of the Christian denominations that have made significant inroads in this community, and therefore have big impacts in changing the worldview of the people, include: the Assemblies of God, Roman Catholics, Seventh-day Adventists, Jehovah's Witnesses, Moravians, etc. Perhaps this diversity of denominations found in Safwaland speaks more eloquently than any other factor when it comes to how open to new ways of spirituality this group of people has become. All these denominations have trained Safwa ministers some of whom take care of their own people and others serve the larger Christian community elsewhere in the country and beyond. Today in most villages, houses of worship of different shapes and sizes may be found. This would have been impossible just a few decades ago. The Safwa people are becoming more open to the gospel of Jesus Christ. However, a large number of them remain traditionalists, especially the older generation and the not-so old folks.

=== Fence ===
Close to the fence against enemies and wild animals, all villages had a shelter or lodge for the mature men of the village to sit together, and for travelers and older youths to eat and sleep. Its maintenance was considered an obligation of the community.

== Population concentration ==
Before the coming and domination of the Safwas had never before lived in concentrated settlements and hated them. (Not even during the early 1850s, under the Ngoni reign of terror, did they live in crowded settlements). It probably strengthened the Sangu, but increased the danger of famine for the Safwa and reduced their agricultural possibility. Since the Germans returned the Wasangu to the territory of the Wahehe, the population of the Safwa, finally free of the Wasangu, has gone from 9,000 in 1910, 15,000 in the 1920s, and 63,000 in 1957. Just as the Nyika, the Wasafwa were avid communal hunters but only after being inoculated against witchcraft. It was only after being inoculated that hunting songs and dances are performed by the people, who then waited eagerly in anticipation of the meat to be distributed on the successful return of the hunters.

== Notable Safwans ==
Poets and Writers

- Christopher Mwashinga, author
- Castro D.Shazeha
- Narwimba
- Imani Mwilizi
