= Ihanda =

Administrative ward in Songwe Region, Tanzania

Coordinates: 9.1665°S 32.8666°E

Ihanda is an administrative ward in Mbozi District, Songwe Region, Tanzania. According to the 2002 census, the ward has a total population of 25,333.
