= Ikinga =

Administrative ward in Ileje District, Tanzania

Coordinates: 9°30′S 33°33′E

Ikinga is an administrative ward in Ileje District, Songwe Region, Tanzania. According to the 2002 census, the ward had a total population of 7,114.
