= Cornelius Mwalwanda =

Malawian politician and economist (1944–2020)

Cornelius Thomson Mwalwanda
- Born: August 28, 1944; Mwangesia, T/A Kyungu, Karonga District
- Died: July 16, 2020 (aged 75)
- Occupations: Politician, economist, member Malawi Congress Party
- Years active: 2009 – 2020
- Known for: D.M. Finance and Development Planning, work with UNECA

Cornelius T. Mwalwanda (28 August 1944 – 16 July 2020) was a Malawian development economist. He once served as Deputy Minister of Ministry of Finance and Development Planning in the Cabinet of Malawi under Minister Ken Lipenga. Prior to this he has worked for the United Nations Economic Commission for Africa (UNECA).

== Education ==
Mwalwanda was a graduate of the University of Malawi. He received a Bachelor of Social Science Degree. He did his master's degree in economics at the University of New Brunswick and a PhD at the University of Toronto in Canada. He has also previously worked for the United Nations Economic Commission for Africa.

== Early career ==
He has worked as the United Nations Economic Commission for Africa (UNECA) head of the ECA Geneva Liaison Office and as team leader in the UNECA Economic and Social Policy Division. He has also worked as officer-in-charge of the Economic and Social Policy Division (ESPD). He served as chief of the monetary and financial relations section in the former trade and development finance division and officer-in-charge of that division.

== Political career ==
He was the former deputy minister of Ministry of Finance and Development Planning in the Cabinet of Malawi under Minister Ken Lipenga. He was director of Economic Affairs Directorate in the current Malawi Government led by the Malawi Congress Party.

== Death ==
He died on 16 July 2020 at the Kamuzu Central Hospital after contracting COVID-19 during the COVID-19 pandemic in Malawi.
