= Itale, Tanzania =

Coordinates: 9.265°S 33.316°E

Itale is an administrative ward in Ileje District, Songwe Region, Tanzania. According to the 2012 census, the ward has a total population of 7,609, up from 6,720 in 2002.
