= Myunga =

Coordinates: 8.8600°S 32.3021°E

Myunga is an administrative ward in Mbozi District, Songwe Region, Tanzania. According to the 2002 census, the ward has a total population of 16,612.
