= Penja language =

Language

Penja
- Native to: Tanzania
- Native speakers: (possibly extinct) (2009)
- Language family: Niger–Congo?: Atlantic–Congo; Benue–Congo; Southern Bantoid; Bantu; Rukwa; Rungwe; Penja

Language codes
- ISO 639-3: –
- Glottolog: None
- Guthrie code: M.302

Penja is a possibly extinct Bantu language of southern Tanzania, near the north end of Lake Malawi.
