= Wanda language =

Language

Wanda
- Iciwanda
- Native to: Tanzania
- Ethnicity: Wanda, Sichela
- Native speakers: (24,000 cited 1987)
- Language family: Niger–Congo?: Atlantic–Congo; Benue–Congo; Bantoid; Bantu; Rukwa; Mbozi; Mwika; South; Wanda

Language codes
- ISO 639-3: wbh
- Glottolog: wand1264
- Guthrie code: M.21
- ELP: Wanda
- Sichela

Wanda (also, known as Ichiwanda, Iciwanda, Kiwanda, Vanda, Wandia) is a Bantu language of Tanzania. It is considered a vulnerable language with less than 43,000 native speakers worldwide. At least half of Wanda people speak limited Swahili, one of the official languages of Tanzania. Speakers are particularly concentrated in Kamsamba ward in Momba District Council and Kipeta ward in Sumbawanga District.
