= Malila language =

Bantu language of Tanzania

Malila
- Ishimalilia
- Native to: Tanzania
- Native speakers: 65,000 (2003)
- Language family: Niger–Congo?: Atlantic–Congo; Benue–Congo; Bantoid; Bantu; Rukwa; Mbozi; Mbeya; South; Malila

Language codes
- ISO 639-3: mgq
- Glottolog: mali1279
- Guthrie code: M.24

Malila is a Bantu language of Tanzania.
