= Rukwa languages =

Group of Bantu languages

Rukwa
- Corridor–Nyakyusa
- Geographic distribution: E Zambia, SE DR-Congo
- Linguistic classification: Niger–Congo?: Atlantic–Congo; Benue–Congo; Southern Bantoid; Bantu (Zone M.10–30); Rukwa

Language codes
- Glottolog: corr1234

The Rukwa languages are a group of Bantu languages established by Nurse (1988) and Fourshey (2002). They constitute half of Guthrie's Zone M, plus Bungu.

== Languages ==
The languages, or clusters, along with their Guthrie identifications, are:

- Rungwe (M30): Nyakyusa–Ngonde (Konde), Ndali
- Mbozi
  - Mbeya
    - Bungu (Wungu, F20)
    - Safwa (M20)
    - South Mbeya (M20): Malila; Lambya–Sukwa, Nyiha
  - Mwika
    - Nyika (M20)
    - North Mwika (M10): Pimbwe, Rungwa
    - Plateau Mwika:
      - Fipa (M10)
      - South: Wanda, Namwanga–Iwa–Tambo (M20), Mambwe-Lungu (M10)

Nurse (1988) had established a more limited Mbozi ("Corridor"), without Pimbwe or Bungu, and with the addition of Rungwe tentative. Maho (2009) adds Penja (possibly extinct), to M30, and Kulwe as closest to Fipa.
