= Msia (ward) =

Coordinates: 9.0228°S 32.7829°E

Msia is an administrative ward in Mbozi District, Songwe Region, Tanzania. According to the 2002 census, the ward has a total population of 25,098.
