= Ipunga =

Ward in Mbozi, Songwe, Tanzania

Ipunga Kata ya Ipunga
- Ward
- Location within Tanzania
- Coordinates: 9.1109929°S 32.7718472°E
- Country: Tanzania
- Region: Songwe Region
- District: Mbozi District
- Ward: Ipunga

Population (2016)
  - Total: 10,657
- Time zone: UTC+3 (EAT)

Ipunga is a ward in the Mbozi District of Songwe Region, Tanzania. Its postal code is 53316. In 2016 the Tanzania National Bureau of Statistics report there were 10,657 people in the ward, from 9,367 in 2012.
