= Itaka, Tanzania =

Coordinates: 8.8712°S 32.7772°E

Itaka is an administrative ward in Mbozi District, Songwe Region, Tanzania.

== Population ==
According to the 2002 census, the ward has a total population of 33,310.

== Religion ==
The Catholic Church of St. Thomas More is twinned with St. Augustine's Church in Leeds, UK.
