= Bungu language =

Bantu language of Tanzania

Bungu
- Native to: Tanzania
- Ethnicity: Bungu people
- Native speakers: 30,000 (2009)
- Language family: Niger–Congo?: Atlantic–Congo; Benue–Congo; Bantoid; Bantu; Rukwa; Mbozi; Mbeya; Bungu

Language codes
- ISO 639-3: wun
- Glottolog: bung1265
- Guthrie code: F.25

Bungu (Kibungu, Wungu) is a Bantu language of Tanzania.
