= Rungwa language =

Bantu language spoken in Tanzania

Rungwa
- Icilungwa
- Native to: Tanzania
- Native speakers: (18,000 cited 1987)
- Language family: Niger–Congo?: Atlantic–Congo; Benue–Congo; Bantoid; Bantu; Rukwa; Mbozi; Mwika; North; Rungwa

Language codes
- ISO 639-3: rnw
- Glottolog: rung1255
- Guthrie code: M.12

Rungwa is a Bantu language of the Rukwa Region of western Tanzania.
