= Chitete =

Administrative ward in Tanzania

Coordinates: 9.4037°S 33.0677°E

Chitete is the administrative ward in Ileje District, Songwe Region, Tanzania. According to the 2012 census, the ward has a total population of 8,673.
