= Iyula =

Coordinates: 9.0667°S 33.1385°E

Iyula is an administrative ward in Mbozi District, Songwe Region, Tanzania. According to the 2002 census, the ward has a total population of 24,556.
