= Ileje District =

Coordinates: 09°25′S 33°20′E

Ileje
- District
- location in Songwe Region
- Country: Tanzania
- Region: Songwe Region

Area
  - Total: 1,880 km^{2} (730 sq mi)

Population (2022)
  - Total: 125,869
  - Density: 67.0/km^{2} (173/sq mi)

Ileje District is a district in Songwe Region, Tanzania. It is bordered to the north by Mbeya Urban and Rungwe districts, to the east by Kyela District, to the northwest by Mbozi District and to the south by Zambia and Malawi.

As of 2022, the population of Ileje District was 125,869.

The District Commissioner of Ileje District is Farida Mgomi.

== Wards ==
Ileje District is administratively divided into 16 wards:

- Bupigu
- Chitete
- Ibaba
- Ikinga
- Isongole
- Itale
- Itumba
- Kafule
- Lubanda
- Luswisi
- Malangali
- Mbebe
- Ndola
- Ngulilo
- Ngulugulu
- Sange
