= Isandula =

Ward in Mbozi, Mbeya, Tanzania

Isandula Kata ya Isandula
- Ward
- Location within Tanzania
- Coordinates: 9.2130777°S 32.865577°E
- Country: Tanzania
- Region: Mbeya Region
- District: Mbozi District
- Ward: Isandula

Population (2016)
  - Total: 10,807
- Time zone: UTC+3 (EAT)

Isandula is an administrative ward in the Mbozi District of the Mbeya Region of Tanzania. In 2016 the Tanzania National Bureau of Statistics report there were 10,807 people in the ward, from 14,549 in 2012.
