= Sange, Tanzania =

Coordinates: 9.411°S 33.492°E

Sange is an administrative ward in Ileje District, Songwe Region, Tanzania. According to the 2002 census, the ward had a total population of 4,396.
