= Ivuna =

Coordinates: 8°24′S 32°32′E

Ivuna is an administrative ward in Momba District, Songwe Region, Tanzania. According to the 2002 census, the ward has a total population of 21,690.

The Ivuna salt flats southeast of Lake Rukwa have been exploited for salt since the early 13th century, or before, to the 15th century. Significant amounts of Iron Age pottery have been found here.

The Ivuna meteorite was recovered in Ivuna during 1938.
