= Nyiha language =

Bantu language spoken in Tanzania and Zambia

Nyiha
- Ishinyiha
- Native to: Tanzania, Zambia, Malawi
- Ethnicity: Nyiha
- Native speakers: (670,000 cited 1987–1993)
- Language family: Niger–Congo?: Atlantic–Congo; Benue–Congo; Bantoid; Bantu; Rukwa; Mbozi; Mbeya; South; Nyiha

Language codes
- ISO 639-3: Either: nih – (Tanzania, Zambia) nyr – (Malawi)
- Glottolog: mboz1234
- Guthrie code: M.23

Nyiha (Nyixa, Nyika) is a Bantu language primarily spoken in Tanzania and Zambia. The language of the 10,000 speakers in Malawi is different enough to sometimes be considered a distinct language.
