= Msangano =

Coordinates: 8°58′S 32°34′E

Msangano is an administrative ward in Mbozi District, Songwe Region, Tanzania. According to the 2002 census, the ward has a total population of 11,813.
