= Ndalambo =

Coordinates: 9.0842°S 32.4990°E

Ndalambo is an administrative ward in Mbozi District, Songwe Region, Tanzania. According to the 2002 census, the ward has a total population of 9,029.
