= Ngulilo =

Coordinates: 9.249°S 33.445°E

Ngulilo is an administrative ward in Ileje District, Mbeya Region, Tanzania. According to the 2002 census, the ward has a total population of 3,820. The official language is Swahili, and much of the population does not know how to speak English.
