= Malangali, Ileje =

Coordinates: 9.549°S 33.461°E

Malangali is an administrative ward in Ileje District, Songwe Region, Tanzania. As of 2002, the ward had a total population of 10,066.
