= Safwa language =

Bantu language of Tanzania

Safwa
- Cisafwa, Ishisafwa
- Native to: Tanzania
- Ethnicity: Safwa people
- Native speakers: (160,000 cited 1987)
- Language family: Niger–Congo?: Atlantic–Congo; Benue–Congo; Bantoid; Bantu; Rukwa; Mbozi; Mbeya; Safwa

Language codes
- ISO 639-3: sbk
- Glottolog: safw1238
- Guthrie code: M.25

Safwa, or Kisawfa is a Bantu language spoken by the Safwa people of the Mbeya Region of Tanzania. Dialects are Guruka, Mbwila, Poroto, Songwe.

== Language characteristics ==
There is uncertainty regarding whether Kisafwa is a seven-vowel or five-vowel language. The question revolves around the contrasting ATR (Advanced Tongue Root) closed vowels, specifically i/ɪ and u/ʊ. It is possible that the distribution of the seven- or five-vowel system is influenced by geographical factors or sociolects shaped by age or other factors.

Labroussi (1999) notes that although Kisafwa maintains vowel length contrast, the distinction between ± ATR (i/ɪ and u/ʊ) is not as clear. As a result, Labroussi prefers to consider Kisafwa as a seven-vowel system that is gradually reducing to a five-vowel system. However, Voorhoeve (n.d.) describes Kisafwa as a five-vowel system due to difficulties in discerning differences in vowel quality.

Previous research conducted in the Mbeya-Iringa project has identified variations in the choice and morphophonological realization of noun class prefixes across different varieties (Eaton 2006). However, there is no available information on the extent to which these differences are distributed among the varieties.

Additionally, previous research has also observed several lexical differences. However, prior to this survey's research, sufficient data had not been collected to determine the significance of these lexical differences between the varieties.

== Sample words ==
People
English	Safwa
person	mtu
man	mwanamume
woman	mwanamke
mother	mama
father	baba
child	mtoto
son	mtoto wa kiume
daughter	mtoto wa kike
brother	kaka
