= Luswisi =

Coordinates: 9.356°S 33.542°E

Luswisi is an administrative ward in Ileje District, Mbeya Region, Tanzania. According to the 2002 census, the ward has a total population of 4,790.
