= Songwe District =

Songwe
- District
- location in Songwe Region
- Coordinates: 8.4238°S 33.0290°E
- Country: Tanzania
- Region: Songwe Region
- Established: 2015
- Capital: Mkwajuni

Government
  - Type: District council

Area
  - Total: 16,070 km^{2} (6,200 sq mi)
  - Land: 14,965 km^{2} (5,778 sq mi)
  - Water: 1,105 km^{2} (427 sq mi)

Population (2022 Census)
  - Total: 229,129
- Time zone: UTC+3 (EAT)
- Website: Official website

Songwe District is a district established in 2015 in Songwe Region, Tanzania.

== Wards ==
There are 18 wards in the Songwe District.

- Chang'ombe (9,038)
- Galula (9,602)
- Gua (7,433)
- Ifwenkenya (8,961)
- Kanga (10,729)
- Kapalala (3,298)
- Magamba (11,933)
- Manda (8,678)
- Mbangala (6,396)
- Mbuyuni (10,665)
- Mkwajuni ((17,398)
- Mpona (7,295)
- Mwambani (10,139)
- Namkukwe (7,617)
- Ngwala (3,432)
- Saza (7,632)
- Totowe (5,951)
- Udinde (5,905)
