= Kamsamba =

Coordinates: 8°20′S 32°18′E

Kamsamba is an administrative ward in Mbozi District, Songwe Region, Tanzania. According to the 2002 census, the ward has a total population of 15,353.
