= Christopher Mwashinga =

Tanzanian author

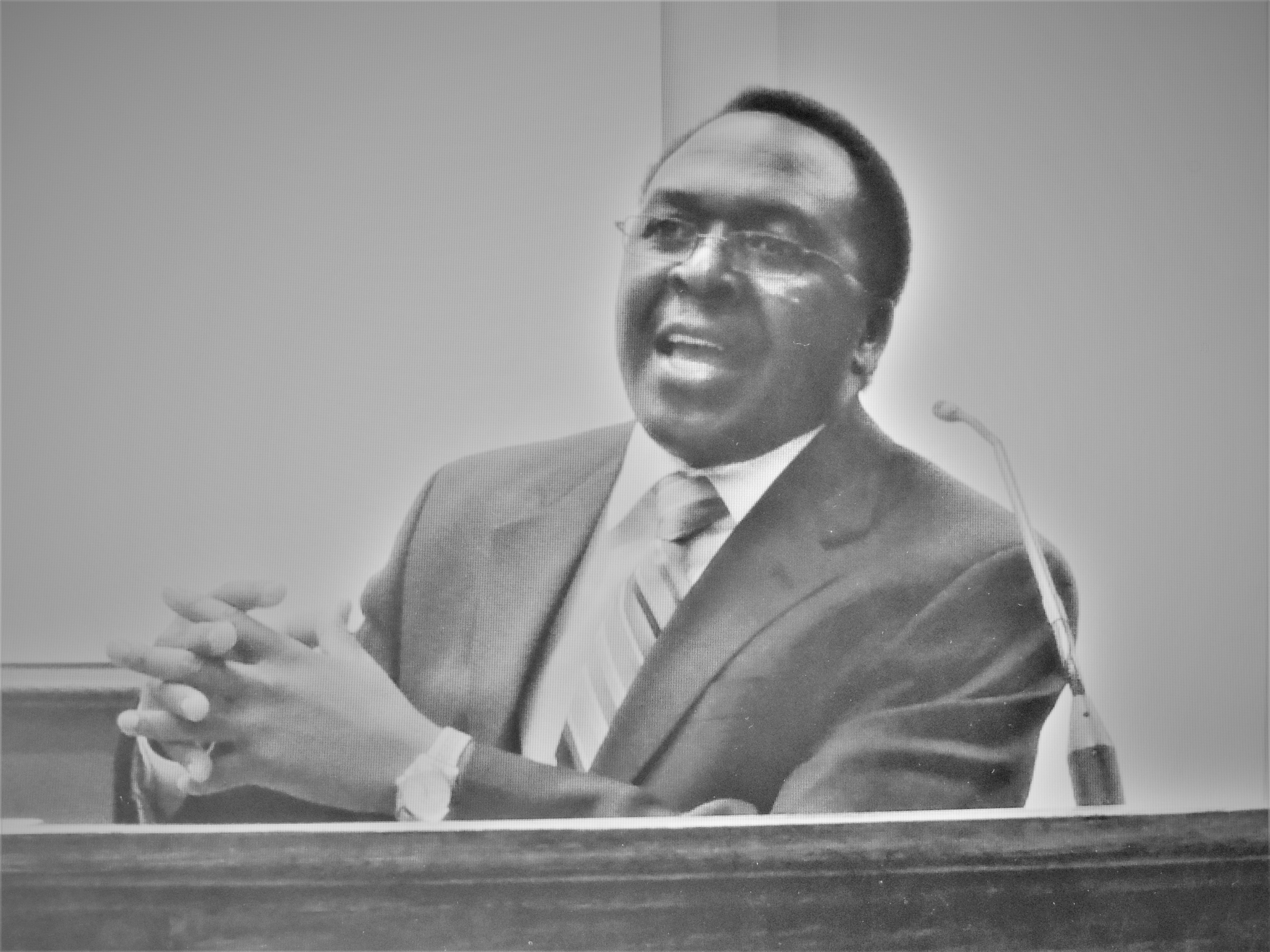
- Born: 9 January 1965 (age 61); Mbeya, Tanzania
- Education: University of Arusha; University of Eastern Africa, Baraton; and Andrews University
- Occupations: Christian minister, author, poet
- Spouse: Ruth M. Mwashinga
- Children: Christopher R. Mwashinga II, Anna Nakijwa Mwashinga, and Richard Aaron Mwashinga
- Writing career
- Language: English and Kiswahili
- Period: 21st Century
- Genres: non-fiction, Christian poetry
- Notable works: A History of Christianity in East Africa: The Beginning and Development of Missions (2020); Ocean of Grace (2016) Uadventista Barani Afrika: Changamoto na Fursa za Ukuaji (2017)

Christopher R. Mwashinga Jr (born 9 January 1965) is a Tanzanian author and poet from Mbeya, Tanzania who lives in the United States. He has published books of Christian poetry, theology, mission, and religious history. His poetry has been published in reputable anthologies in the United States, and other countries including Kenya, Singapore, and Tanzania. He writes in English and Kiswahili.

== Early life ==
Dr. Christopher Richard Mwashinga was born to Richard Male Mwashinga and Christine Mwashinga in the Igawilo ward of Mbeya, Tanzania. He spent his first 20 years in West Kilimanjaro about 1,000 kilometres (620 mi) from his home village in the southern highlands of Tanzania. He is the third of the eleven children born to his parents.

== Education ==
Dr. Mwashinga attended Ngare-Nairobi Primary School in West Kilimanjaro before he moved south to attend Igawilo Secondary School in Mbeya (O-Levels), and Songea Boys High School in Songea (A-Levels)–all in Tanzania. He was trained in Theology at the Tanzania Adventist College (now the University of Arusha) in Tanzania and the University of Eastern Africa, Baraton in Kenya where he earned a B.A. degree in theology. He then moved for graduate studies to the Seventh-day Adventist Theological Seminary on the campus of Andrews University, located at Berrien Springs, Michigan, US. At the seminary, Mwashinga earned two master's degrees: a Master of Divinity and a Master of Arts in religion (Systematic Theology). He earned his PhD in Systematic Theology in the same institution.

== Personal life ==
Dr. Mwashinga is married to Ruth Michael Mwashinga. Together they have three children: Christopher Richard Mwashinga II, Anna Nakijwa Mwashinga, and Richard Aaron Mwashinga. Mwashinga enjoys traveling to new cultures as he preaches and writes his Christian poetry and non-fiction.

== Youth and student ministry ==
For many years, Dr. Mwashinga, an ordained minister of the Seventh-day Adventist Church, served the youth and public university students in East Africa. Before going to the US for further studies he worked as a chaplain in charge of Public Campus Ministries in the South-West Tanzania Field (now Southern Highlands Conference) headquartered in Mbeya. He also served as director of several church departments in the Eastern Tanzania Conference of Seventh-day Adventists, including: Public Campus Ministries, Youth, Education, Children's Ministries, Public Affairs and Religious Liberty, and as coordinator of the Satellite Evangelism Program for the same conference. During his tenure, Mwashinga started a program he called Campus Evangelistic Campaigns (CEC) which was responsible for organizing and running evangelistic campaigns in major public universities in Tanzania. Between 2000 and 2004 he personally conducted big evangelistic campaigns in Sokoine University of Agriculture, University of Dar es Salaam, and Mzumbe University, utilizing major university auditoriums such as Nkrumah Hall (University of Dar es Salaam), New Assembly Hall (Mzumbe University) and Multi-purpose Hall (Sokoine University of Agriculture), among others. He also spoke to university communities in a number of Kenyan universities including the University of Nairobi, Moi University, and the University of Eastern Africa, Baraton. His was a familiar voice in many of these centers of learning. He also spoke internationally, visiting universities around the world. For the past twenty years, Mwashinga has traveled widely, representing the Seventh-day Adventist Church in international conferences and preaching assignments. Between 2000 and 2021 alone, he crossed the Atlantic 18 times. His ministry and study tours took him to Brazil, Canada, the United States, the Netherlands, the United Kingdom, Germany, Rwanda, Uganda, Thailand, Kenya, Greece, Turkey, Egypt, Tanzania, Israel, the Czech Republic, and Zambia among others. During those international trips, he presented on a variety of subjects and wrote hundreds of letters and emails. He also wrote hundreds of poems both English and Kiswahili, and always kept a diary.

== Non-fiction and Christian poetry ==
Dr. Christopher Mwashinga began to write and recite poetry at a fairly young age. He was about 13 when his first piece was published in Kilimanjaro Leo a weekly Kiswahili Newspaper in his native country of Tanzania. Since then he has published six collections of English poems, including: Beeches of Golden Sand: Inspirational Poems (2009) Windows of Love (2012), and Ocean of Grace (2016)., Collected Poems: 1991-2021, He has also published eleven collections of Kiswahili poetry including Sauti Toka Ughaibuni (Voice From the Diaspora),, Kilele Cha Tumaini (Summit of Hope), and Tumaini Lenye Baraka: Diwani ya Christopher Mwashinga (The Blessed Hope), Njia ya Matumaini, Mwenge wa Matumaini. Furthermore, he has published more than twenty other books both scholarly and popular, mostly in the area of theology, mission, and history of Christianity. The most notable works in the area of non-fiction are perhaps his books on Mission Theology and a History of Christian Missions in East Africa, Uadventista Barani Afrika: Changamoto na Fursa za Ukuaji (Adventism in Africa: Challenges and Opportunities for Growth), and The Works of Christopher Mwashinga in multiple volumes.

== Membership in professional organizations ==
- Adventist Theological Society
- American Academy of Religion
- Michigan Academy of Science, Arts, and Letters
- American Academy of Poets
- Evangelical Theological Society

== Publications ==
Non-fiction

- 2011: Rays of Hope: Living to Make a Difference ISBN 9780983232216
- 2012: Enduring the Cross: Messages of Salvation and Hope ISBN 978-0-9832322-0-9
- 2013: Utume na Ukristo Katika Afrika MasharikiISBN 978-9987-9460-1-3
- 2013: Mission Theology and a History of Christian Missions in East Africa ISBN 978-0-9832322-5-4
- 2013: Barua na Mashairi ISBN 978-0-9832322-6-1
- 2014: Insights From Bible Lands: Turkey, Israel, Egypt, and Greece ISBN 978-0-9832322-7-8
- 2014: Waadventista wa Sabato na Utunzaji wa Sabato: Historia Fupi ISBN 978-9987-9460-5-1
- 2016: Moments of my Christian Experience ISBN 978-9987-9460-7-5
- 2017: Uadventista Barani Afrika: Changamoto na Fursa za Ukuaji ISBN 978-9987-9460-2-0
- 2018: Kumtumaini Yesu ISBN 978-9976-5177-0-5
- 2019: Crisscrossing the United States. ISBN 978-1693352263
- 2020: Waraka wa Paulo kwa Waefeso. ISBN 979-8666909997
- 2020: A History of Christianity in East Africa: The Beginning and Development of Missions ISBN 979-8669049034
- 2022: Christ on Campus: Meeting Jesus on University Campus ISBN 9798362783778
- 2026: Ujumbe wa Malaika Watatu: Maisha na Utume wa John Aza Kisaka ISBN 9798185897300

Poetry

- 2009: Beaches of Golden Sand: Inspirational Poems ISBN 978-0-615-30674-2
- 2012: Windows of Love ISBN 978-0-9832322-30
- 2014: Sauti Toka Ughaibuni ISBN 978-9987-9460-3-7
- 2016: Kilele cha Tumaini ISBN 978-9987-9460-9-9
- 2016: Ocean of Grace ISBN 978-1524620974
- 2017: Tumaini Lenye Baraka: Diwani ya Christopher Mwashinga ISBN 978-0-990-32931-2
- 2018: Sauti ya Faraja na Matumaini ISBN 978-9976-5177-1-2
- 2019: Mdomo Mmoja, Masikio Mawili: Mashairi ya Watoto ISBN 978-9976-5177-3-6
- 2019: Short Poems of Christopher Mwashinga ISBN 978-1696-7894-3-1
- 2020: Mionzi ya Matumaini ISBN 9798656208864
- 2021: Njia ya Matumaini ISBN 979-8514262328
- 2021: Collected Poems of Christopher Mwashinga: 1991–2021 ISBN 9798795994154
- 2022: Mwenge wa Matumaini ISBN 979-8409199289
- 2023: Pwani ya Matumaini ISBN 9798868370052
- 2024: Mashairi ya Christopher Mwashinga: Akademia Juzuu ya 1 ISBN 9798876149060
- 2024: Mashairi Ya Christopher Mwashinga: Akademia, Juzuu Ya 2 ISBN 979-8345221402
- 2024: The Shore of Hope ISBN 979-8302205506
- 2024: The Shore of Hope: Bilingual Edition-English-Swahili ISBN 979-8303846012
- 2024: Asubuhi ya Matumaini ISBN 979-8307617687

The Works of Christopher Mwashinga project 1 (English)

- 2014: The Works of Christopher Mwashinga Vol. I, Letters ISBN 978-0-9832322-8-5
- 2014: The Works of Christopher Mwashinga Vol. II, Sermons, Addresses, and PoemsISBN 978-0-9832322-9-2
- 2020: The Works of Christopher Mwashinga Vol. III, Theology and Mission ISBN 978-0-9903293-4-3
- 2017: The Works of Christopher Mwashinga Vol. IV, Journals and Diaries (1), ISBN 978-0-9903293-2-9
- 2025: The Works of Christopher Mwashinga Vol. VIII, Miscellaneous ISBN 9798316136865
- 2025: The Works of Christopher Mwashinga Vol. IX, The Salvation of the Unevangelized ISBN 979-8269214320

The Works of Christopher Mwashinga project 2 (Swahili)

- 2019: Kazi za Christopher Mwashinga, Juzuu ya I: Maandiko ya Awali ISBN 978-9976-5177-2-9
- 2020: Kazi za Christopher Mwashinga, Juzuu II: Mashairi ISBN 978-9976-5177-5-0
- 2020: Kazi za Christopher Mwashinga, Juzuu III: Utume, Theolojia, Mahubiri, Barua ISBN 978-9976-5177-7-4

Journal Articles

- Mwashinga, Christopher R (2016). "Global South Christianity and Adventism: Trends and Implications". Andrews University Seminary Student Journal. 2 (1). Berrien Springs, Michigan: 33–51.
- Mwashinga, Christopher R (2017). "Relationship between Social and Economic Status and Witchcraft in Africa". Journal of Adventist Mission Studies. 13 (1). Berrien Springs, Michigan: 23–32. doi:10.32597/jams/vol13/iss1/4/.
- Mwashinga, Christopher R (2019). "Personality of the Holy Spirit: A Biblical, Historical, and Theological Investigation". Journal of the Adventist Theological Society. 30 (1–2). Berrien Springs, Michigan: 163–178.
- Mwashinga, Christopher R (2020). "Adventism in East Africa: Were the Initial Mission Strategies Effective?". Andrews University Seminary Student Journal. 4 (1–2). Berrien Springs, Michigan: 73–88.

== See also ==
- Seventh-day Adventist Church
- Ellen G. White
- Adventist
- Adventist Health Studies
- Sabbath in Christianity
- History of the Seventh-day Adventist Church
- 28 fundamental beliefs
- Questions on Doctrine
- Biblical Research Institute
- Teachings of Ellen White#End times
- Inspiration of Ellen White
- Prophecy in the Seventh-day Adventist Church
- Investigative judgment
- The Pillars of Adventism
- Conditional Immortality
- Historicism
- Three Angels' Messages
- Inspiration of Ellen White
- Ellen G. White
