= Vwawa =

Capital of Songwe Region, Tanzania

Coordinates: 9°07′00″S 32°56′00″E

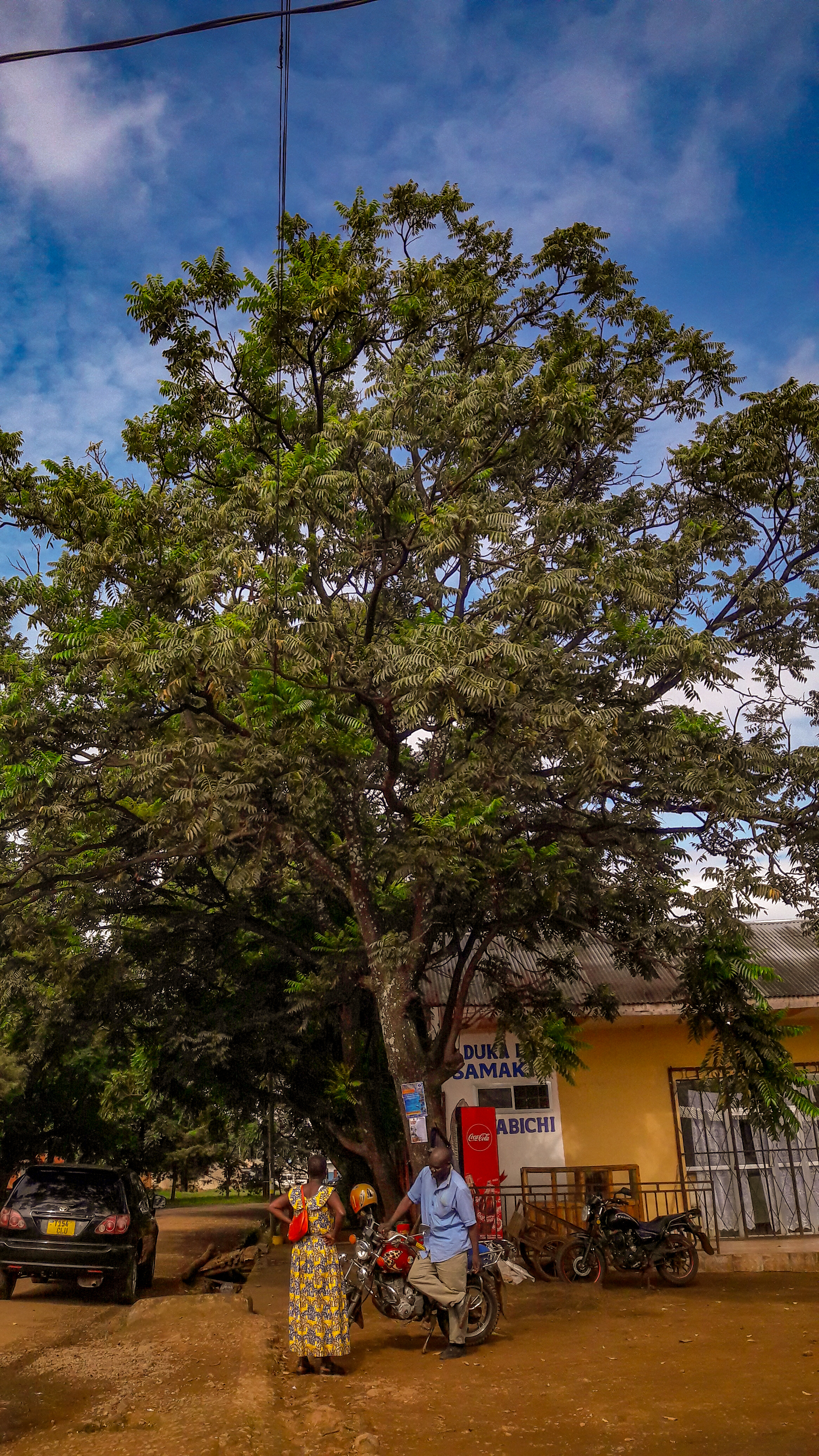

Vwawa (Swahili: Mji wa Vwavwa) is a town and an administrative ward in Mbozi District and the location of the headquarters of Songwe Region, Tanzania. According to the 2002 census, the ward had a total population of 37 844.

The major tribe found in Vwawa is Nyiha, but other tribes include Ndali, Chaggas, Nyakyusa and Lambyas. According to 2012 Tanzanian census, the population of Vwawa was 65 625 people, including 26 372 males and 29 884 females. The main economic activity is agriculture.

== See also ==
- Railway stations in Tanzania
