= Sange, Bhiwandi =

Village in Maharashtra

Sange
- village
- Location in Maharashtra, India Sange (India)
- Coordinates: 19.2982099°N 73.1688878°E
- Country: India
- State: Maharashtra
- District: Thane
- Taluka: Bhiwandi
- Elevation: 14 m (46 ft)

Population (2011)
  - Total: 475
- Time zone: UTC+5:30 (IST)
- 2011 census code: 552633

Sange is a village in the Thane district of Maharashtra, India. It is located in the Bhiwandi taluka.

== Demographics ==
According to the 2011 census of India, Sange has 108 households. The effective literacy rate (i.e. the literacy rate of population excluding children aged 6 and below) is 73.58%.

Demographics (2011 Census)
	Total	Male	Female
Population	475	255	220
Children aged below 6 years	51	27	24
Scheduled caste	77	45	32
Scheduled tribe	76	40	36
Literates	312	186	126
Workers (all)	201	138	63
Main workers (total)	65	60	5
Main workers: Cultivators	3	2	1
Main workers: Agricultural labourers	1	0	1
Main workers: Household industry workers	0	0	0
Main workers: Other	61	58	3
Marginal workers (total)	136	78	58
Marginal workers: Cultivators	50	25	25
Marginal workers: Agricultural labourers	5	2	3
Marginal workers: Household industry workers	1	1	0
Marginal workers: Others	80	50	30
Non-workers	274	117	157
