= Mungu =

Mungu could refer to:

- The word for God in Swahili
- Archaic name for Mongolia, a country in East Asia
- Mungu Crater, a volcanic crater in Tanzania

== See also ==
- Mulungu
