= Nyiha people =

Ethnic group from Mbeya Region of Tanzania

The Nyiha are a Bantu ethnolinguistic group of Mbeya Region, Tanzania and northeastern Zambia. In 1993, the Nyiha population was estimated to number 626,000, of which 306,000 were in Tanzania and 320,000 were in Zambia.

The Nyiha are scattered widely through East Africa but are found mostly in clusters near the corridor of land between lakes Nyasa, Rukwa and Tanganyika, around Mbozi, and in the general area of the Lyagalile district of Ufipa.

== Culture ==
In 1915, the Nyiha consisted of fewer than 10,000 people, but by 1957 their population had risen to over 55,000 people. They were divided into eleven or twelve unrelated chiefdoms, with the chiefs being referred to as Mwene. The Nyiha speaks a language that sounds similar to the Bungu of present day Songwe district (areas of Mkwajuni, formerly known as part of Chunya district), Lambya people of Ileje district who shares similar clan names such as Mwazembe, Mwampashe, Mwasenga, Simfukwe, etc., and Nyika people of Rukwa region (Laela area, with a notable figure, the late Honorable Chrisant Majiyatanga Mzindakaya). It is not quite clear how the Nyika found themselves settling in Laela living Nyamwanga between them and their Nyiha counterparts who seem to be more related at least by language. However, this might be explained by the fact that the two tribes are said to have migrated from some parts of Zambia and crossed the border into the present-day areas of Tanzania (Rukwa and Songwe regions).

The Nyiha had reputations not only as warriors but also as elephant hunters. Blacksmiths, who had considerable status in the society, created hoes, axes, and knives, and also wire for jewelry and traps. Over the course of time, however, the smiths lost their considerable prestige as iron from Germany became cheaper.

Cotton weaving was common, as was pottery-making by women. Mat- and basket-making, iron-working by the men, and collecting salt from the Lake Rukwa area for barter were all means of their livelihood, although they thought of themselves as being primarily communal hunters. Despite all of these activities, however, their main means of livelihood was the agricultural cultivation of finger millet, facilitated by the slash and burn method.
