= Igawilo =

Ward in Mbeya, Tanzania

Igawilo Kata ya Igawilo
- Ward
- Location within Tanzania Location within Africa
- Coordinates: 8°37′S 34°40′E
- Country: Tanzania
- Region: Mbeya Region
- District: Mbeya Urban
- Ward: Igawilo

Population (2016)
  - Total: 19,067
- Time zone: UTC+3 (EAT)
- Postcode: 53134

Igawilo is an administrative ward in the Mbeya Urban district of the Mbeya Region of Tanzania. In 2016 the Tanzania National Bureau of Statistics report there were 19,067 people in the ward, from 17,300 in 2012.

== Neighborhoods ==
The ward has 4 neighborhoods.

- Chemchem
- Mponja
- Mwanyanje
- Sokoni
