= Isoka District =

Coordinates: 10°00′S 33°00′E

- District
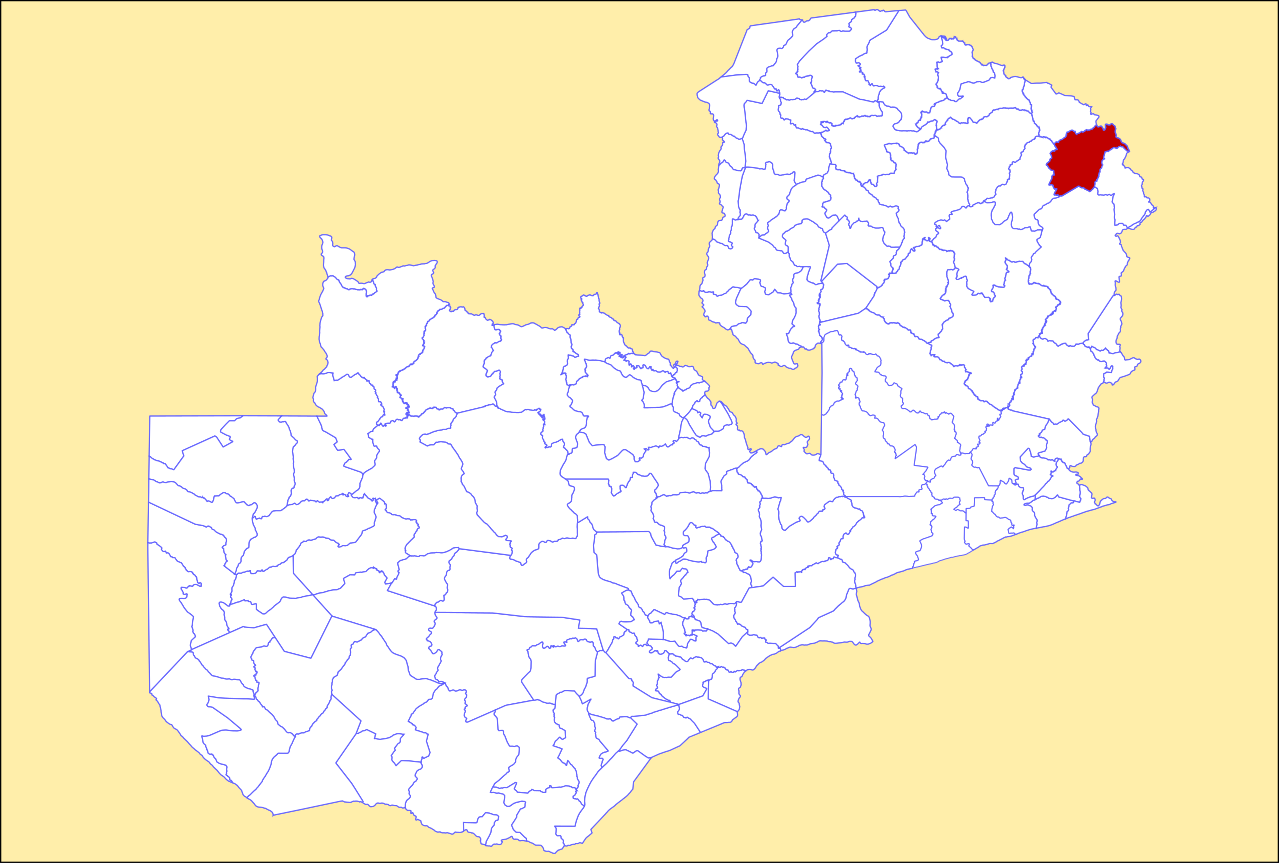
- District location in Zambia
- Country: Zambia
- Province: Muchinga Province
- Capital: Isoka

Area
  - Total: 4,817 km^{2} (1,860 sq mi)

Population (2022)
  - Total: 111,599
  - Density: 23.17/km^{2} (60.00/sq mi)
- Time zone: UTC+2 (CAT)

Isoka District is a district of Zambia, located in Muchinga Province. The capital lies at Isoka. As of the 2022 Zambian Census, the district had a population of 111,599 people.
