= Kyungu =

Kyungu is a traditional authority in Karonga District in the Northern Region of Malawi of the Lambya people. The district is mainly inhabited by the Tumbuka and Ngonde.

The Kyungu was the "supreme ritual head of the [Ngonde] kingdom with all the political authority which that might bestow upon him".

== Paramount Chief Kyungu ==
The current paramount Chief is Kyungu Nsangalufu Clement Mwakabanga III who was elevated to the position by former President of Malawi, Joyce Banda. There has been some controversies surrounding him and paramount Chief Karonga in recent years as a result of changes in administration and politics. He was recognized as Chief by President Joyce Banda in 2012.

== Dynasty ==
1550 Kyungu Mwenenkhonde

1550 -1580 Kyungu Ngulube

1580 -1610 Kyungu Lyambilo

1610-1640 Kyungu Kameme Mwenembako

1640-1670 Kyungu Kyabala

1670-1700 Kyungu Shora Kiposa

1700-1730 Kyungu Mwakalosi Mwenitete

1730-1760 Kyungu Maghemo

1760-1790 Kyungu Kisyombe

1790-1820 Kyungu Mwenenguwe

1820-1850 Kyungu Mwafongo

1850-1868 Kyungu Gwazapasi Kalambo

1868-1870 Kyungu Mwabulambo

1870-1875 Kyungu Mwangonde

1875-1888 Kyungu Mpeta Mwakasungula

1888-1894 Kyungu Mwambelo

1894-1904 Kyungu Mwakabanga

1904-1932 Kyungu Fwangalubilo Mwangalaba

1932-1966 Kyungu Pitala Mwangalaba

1966-1967 Kyungu Stanford Mwanyongo

1967-1973 Kyungu Kapote Mwakasungula

1973-2006 Kyungu Gibson Mwangolera- *Kyabala 1*

2006-2011 Kyungu Lackson Mwanyongo- *Kyabala 2*

2011- current Kyungu Clement Mwakasungula- *Kyabala- 3*

== Floods ==
Kyungu area is prone to floods. In March 2013, flood displaced people in the area.
