= Nakonde District =

Coordinates: 9.3336°S 32.7558°E

- District
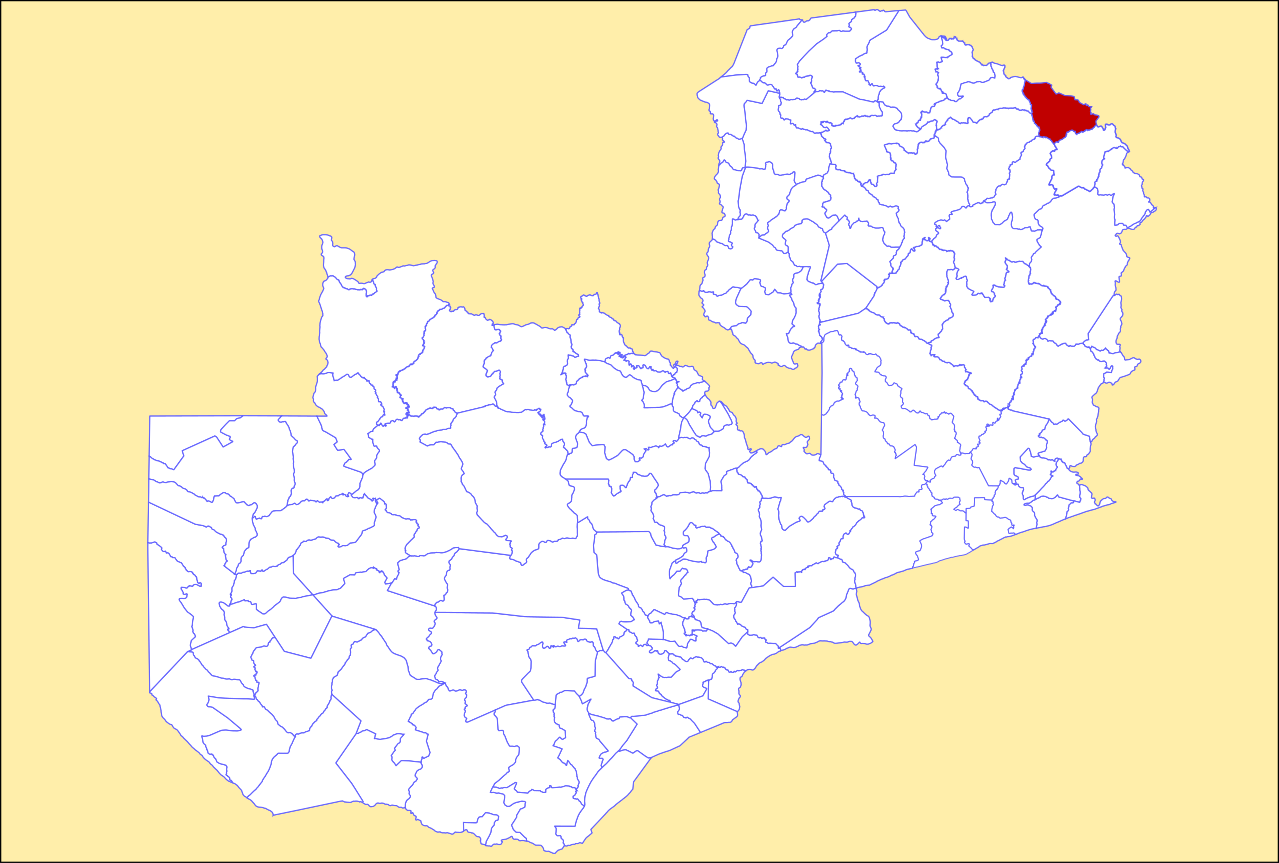
- District location in Zambia
- Country: Zambia
- Province: Muchinga Province
- Capital: Nakonde

Area
  - Total: 4,808.8 km^{2} (1,856.7 sq mi)

Population (2022)
  - Total: 178,788
  - Density: 37.179/km^{2} (96.294/sq mi)
- Time zone: UTC+2 (CAT)

Nakonde District is a district of Zambia, located in Muchinga Province. The capital lies at Nakonde. As of the 2022 Zambian Census, the district had a population of 178,788 people.
