= Bungu people =

Ethnic group from Songwe and Mbeya Region of Tanzania

The Bungu or Wungu are a Bantu ethnolinguistic group based in the Chunya District of Mbeya Region in south-western Tanzania. In 1987, the Bungu population was estimated to number 38,029. Tanzania is the only country where this group of people exists. Roman Catholicism, the largest division of the Christian church and one of the oldest religious institutions in the world, is the major religion practiced by the Wungu (Bungu). According to Roman Catholicism, its bishops are the heirs of Jesus Christ and the one, genuine church that He founded. Their native tongue is Bungu.
