= Songwe Region =

Region of Tanzania

Songwe Region Mkoa wa Songwe (Swahili)
- Region
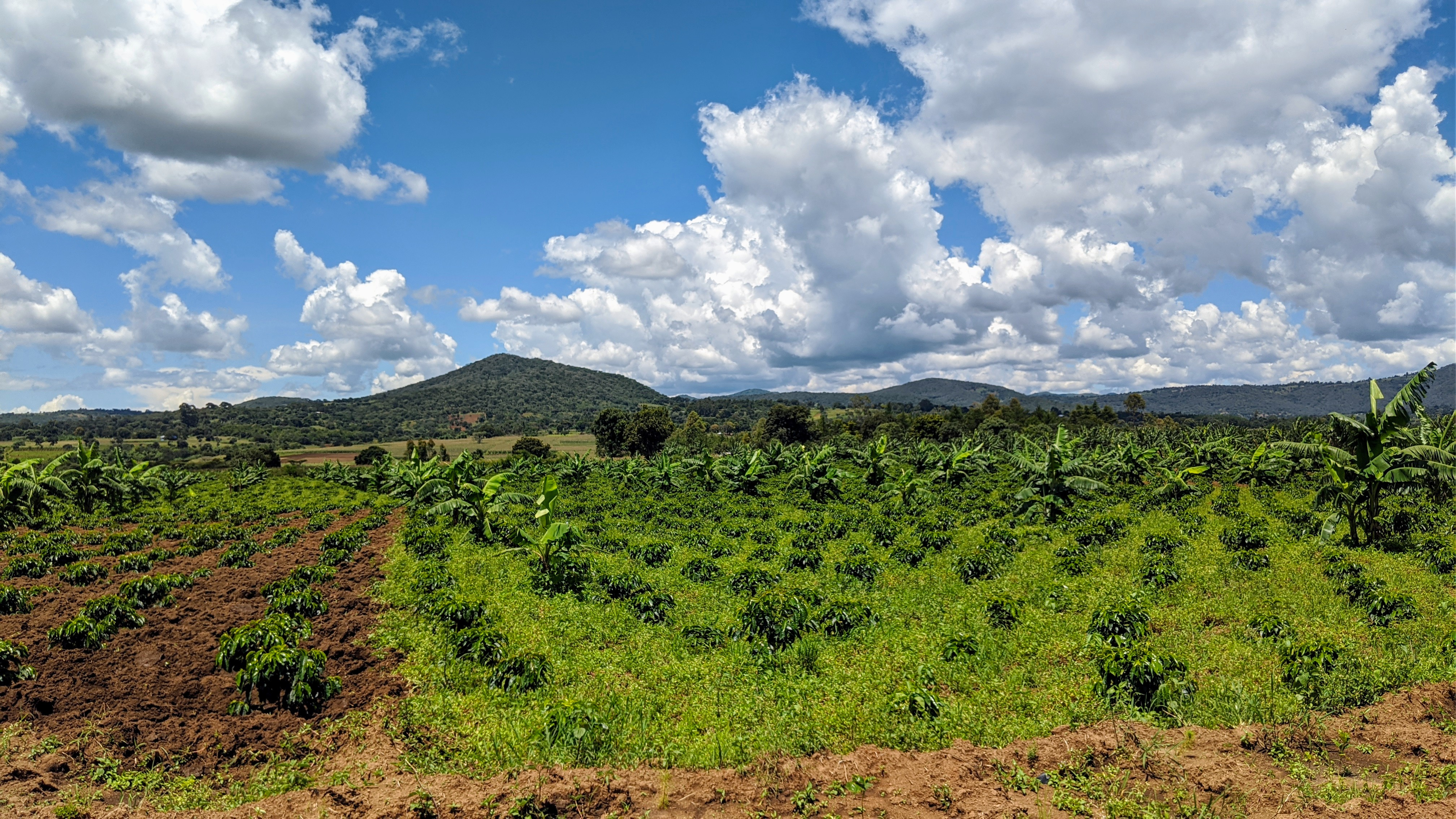
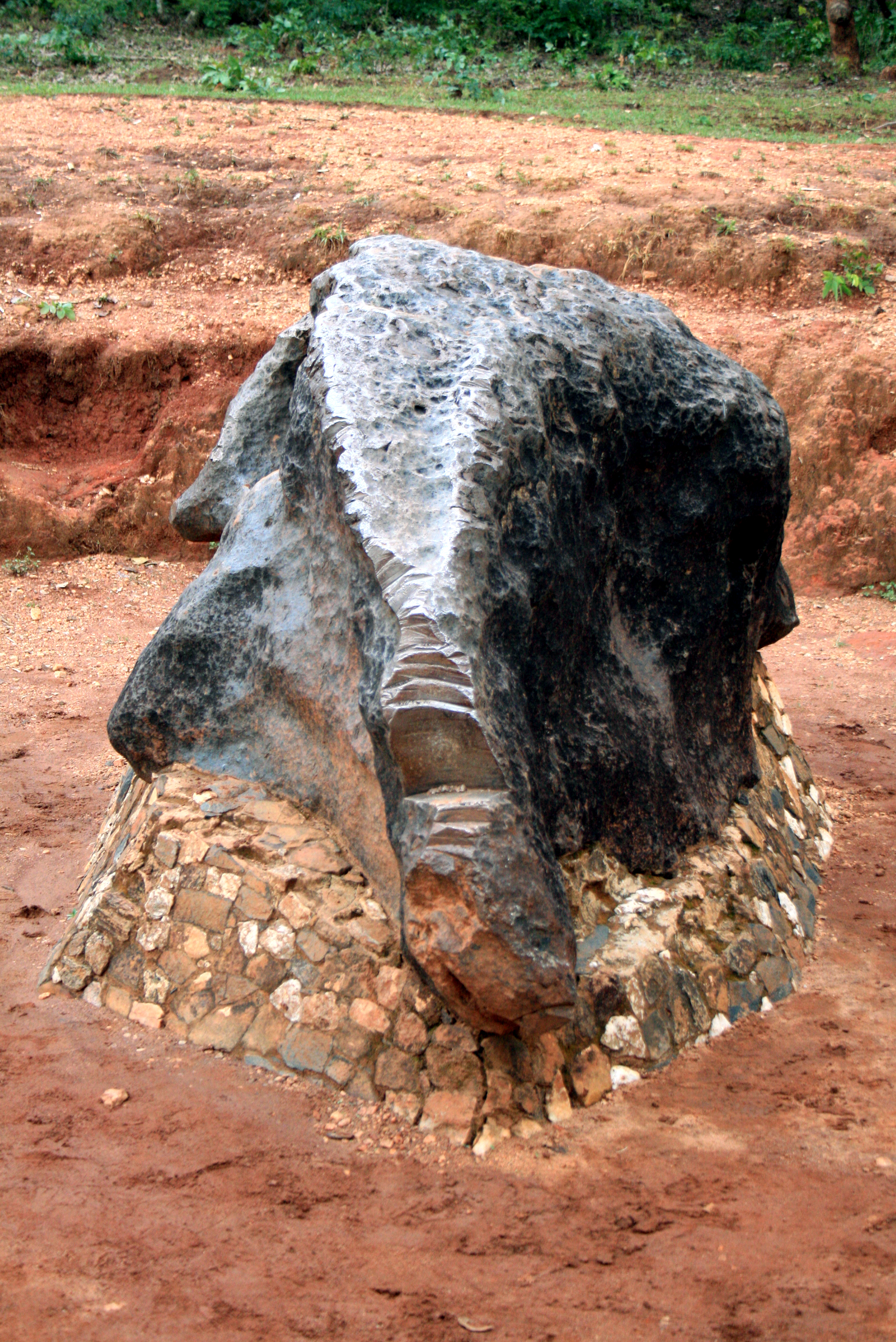
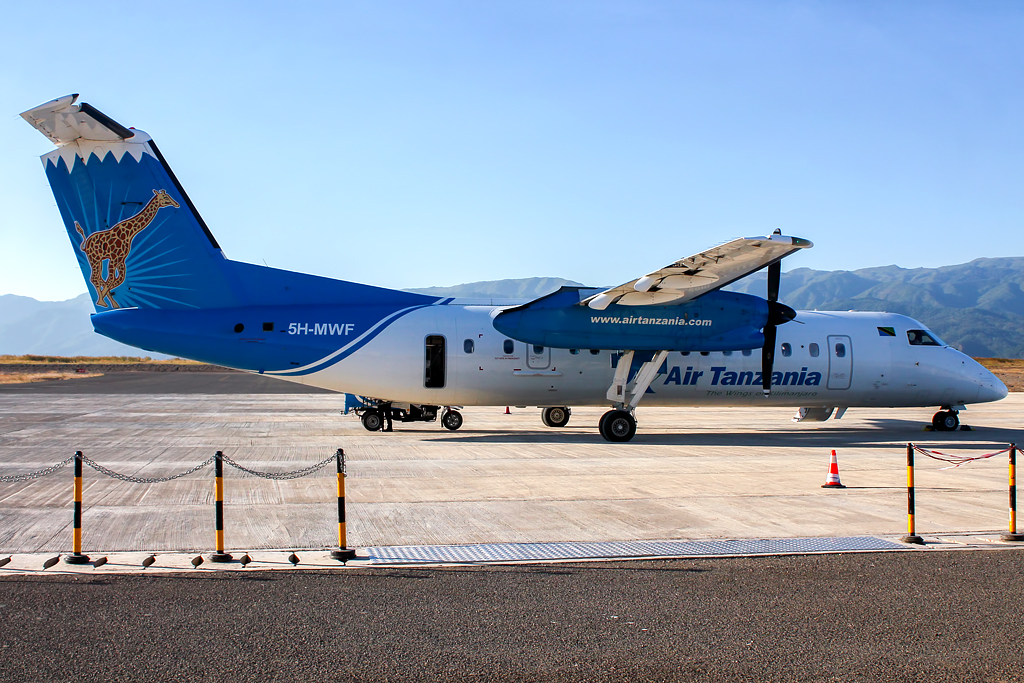
- From top to bottom: Coffee farm in Songwe, Mbosi meteorite & Songwe Airport
- Nicknames: Tanzania's door; Door of Tanzania
- Location in Tanzania
- Coordinates: 8°31′25.68″S 32°32′14.28″E
- Country: Tanzania
- Zone: Lake
- Region: 29 January 2016
- Capital: Vwawa
- Districts: List: Ileje District; Mbozi District; Momba District; Songwe District

Government
  - Regional Commissioner: Waziri Kindamba (CCM)

Area
  - Total: 27,656 km^{2} (10,678 sq mi)
  - Land: 26,595 km^{2} (10,268 sq mi)
  - Water: 1,061 km^{2} (410 sq mi)
  - Rank: 14th of 31

Population (2022)
  - Total: 1,344,687
  - Rank: 22nd of 31
  - Density: 50.562/km^{2} (130.95/sq mi)
- Demonym: Songwean

Ethnic groups
  - Settler: Swahili
  - Native: Nyamwanga, Mambwe, Ndali, Nyiha, Wungu, Wandya & Kimbu
- Time zone: UTC+3 (EAT)
- Postcode: 53xxx
- ISO 3166 code: TZ-31
- Website: Official website
- Symbols of Tanzania
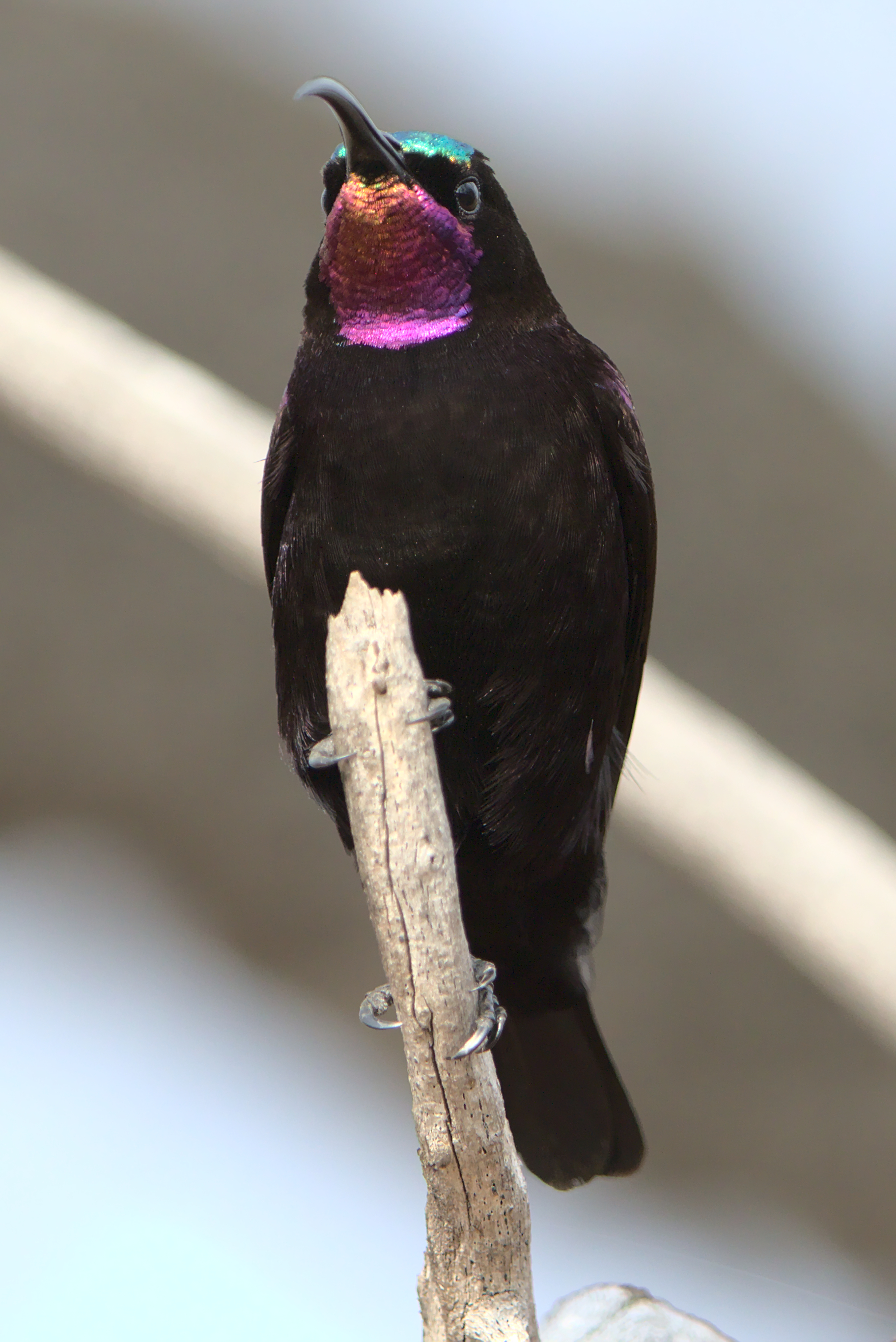
- Bird: Amethyst sunbird

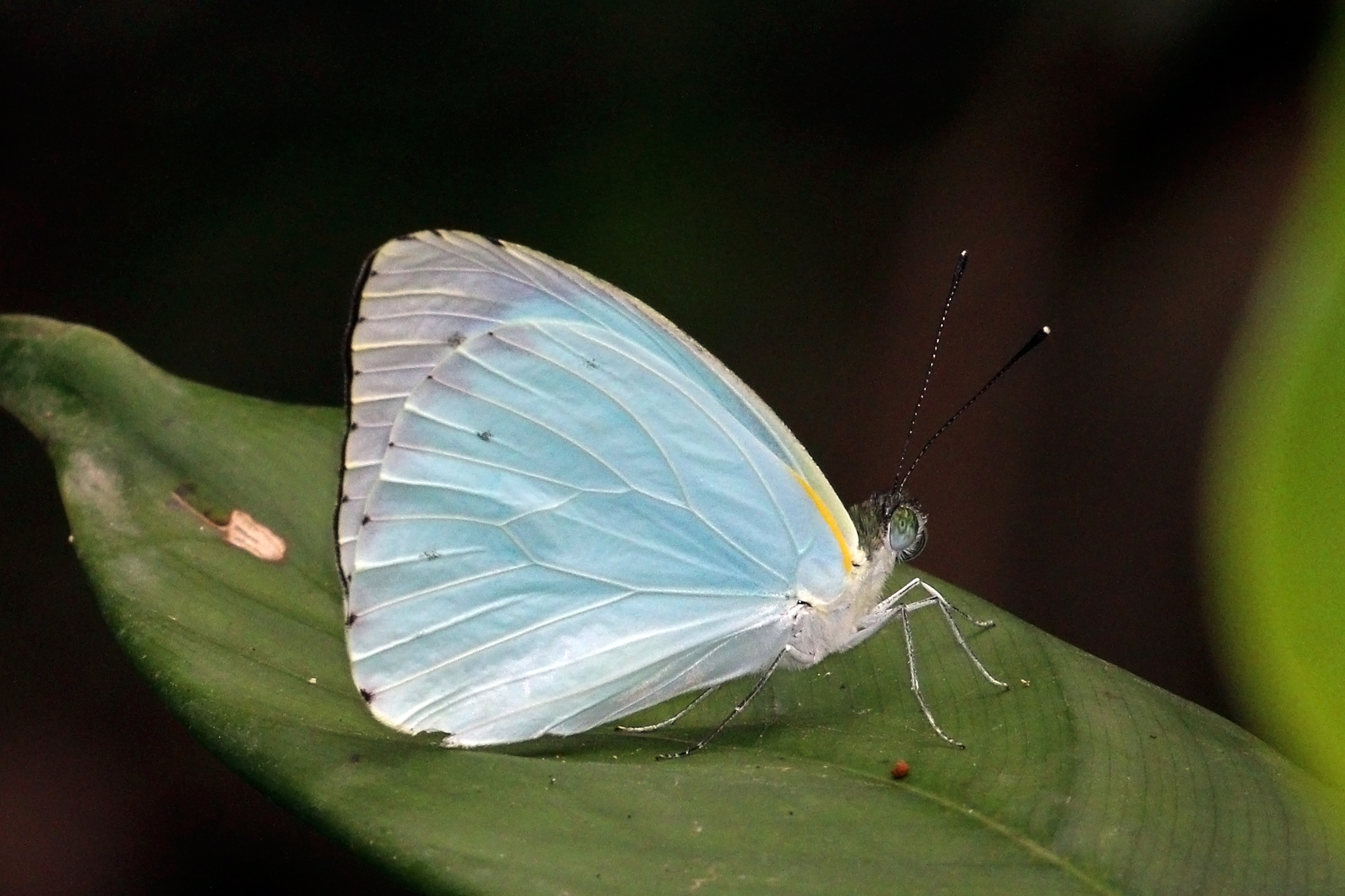
- Butterfly: Cambridge vagrant
- Fish: Lake Rukwa tilapia
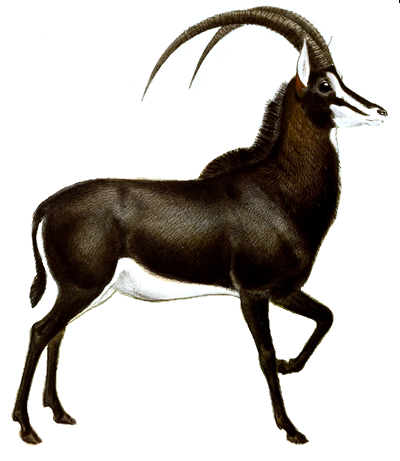
- Mammal: Sable antelope

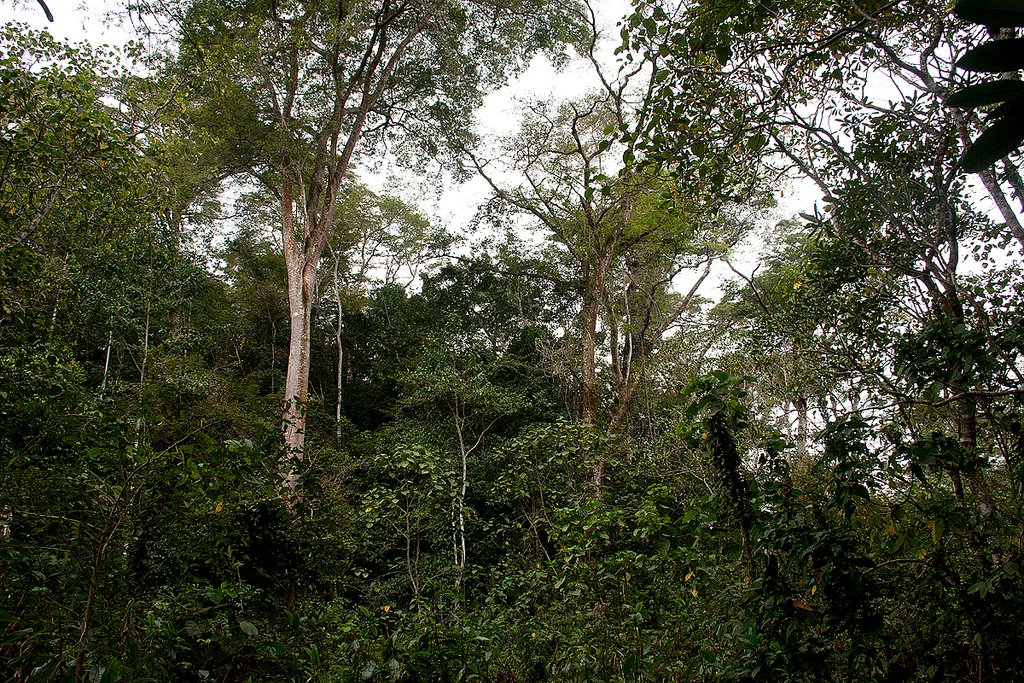
- Tree: Newtonia

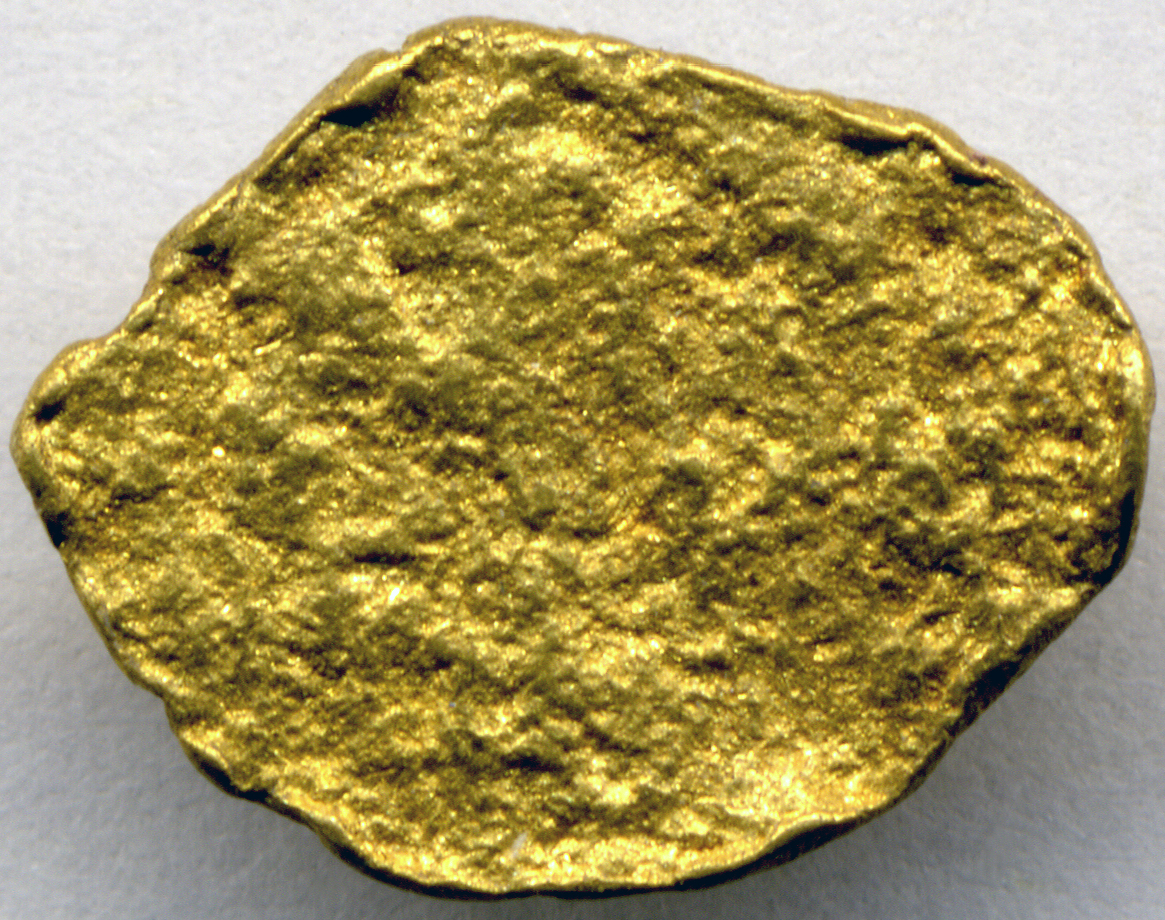
- Mineral: Gold

Songwe Region (Swahili: Mkoa wa Songwe) is one of Tanzania's 31 administrative regions. The region covers a land area of 27,656 km^{2} (10,678 sq mi). The region is comparable in size to the combined land area of the nation state of Haiti. Songwe Region borders the countries of Zambia and Malawi to the south: Tunduma is the main entry point into Zambia while Isongole is the main entry point into Malawi. Songwe also borders the Tanzanian regions of Rukwa and Katavi in the west, Tabora in the north, and Mbeya in the east. Lake Rukwa is a major body of water in the western part of the region. The region was created on 29 January 2016 from the western half of Mbeya Region. The regional capital is Vwawa. According to the 2022 national census, the region had a population of 1,344,687.

== Geography ==
The Songwe Region is situated in Tanzania's southern highlands, between latitudes 7° and 9° 36' south of the equator, and between longitudes 30° and 33° 41' east of the Greenwich meridian. The region is part of the Southern Highlands of Tanzania.

=== Climate ===
The East African Great Rift Valley's northern and western arms extend from north of Lake Nyasa, creating the naturally tropical Songwe Region. From early September to late April, the region enjoys the hot season, and from May to late August, the cold season. In the lowlands of Lake Rukwa, Songwe, and Momba, the greatest temperatures reach 25 °C, while in the mountains around Mbozi, Tunduma, and Ileje, they reach 16 °C. The Songwe Region only experiences one lengthy rainy season, which typically lasts from November to mid-May of the following year and averages between 750 mm and 2000 mm annually.

== Economy ==
=== Agriculture ===
Since agriculture employs roughly 75% of households in the Songwe Region and forms the backbone of income for the local economy, it is the region's main economic activity. Due to the region's favorable weather for agriculture and the composition of the soil, the sector has better control. One of the top 7 agricultural producers in the country is the Songwe region.

The Songwe Region is well known for producing food crops and is one of the best regions for cultivating them. Several food crops, including maize, paddy, beans, sorghum, sweet potatoes, bananas, and potatoes, are grown in the region. In the area, maize production has been higher than that of beans, paddy, and rice.

Additionally, the region is well known for producing a number of cash crops, primarily coffee, pyrethrum, sunflower, sesame, tobacco, and peanut. The crops provide the area's inhabitants with a significant source of income. Among the region's cash crops, coffee has the largest market share, followed by sesame and sunflower.

The Songwe Region's and its inhabitants' livelihoods are significantly influenced by the livestock sector. Numerous animals are kept by Songwe, including pigs (79,513), chickens (79,513), donkeys (4,739), goats (244,024), sheep (33,599), and 410,390 cattle (1,137,708). A popular activity in Songwe Region's Songwe and Momba District Councils along Lake Rukwa is fishing. People who live near the lake often earn a living by fishing.

=== Industry ===
The industrial economy in Songwe Region has drawn a number of investments. 57.24 percent of all small-scale investments were made in 2015 to support various industries and services, including maize milling. At the district level, Mbozi had the most small-scale businesses—1, 258 in all—followed by Tunduma (358), Ileje (330), Momba (222), and Songwe, which had the fewest—152. Milling machines (1,328) and carpentry (559), welding (158), garage (130), and oil processing were the top four small-scale enterprises, out of a total of 2,320.

=== GDP ===
The Songwe Region had a Human Development Index (HDI) of 0.656 and a GDP per capita of TZS 2,301,974 according to the 2017 Tanzania Human Development Report (THDR)1. The study found that the average lifespan in the area was 58.3 years.

=== Transport ===
Both the Tanzam Highway and the TAZARA Railway run through Vwawa and Tunduma in the southern part of the Songwe Region. Tanzam refers to the Tanzania -Zambia Highway, while TAZARA refers to the Tanzania and Zambia Railway Authority that was completed in 1975 to facilitate transportation of heavy goods and people between the two countries with the help of the Chinese government.

=== Tourism ===
Natural and cultural attractions can be found in Songwe Region. Historic locations including Nyayo za Watu wa Kale, Galula Catholic Church Mti wa Mapumziko-Wakoloni, Kisima cha Wakoloni, Jiwe la, Michoro ya Kale, Unyayo Kwenye Mwamba, Mwenetontela and Makaburi ya Wakoloni. Sceneic mountains found in Songwe Region include; Kwimba Mountain, Kipala Mountain, Linzitwa Cave, Mount Ilomwa, Kisumbuzi Mountain Kasitu Mountain, Chingambo Mountain, Mount Mwenekawenga, Mount Pungwe, Mount Chingambo, Mount Mlomba,Mount Ng'ongo, Mount Malinga.

Forest reserves in Songwe Region are Kaisumbe Forest, Tiru Forest, Msawe Forest, Mengo Forest, Nonda Chambo Forest, Champande Forest And Chingambo Forest. Rivers include Momba River and Songwe River.

== Population ==
The first communities in the region are the Bantu peoples. The native communities in the region are the Nyiha, Nyamwanga, Ndali, Manda,Bungu and Lambya <Mbozi District>. The Nyiha are the majority and the indigenous ethnic group living in Mbozi District, Ndali and Lambya in Ileje, Bungu and Manda in Songwe, while Nyamwanga is known to be the indigenous of Momba District. Nyihas are the largest ethnic group in the region with an estimated population of 450,000 by 2017.

=== Demographics ===
The local government areas now comprising Songwe Region reported a combined population of 998,862 in the 2012 census, 46 percent of whom were under 15 years old. The same areas reported a population of 723,480 in the 2002 Tanzanian census, yielding an annual population growth rate of 3.2 percent between 2002 and 2012. In 2017 the population of the region was projected at 1,173,667 inhabitants. In 2012, 211,537 people, or 21.2 percent of the region's population lived in urban areas, an increase of 250.4 percent over the urban population of 60,377 recorded in 2002. According to the National Bureau of Statistics' (NBS) 2018 population forecasts, there were 610,981 women and 562,686 men living in Songwe Region as of the end of 2017.

== Administrative divisions ==
=== Districts ===
Songwe Region is divided into the town of Tunduma and the districts of Ileje, Mbozi, Momba and Songwe. Tunduma is subdivided into 15 wards and 71 mitaa (streets), while the four districts are subdivided into 11 divisions, 79 wards, 307 villages and 1493 hamlets.

Districts of Songwe Region as of 2016
Map	District	Population (2012 Census)
	Ileje District	124,451
	Mbozi District	446,339
	Momba District	294,380
	Songwe District	133,692
	Total	998,772

The commissioner of Songwe Region is Omary Tebweta Mgumba, who was appointed on 15 May 2021.
