= Busale =

Ward in Kyela, Mbeya, Tanzania

Busale Kata ya Busale
- Ward
- Location within Tanzania Location within Africa
- Coordinates: 9.45°S 33.72°E
- Country: Tanzania
- Region: Mbeya Region
- District: Mbeya Urban
- Ward: Busale

Population (2016)
  - Total: 10,190
- Time zone: UTC+3 (EAT)
- Postcode: 53709

Busale is a rural ward in Kyela District of the Mbeya Region of Tanzania. It is also one of the more populous wards in the district. In 2016 the Tanzania National Bureau of Statistics report there were 10,190 people in the ward, from 9,246 in 2012.

Located in the western part of Kyela District, Busale is bordered by three wards in the district: Ngana to the south and southwest, Itope to the south and southeast, and Ipande to the east. It is also bordered by Ileje District to the north and to the west.

== Villages / vitongoji ==
The ward has 5 villages and 20 vitongoji.

- Busale
  - Busale
  - Kabale
  - Kanyasi
  - Lupakano
  - Nyibuko
  - Sumbi
- Busoka
  - Busoka
  - Chivanje
  - Ngokoto
- Ikomelo
  - Busoka
  - Ikombe
  - Itembe
  - Mahenge
- Lema
  - Katyongoli
  - Kubuguru
  - Mafiga
  - Sokoni
- Masoko
  - Lwangwa
  - Mwati
  - Sanu
