= Mbeya Rural District =

District of Mbeya Region, Tanzania

Mbeya District
- District
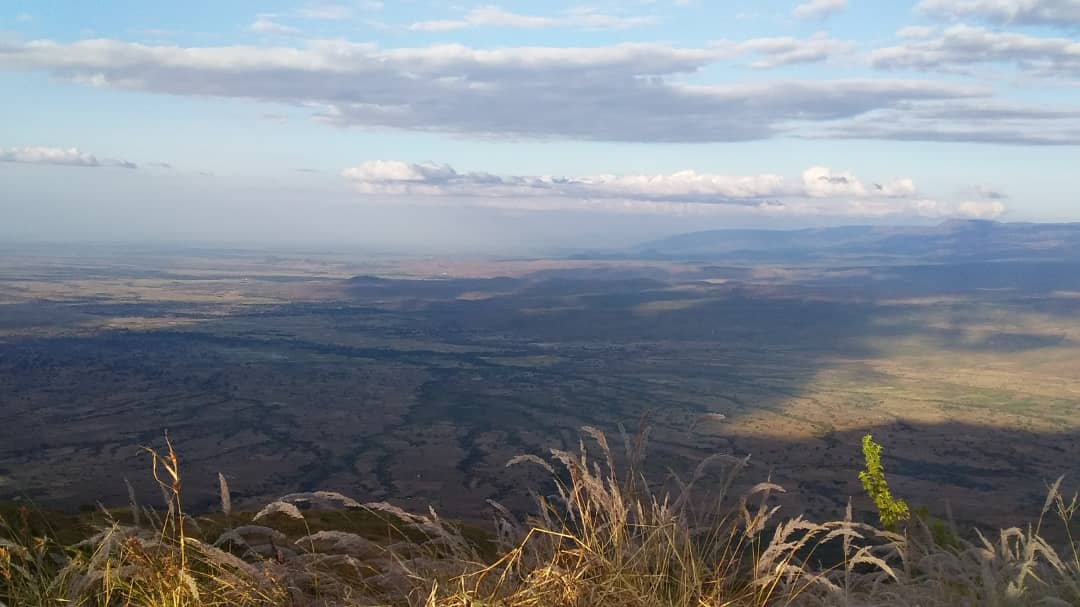
- Mbeya Tanzania

- Mbeya District of Mbeya Region
- Coordinates: 8.93245447°S 33.34162762°E
- Country: Tanzania
- Region: Mbeya Region
- District: Mbeya District

Government
  - Type: Council
  - Chairman: Mwalingo M. Kisemba
  - Director: STEPHEN E. KATEMBA

Area
  - Total: 2,813 km^{2} (1,086 sq mi)

Population (2022)
  - Total: 371,259
  - Density: 132.0/km^{2} (341.8/sq mi)
  - Religions: Christianity
- Time zone: EAT
- Postcode: 53xxx
- Area code: 025
- Website: District Website

Mbeya Rural District is one of the seven districts of Mbeya Region, Tanzania. It is bordered to the north by Mbarali District and Chunya District, to the south by Mbeya Urban District and Rungwe District, to the east by Iringa Region and to the west by Mbozi District.

In 2016 the Tanzania National Bureau of Statistics report there were 336,498 people in the district, from 305,319 in 2012.

== Administrative subdivisions ==
=== Constituencies ===
For parliamentary elections, Tanzania is divided into constituencies. As of the 2010 elections Mbeya Rural District had one constituency:

- Mbeya Vijijini Constituency

=== Wards ===
Mbeya Rural District is administratively divided into twenty-eight wards:

- Bonde la Usongwe
- Igale
- Ihango
- Ijombe
- Ikukwa
- Ilembo
- Ilungu
- Inyala
- Isuto
- Iwiji
- Iwindi
- Iyunga Mapinduzi
- Mshewe
- Santilya
- Tembela
- Ulenje
- Utengule Usongwe
- Mjele
- Shizuvi
- Izyira
- Nsalala
- Maendeleo
- Lwanjiro
- Swaya
- Itawa
- Igoma
- Itewe
- Masoko
