= Makwale =

Ward in Mbeya, Tanzania

Makwale Kata ya Makwale
- Ward
- Location within Tanzania Location within Africa
- Coordinates: 9°26′S 33°56′E
- Country: Tanzania
- Region: Mbeya Region
- District: Mbeya Urban
- Ward: Makwale

Population (2016)
  - Total: 13,946
- Time zone: UTC+3 (EAT)
- Postcode: 53714

Makwale is an administrative ward in the Kyela district of the Mbeya Region of Tanzania. In 2016 the Tanzania National Bureau of Statistics report there were 13,946 people in the ward, from 12,654 in 2012.

== Villages / vitongoji ==
The ward has 7 villages and 27 vitongoji.

- Ibale
  - Ibale
  - Kichangani
  - Maendeleo
  - Tumaini
- Kateela
  - Kateela
  - Mbugujo
  - Mwalisi
  - Mwambungula
- Mahenge
  - Ilopa
  - Isabula
  - Mahenge
- Makwale
  - Isimba
  - Makwale A
  - Makwale B
  - Mwalisi
- Mpegele
  - Katago
  - Mchangani
  - Mpegele
- Mpunguti
  - Bulyambwa
  - Katete
  - Mahanji
  - Mpunguti
- Ngeleka
  - Iponjola
  - Katago
  - Lukuju
  - Mwalingo
  - Ngeleka I
