= Ipinda =

Ward in Mbeya, Tanzania

Ipinda Kata ya Ipinda
- Ward
- Location within Tanzania Location within Africa
- Coordinates: 9°29′S 33°54′E
- Country: Tanzania
- Region: Mbeya Region
- District: Mbeya Urban
- Ward: Ipinda

Population (2016)
  - Total: 22,976
- Time zone: UTC+3 (EAT)
- Postcode: 53711

Ipinda is an administrative ward in the Kyela district of the Mbeya Region of Tanzania. In 2016 the Tanzania National Bureau of Statistics report there were 22,976 people in the ward, from 20,847 in 2012.

== Villages / vitongoji ==
The ward has 11 villages and 29 vitongoji.

- Bujela
  - Bujela
  - Lupaso
- Ikumbilo
  - Ikumbilo
  - Kalulya
- Ikulu
  - Ikulu Kanisani
  - Ikulu Kusini
- Ipinda
  - Ipinda Kaskazini
  - Ipinda Kati
  - Ipinda Kusini
- Kafundo
  - Kafundo Kaskazini
  - Kafundo Kati
  - Kafundo Kusini
- Kanga
  - Kanga A
  - Kanga B
  - Mwangulu
- Kiingili
  - Kingili A
  - Kingili B
  - Lukuju
  - Mahenge
- Kisale
  - Iringa
  - Mbangamoyo
- Lupaso
  - Kanyelele
  - Lupaso
- Mabunga
  - Mbamila
  - Mpunguti
  - Nsongola
- Ngamanga
  - Ibungu
  - Mitugutu
  - Ngamanga Kati
