= Ikama =

Ward in Mbeya, Tanzania

Ikama Kata ya Ikama
- Ward
- Location within Tanzania Location within Africa
- Coordinates: 9°16′S 33°50′E
- Country: Tanzania
- Region: Mbeya Region
- District: Mbeya Urban
- Ward: Ikama

Population (2016)
  - Total: 5,206
- Time zone: UTC+3 (EAT)
- Postcode: 53716

Ikama is an administrative ward in the Kyela district of the Mbeya Region of Tanzania. In 2016 the Tanzania National Bureau of Statistics report there were 5,206 people in the ward, from 4,724 in 2012.

== Villages / vitongoji ==
The ward has 4 villages and 16 vitongoji.

- Fubu
  - Fubu
  - Lyongo
  - Mbwato
  - Ndondobya
  - Seko
- Ilopa
  - Bugoloka
  - Ilopa
  - Kyimo
  - Ndwanga
- Mpunguti
  - Ikama
  - Mpanga
  - Mpunguti A
  - Mpunguti B
- Mwambusye
  - Busalano
  - Itiki
  - Nsela
