= Mwaya =

Ward of Mbeya Region, Tanzania

Mwaya Kata ya Mwaya
- Ward
- Location within Tanzania Location within Africa
- Coordinates: 8°55′S 36°50′E
- Country: Tanzania
- Region: Mbeya Region
- District: Mbeya Urban
- Ward: Mwaya

Population (2016)
  - Total: 12,841
- Time zone: UTC+3 (EAT)
- Postcode: 53702

Mwaya is an administrative ward in the Kyela district of the Mbeya Region of Tanzania. In 2016, the Tanzania National Bureau of Statistics report there were 12,841 people in the ward, from 11,651 in 2012.

== Villages / vitongoji ==
The ward has 10 villages and 33 vitongoji.

- Ilondo
  - Ikubo
  - Ilondo
  - Maini
- Kapamisya
  - Kabale
  - Kapamisya
  - Majengo
- Kasala
  - Kasala A
  - Kasala B
  - Kasala C
- Lugombo
  - Lubaga
  - Lugombo
  - Lupando
  - Mbaasi
  - Mota
- Lukuyu
  - Lukuyu
  - Mwanjabala
- Malungo
  - Malungo
  - Mtela
  - Serengeti
- Masebe
  - Ilembula
  - Lugoje
  - Masebe Kati
- Mwaya
  - Itajania
  - Kiputa
  - Mwaya
  - Njisi
- Ndola
  - Ipyasyo
  - Lupondo
  - Mbegele
  - Seko
- Tenende
  - Mbasi
  - Tenende Chini
  - Tenende Juu
