= Ngonga =

Ward in Kyela, Mbeya, Tanzania

Ngonga Kata ya Ngonga
- Ward
- Location within Tanzania
- Coordinates: 9.666°S 33.92°E
- Country: Tanzania
- Region: Mbeya Region
- District: Kyela
- Ward: Ngonga
- Established: 1984

Government
  - Type: Council

Area
  - Total: 339.4 km^{2} (131.0 sq mi)
- Elevation: 482 m (1,581 ft)

Population (2016)
  - Total: 9,159
  - Density: 26.99/km^{2} (69.89/sq mi)
- Time zone: EAT
- Postcode: 53706
- Area code: 025
- Website: District Website

Ngonga is an administrative ward in the Kyela district of the Mbeya Region of Tanzania. The village is on Lake Nyasa by the Songwe River that forms the Tanzania and Malawi border, and thirty minute drive from the border crossing in Kasumulu. The ward covers an area of 339.4 square kilometres (131.0 sq mi) with an average elevation of 482 metres (1,581 ft).

In 2016 reports there were 9,159 people in the ward, from 8,310 in 2012, and 7,572 in 2002. The ward has 27 inhabitants per square kilometre (70/sq mi).

== Villages / vitongoji ==
The ward has 5 villages and 26 vitongoji.

- Itenya
  - Ijumbe
  - Isuba
  - Itenya
  - Mbangala
  - Mpulo
- Itete
  - Isanga
  - Lusanga
  - Mota
  - Mpanda
- Lugombo
  - Butangali
  - Kyimbila
  - Lugombo
  - Masumba
  - Mpata
  - Ndola
- Ngonga
  - Iringa
  - Kiputa
  - Magege
  - Masoko
  - Mbande
  - Mbyasyo
  - Mota
  - Njisi
- Nsasa
  - Bujesi
  - Ndyali
  - Nsasa
