= Ikolo =

Ward in Mbeya, Tanzania

Ikolo Kata ya Ikolo
- Ward
- Location within Tanzania Location within Africa
- Coordinates: 9°39′S 33°54′E
- Country: Tanzania
- Region: Mbeya Region
- District: Mbeya Urban
- Ward: Ikolo

Population (2016)
  - Total: 5,665
- Time zone: UTC+3 (EAT)
- Postcode: 53704

Ikolo is an administrative ward in the Kyela district of the Mbeya Region of Tanzania. In 2016 the Tanzania National Bureau of Statistics report there were 5,665 people in the ward, from 5,140 in 2012.

== Villages / vitongoji ==
The ward has 3 villages and 16 vitongoji.

- Ikolo
  - Bugoloka
  - Busona
  - Ibungu
  - Lupando
  - Mbimbi
  - Mbondela
  - Ndobo
  - Nyelele
- Lupembe
  - Lugombo
  - Lupembe
- Muungano
  - Bunyongala "A"
  - Bunyongala "B"
  - Kyimo
  - Masyabala
  - Mwigo
  - Njikula
