= Lusungo =

Ward in Mbeya, Tanzania

Lusungo Kata ya Lusungo
- Ward
- Location within Tanzania Location within Africa
- Coordinates: 9°30′S 33°59′E
- Country: Tanzania
- Region: Mbeya Region
- District: Mbeya Urban
- Ward: Lusungo

Population (2016)
  - Total: 7,003
- Time zone: UTC+3 (EAT)
- Postcode: 53713

Lusungo is an administrative ward in the Kyela district of the Mbeya Region of Tanzania. In 2016 the Tanzania National Bureau of Statistics report there were 7,003 people in the ward, from 6,354 in 2012.

== Villages / vitongoji ==
The ward has 5 villages and 17 vitongoji.

- Kikuba
  - Isyeto
  - Lufumbi
  - Malangali
- Lukama
  - Igembe
  - Lukama Chini
  - Lukama Kati
- Lukwego
  - Bulimbwe
  - Kaposo
  - Lukwego
- Lusungo
  - Bugema
  - Bugogo
  - Lusungo
  - Mpulo
  - Ntundumano
  - Ntundumbaka
- Mpanda
  - Kapugi
  - Malema
