= Kambasegela =

Ward in Busokelo, Mbeya, Tanzania

Kambasegela Kata ya Kambasegela
- Ward
- Location within Tanzania
- Coordinates: 9.396°S 33.817°E
- Country: Tanzania
- Region: Mbeya Region
- District: Busokelo District
- Ward: Kambasegela

Population (2016)
  - Total: 7,006
- Time zone: UTC+3 (EAT)
- Postcode: 53525

Kambasegela is an administrative ward in the Busokelo District of the Mbeya Region of Tanzania. In 2016 the Tanzania National Bureau of Statistics report there were 7,006 people in the ward, from 12,597 in 2012.

== Villages / vitongoji ==
The ward has 3 villages and 12 vitongoji.

- Mbambo
  - Igunga
  - Ikapu
  - Isyeto
  - Mbambo Kati
- Kambasegela
  - Iponjola
  - Kanisani
  - Mpanda
  - Mwangumbe
  - Nkuju
- Katela
  - Ilopa
  - Katela
  - Mpata
