= Majengo, Mbeya =

Ward of Mbeya Region, Tanzania

Majengo Kata ya Majengo
- Ward
- Location within Tanzania
- Coordinates: 8.895°S 33.431°E
- Country: Tanzania
- Region: Mbeya Region
- District: Mbeya Urban
- Ward: Majengo

Population (2016)
  - Total: 3,652
- Time zone: UTC+3 (EAT)
- Postcode: 53110

Majengo is an administrative ward in the Mbeya Urban district of the Mbeya Region of Tanzania. In 2016 the Tanzania National Bureau of Statistics report there were 3,652 people in the ward, from 3,314 in 2012.

== Neighborhoods ==
The ward has 2 neighborhoods; Majengo Kaskazini, and Majengo Kusini.
