= Kabula =

Ward of Mbeya Region, Tanzania

Kabula Kata ya Kabula
- Ward
- Location within Tanzania Location within Africa
- Country: Tanzania
- Region: Mbeya Region
- District: Busokelo District
- Ward: Kabula

Population (2016)
  - Total: 7,225
- Time zone: UTC+3 (EAT)
- Postcode: 53523

Kabula is an administrative ward in the Busokelo District of the Mbeya Region of Tanzania. In 2016 the Tanzania National Bureau of Statistics report there were 7,225 people in the ward, from 10,271 in 2012.

== Villages / vitongoji ==
The ward has 4 villages and 15 vitongoji.

- Kitema
  - Ipyasyo
  - Lubaga
  - Lwale
  - Ngulu
- Kapyu
  - Kapyu Chini
  - Kikota
  - Mbegele
- Kanyelele
  - Kanyelele
  - Kasebe
  - Ntangasale
- Ndembo
  - Ikambak
  - Itete
  - Kagwina
  - Malambo
  - Ndembo
