= Mpombo =

Ward of Mbeya Region, Tanzania

Mpombo Kata ya Mpombo
- Ward
- Location within Tanzania
- Coordinates: 9.19°S 33.769°E
- Country: Tanzania
- Region: Mbeya Region
- District: Busokelo District
- Ward: Mpombo

Population (2016)
  - Total: 9,684
- Time zone: UTC+3 (EAT)
- Postcode: 53530

Mpombo is an administrative ward in the Busokelo District of the Mbeya Region of Tanzania. In 2016 the Tanzania National Bureau of Statistics report there were 9,684 people in the ward, from 8,787 in 2012.

== Villages / vitongoji ==
The ward has 5 villages and 19 vitongoji.

- Lusanje
  - Ipogolo
  - Ipoma
  - Itete
  - Masebe
  - Ndamba
- Kasanga
  - Igembe
  - Kalambo
  - Kasanga
  - Kyejo
- Ijoka
  - Ilundo
  - Ipoma
  - Mpafwa
  - Ngunjwa
  - Nsongola
- Lulasi
  - Itongolugulu
  - Lukata
  - Lulasi
- Bwilando
  - Bwilando
  - Ikubo
