= Mwansekwa =

Ward of Mbeya Region, Tanzania

Mwansekwa Kata ya Mwansekwa
- Ward
- Location within Tanzania
- Coordinates: 8.86°S 33.486°E
- Country: Tanzania
- Region: Mbeya Region
- District: Mbeya Urban
- Ward: Mwansekwa

Population (2016)
  - Total: 1,987
- Time zone: UTC+3 (EAT)
- Postcode: 53129

Mwansekwa is an administrative ward in the Mbeya Urban district of the Mbeya Region of Tanzania. In 2016 the Tanzania National Bureau of Statistics report there were 1,987 people in the ward, from 1,803 in 2012.

== Neighborhoods ==
The ward has 4 neighborhoods.

- Ilembo
- Luwala
- Mengo
- Mwanzumbo
