= Isuto =

Ward in Mbeya, Tanzania

Isuto Kata ya Isuto
- Ward
- Location within Tanzania
- Coordinates: 9.076°S 33.249°E
- Country: Tanzania
- Region: Mbeya Region
- District: Mbeya Rural
- Ward: Isuto

Population (2016)
  - Total: 15,383
- Time zone: UTC+3 (EAT)
- Postcode: 53210

Isuto is an administrative ward in the Mbeya Rural district of the Mbeya Region of Tanzania. In 2016 the Tanzania National Bureau of Statistics report there were 15,383 people in the ward, from 13,958 in 2012.

== Villages and hamlets ==
The ward has 8 villages, and 75 hamlets.

- Mlowo
  - Ihanda
  - Inganzo
  - Mbuga
  - Mlowo A
  - Mlowo B
  - Mlowo C
  - Nyondo
  - Samora
  - Tozi A
  - Tozi B
- Itete
  - Chombezi
  - Igagala
  - Itete A
  - Itete B
  - Itete C
  - Mwanjelwa A
  - Mwanjelwa B
  - Mwanjelwa C
  - Nsonga
- Shinzingo
  - Iwaga
  - Iwalanje
  - Masoko
  - Mjele
  - Mkuyuni
  - Mlima Nyundu
  - Mwendo
  - Ngala
  - Nsalala
  - Shelela
- Idiwili
  - Azimio
  - Idiwili A
  - Idiwili B
  - Itaga
  - Lutengano
  - Mtakuja
  - Shilungu A
  - Shilungu B
- Shisonta
  - Ileya
  - Ileya kati
  - Kaloleni
  - Matipu
  - Mkuyuni
  - Muungano
  - Mwanjelwa
  - Shisonta A
  - Shisonta B
  - Shisonta C
- Isuto
  - Igosya
  - Ihenga A
  - Ihenga B
  - Ilizya
  - Isuto A
  - Isuto B
  - Lywayo
  - Mapinduzi A
  - Mapinduzi B
  - Mporoto
  - Mtakuja
  - Njiapanda
- Shitete
  - Halungu
  - Ilanga
  - Shitete A
  - Shitete B
  - Yona A
  - Yona B
  - Yona C
- Ilindi
  - Honde
  - Igunda
  - Ilindi A
  - Ilindi B
  - Mkuyuni
  - Mlingotini
  - Sanyesya
  - Shilungu
  - Sogea Ilala
