= Lupa Ward =

Ward in Chunya, Mbeya, Tanzania

Lupa Kata ya Lupa Lupatingatinga
- Ward
- Location within Tanzania
- Coordinates: 8.024°S 33.267°E
- Country: Tanzania
- Region: Mbeya Region
- District: Chunya District
- Ward: Lupa

Population (2016)
  - Total: 8,396
- Time zone: UTC+3 (EAT)
- Postcode: 53819

Lupa is an administrative ward in the Chunya district of the Mbeya Region of Tanzania. In 2016 the Tanzania National Bureau of Statistics report there were 8,396 people in the ward, from 12,835 in 2012.

== Villages / vitongoji ==
The ward has 3 villages and 16 vitongoji.

- Lyeselo
  - Legeza Mwendo
  - Lyeselo
  - Mapambano
  - Ngonilima
  - Songambele
- Ifuma
  - Chemichemi
  - Ifuma
  - Kagera
  - Kazaroho
- Lupatingatinga
  - Forest
  - Kivukoni
  - Lupatingatinga
  - Majengo Mapya
  - Mission
  - Mtukula
  - Vitumbi
