= Itende =

Ward of Mbeya Region, Tanzania

Itende Kata ya Itende
- Ward
- Location within Tanzania Location within Africa
- Coordinates: 8°54′S 33°24′E
- Country: Tanzania
- Region: Mbeya Region
- District: Mbeya Urban
- Ward: Itende

Population (2016)
  - Total: 3,846
- Time zone: UTC+3 (EAT)
- Postcode: 53117

Itende is an administrative ward in the Mbeya Urban district of the Mbeya Region of Tanzania. In 2016 the Tanzania National Bureau of Statistics report there were 3,846 people in the ward, from 3,490 in 2012.

== Neighborhoods ==
The ward has 6 neighborhoods.

- Gombe
- Inyala
- Isonta
- Itende Kati
- Itete
- Lusungo
