= Igale =

Administrative ward in Mbeya, Tanzania

Igale Kata ya Igale
- Ward
- Location within Tanzania
- Coordinates: 9.014°S 33.421°E
- Country: Tanzania
- Region: Mbeya Region
- District: Mbeya Rural
- Ward: Igale

Population (2016)
  - Total: 11,973
- Time zone: UTC+3 (EAT)
- Postcode: 53226

Igale is an administrative ward in the Mbeya Rural district of the Mbeya Region of Tanzania. In 2016 the Tanzania National Bureau of Statistics report there were 11,973 people in the ward, from 10,864 in 2012.

== Villages and hamlets ==
The ward has 5 villages, and 40 hamlets.

- Horongo
  - Ibolelo
  - Ileya
  - Isusa
  - Kiwanjani
  - Laini
  - Lutali
  - Njombo
  - Nsongole
- Igale
  - Ihova
  - Ilindi
  - Ing'oli
  - Ipembati
  - Isonso
  - Isyesye
  - Itete
  - Iyunga
- Itaga
  - Isanzi A
  - Isanzi B
  - Ivumo
  - Izuo
  - Kiwanjani
  - Mbibi
  - Mpongota
  - Yeriko
- Izumbwe I
  - Itala
  - Kilambo
  - Kiwiga
  - Lusungo
  - Luzwiwi
  - Mlima Baruti
  - Mwashala
  - Nyula
  - Segela
  - Ujamaa
- Shongo
  - Ikeja
  - Isela
  - Kawetele
  - Matula
  - Mbushi
  - Nkuyu
