= Iyunga =

Ward in Mbeya, Tanzania

Iyunga Kata ya Iyunga
- Ward
- Location within Tanzania
- Coordinates: 8.937°S 33.411°E
- Country: Tanzania
- Region: Mbeya Region
- District: Mbeya Urban
- Ward: Iyunga

Population (2016)
  - Total: 16,560
- Time zone: UTC+3 (EAT)
- Postcode: 53119

Iyunga is an administrative ward in the Mbeya Urban district of the Mbeya Region of Tanzania. In 2016 the Tanzania National Bureau of Statistics report there were 16,560 people in the ward, from 7,377 in 2012.

== Neighborhoods ==
The ward has 5 neighborhoods.

- Igale
- Ikuti
- Inyala
- Maendeleo
- Sisintila
