= Ruanda (disambiguation) =

Rwanda or Ruanda is a country in East Africa.

Ruanda may also refer to:

- Ruanda (Mbeya Urban), a ward in Mbeya Urban District in southern Tanzania
- Ruanda (Mbozi), a ward in Mbozi District in southern Tanzania
- Ruanda (moth), a genus of moths in the subfamily Lymantriinae

== See also ==
- Luanda (disambiguation)
- Ruanda-Urundi (1916–1962), a former Belgian territory which preceded the sovereign states of Rwanda and Burundi
