= Mamba (Chunya) =

Ward of Mbeya Region, Tanzania

Mamba Kata ya Mamba
- Ward
- Location within Tanzania
- Coordinates: 8.185°S 33.175°E
- Country: Tanzania
- Region: Mbeya Region
- District: Chunya
- Ward: Mamba

Population (2016)
  - Total: 10,563
- Time zone: UTC+3 (EAT)
- Postcode: 53811

Mamba is an administrative ward in the Chunya district of the Mbeya Region of Tanzania. In 2016 the Tanzania National Bureau of Statistics report there were 10,563 people in the ward, from 15,462 in 2012.

== Villages / vitongoji ==
The ward has 3 villages and 13 vitongoji.

- Mamba
  - Kisalasi C
  - Kisalasi D
  - Mamba A
  - Mamba B
  - Mandumbwi
- Mtande
  - Ijiwa
  - Mabatini
  - Magunga
  - Mamba F
  - Mamba G
- Mapinduzi
  - Mamba E
  - Mapinduzi
  - Ngwangu
