= Inyala =

Ward in Mbeya, Tanzania

- Ward
- Location within Tanzania
- Coordinates: 8°52′S 33°38′E
- Country: Tanzania
- Region: Mbeya Region
- District: Mbeya District
- Ward: Inyala

Government
  - Type: Council

Population (2016)
  - Total: 11,621
- Time zone: UTC+3 (EAT)
- Postcode: 53202
- Area code: 025
- Website: District Website

Inyala is an administrative ward in the Mbeya Rural district of the Mbeya Region of Tanzania. In 2016 the Tanzania National Bureau of Statistics report there were 11,621 people in the ward, from 10,544 in 2012.

== Villages and hamlets ==
The ward has 7 villages, and 35 hamlets.

- Inyala
  - Hamwenje
  - Hamwenje B
  - Inyala
  - Kolya
  - Relini
  - Sisiyunje
  - Tuyombo
- Shamwengo
  - Ipogoro
  - Itondwe
  - Myela
  - Utulivu
- Imezu
  - Inzawa
  - Isanga
  - Magoye
  - Masementi
  - Masyeto
  - Sawa
- Iyawaya
  - Galiaya B
  - Galilaya
  - Kijiweni
  - Madizini
  - Vijana
- Makwenje
  - Ibohola
  - Makwenje
  - Makwenje B
  - Mlowo
  - Mlowo B
  - Syite
- Darajani
  - Darajani
  - Iduda
  - Iganjo
  - Imezu Mjini
  - Iwanga
- Mwashoma
  - Inolo
  - Mwashoma
