= Mtanila =

Ward of Mbeya Region, Tanzania

Mtanila Kata ya Mtanila
- Ward
- Location within Tanzania
- Coordinates: 7.932°S 33.316°E
- Country: Tanzania
- Region: Mbeya Region
- District: Chunya District
- Ward: Mtanila

Population (2016)
  - Total: 9,601
- Time zone: UTC+3 (EAT)
- Postcode: 53820

Mtanila is an administrative ward on the Chunya District of the Mbeya Region of Tanzania. In 2016 the Tanzania National Bureau of Statistics report there were 9,601 people in the ward, from 8,711 in 2012.

== Villages / vitongoji ==
The ward has 3 villages and 19 vitongoji.

- Mtanila
  - Igama
  - Ikokotela
  - Kawisunge
  - Manolo
  - Mapimbi
  - Mtanila C.
  - Nkena
- Igangwe
  - Igangwe
  - Lupuju
  - Masimba
  - Shauri Moyo
  - Sokoine
- Kalangali
  - Ilolo
  - Ilumwa
  - Itigi
  - Kasasya
  - Konde
  - Majengo
  - Ndola
