= Iziwa =

Ward in Mbeya, Tanzania

Iziwa Kata ya Iziwa
- Ward
- Location within Tanzania
- Coordinates: 8.868°S 33.397°E
- Country: Tanzania
- Region: Mbeya Region
- District: Mbeya Urban
- Ward: Iziwa

Population (2016)
  - Total: 3,500
- Time zone: UTC+3 (EAT)
- Postcode: 53132

Iziwa is an administrative ward in the Mbeya Urban district of the Mbeya Region of Tanzania. In 2016 the Tanzania National Bureau of Statistics report there were 3,500 people in the ward, from 3,176 in 2012.

== Neighborhoods ==
The ward has 5 neighborhoods.

- Iduda
- Ilungu
- Imbega
- Isengo
- Isumbi
