= Mafyeko =

Ward of Mbeya Region, Tanzania

Mafyeko Kata ya Mafyeko
- Ward
- Location within Tanzania
- Coordinates: 7.508°S 33.505°E
- Country: Tanzania
- Region: Mbeya Region
- District: Chunya
- Ward: Mafyeko

Population (2016)
  - Total: 10,370
- Time zone: UTC+3 (EAT)
- Postcode: 53823

Mafyeko is an administrative ward in the Chunya district of the Mbeya Region of Tanzania. In 2016 the Tanzania National Bureau of Statistics report there were 10,370 people in the ward, from 9,409 in 2012.

== Villages / vitongoji ==
The ward has 2 villages and 10 vitongoji.

- Bitimanyanga
  - Bitimanyanga A
  - Bitimanyanga B
  - Bitimanyanga C
  - Bitimanyanga D
  - Idodoma
- Mafyeko
  - Mafyeko A
  - Mafyeko B
  - Mafyeko C
  - Mafyeko D
  - Tulieni
