= Lupata =

Ward of Mbeya Region, Tanzania

Lupata Kata ya Lupata
- Ward
- Location within Tanzania Location within Africa
- Coordinates: 9°18′S 33°51′E
- Country: Tanzania
- Region: Mbeya Region
- District: Busokelo District
- Ward: Lupata

Population (2016)
  - Total: 10,018
- Time zone: UTC+3 (EAT)
- Postcode: 53524

Lupata is an administrative ward in the Busokelo District of the Mbeya Region of Tanzania. In 2016 the Tanzania National Bureau of Statistics reported there were 10,018 people in the ward.

== Villages / neighborhoods ==
The ward has 5 villages and 22 hamlets.

- Bwibuka
  - Bwibuka
  - Iponjola
  - Malema
  - Mbongolo
- Lupata
  - Igembe
  - Ipoma
  - Isuba
  - Kibonde
  - Kituli
  - Njisi
- Mpanda
  - Isumba
  - Kabula
  - Kasangali
  - Kilosi
  - Mpanda
  - Mpombo
- Ntapisi
  - Lembuka
  - Mwakipiko
  - Ntapisi Kati
- Nsonso
  - Bujesi
  - Kikulumba
  - Kikusya
