= Kalobe =

Ward in Mbeya, Tanzania

Kalobe Kata ya Kalobe
- Ward
- Location within Tanzania
- Coordinates: 8.915°S 33.414°E
- Country: Tanzania
- Region: Mbeya Region
- District: Mbeya Urban
- Ward: Kalobe

Population (2016)
  - Total: 14,526
- Time zone: UTC+3 (EAT)
- Postcode: 53118

Kalobe is an administrative ward in the Mbeya Urban district of the Mbeya Region of Tanzania. In 2016 the Tanzania National Bureau of Statistics report there were 14,526 people in the ward, from 13,180 in 2012.

== Neighborhoods ==
The ward has 6 neighborhoods.

- DDC
- Kalobe
- Maendeleo A
- Maendeleo B
- Majengo Mapya
