= Kandete =

Ward of Mbeya Region, Tanzania

Kandete Kata ya Kandete
- Ward
- Location within Tanzania Location within Africa
- Coordinates: 9°09′S 33°48′E
- Country: Tanzania
- Region: Mbeya Region
- District: Busokelo District
- Ward: Kandete

Population (2016)
  - Total: 11,334
- Time zone: UTC+3 (EAT)
- Postcode: 53532

Kandete is an administrative ward in the Busokelo District of the Mbeya Region of Tanzania. In 2016 the Tanzania National Bureau of Statistics report there were 11,334 people in the ward, from 10,284 in 2012.

== Villages / vitongoji ==
The ward has 6 villages and 22 vitongoji.

- Kandete
  - Kalulu
  - Lupanga
  - Majengo
- Ipelo
  - Ipyana
  - Kabula
  - Lugombo
  - Nsika
- Mwela
  - Kisiba
  - Lusungo
  - Mwela
  - Sokoni
- Ndala
  - Ipyela
  - Katumba
  - Kisimba
  - Masebe
  - Ntete
- Lugombo
  - Ikama
  - Itete
  - Lugombo
- Bujingijila
  - Bujingijila
  - Ihobe
  - Malambo
