= Chokaa =

Ward in Chunya, Mbeya, Tanzania

Chokaa Kata ya Chokaa
- Ward
- Location within Tanzania
- Coordinates: 8.502°S 33.402°E
- Country: Tanzania
- Region: Mbeya Region
- District: Chunya District
- Ward: Chokaa

Population (2016)
  - Total: 16,782
- Time zone: UTC+3 (EAT)
- Postcode: 53801

Chokaa is an administrative ward in the Chunya district of the Mbeya Region of Tanzania. In 2016 the Tanzania National Bureau of Statistics report there were 16,782 people in the ward, from 15,227 in 2012.

== Villages / vitongoji ==
The ward has 4 villages and 19 vitongoji.

- Mapogoro
  - Ashishila
  - Mapogoro A
  - Mapogoro B
  - Mnyolima
  - Wafugaji
- Kibaoni
  - Kibaoni A
  - Kibaoni B
  - Kibaoni C
  - Majengo
  - Sinza
- Chokaa
  - Chokaa A
  - Chokaa B
  - Legezamwendo
  - Sambilimwaya
- Godima
  - Godima
  - Ikamasi
  - Majengo
  - Mwankonyonto
  - Saitunduma
