= Itagano =

Ward of Mbeya Region, Tanzania

Itagano Kata ya Itagano
- Ward
- Location within Tanzania Location within Africa
- Coordinates: 8°51′S 33°27′E
- Country: Tanzania
- Region: Mbeya Region
- District: Mbeya Urban
- Ward: Itagano

Population (2016)
  - Total: 1,930
- Time zone: UTC+3 (EAT)
- Postcode: 53130

Itagano is an administrative ward in the Mbeya Urban district of the Mbeya Region of Tanzania. In 2016 the Tanzania National Bureau of Statistics report there were 1,930 people in the ward, from 1,751 in 2012.

== Neighborhoods ==
The ward has 2 neighborhoods Ipombo, and Itagano.
