= Kambikatoto =

Ward in Chunya, Mbeya, Tanzania

Kambikatoto Kata ya Kambikatoto
- Ward
- Location within Tanzania
- Coordinates: 7.232°S 33.497°E
- Country: Tanzania
- Region: Mbeya Region
- District: Chunya District
- Ward: Kambikatoto

Population (2016)
  - Total: 7,815
- Time zone: UTC+3 (EAT)
- Postcode: 53825

Kambikatoto is an administrative ward in the Chunya district of the Mbeya Region of Tanzania. In 2016 the Tanzania National Bureau of Statistics report there were 7,815 people in the ward, from 7,091 in 2012.

== Villages / vitongoji ==
The ward has 2 villages and 7 vitongoji.

- Kambikatoto
  - Gengeni
  - Iwolelo
  - Kibaoni
  - Laini
- Sipa
  - Majiweni
  - Mawonde
  - Mwamasesa
