= Luwalaje =

Ward in Chunya, Mbeya, Tanzania

Luwalaje Kata ya Luwalaje
- Ward
- Location within Tanzania
- Coordinates: 7.912°S 33.549°E
- Country: Tanzania
- Region: Mbeya Region
- District: Chunya District
- Ward: Luwalaje

Population (2016)
  - Total: 4,745
- Time zone: UTC+3 (EAT)
- Postcode: 53822

Luwalaje, also known as Lualaje, (Note: Luwalaje is a common name, but Lualaje is the official name used in censuses and postalcodes.) is an administrative ward in the Chunya district of the Mbeya Region of Tanzania.

In 2016 the Tanzania National Bureau of Statistics report there were 4,745 people in the ward, from 4,305 in 2012.

== Villages / vitongoji ==
The ward has 2 villages and 14 vitongoji.

- Lualaje
  - Ikingo
  - Itete
  - Kabuta
  - Kiseru
  - Kitakwa
  - Mpembe Magh.
  - Muungano
  - Sumbwe
- Mwiji
  - Isote
  - Mtakuja
  - Mwiji A
  - Mwiji B
  - Mwiji C
  - Mwiji D
