= Nonde =

Ward of Mbeya Region, Tanzania

Nonde Kata ya Nonde
- Ward
- Location within Tanzania
- Coordinates: 8.891°S 33.427°E
- Country: Tanzania
- Region: Mbeya Region
- District: Mbeya Urban
- Ward: Nonde

Population (2016)
  - Total: 2,742
- Time zone: UTC+3 (EAT)
- Postcode: 53112

Nonde is an administrative ward in the Mbeya Urban district of the Mbeya Region of Tanzania. In 2016 the Tanzania National Bureau of Statistics report there were 2,742 people in the ward, from 2,488 in 2012.

== Neighborhoods ==
The ward has 4 neighborhoods.

- Mbwile A
- Mbwile B
- Mwalingo
- Nonde
