= Ilomba (Mbeya ward) =

Ward in Mbeya, Tanzania

Ilomba Kata ya Ilomba
- Ward
- Location within Tanzania Location within Africa
- Coordinates: 8°55′17″S 33°29′49″E
- Country: Tanzania
- Region: Mbeya Region
- District: Mbeya Urban
- Ward: Ilomba

Population (2016)
  - Total: 37,495
- Time zone: UTC+3 (EAT)
- Postcode: 53121

Ilomba is an administrative ward in the Mbeya Urban district of the Mbeya Region in Tanzania. In 2016 the Tanzania National Bureau of Statistics report there were 37,495 people in the ward, from 34,021 in 2012.

Ilomba is among the best developed wards in Mbeya Urban. Socially the ward has some education centres such as public primary schools of Hayanga, Ikulu, Ivumwe, Ruanda Nzovwe and Veta. For secondary education, Ilomba (public) and Ivumwe high school (parents) are found. In vocation education Ilomba-Veta Vocation centre provides variety of technical courses. Several health centres are also found.

In infrastructure, the Tanzania-Zambia highway and Tanzania-Zambia railways pass through Ilomba ward making it among few wards in Mbeya to harbour both road and railway transportation ways. Internally, a wide distribution of aggregated and tarmac roads connects Ilomba bus station (being almost the centre of ward) with other areas such as Nane Nane Bus Terminal, Uyole and Mwanjelwa.

Economically, several trading centers such as open markets of Ilomba, Ituha Ivumwe and Mwambene are used by small entrepreneurs and traders to conduct business plus various of supermarkets.

Ilomba is rich and diverse in cultural practices due to having various tribes of Tanzania and people of different races though the typical indigenous tribes on the area are Nyakyusa and Safwa. People of different beliefs and religion inhabit the area. Among the places for worship include EAGT-Ilomba, KKKT-Sae, Moravian-Sinai Church, Pentecost Holiness Mission(PHM-Sae), Roman Catholic-Luanda and Sae Mosque.

Upon travelling and for accommodation, several Hotels and motels of Green and Peter Safar are found in the area. Ilomba Police Post is situated on Tanzania-Zambia highway only 400 meters from Ilomba bus stop.

== Neighborhoods ==
The ward has 7 neighborhoods.

- Hayanga
- Ihanga
- Ilomba
- Ituha
- Kagera
- Sae
- Tonya
