= Lwangwa =

Ward of Mbeya Region, Tanzania

Lwangwa Kata ya Lwangwa
- Ward
- Location within Tanzania Location within Africa
- Coordinates: 9°14′S 33°50′E
- Country: Tanzania
- Region: Kigoma Region
- District: Buhigwe District
- Ward: Lwangwa

Population (2016)
  - Total: 11,757
- Time zone: UTC+3 (EAT)
- Postcode: 53529

Lwangwa is an administrative ward in the Busokelo District of the Mbeya Region of Tanzania. In 2016 the Tanzania National Bureau of Statistics reported there were 11,757 people in the ward, down from 10,668 in 2012.

== Villages / neighborhoods ==
The ward has four villages and 15 hamlets.

- Mbigili
  - Bunyakasege
  - Busilya
  - Iloboko
  - Mbigili
  - Mbisa
  - Ngelenge
- Lukasi
  - Kiputa
  - Kisondela
  - Lukasi
- Kitali
  - Itiki
  - Kitali
  - Lupaso
- Ikamambande
  - Butumba
  - Kitungwa
  - Mbande
