= Ilembo =

Ward in Mbeya, Tanzania

Ilembo Kata ya Ilembo
- Ward
- Location within Tanzania
- Coordinates: 9.238°S 33.376°E
- Country: Tanzania
- Region: Mbeya Region
- District: Mbeya Rural
- Ward: Ilembo

Population (2016)
  - Total: 13,440
- Time zone: UTC+3 (EAT)
- Postcode: 53212

Ilembo is an administrative ward in the Mbeya Rural district of the Mbeya Region of Tanzania. In 2016 the Tanzania National Bureau of Statistics report there were 13,440 people in the ward, from 17,391 in 2012.

== Villages and hamlets ==
The ward has 10 villages, and 48 hamlets.

- Ilembo
  - Igwila
  - Ijembe
  - Ilembo madukani
  - Itala
  - Mafune
  - Manzigula
  - Masangati
- Dimbwe
  - Ihombe
  - Isumbi
  - Nsalala
  - Sheyo
- Mwala
  - Halonje
  - Iringa
  - Isyasya
  - Iyuli
  - Mwala Shuleni
  - Ndanga
  - Pikwi
- Mbawi
  - Igamba
  - Isela
  - Mbawi
- Mbagala
  - Itewe
  - Iwonde
  - Kesalia
  - Ujunjulu
- Iyunga
  - Iyunga "A"
  - Iyunga "B"
  - Mbozi
  - Msena
- Italazya
  - Ibula
  - Ilaga
  - Kanona
  - Lyoto
  - Mbana
- Shigamba II
  - Itale
  - Mpaza
  - Msimishe
  - Shigamba
- Mwakasita
  - Mantenga
  - Mwakasita
  - Ng'ambi
  - Shilungwe
- Shilanga
  - Igambo shuleni
  - Itigi
  - Luswaya
  - Majengo
  - Mwanda
  - Shilanga ofisini
