= Mshewe =

Ward of Mbeya Region, Tanzania

Mshewe Kata ya Mshewe
- Ward
- Location within Tanzania
- Coordinates: 8.858°S 33.276°E
- Country: Tanzania
- Region: Mbeya Region
- District: Mbeya Rural
- Ward: Mshewe

Population (2016)
  - Total: 7,278
- Time zone: UTC+3 (EAT)
- Postcode: 53216

Mshewe is an administrative ward in the Mbeya Rural district of the Mbeya Region of Tanzania. In 2016 the Tanzania National Bureau of Statistics report there were 7,278 people in the ward, from 11,241 in 2012.

== Villages and hamlets ==
The ward has 5 villages, and 40 hamlets.

- Mshewe
  - Chang'ombe
  - Chapaulenje
  - Ihanga
  - Ihanga mpakani
  - Ijombe
  - Itotowe
  - Maula
  - Mpalule
  - Mshewaje
  - Mshewe Kati
- Ilota
  - Ilota
  - Maporomoko
  - Mpona A
  - Mpona B
- Muvwa
  - Chang'ombe
  - Forest
  - Ijombe
  - Ivomo
  - Kafupa
  - Kagera
  - Lutengano
  - Mtakuja
  - Mwembeni
  - Mwembesongwa
  - Tononoka
- Njelenje
  - Ileya
  - Ilolo
  - Iwola
  - Kizota
  - Mpinza
  - Mpunguruma
  - Njela
  - Ujombe
- Mapogoro
  - Forest
  - Ibojo
  - Majengo
  - Mbuyuni
  - Mkonge
  - Nandala
  - Soweto
