= Itiji =

Ward in Mbeya, Tanzania

Itiji Kata ya Itiji
- Ward
- Location within Tanzania
- Coordinates: 8.901°S 33.432°E
- Country: Tanzania
- Region: Mbeya Region
- District: Mbeya Urban
- Ward: Itiji

Population (2016)
  - Total: 4,663
- Time zone: UTC+3 (EAT)
- Postcode: 53108

Itiji is an administrative ward in the Mbeya Urban district of the Mbeya Region of Tanzania. In 2016 the Tanzania National Bureau of Statistics report there were 4,663 people in the ward, from 4,231 in 2012.

== Neighborhoods ==
The ward has 4 neighborhoods.

- Itiji
- Makaburin
- Mbwile
- Mwasanga
