= Ghana (Mbeya ward) =

Ward in Mbeya, Tanzania

Ghana Kata ya Ghana
- Ward
- Location within Tanzania
- Coordinates: 8.888935°S 33.430557°E
- Country: Tanzania
- Region: Mbeya Region
- District: Mbeya Urban
- Ward: Ghana

Population (2016)
  - Total: 5,384
- Time zone: UTC+3 (EAT)
- Postcode: 53111

Ghana is an administrative ward in the Mbeya Urban district of the Mbeya Region of Tanzania. In 2016 the Tanzania National Bureau of Statistics report there were 5,384 people in the ward, from 4,885 in 2012.

== Neighborhoods ==
The ward has 3 neighborhoods Ghana Magharibi, Ghana Mashariki, and Mbata.
