= Ihango =

Ward in Mbeya, Tanzania

Ihango Kata ya Ihango
- Ward
- Location within Tanzania
- Coordinates: 8.083°S 36.596°E
- Country: Tanzania
- Region: Mbeya Region
- District: Mbeya Rural
- Ward: Ihango

Population (2016)
  - Total: 9,194
- Time zone: UTC+3 (EAT)
- Postcode: 53214

Ihango is an administrative ward in the Mbeya Rural district of the Mbeya Region of Tanzania. In 2016 the Tanzania National Bureau of Statistics report there were 9,194 people in the ward, from 8,342 in 2012.

== Villages and hamlets ==
The ward has 6 villages, and 49 hamlets.

- Haporoto
  - Ibomani
  - Fikeni
  - Gezaulole
  - Soweto
  - Igoma
  - Itiliwindi
  - Shihokwa
  - Mwawayo
  - Sokolo
- Idimi
  - Isanga A
  - Fatahilo
  - Uzunguni
  - Makungulu
  - Majengo
  - Inyala
  - Kijiweni
  - Kidungu
  - Isengo
  - Jangwani
- Mwabowo
  - Nonde
  - Isyagunga
  - Iyunga
  - Itigi
  - Ituta
  - Galilaya
- Impomu
  - Malagala
  - Shiwe
  - Impombombo
  - Ilambo
  - Linga
- Iwanza
  - Songambele
  - Ntangano
  - Itete
  - Ilolezya
  - Itete 'B'
- Ileya
  - Itaka
  - Itiliwindi
  - Uzunguni A
  - Uzunguni B
  - Isangati A
  - Isangati B
  - Izagati
  - Mbeye
  - Ishinda
  - Sibempe
  - Iwindi
- Ipinda
  - Ipinda
  - Simwambalafu
