= Isyesye =

Ward in Mbeya, Tanzania

Isyesye Kata ya Isyesye
- Ward
- Location within Tanzania
- Coordinates: 8.893°S 33.504°E
- Country: Tanzania
- Region: Mbeya Region
- District: Mbeya Urban
- Ward: Isyesye

Population (2016)
  - Total: 8,784
- Time zone: UTC+3 (EAT)
- Postcode: 53127

Isyesye is an administrative ward in the Mbeya Urban district of the Mbeya Region of Tanzania. In 2016 the Tanzania National Bureau of Statistics report there were 8,784 people in the ward, from 7,970 in 2012.

== Neighborhoods ==
The ward has 3 neighborhoods Mwantengule, RRM, and Vingunguti.
