= Ikukwa =

Administrative ward in Tanzania

Ikukwa Kata ya Ikukwa
- Ward
- Location within Tanzania
- Coordinates: 8.777°S 33.294°E
- Country: Tanzania
- Region: Mbeya Region
- District: Mbeya Rural
- Ward: Ikukwa

Population (2016)
  - Total: 6,639
- Time zone: UTC+3 (EAT)
- Postcode: 53215

Ikukwa is an administrative ward in the Mbeya Rural district of the Mbeya Region of Tanzania. In 2016 the Tanzania National Bureau of Statistics report there were 6,639 people in the ward, from 6,024 in 2012.

== Villages and hamlets ==
The ward has 2 villages, and 24 hamlets.

- Ikukwa
  - Ikukwa
  - Itende Kati
  - Itende juu
  - Jua kali
  - Kariakoo
  - Kiwanja
  - Mahonza
  - Mbuwi
  - Mdonya
  - Shongo
  - Ujamaa
  - Ukwaheri
  - Unguja
  - Zongo
- Simboya
  - Inyala
  - Itombi
  - Kulasini
  - Magomeni
  - Maji moto
  - Manzese
  - Ostabay
  - Shokwa
  - Simboya
  - Wanga
