= Makongolosi =

Ward of Mbeya Region, Tanzania

Makongolosi Kata ya Makongolosi
- Ward
- Location within Tanzania
- Coordinates: 8.4153°S 33.1620°E
- Country: Tanzania
- Region: Mbeya Region
- District: Chunya
- Ward: Makongolosi

Population (2016)
  - Total: 12,442
- Time zone: UTC+3 (EAT)
- Postcode: 53810

Makongolosi is an administrative ward in the Chunya district of the Mbeya Region of Tanzania. In 2016 the Tanzania National Bureau of Statistics report there were 12,442 people in the ward, from 18,116 in 2012.

== Villages / vitongoji ==
The ward has 14 vitongoji.

- Kalungu
- Kilombero
- Machinjioni
- Makongolosi
- Manyanya
- Mkuyuni
- Mpogoloni
- Mwaoga Kati
- Sokoni
- Songambele
- TRM
- Tankini
- Umoja
- Zahanati
