= Nsalaga =

Ward of Mbeya Region, Tanzania

Nsalaga Kata ya Nsalaga
- Ward
- Location within Tanzania
- Coordinates: 8.885°S 33.551°E
- Country: Tanzania
- Region: Mbeya Region
- District: Mbeya Urban
- Ward: Nsalaga

Population (2016)
  - Total: 20,933
- Time zone: UTC+3 (EAT)
- Postcode: 53133

Nsalaga is an administrative ward in the Mbeya Urban district of the Mbeya Region of Tanzania. In 2016 the Tanzania National Bureau of Statistics report there were 20,933 people in the ward, from 18,993 in 2012.

== Neighborhoods ==
The ward has 7 neighborhoods.

- Igamba
- Itezi Mashariki
- Itezi Mlimani
- Kibonde Nyasi
- Majengo mapya
- Nsalaga
- Ntundu
