= Iyela =

Ward in Mbeya, Tanzania

Iyela Kata ya Iyela
- Ward
- Location within Tanzania
- Coordinates: 8.922°S 33.462°E
- Country: Tanzania
- Region: Mbeya Region
- District: Mbeya Urban
- Ward: Iyela

Population (2016)
  - Total: 34,864
- Time zone: UTC+3 (EAT)
- Postcode: 53115

Iyela is an administrative ward in the Mbeya Urban district of the Mbeya Region of Tanzania. In 2016 the Tanzania National Bureau of Statistics report there were 34,864 people in the ward, from 31,634 in 2012.

== Neighborhoods ==
The ward has 2 neighborhoods.

- Airport
- Block T
- Ilembo
- Iyela Namba 1
- Iyela Namba 2
- Mapambano
- Nyibuko
- Pambogo
