= Kajunjumele =

Ward in Kyela, Mbeya, Tanzania

Kajunjumele Kata ya Kajunjumele
- Ward
- Location within Tanzania
- Coordinates: 9.557°S 33.943°E
- Country: Tanzania
- Region: Mbeya Region
- District: Kyela District
- Ward: Kajunjumele

Population (2016)
  - Total: 9,081
- Time zone: UTC+3 (EAT)
- Postcode: 53703

Kajunjumele is an administrative ward in the Kyela District of the Mbeya Region of Tanzania. In 2016 the Tanzania National Bureau of Statistics report there were 9,081 people in the ward, from 8,240 in 2012.

== Villages / vitongoji ==
The ward has 5 villages and 14 vitongoji.

- Buloma
  - Buloma
  - Kapugi
  - Kiwira
- Kajunjumele
  - Katyongoli
  - Lusyembe
  - Nganganyila
  - Kandete
- Kilwa
  - Lukwego
  - Mpanda
  - Njisi
- Kingila
  - Bujesi
  - Iponjola
- Lupaso
  - Lupaso
  - Malaka
