= Iwiji =

Ward in Mbeya, Tanzania

Iwiji Kata ya Iwiji
- Ward
- Location within Tanzania
- Coordinates: 9.242817°S 33.203978°E
- Country: Tanzania
- Region: Mbeya Region
- District: Mbeya Rural
- Ward: Iwiji

Population (2016)
  - Total: 9,973
- Time zone: UTC+3 (EAT)
- Postcode: 53213

Iwiji is an administrative ward in the Mbeya Rural district of the Mbeya Region of Tanzania. In 2016 the Tanzania National Bureau of Statistics report there were 9,973 people in the ward, from 15,056 in 2012.

== Villages and hamlets ==
The ward has 3 villages, and 24 hamlets.

- Iwiji
  - Iwiji
  - Mabula
  - Magole
  - Mtukula
  - Ntinga
  - Soweto
  - Vimetu
- Isende
  - Isende
  - Kalashi
  - Luhuma
  - Masala
  - Nachingwengwe
  - Shihola
  - Shinandala
- Izumbwe II
  - Chawama
  - Chilanzi
  - Hayende
  - Ikese
  - Ileya A
  - Ileya B
  - Kafule
  - Lupamba
  - Sayuma
  - Songwe
