= Ifumbo =

Ward in Chunya, Mbeya, Tanzania

Ifumbo Kata ya Ifumbo
- Ward
- Location within Tanzania
- Coordinates: 8.697°S 33.296°E
- Country: Tanzania
- Region: Mbeya Region
- District: Chunya District
- Ward: Ifumbo

Population (2016)
  - Total: 7,209
- Time zone: UTC+3 (EAT)
- Postcode: 53805

Ifumbo is an administrative ward in the Chunya district of the Mbeya Region of Tanzania. In 2016 the Tanzania National Bureau of Statistics report there were 7,209 people in the ward, from 6,541 in 2012.

== Villages / vitongoji ==
The ward has 2 villages and 10 vitongoji.

- Ifumbo
  - Chikula
  - Ihango
  - Itete
  - Majengo
  - Mbuyuni
  - Mwambagala
  - Sawa A
- Lupamarket
  - Kasanga
  - Lupamarket
  - Mabomba
