= Itezi =

Ward of Mbeya Region, Tanzania

Itezi Kata ya Itezi
- Ward
- Location within Tanzania Location within Africa
- Coordinates: 8°53′S 33°32′E
- Country: Tanzania
- Region: Mbeya Region
- District: Mbeya Urban
- Ward: Itezi

Population (2016)
  - Total: 20,329
- Time zone: UTC+3 (EAT)
- Postcode: 53128

Itezi is an administrative ward in the Mbeya Urban district of the Mbeya Region of Tanzania. In 2016 the Tanzania National Bureau of Statistics report there were 20,329 people in the ward, from 18,445 in 2012.

== Neighborhoods ==
The ward has 4 neighborhoods.

- Gombe Kaskazini
- Gombe Kusini
- Itezi Magharibi
- Mwasote
