= Isanga =

Ward in Mbeya, Tanzania

Isanga Kata ya Isanga
- Ward
- Location within Tanzania
- Coordinates: 8.895°S 33.456°E
- Country: Tanzania
- Region: Mbeya Region
- District: Mbeya Urban
- Ward: Isanga

Population (2016)
  - Total: 10,486
- Time zone: UTC+3 (EAT)
- Postcode: 53106

Isanga is an administrative ward in the Mbeya Urban district of the Mbeya Region of Tanzania. In 2016 the Tanzania National Bureau of Statistics report there were 10,486 people in the ward, from 9,591 in 2012.

== Neighborhoods ==
The ward has 7 neighborhoods.

- Igoma Ilolo A
- Igoma Ilolo B
- Ilolo
- Isanga Kati
- Mkuju
- Mmita
- Wigamba
