= Santilya =

Ward of Mbeya Region, Tanzania

- Ward
- Location within Tanzania
- Coordinates: 9°06′S 33°21′E
- Country: Tanzania
- Region: Mbeya Region
- District: Mbeya District
- Ward: Santilya

Government
  - Type: Council

Population (2016)
  - Total: 19,373
- Time zone: UTC+3 (EAT)
- Postcode: 53211
- Area code: 025
- Website: District Website

Santilya is an administrative ward in the Mbeya Rural district of the Mbeya Region of Tanzania. In 2016 the Tanzania National Bureau of Statistics report there were 19,373 people in the ward, from 17,578 in 2012.

== Villages and hamlets ==
The ward has 11 villages, and 62 hamlets.

- Santilya
  - Ibungu
  - Ivugula
  - Iyungwe
  - Izosya
  - Mantanji
  - Mtyeti
  - Soweto
- Sanje
  - Ilindi
  - Magao
  - Mantenga
  - Sanje A
  - Sanje B
  - Santwinji
  - Swaya
- Iswago
  - Hazumbi
  - Inyala A
  - Inyala B
  - Itambila
  - Lusungo
  - Nsongole
  - Ntenga
  - Ntete
  - Shikulusi
  - Sindyanga
- Mpande
  - Idunda A
  - Idunda B
  - Mpande A
  - Mpande B
- Jojo
  - Horongo
  - Ilewe A
  - Ilewe B
  - Ilomba
  - Itundu A
  - Itundu B
  - Ivugula
  - Iwale
  - Jojo
  - Mwanjelwa
- Nsheha
  - Ilembo
  - Nsheha
  - Sukamawela
- Itizi
  - Itizi "A"
  - Itizi "B"
  - Itizi "C"
- Ruanda
  - Isuwa
  - Ivimbizya A
  - Ivimbizya B
  - Ntole
  - Shipongo A
  - Shipongo B
- Mpande
  - Idunda A
  - Idunda B
  - Mpande A
  - Mpande B
- Isongole
  - Isongole A
  - Isongole B
  - Shizyangule
  - Ugaya A
  - Ugaya B
- Masyeta
  - Masyeta "A"
  - Masyeta "B"
  - Masyeta "C"
