= Kyela Mjini =

Ward in Kyela, Mbeya, Tanzania

Kyela Kata ya Kyela
- Ward
- Location within Tanzania
- Coordinates: 9.597°S 33.865°E
- Country: Tanzania
- Region: Mbeya Region
- District: Kyela District
- Ward: Kyela

Population (2016)
  - Total: 47,389
- Time zone: UTC+3 (EAT)
- Postcode: 53701

Kyela Mjini is an administrative ward and a town in the Kyela district of the Mbeya Region of Tanzania. In 2012 there were 47,389 people in the ward.
