= Isange =

Ward of Mbeya Region, Tanzania

Isange Kata ya Isange
- Ward
- Location within Tanzania Location within Africa
- Country: Tanzania
- Region: Mbeya Region
- District: Busokelo District
- Ward: Isange

Population (2016)
  - Total: 6,381
- Time zone: UTC+3 (EAT)
- Postcode: 53531

Isange is an administrative ward in the Busokelo District of the Mbeya Region of Tanzania. In 2016 the Tanzania National Bureau of Statistics report there were 6,381 people in the ward, from 5,790 in 2012.

== Villages / vitongoji ==
The ward has four villages and 22 vitongoji.

- Bumbigi
  - Iloba
  - Kititu
  - Lwangilo A
  - Lwangilo B
  - Nguka
  - Nsanga
- Isange
  - Iponjola
  - Ipyela
  - Isabula
  - Isanu
  - Lugombo
  - Mpunga
  - Ndamba
  - Sota
- Matamba
  - Ibungu
  - Ilondo
  - Lumbila
  - Matamba Chini
  - Matamba Juu
- Nkalisi
  - Ipyana
  - Kikuba
  - Nkalisi
