= Iduda =

Administrative ward in Mbeya Region, Tanzania

Iduda Kata ya Iduda
- Ward
- Location within Tanzania
- Coordinates: 8.935°S 33.523°E
- Country: Tanzania
- Region: Mbeya Region
- District: Mbeya Urban
- Ward: Iduda

Population (2016)
  - Total: 4,582
- Time zone: UTC+3 (EAT)
- Postcode: 53136

Iduda is an administrative ward in the Mbeya Urban district of the Mbeya Region of Tanzania in Africa. In 2016 the Tanzania National Bureau of Statistics report there were 4,582 people in the ward, from 4,157 in 2012.

== Neighborhoods ==
The ward has 4 neighborhoods.

- Kanda ya Chini
- Kanda ya Juu
- Kanda ya Kati
- Mwahala
