= Chalangwa =

Ward of Mbeya Region, Tanzania

Chalangwa Kata ya Chalangwa
- Ward
- Location within Tanzania
- Coordinates: 8.6388948°S 33.557139°E
- Country: Tanzania
- Region: Mbeya Region
- District: Chunya
- Ward: Chalangwa

Population (2016)
  - Total: 8,831
- Time zone: UTC+3 (EAT)
- Postcode: 53804

Chalangwa is an administrative ward in the Chunya district of the Mbeya Region of Tanzania. In 2016 the Tanzania National Bureau of Statistics report there were 8,831 people in the ward, from 8,013 in 2012.

== Villages / vitongoji ==
The ward has 3 villages and 14 vitongoji.

- Chalangwa
  - Chalangwa A
  - Chalangwa B
  - Chalangwa C
  - Chemichemi
  - Wazenga A
  - Wazenga B
- Itumba
  - Itumba
  - Kanjilinji
  - Njiapanda
  - Simbalivu
- Isewe
  - Isewe
  - Izumbi
  - Mbilwa
  - Mbinga
