= Luteba =

Ward of Mbeya Region, Tanzania

Luteba Kata ya Luteba
- Ward
- Location within Tanzania Location within Africa
- Coordinates: 9°05′S 33°48′E
- Country: Tanzania
- Region: Mbeya Region
- District: Busokelo District
- Ward: Luteba

Population (2016)
  - Total: 7,837
- Time zone: UTC+3 (EAT)
- Postcode: 53533

Luteba is an administrative ward in the Busokelo District of the Mbeya Region of Tanzania. In 2016 the Tanzania National Bureau of Statistics report there were 7,837 people in the ward.

== Villages / neighborhoods ==
The ward has 6 villages and 23 hamlets.

- Mpunguti
  - Ibwe
  - Itete
  - Kabula
  - Kamasulu
  - Mwakaleli
- Luteba
  - Kasanga
  - Majwesi
  - Ndamba
- kilasi
  - Kilasi
  - Luteba
  - Ngela
- Ipuguso
  - Ikano
  - Ipuguso
  - Kisondela
  - Lusoko
  - Nsebo
- Ikubo
  - Ibungu
  - Igembe
  - Ikubo
  - Itebe
  - Kikwego
- Isale
  - Ipyela
  - Itimbo
