= Sinde =

Sinde may refer to:

== People ==
- Ángeles González-Sinde, a Spanish scriptwriter, film director and politician

== Places ==
- Sinde (ward), an administrative ward in the Mbeya Urban district of the Mbeya Region, Tanzania
- Sinde, Portugal, a civil parish in the municipality of Tábua, Portugal
