= Mabatini =

Ward of Mbeya Region, Tanzania

Mabatini Kata ya Mabatini
- Ward
- Location within Tanzania Location within Africa
- Coordinates: 8.9103°S 33.431°E
- Country: Tanzania
- Region: Mbeya Region
- District: Mbeya Urban
- Ward: Mabatini

Population (2016)
  - Total: 8,172
- Time zone: UTC+3 (EAT)
- Postcode: 53102

Mabatini is an administrative ward in the Mbeya Urban district of the Mbeya Region of Tanzania. In 2016, the Tanzania National Bureau of Statistics reported there were 8,172 people in the ward, an increase from the 7,415 recorded in 2012.

== Neighborhoods ==
The ward has 6 neighborhoods.

- Kajigili
- Kisunga
- Mabatini
- Mianzini
- Senjele
- Simike
