= Mbalizi Road =

Ward of Mbeya Region, Tanzania

Mbalizi Road Kata ya Mbalizi Road
- Ward
- Location within Tanzania
- Coordinates: 8.901°S 33.447°E
- Country: Tanzania
- Region: Mbeya Region
- District: Mbeya Urban
- Ward: Mbalizi Road

Population (2016)
  - Total: 6,662
- Time zone: UTC+3 (EAT)
- Postcode: 53101

Mbalizi Road is an administrative ward in the Mbeya Urban district of the Mbeya Region of Tanzania. In 2016 the Tanzania National Bureau of Statistics report there were 6,662 people in the ward, from 6,045 in 2012.

== Neighborhoods ==
The ward has 4 neighborhoods.

- Kabisa
- Kisoki
- Mwasyoge
- Sabasaba
