= Iwambi =

Ward in Mbeya, Tanzania

Iwambi Kata ya Iwambi
- Ward
- Location within Tanzania
- Coordinates: 8.922°S 33.385°E
- Country: Tanzania
- Region: Mbeya Region
- District: Mbeya Urban
- Ward: Iwambi

Population (2016)
  - Total: 13,652
- Time zone: UTC+3 (EAT)
- Postcode: 53120

Iwambi is an administrative ward in the Mbeya Urban district of the Mbeya Region of Tanzania. In 2016 the Tanzania National Bureau of Statistics report there were 13,652 people in the ward, from 12,387 in 2012.

== Neighborhoods ==
The ward has 7 neighborhoods.

- Ilembo
- Ivwanga
- Kandete
- Lumbila
- Mayombo
- Ndeje
- Utulivu
