= Ilemi =

Ilemi may refer to:

- The Ilemi Triangle, sometimes called only Ilemi, an area of disputed land between Kenya and South Sudan
- The Ilemi Mbeya ward, an administrative ward in the Mbeya Urban district of the Mbeya Region in Tanzania
