= Ijombe =

Ward in Mbeya, Tanzania

Ijombe Kata ya Ijombe
- Ward
- Location within Tanzania
- Coordinates: 8.922°S 33.59°E
- Country: Tanzania
- Region: Mbeya Region
- District: Mbeya Rural
- Ward: Ijombe

Population (2016)
  - Total: 11,225
- Time zone: UTC+3 (EAT)
- Postcode: 53201

Ijombe is an administrative ward in the Mbeya Rural district of the Mbeya Region of Tanzania. In 2016 the Tanzania National Bureau of Statistics report there were 11,225 people in the ward, from 10,185 in 2012.

== Villages and hamlets ==
The ward has 6 villages, and 39 hamlets.

- Iwalanje
  - Ibowola
  - Ilembo
  - Isyema
  - Iwangwa
  - Majengo
  - Njohole
  - Sogeza
- Ifiga
  - Ijombe
  - Ilanji A
  - Ilanji B
  - Ilowe A
  - Ilowe B
  - Mafyeko
  - Mawe
  - Shilongo
- Ntangano
  - Igalama
  - Ikeka
  - Iwanda
  - Majengo
  - Nsheto A
  - Nsheto B
  - Nsongwi
- Mantanji
  - Izumbwe
  - Kijiweni
  - Mecco
  - Moshi
  - Mpakani
- Hatwelo
  - Halembo
  - Ing'anda
  - Mahambi
  - Mangoto
  - Masoko
  - Mbowe
- Nsongwi juu
  - Halanzi
  - Ilangali
  - Ilembo
  - Mwatezi
  - Simambwe
  - Soweto
