= Kisegese =

Ward in Busokelo, Mbeya, Tanzania

Kisegese Kata ya Kisegese
- Ward
- Location within Tanzania
- Coordinates: 9.4076922°S 33.8931257°E
- Country: Tanzania
- Region: Mbeya Region
- District: Busokelo District
- Ward: Kisegese

Population (2016)
  - Total: 6,074
- Time zone: UTC+3 (EAT)
- Postcode: 53526

Kisegese is an administrative ward in the Busokelo District of the Mbeya Region of Tanzania. In 2016 the Tanzania National Bureau of Statistics report there were 6,074 people in the ward, from 5,511 in 2012.

== Villages / vitongoji ==
The ward has 3 villages and 12 vitongoji.

- Kiseges
  - Kibanja
  - Kisegese
  - Lufilyo
  - Mbiningu
- Ngeleka
  - Isala
  - Mbuyu
  - Mwalisi
  - Ngeleka A
  - Ngeleka B
- Kasyabone
  - Kasyabone
  - Kiloba
  - Ndobo
