= Iganzo =

Ward in Mbeya, Tanzania

Iganzo Kata ya Iganzo
- Ward
- Location within Tanzania
- Coordinates: 8.879781°S 33.459447°E
- Country: Tanzania
- Region: Mbeya Region
- District: Mbeya Urban
- Ward: Iganzo

Population (2016)
  - Total: 15,886
- Time zone: UTC+3 (EAT)
- Postcode: 53125

Iganzo is an administrative ward in the Mbeya Urban district of the Mbeya Region of Tanzania. In 2016 the Tanzania National Bureau of Statistics report there were 15,886 people in the ward, from 14,414 in 2012.

== Neighborhoods ==
The ward has 4 neighborhoods.

- Iganzo
- Igodima
- Mwambenja
- Nkuyu
