= Iyunga Mapinduzi =

Ward in Mbeya, Tanzania

Iyunga Mapinduzi Kata ya Iyunga Mapinduzi
- Ward
- Location within Tanzania
- Coordinates: 9.067°S 33.381°E
- Country: Tanzania
- Region: Mbeya Region
- District: Mbeya Rural
- Ward: Iyunga Mapinduzi

Population (2016)
  - Total: 8,130
- Time zone: UTC+3 (EAT)
- Postcode: 53206

Iyunga Mapinduzi is an administrative ward in the Mbeya Rural district of the Mbeya Region of Tanzania. In 2016 the Tanzania National Bureau of Statistics report there were 8,130 people in the ward, from 7,377 in 2012.

== Villages and hamlets ==
The ward has 5 villages, and 36 hamlets.

- Isangati
  - Isangati A
  - Isangati B
  - Isangati C
  - Izuo B
  - Izuo C
  - Izuo Izuo A
  - Mpenye
  - Ndyeki
  - Ntumba
- Igowe
  - Igowe
  - Isonganya
  - Lusungo
- Iyunga Mapinduzi
  - Iyunga A
  - Iyunga B
  - Matenga
  - Mpande A
  - Mpande B
  - Mwasanga A
  - Mwasanga B
  - Ntyanya
- Shuwa
  - Igagu
  - Ilanga A
  - Ilanga B
  - Ilanga C
  - Isonso
  - Lupembe
  - Nsangano
  - Shuwa A
  - Shuwa B
  - Shuwa C
- Madugu
  - Madugu "A"
  - Madugu "B"
  - Shiwele "A"
  - Shiwele "B"
  - Zola "A"
  - Zola "B"
