= Mwakibete =

Ward of Mbeya Region, Tanzania

Mwakibete Kata ya Mwakibete
- Ward
- Location within Tanzania Location within Africa
- Coordinates: 8°56′S 33°29′E
- Country: Tanzania
- Region: Mbeya Region
- District: Mbeya Urban
- Ward: Mwakibete

Population (2016)
  - Total: 25,700
- Time zone: UTC+3 (EAT)
- Postcode: 53122

Mwakibete is an administrative ward in the Mbeya Urban district of the Mbeya Region of Tanzania. In 2016 the Tanzania National Bureau of Statistics report there were 25,700 people in the ward, from 23,319 in 2012.

== Neighborhoods ==
The ward has 7 neighborhoods.

- Bomba mbili
- Itongo
- Ivumwe
- Ng'osi
- Nyibuko
- Shewa
- Viwandani
