= Matwiga =

Ward of Mbeya Region, Tanzania

Matwiga Kata ya Matwiga
- Ward
- Location within Tanzania
- Coordinates: 7.767°S 33.264°E
- Country: Tanzania
- Region: Mbeya Region
- District: Chunya
- Ward: Matwiga

Population (2016)
  - Total: 9,852
- Time zone: UTC+3 (EAT)
- Postcode: 53821

Matwiga is an administrative ward in the Chunya district of the Mbeya Region of Tanzania. In 2016 the Tanzania National Bureau of Statistics report there were 9,852 people in the ward, from 8,939 in 2012.

== Villages / vitongoji ==
The ward has 3 villages and 15 vitongoji.

- Matwiga
  - Ilindi
  - Konde
  - Maendeleo
  - Majengo
  - Mlimani.
  - Moyo
  - Tankini
- Mazimbo
  - Kiyombo
  - Mavinge
  - Mazimbo
- Isangawana
  - Igomaa
  - Isangawana A
  - Isangawana B
  - Mkange
  - Mpakani
