= Sisimba =

Administrative ward in Mbeya, Tanzania

Sisimba Kata ya Sisimba
- Ward
- Location within Tanzania
- Coordinates: 8.891°S 33.443°E
- Country: Tanzania
- Region: Mbeya Region
- District: Mbeya Urban
- Ward: Sisimba

Population (2016)
  - Total: 4,532
- Time zone: UTC+3 (EAT)
- Postcode: 53107

Sisimba is an administrative ward in the Mbeya Urban district of the Mbeya Region of Tanzania. In 2016 the Tanzania National Bureau of Statistics report there were 4,532 people in the ward, from 4,112 in 2012.

The Sokoine Stadium is located within the Sisimba ward.

== Neighborhoods ==
The ward has 6 neighborhoods.

- Jakaranda A
- Jakaranda B
- Soko Kuu
- TANESCO
- Uzunguni A
- Uzunguni B
