= Nsoho =

Ward of Mbeya Region, Tanzania

Nsoho Kata ya Nsoho
- Ward
- Location within Tanzania
- Coordinates: 8.88°S 33.424°E
- Country: Tanzania
- Region: Mbeya Region
- District: Mbeya Urban
- Ward: Nsoho

Population (2016)
  - Total: 2,005
- Time zone: UTC+3 (EAT)
- Postcode: 53131

Nsoho is an administrative ward in the Mbeya Urban district of the Mbeya Region of Tanzania. In 2016 the Tanzania National Bureau of Statistics report there were 2,005 people in the ward, from 1,819 in 2012.

== Neighborhoods ==
The ward has 4 neighborhoods.

- Idunda
- Kilabuni
- Mbeya Peak
- Nsoho
