= Ilungu =

Ward in Mbeya, Tanzania

Ilungu Kata ya Ilungu
- Ward
- Location within Tanzania
- Coordinates: 7.512630°S 33.446609°E
- Country: Tanzania
- Region: Mbeya Region
- District: Mbeya Rural
- Ward: Ilungu

Population (2016)
  - Total: 13,330
- Time zone: UTC+3 (EAT)
- Postcode: 53205

Ilungu is an administrative ward in the Mbeya Rural district of the Mbeya Region of Tanzania. In 2016 the Tanzania National Bureau of Statistics report there were 13,330 people in the ward, from 12,095 in 2012.

== Villages and hamlets ==
The ward has 7 villages, and 52 hamlets.

- Kikondo
  - CCM
  - Dodoma
  - Mjimwema
  - Mpakani
  - Ndwila
  - Pambamoto
- Shango
  - Chamasengo
  - Ilangali
  - Itiwa
  - Mjimwema
  - Mnyinga
  - Shango
- Nyalwela
  - Ikuha
  - Isanga
  - Isyonje A
  - Isyonje B
  - Itete
  - Katumba
  - Kumbulu
  - Loleza
  - Mwanjembe
  - Nyalwela
- Ngole
  - Igalama
  - Mabande
  - Muungano
  - Mwambanga
  - Ngole chini
  - Ngole juu
  - Nzumba A
  - Nzumba B
- Mwela
  - Idumbwe
  - Isongole
  - Kamficheni
  - Kilimani
  - Kitulo
  - Nsengo
- Ifupa
  - Ifupa A
  - Ifupa B
  - Loleza A
  - Loleza B
  - Loleza kati
  - Maendeleo
  - Majenje
  - Matwitwi
  - Ngwenyu
  - Voya
- Mashese
  - Ileje
  - Isanga
  - Magombati
  - Makunguru
  - Mashese kati
  - Mji mwema
