= Maanga =

Ward in Mbeya, Tanzania

Maanga Kata ya Maanga
- Ward
- Location within Tanzania
- Coordinates: 8.907°S 33.457°E
- Country: Tanzania
- Region: Mbeya Region
- District: Mbeya Urban
- Ward: Maanga

Population (2016)
  - Total: 7,584
- Time zone: UTC+3 (EAT)
- Postcode: 53104

Maanga is an administrative ward in the Mbeya Urban district of the Mbeya Region of Tanzania.

In 2016 the Tanzania National Bureau of Statistics report there were 7,584 people in the ward, from 6,881 in 2012.

== Neighborhoods ==
The ward has 7 neighborhoods.

- Maanga A
- Maanga B
- Maendeleo
- Mafiat
- Mwamfupe
- Ndongole
- Sinde
