= Mwansanga =

Ward of Mbeya Region, Tanzania

Mwansanga Kata ya Mwansanga
- Ward
- Location within Tanzania Location within Africa
- Coordinates: 8°46′S 33°32′E
- Country: Tanzania
- Region: Mbeya Region
- District: Mbeya Urban
- Ward: Mwansanga

Population (2016)
  - Total: 1,042
- Time zone: UTC+3 (EAT)
- Postcode: 53124

Mwansanga, also known as Mwasanga, (Note: Official documents, such as censuses, use the name Mwasanga) is an administrative ward in the Mbeya Urban district of the Mbeya Region of Tanzania. In 2016 the Tanzania National Bureau of Statistics report there were 1,042 people in the ward, from 945 in 2012.

== Neighborhoods ==
The ward has 2 neighborhoods; Nduguya, and Isoso.
