= Utengule Usongwe =

Ward of Mbeya Region, Tanzania

Utengule Usongwe Kata ya Utengule Usongwe
- Ward
- Location within Tanzania
- Coordinates: 8.891°S 33.321°E
- Country: Tanzania
- Region: Mbeya Region
- District: Mbeya Rural
- Ward: Utengule Usongwe

Population (2016)
  - Total: 46,236
- Time zone: UTC+3 (EAT)
- Postcode: 53208

Utengule Usongwe is an administrative ward in the Mbeya Rural district of the Mbeya Region of Tanzania. In 2016 the Tanzania National Bureau of Statistics report there were 46,236 people in the ward, from 41,952 in 2012.

== Villages and hamlets ==
The ward has 5 villages, and 38 hamlets.

- Magulula
  - Ilonjelo
  - Lena - Mtakuja
  - Mfinga
  - Muungano
  - Nengelesa
  - Ujora
- Mpolo
  - Ihanga 'A'
  - Ihanga 'B'
  - Ihanga 'C'
  - Mahango 'A
  - Mahango 'B'
  - Mahango 'C'
- Muungano
  - Ijumbi
  - Itambo Mpolo
  - Kajunjumele
  - Lyanumbusi
  - Mahango Mswiswi
  - Majojolo
  - Marawatu
  - Misufini
  - Senganinjala
  - Shuleni
  - Ugandilwa
- Simike
  - Mapula 'A'
  - Mapula 'B'
  - Mapululu
  - Miambeni
  - Mianzini
  - Shuleni
  - Tengatenga
  - Wambilo
- Utengule Usangu
  - Iduya A
  - Iduya B
  - Jemedari
  - Ubajulie - Mbela
  - Ujola
  - Ulyankha
  - Wimbwa
