= Iwindi =

Ward in Mbeya, Tanzania

Iwindi Kata ya Iwindi
- Ward
- Location within Tanzania
- Coordinates: 8.986°S 33.349°E
- Country: Tanzania
- Region: Mbeya Region
- District: Mbeya Rural
- Ward: Iwindi

Population (2016)
  - Total: 20,276
- Time zone: UTC+3 (EAT)
- Postcode: 53207

Iwindi is an administrative ward in the Mbeya Rural district of the Mbeya Region of Tanzania. In 2016 the Tanzania National Bureau of Statistics report there were 20,276 people in the ward, from 18,397 in 2012.

== Villages and hamlets ==
The ward has 10 villages, and 57 hamlets.

- Iwindi
  - Igawilo
  - Ihobha
  - Ijombe
  - Ipipa
  - Isanga
  - Iwindi
  - Nshala
  - Usahandeshe
- Igonyamu
  - Gezatulolane
  - Igonyamu
  - Lyanda mpalala
  - Mazoha
  - Nsalafu
  - Nsega
  - Sahandeshe
- Inolo
  - Iduji
  - Inolo
  - Kasalia
- Isangala
  - Igagu
  - Igosa
  - Isangala kati
  - Iwe
  - Madindika
  - Mande
  - Nzinga
- Itimu
  - Igombe
  - Itimu
  - Msituni
  - Mwambale
  - Mwansita
  - Njiapanda
- Maganjo
  - Barabarani
  - Maganjo
  - Makatani
  - Mbilwa
  - Mjimwema
  - Mlimani
- Mwampalala
  - Iwuzi
  - Lusungo
  - Majengo
  - Masebe
  - Mwambale
  - Nsenga
  - Sibudwa
- Mwaselela
  - Isanga B
  - Iwanga
  - Mwaselela
  - Shizi
  - Tazama
- Mwashiwawala
  - 2Mina
  - Lusungo
  - Mwashiwawala
  - Nsongole
  - Relini
- Nsambya
  - Ilindi A
  - Ilindi B
  - Nsambya
