= Iganjo =

Ward in Mbeya, Tanzania

Iganjo Kata ya Iganjo
- Ward
- Location within Tanzania
- Coordinates: 8.916850°S 33.566846°E
- Country: Tanzania
- Region: Mbeya Region
- District: Mbeya Urban
- Ward: Iganjo

Population (2016)
  - Total: 9,585
- Time zone: UTC+3 (EAT)
- Postcode: 53135

Iganjo is an administrative ward in the Mbeya Urban district of the Mbeya Region of Tanzania. In 2016 the Tanzania National Bureau of Statistics report there were 9,585 people in the ward, from 8,697 in 2012.

== Neighborhoods ==
The ward has 6 neighborhoods.

- Ikhanga
- Ilowe
- Ishinga
- Itanji
- Mtakuja
- Mwanyanje
