= Mbugani =

Ward of Mbeya Region, Tanzania

Mbugani Kata ya Mbugani
- Ward
- Location within Tanzania
- Coordinates: 5.007°S 32.79°E
- Country: Tanzania
- Region: Mbeya Region
- District: Chunya
- Ward: Mbugani

Population (2016)
  - Total: 9,626
- Time zone: UTC+3 (EAT)
- Postcode: 53724

Mbugani is an administrative ward in the Chunya district of the Mbeya Region of Tanzania. In 2016 the Tanzania National Bureau of Statistics report there were 9,626 people in the ward, from 8,734 in 2012.

== Vitongoji ==
The ward has 3 vitongoji.

- Butiama
- Mbugani
- Roma
