= Bujonde =

Ward in Kyela, Mbeya, Tanzania

Bujonde Kata ya Bujonde
- Ward
- Location within Tanzania
- Coordinates: 9.612°S 33.917°E
- Country: Tanzania
- Region: Mbeya Region
- District: Kyela
- Ward: Bujonde

Population (2016)
  - Total: 8,297
- Time zone: UTC+3 (EAT)
- Postcode: 53705

Bujonde is an administrative ward in the Kyela district of the Mbeya Region of Tanzania. In 2016 the Tanzania National Bureau of Statistics report there were 8,297 people in the ward, from 7,528 in 2012.

== Villages / vitongoji ==
The ward has 4 villages and 18 vitongoji.

- Isanga
  - Bugoloka
  - Lupaso
  - Mpanda
  - Mpulo
  - Mpunguti
- Itope
  - Busale
  - Itope
  - Ndobo
  - Ngamanga
- Lubaga
  - Chikuba
  - Ikumbo
  - Mbangamoyo
  - Mbyasyo
  - Mpanda
- Nnyelele
  - Kilombero
  - Kyimbila
  - Mahenge
  - Ndola
