= Forest (Mbeya ward) =

Ward in Mbeya, Tanzania

Forest Kata ya Forest
- Ward
- Location within Tanzania Location within Africa
- Coordinates: 8.908°S 33.448°E
- Country: Tanzania
- Region: Mbeya Region
- District: Mbeya Urban
- Ward: Forest

Population (2016)
  - Total: 7,328
- Time zone: UTC+3 (EAT)
- Postcode: 53103

Kata ya Foresti (English: Forest Ward) is an administrative ward in the Mbeya Urban district of the Mbeya Region of Tanzania. In 2016 the Tanzania National Bureau of Statistics report there were 7,328 people in the ward, from 6,649 in 2012.

== Neighborhoods ==
The ward has 7 neighborhoods.

- Benki Kuu
- Forest Mpya
- Kadege
- Maghorofani
- Makanisani
- Meta
- Muungano
