= Bonde la Usongwe =

Ward in Mbeya, Tanzania

- Ward
- Location within Tanzania
- Coordinates: 8.909573°S 33.45176°E
- Country: Tanzania
- Region: Mbeya Region
- District: Mbeya Rural
- Ward: Bonde la Usongwe
- Established: 1984

Government
  - Type: Council

Area
  - Total: 103.1 km^{2} (39.8 sq mi)
- Elevation: 1,431 m (4,695 ft)

Population (2016)
  - Total: 20,375
  - Density: 197.6/km^{2} (511.8/sq mi)
- Time zone: EAT
- Postcode: 53209
- Area code: 025
- Website: District Website

Bonde la Usongwe, is a administrative ward in Mbeya Rural in the Mbeya Region of Tanzania. The ward covers an area of 103.1 square kilometres (39.8 sq mi) with an average elevation of 1,431 metres (4,695 ft).

In 2016 reports there were 20,375 people in the ward, from 18,487 in 2012, and 16,408 in 2002. The ward has 200 inhabitants per square kilometre (520/sq mi).

== Villages and hamlets ==
The ward has 6 villages, and 54 hamlets.

- Idiga
  - Kasale
  - Majengo
  - Mbale
  - Miembeni
  - Nansabila
  - Nsungwe
  - Sigodimwa
  - Tazara
- Ikumbi
  - Ifisi
  - Igawilo
  - Ivumu
  - Malangali
  - Mbale
  - Mfindi
  - Mgowela
- Lusungo
  - Indolo
  - Kinondoni
  - Lusungo
  - Manyala
  - Nguvu kazi
  - Nsanyila
  - Sokoni
- Malowe
  - Ilama
  - Intake
  - Isenga
  - Iwejele
  - Majengo
  - Malowe Kati
  - Masoko
  - Shifingo
  - Ujunjulu A
  - Ujunjulu B
- Songwe
  - Igalula
  - Ileya
  - Kilosa
  - Maendeleo
  - Makondeko
  - Maporomoko
  - Muungano
  - Nteti
  - Tagabana
  - Zahanati
- Songwe Viwandani
  - Darajani
  - Estate
  - Ijungu
  - Iwejele
  - Kakuti
  - Kaloleni
  - Kanisani
  - Lugano
  - Mkola
  - Nsungwe
  - Sokoni
  - Tambuka reli
