= Tembela =

Ward of Mbeya Region, Tanzania

Tembela Kata ya Tembela
- Ward
- Location within Tanzania
- Coordinates: 8.941°S 33.488°E
- Country: Tanzania
- Region: Mbeya Region
- District: Mbeya Urban
- Ward: Tembela

Population (2016)
  - Total: 2,572
- Time zone: UTC+3 (EAT)
- Postcode: 53123

Tembela is an administrative ward in the Mbeya Urban district of the Mbeya Region of Tanzania. In 2016 the Tanzania National Bureau of Statistics report there were 2,572 people in the ward, from 2,334 in 2012.

The TAZARA Railway run through the northern part of the ward.

== Neighborhoods ==
The ward has 2 neighborhoods; Reli, and Tembela.
