= Chunya District =

District of Mbeya Region, Tanzania

Coordinates: 8°32′S 33°25′E

Chunya
- District
- Chunya District of Mbeya Region
- Country: Tanzania
- Region: Mbeya Region

Area
  - Total: 17,505 km^{2} (6,759 sq mi)

Population (2022 Census)
  - Total: 344,471
  - Density: 19.678/km^{2} (50.967/sq mi)
  - Religions: Christianity

Chunya District is one of the seven districts of Mbeya Region, Tanzania. It is bordered to the north by Tabora Region, to the northeast by Singida Region, to the east by Mbarali District, to the south by Mbeya Rural District, and to the west by Songwe District.

According to the 2022 Tanzania National Census, the population of Chunya District was 344,471.

In 2006, the District Commissioner of Chunya District was Frank Uhahula.

In 2015, Songwe District was split from the western part of Chunya District and integrated into the newly created Songwe Region.

== Administrative subdivisions ==
=== Constituencies ===
For parliamentary elections, Tanzania is divided into constituencies. As of the 2010 elections Chunya District had two constituencies:

- Lupa Constituency
- Songwe Constituency

Songwe Constituency is now contained within Songwe District.

As for now Chunya District has two divisions which are Kiwanja Division and Lupa Division.

=== Wards ===
Chunya District is administratively divided into twenty wards:

- Bwawani (7,524)
- Chalangwa (8,831)
- Chokaa (16,782)
- Ifumbo (7,209)
- Itewe (6,465)
- Kambikatoto (7,815)
- Kasanga (2,728)
- Lualaje (4,745)
- Lupa (8,396)
- Mafyeko (10,370)
- Makongolosi (12,442)
- Mamba (10,563)
- Matundasi (10,445)
- Matwiga (9,852)
- Mbugani (9,626)
- Mkola (6,407)
- Mtanila (9,601)
- Nkung'ungu (5,750)
- Sangambi (10,770)
- Upendo (6,478)
