= Ngana =

Ward of Mbeya Region, Tanzania

Ngana Kata ya Ngana
- Ward
- Location within Tanzania
- Coordinates: 9.564°S 33.732°E
- Country: Tanzania
- Region: Mbeya Region
- District: Kyela District
- Ward: Ngana

Population (2016)
  - Total: 8,755
- Time zone: UTC+3 (EAT)
- Postcode: 53708

Ngana is an administrative ward in the Kyela District of the Mbeya Region of Tanzania. In 2016 the Tanzania National Bureau of Statistics report there were 8,755 people in the ward, from 7,944 in 2012.

== Villages / vitongoji ==
The ward has 4 villages and 22 vitongoji.

- Kasumulu
  - Ilondo
  - Jua Kali
  - Kasumulu
  - Kasumulu Kati
  - Ngumbulu
- Mwalisi
  - Bujesi
  - Itope
  - Kani
  - Lusungo
  - Makeje
  - Ngonga
- Ngana
  - Kandete
  - Majengo
  - Malola
  - Mbwata
  - Mwega
  - Nduka
- Ushirika
  - Ibwengubati
  - Kasyunguti
  - Lusungo
  - Makasu
  - Mpalakata
