= Busokelo District =

District in Mbeya, Tanzania

Busokelo Wilaya ya Busokelo
- District
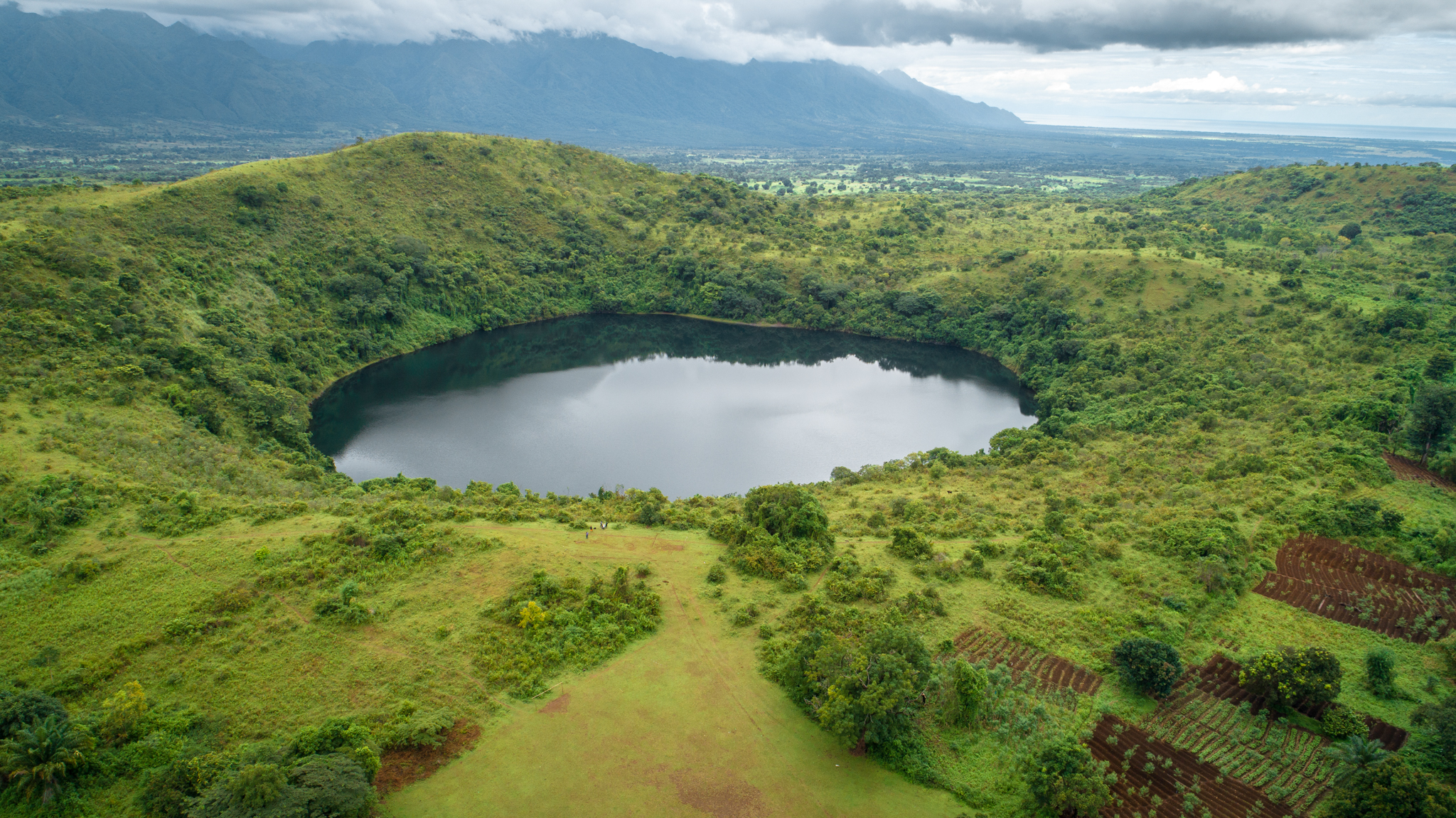
- Kiungululu Crater Lake

- Busokelo District of Mbeya Region
- Coordinates: 9.253593°S 33.6441848°E
- Country: Tanzania
- Region: Mbeya Region
- District: Itete
- Established: 2013
- Headquarters: Lwangwa Town

Government
  - Type: Council
  - Chairman: Anyosisye M. Njobelo
  - District CEO: Loema Isaay Peter

Area
  - Total: 969.14 km^{2} (374.19 sq mi)
- Elevation: 1,106 m (3,629 ft)

Population (2016)
  - Total: 106,187
  - Density: 109.57/km^{2} (283.78/sq mi)
  - Religions: Christianity
- Time zone: EAT
- Postcode: 53xxx
- Area code: 025
- Website: District Website

Busokelo is a new district in 2013 from Rungwe District within the Mbeya Region of Tanzania.

In 2016 the Tanzania National Bureau of Statistics reported there were 106,187 people in the district, down from 96,348 in 2012.

== Administrative subdivisions ==
The district has 13 wards, 56 villages and 237 suburbs.

=== Wards ===
Wards assigned to Busokelo District in 2016.

- Isange
- Itete
- Kabula
- Kambasegela
- Kandete
- Kisegese
- Luteba
- Lupata
- Lufilyo
- Lwangwa
- Mpata
- Mpombo
- Ntaba
