= Luanda (disambiguation) =

Luanda is the capital and largest city of Angola.

Luanda may also refer to:

- Luanda, Kenya, a town
- Luanda Constituency, an electoral district in Kenya
- Luan Da (died 112 BC), mystic of the Han Dynasty
- Ilha de Luanda, an island in Angola
- Luanda Lozano (born 1973), Angolan and Dominican printmaker, visual artist

== See also ==
- Loanda (disambiguation)
- Ruanda (disambiguation)
