= Itewe =

Ward in Chunya, Mbeya, Tanzania

Itewe Kata ya Itewe
- Ward
- Location within Tanzania
- Coordinates: 8.892°S 33.605°E
- Country: Tanzania
- Region: Mbeya Region
- District: Chunya District
- Ward: Itewe

Population (2016)
  - Total: 6,465
- Time zone: UTC+3 (EAT)
- Postcode: 53218

Itewe is an administrative ward in the Chunya District of the Mbeya Region of Tanzania. In 2016 the Tanzania National Bureau of Statistics report there were 6,465 people in the ward, from 8,341 in 2012.

== Villages / vitongoji ==
The ward has 5 villages and 21 vitongoji.

- Itewe
  - Barabarani
  - Igalako
  - Ikulu
  - Maendeleo
  - Msimbazi
  - Mtaa No. 8
  - Mwambalizi
  - Sawa
- Tembela
  - Tembela A
  - Tembela B
- Iyelanyala
  - Jericho
  - Lutundu
- Idunda
  - Mapinduzi A
  - Mapinduzi B
  - Mapinduzi C
  - Mapinduzi D
- Isongwa
  - Isongwa A
  - Isongwa B
  - Isongwa C
  - Isongwa D
  - Isongwa E
