= Ipande =

Ward in Kyela, Mbeya, Tanzania

Ipande Kata ya Ipande
- Ward
- Location within Tanzania
- Coordinates: 9.484°S 33.879°E
- Country: Tanzania
- Region: Mbeya Region
- District: Kyela district
- Ward: Ipande

Population (2016)
  - Total: 5,626
- Time zone: UTC+3 (EAT)
- Postcode: 53710

Ipande is an administrative ward in the Kyela district of the Mbeya Region of Tanzania. In 2016 the Tanzania National Bureau of Statistics report there were 5,626 people in the ward, from 8,081 in 2012.

== Villages / vitongoji ==
The ward has 4 villages and 9 vitongoji.

- Konjula
  - Kipela
  - Njugilo
- Maendeleo
  - Kikole "A"
  - Kikole "B"
- Mbula
  - Bugoba
  - Ilindi
- Njugilo
  - Kasama A
  - Kasama B
  - Malangali
