= Ruanda (Mbeya Urban) =

Ward in Mbeya, Tanzania

Ruanda Kata ya Ruanda
- Ward
- Location within Tanzania Location within Africa
- Coordinates: 8°53′24″S 33°25′48″E
- Country: Tanzania
- Region: Mbeya Region
- District: Mbeya Urban
- Ward: Ruanda

Population (2016)
  - Total: 24,166
- Time zone: UTC+3 (EAT)
- Postcode: 53114

Ruanda is an administrative ward in the Mbeya Urban district of the Mbeya Region of Tanzania. In 2016 the Tanzania National Bureau of Statistics report there were 24,166 people in the ward, from 21,927 in 2012.

== Neighborhoods ==
The ward has 11 neighborhoods.

- Benki
- Ilolo
- Kabwe
- Kati
- Makunguru
- Mkombozi
- Mtoni
- Mwenge
- Soko
- Soweto
- Wakulima
