= Sinde (Mbeya) =

Ward of Mbeya Region, Tanzania

Sinde Kata ya Sinde
- Ward
- Location within Tanzania
- Coordinates: 8.902°S 33.453°E
- Country: Tanzania
- Region: Mbeya Region
- District: Mbeya Urban
- Ward: Sinde

Population (2016)
  - Total: 7,730
- Time zone: UTC+3 (EAT)
- Postcode: 53105

Sinde (ward) is an administrative ward in the Mbeya Urban district of the Mbeya Region of Tanzania. In 2016 the Tanzania National Bureau of Statistics report there were 7,730 people in the ward, from 7,014 in 2012.

== Neighborhoods ==
The ward has 4 neighborhoods.

- Ilolo Kati
- Janibichi
- Kagwina
- Sinde A
