= Katumba Songwe =

Ward in Kyela, Mbeya, Tanzania

Katumba Songwe Kata ya Katumba Songwe
- Ward
- Location within Tanzania
- Coordinates: 9.695°S 33.923°E
- Country: Tanzania
- Region: Mbeya Region
- District: Kyela District
- Ward: Katumba Songwe

Population (2016)
  - Total: 8,615
- Time zone: UTC+3 (EAT)
- Postcode: 53707

Katumba Songwe, also Katumbasongwe, is an administrative ward in the Kyela District of the Mbeya Region of Tanzania. In 2016 the Tanzania National Bureau of Statistics report there were 8,615 people in the ward, from 13,895 in 2012.

== Villages / vitongoji ==
The ward has 5 villages and 20 vitongoji.

- Isaki
  - Isaki I
  - Isaki II
- Katumba
  - Ilopa
  - Katumba
  - Masoko I
  - Masoko II
  - Mbugujo
- Kabanga
  - Kabanga
  - Lusungo
  - Tenende
- Mpunguti
  - Itekenya "A"
  - Itekenya "B"
  - Lamya
  - Mpunguti A
  - Mpunguti B
- Ndwanga
  - Katumbati
  - Ndanganyika
  - Ndwanga "A"
  - Ndwanga "B"
  - Usalama
