= Ilemi (Mbeya ward) =

Ward in Mbeya, Tanzania

Ilemi Kata ya Ilemi
- Ward
- Location within Tanzania
- Coordinates: 8.893°S 33.479°E
- Country: Tanzania
- Region: Mbeya Region
- District: Mbeya Urban
- Ward: Ilemi

Population (2016)
  - Total: 29,582
- Time zone: UTC+3 (EAT)
- Postcode: 53113

Ilemi is an administrative ward in the Mbeya Urban district of the Mbeya Region of Tanzania. In 2016 the Tanzania National Bureau of Statistics report there were 29,582 people in the ward, from 26,841 in 2012.

== Neighborhoods ==
The ward has 6 neighborhoods.

- Ilemi
- Ilindi
- Maanga VETA
- Mapelele
- Masewe
- Mwafute
