= Loanda =

Loanda may refer to:

- Loanda, Paraná, a city in Brazil
- Luanda, the capital city of Angola (old spelling)

== See also ==
- Luanda (disambiguation)
