= Lufilyo =

Ward in Busokelo, Mbeya, Tanzania

Lufilyo Kata ya Lufilyo
- Ward
- Location within Tanzania
- Coordinates: 9.290466°S 33.9002015°E
- Country: Tanzania
- Region: Mbeya Region
- District: Busokelo District
- Ward: Lufilyo

Population (2016)
  - Total: 7,021
- Time zone: UTC+3 (EAT)
- Postcode: 53528

Rufiryo is an administrative ward in the Busokelo District of the Mbeya Region of Tanzania. In 2016 the Tanzania National Bureau of Statistics report there were 7,021 people in the ward, from 6,370 in 2012.

== Villages / vitongoji ==
The ward has 5 villages and 21 vitongoji.

- Kifunda
  - Kifunda
  - Landani
  - Ndumbati
  - Nsanga
- Kikuba
  - Bujonde
  - Busikali
  - Katumba
  - Kinela
  - Kipangamansi
  - Ndubi
- Kipapa
  - Katete
  - Lupando
  - Mpulo
  - Ndola
  - Sanu
- Kipyola
  - Kalengo
  - Ntalula
  - Sota
- Lusungo
  - Landani
  - Lusungo
  - Njisi
