= Kyela District =

District of Mbeya Region, Tanzania

Kyela Wilaya ya Kyela (Swahili)
- District
- Kyela District of Mbeya Region
- Coordinates: 9°37′30″S 33°52′30″E
- Country: Tanzania
- Region: Mbeya Region
- Established: 1972
- Headquarters: Kyela

Government
  - Type: Council
  - Chairman: Katule G. Kingamkono
  - Director: Ezekiel Magehema

Population (2016)
  - Total: 244,108
- Time zone: EAT
- Postcode: 537xx
- Area code: 025
- Website: District Website

Kyela is one of the seven districts of Mbeya Region, Tanzania. It is bordered to the north by Rungwe District, to the northeast by Njombe Region, to the southeast by Lake Nyasa, to the south by Malawi and to the west by Ileje District.

In 2016 the Tanzania National Bureau of Statistics report there were 244,108 people in the district, from 221,490 in 2012.

The District Commissioner of the Kyela District is Katule G. Kingamkono.

== Wards ==
The Kyela District is administratively divided into 33 wards, 93 villages, and 398 vitongoji:

- Bondeni
- Bujonde
- Busale
- Ibanda
- Ikama
- Ikimba
- Ikolo
- Ipande
- Ipinda
- Ipyana
- Itope
- Itunge
- Kajunjumele
- Katumba Songwe
- Kyela Mjini
- Lusungo
- Mababu
- Makwale
- Matema
- Mbugani
- Mikoroshini
- Muungano
- Mwanganyanga
- Mwaya
- Ndandalo
- Ndobo
- Ngana
- Ngonga
- Njisi
- Nkokwa
- Nkuyu
- Serengeti
- Talatala

== Agriculture ==
The production of rice in Kyela is mainly favored by its geographical location and weather. Rivers such as Mbaka, Kiwira, Lufilyo and Songwe flowing into Lake Malawi all cross through Kyela. This makes the district constantly have wet land that is suitable for rice production. Apart from rice, Kyela also produces other crops like bananas, cashew nuts, beans, 80% of Tanzania's cocoa production and watermelon.
