= Prince Kagwema =

Tanzanian writer

Prince Kagwema is a Tanzanian writer. He was born in 1931 in a village east of the Tukuyu in what is now Rungwe District of Mbeya Region. He studied sociology, history and English at Makerere University Kampala, and earned a Bachelor of Arts exam at Cambridge University. Between 1958 and 1976 he worked for the East African Railway Corporation in Nairobi. After that, he lived on the outskirts of Dar es Salaam. Prince Kagwema published novels Veneer of Love (1975), Married Love is a Plant (1983), Chausiku's Dozen (1983), and Society in the Dock (1984). Fear of the Unknown - Quo vadis Tanzania, published in 1985, is a contribution to the public debate.
