= Maendeleo =

Ward in Mbeya, Tanzania

Maendeleo Kata ya Maendeleo
- Ward
- Location within Tanzania
- Coordinates: 8.89°S 33.429°E
- Country: Tanzania
- Region: Mbeya Region
- District: Mbeya Urban
- Ward: Maendeleo

Population (2016)
  - Total: 3,161
- Time zone: UTC+3 (EAT)
- Postcode: 53109

Maendeleo is an administrative ward in the Mbeya Urban district of the Mbeya Region of Tanzania. In 2016 the Tanzania National Bureau of Statistics report there were 3,161 people in the ward, from 5,223 in 2012.

== Neighborhoods ==
The ward has 5 neighborhoods.

- Centre Community
- Kati
- Kiwanja Mpaka
- Kiwanja Ngoma
- Soko Matola
