= Ngualla =

Volcano in south west Tanzania

Coordinates: 7°42′44″S 32°50′09″E

Mount Ngualla, often referred to simply as Ngualla, is a collapsed volcano located in the remote south west of Tanzania. It is approximately 200 km north of the Mbeya township.

== Formation ==
Ngualla is a Proterozoic carbonatite estimated to be about 1,000 million years old and is a plug-like intrusive carbonatite with a diameter of approximately 3 km, made up of various successive carbonatite phases.

Ngualla is intrusive into Precambrian gneisses, quartzites and rhyolite-dacite volcanics. It is a carbonatite-fenite complex of oval outline with a longer axis orientated approximately north-south.

Over a north-south trending central ridge and an area of the north-western side of the complex carbonatite outcrops are found, surrounded by red soil. This is in turn surrounded by a ring of low-hills that are predominantly covered by fenite. The fenite zone is up to 1 km wide with a breccia zone adjacent to the carbonatite.

The carbonatite is broadly of three types:

1. An outer sovite that is banded and magnetite free. In this zone apatite, biotite, muscovite, quartz and chlorite are accessories.
2. An intermediate zone consisting of well banded sovite and contains euhedral magnetite and commonly dolomite.
3. A central zone comprising poorly banded sovite containing fluorite, biotite, amphibole, pargasite and rarely pyrochlore.

Dolomitic and ankeritic veins are widespread throughout the complex as are calcite-quartz veins with minor galena, baryte and chalcopyrite.

== Name ==
The name 'Ngualla' comes from the Swahili word for 'bald head', which reflects the appearance of a large piece of the mostly bare land in which there is no habitation, agriculture and very little wild life.

A panorama of Ngualla with workmen on site.

== Rare earth exploration ==
The carbonatite has important resources of rare earth elements and is currently managed by ASX-listed Peak Resources. It gained widespread attention in 2010 after it was first reported to contain quantities of rare earths oxides.

The area is also prospective for phosphate, tantalum and niobium which have also been found in commercial quantities, the area currently contains a JORC compliant resource of 1.6 million tonnes (using a 3% lower-cut grade) of rare earths.

The Ngualla rare earth deposit can be divided into two geographic and geological areas, the southern rare earth zone located in the centre of the carbonatite around Ngualla Hill, and the southwest alluvial zone. The southern rare earth zone is a 1 kilometre by 1 kilometre area in the low magnetic central core of the Ngualla carbonatite. Rare earth mineralisation occurs from the surface and is enriched in the weathered zone of the carbonatite, varying from a few metres to 140 metres vertical depth. The bulk of the mineral resource at Ngualla is contained within the southern rare earth zone and most of the highest grade component occurs near surface within the weathered zone.

The south west alluvial zone is located the south west of Ngualla with rare earth mineralisation occurring from the surface within unconsolidated ferruginous] gravels to depths up to 30 meters. These alluvials are the result of erosion, transportation and deposition from the weathered bedrock mineralisation in the southern rare earth zone.

Distribution of JORC Compliant Rare Earths found at Ngualla
	Element	Oxide	Ngualla Southern REZ %	Ngualla SW Alluvial %	Ngualla Average%
Light RE	Lanthanum	La_{2}O_{3}	27.5	23.4	27.1
Light RE	Cerium	CeO_{2}	48.3	48.1	48.3
Light RE	Praseodymium	Pr_{6}O_{11}	4.72	4.91	4.74
Light RE	Neodymium	Nd_{2}O_{3}	16.1	17.5	16.3
Light RE	Samarium	Sm_{2}O_{3}	1.59	2.14	1.65
Heavy RE	Europium	Eu_{2}O_{3}	0.32	0.53	0.35
Heavy RE	Gadolinium	Gd_{2}O_{3}	0.73	1.24	0.78
Heavy RE	Terbium	Tb_{4}O_{7}	0.06	0.13	0.07
Heavy RE	Dysprosium	Dy_{2}O_{3}	0.14	0.43	0.17
Heavy RE	Holmium	Ho_{2}O_{3}	0.02	0.06	0.02
Heavy RE	Erbium	Er_{2}O_{3}	0.05	0.14	0.06
Heavy RE	Thulium	Tm_{2}O_{3}	0.00	0.01	0.00
Heavy RE	Ytterbium	Yb_{2}O_{3}	0.02	0.07	0.02
Heavy RE	Lutetium	Lu_{2}O_{3}	0.00	0.01	0.00
Other	Yttrium	Y_{2}O_{3}	0.40	1.42	0.52
		Total	100%	100%	100%

== Mineralogical studies ==
Mineralogical studies have shown that bastnasite and synchysite are the main rare earth minerals and occur within a baryte – iron oxide hydroxide lithology in the weathered zone and a carbonate rich lithology with baryte in fresh carbonatite. Alumina is negligible and there are no clay minerals. Uranium and thorium levels are very low at 17 ppm and 37 ppm average respectively within +1% REO mineralisation in the southern rare earth zone.

In December 2012, Peak Resources announced - as part of their planned beneficiation process of the Ngualla deposit - that results had shown an intimate association between iron oxide and rare earth minerals (hematite and bastnaesite). The gangue minerals of barite and silica generally do not contain rare earth inclusions and have discrete grain boundaries with bastnaesite, indicating that grinding will separate these minerals.

Geological similarities have been drawn to fellow Australian miner Lynas's world class Western Australian project Mount Weld.
