= Rungwa people =

Ethnic group from Rukwa Region of Tanzania

The Rungwa are a Bantu ethnic and linguistic group based in the Mpanda District of Katavi Region in western Tanzania. In 1987 the Rungwa population was estimated to number 18,000 .
