= Mbeya District =

District of Mbeya Region, Tanzania

Coordinates: 8°30′S 34°00′E

Mbeya
- District
- Wilaya ya Mbeya Jijini, Mkoa wa Mbeya
- Mbeya City District of Mbeya Region
- Country: Tanzania
- Region: Mbeya Region
- First Settled: 16th century

Population (2012 Census)
  - Total: 541,603
  - Religions: Christianity Islam

Mbeya City is a district of Mbeya Region, Tanzania and comprises the area of Mbeya town. It is bordered to the north by Mbeya Rural District, to the east by Rungwe District, to the south by Ileje District and to the west by Mbozi District.

According to the 2022 Tanzania National Census, the population of Mbeya Urban District was 541,603.

== Wards ==
Mbeya Urban District is administratively divided into 36 wards:

- Forest
- Ghana
- Iduda
- Iganjo
- Iganzo
- Igawilo
- Ilemi
- Ilomba
- Isanga
- Isyesye
- Itagano
- Itende
- Itezi
- Itiji
- Iwambi
- Iyela
- Iyunga
- Iziwa
- Kalobe
- Maanga
- Mabatini
- Maendeleo
- Majengo
- Mbalizi Road
- Mwakibete
- Mwansekwa
- Mwansanga
- Nonde
- Nsalaga
- Nsoho
- Nzovwe
- Ruanda
- Sinde
- Sisimba
- Tembela
- Uyole
