= Mbeya Region =

Region of Tanzania

Mbeya Region Mkoa wa Mbeya (Swahili)
- Region
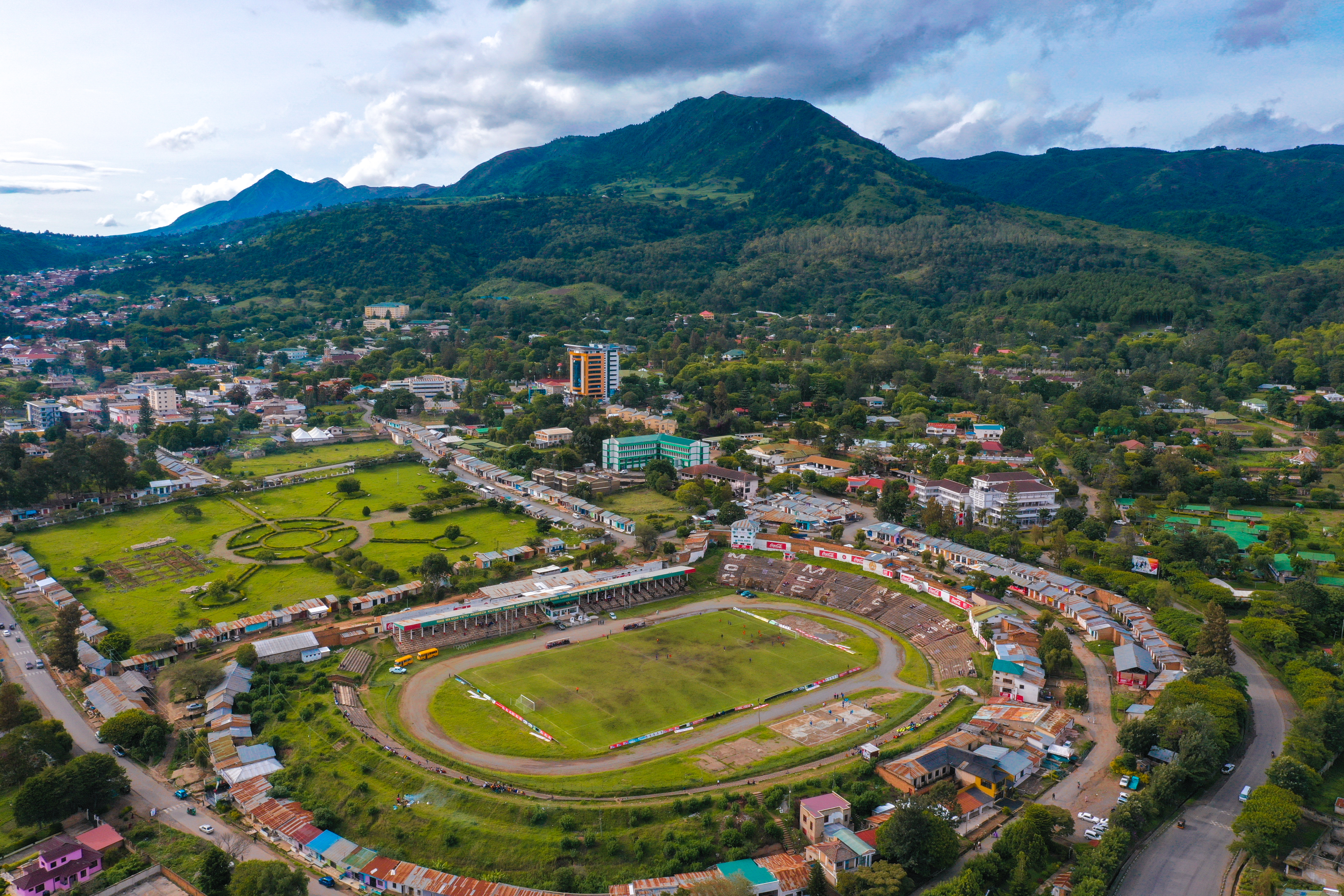
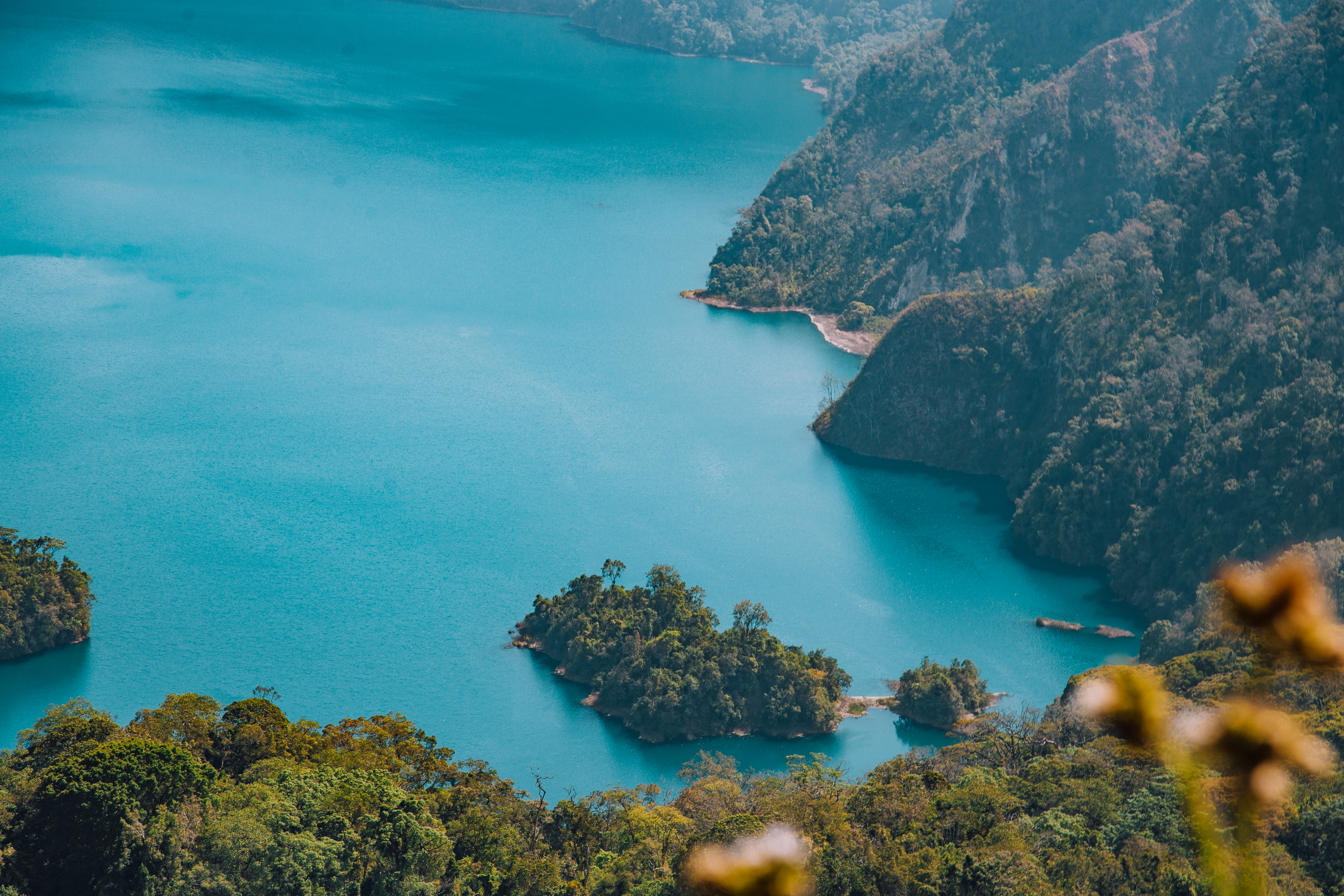
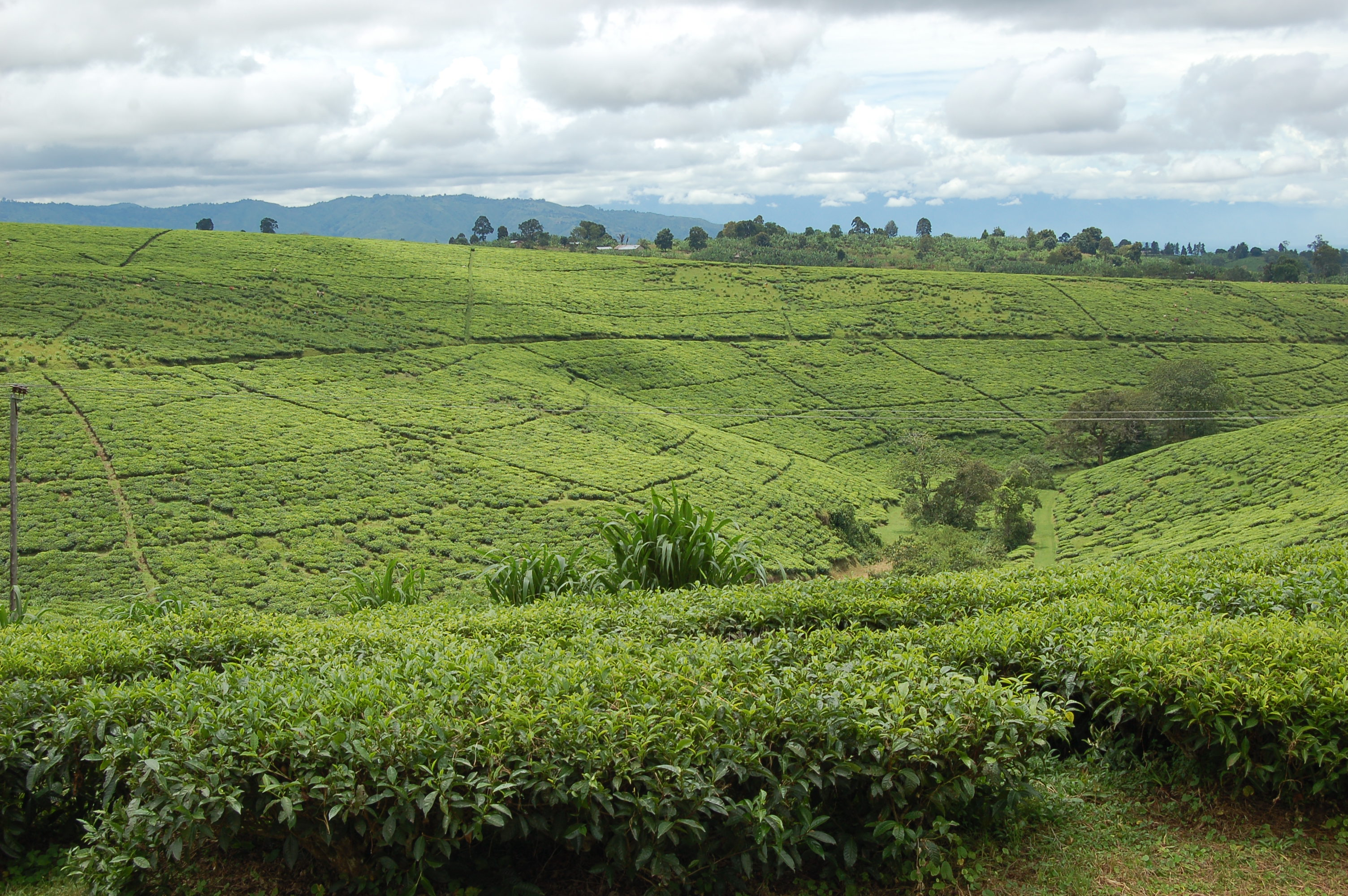
- From top to bottom: Mbeya City view, Lake Ngosi in Rungwe District and Tea plantations of Tukuyu
- Nicknames: The green region; God's garden
- Location in Tanzania
- Coordinates: 8°54′33.84″S 33°27′38.88″E
- Country: Tanzania
- Zone: Southern Highlands
- Capital: Mbeya
- Districts: List: Busokelo District; Chunya District; Kyela District; Mbarali District; Mbeya District; Rungwe District

Government
  - Regional Commissioner: Juma Zuberi Homera (CCM)

Area
  - Total: 35,954 km^{2} (13,882 sq mi)
  - Rank: 11th of 31
- Highest elevation (Mount Rungwe): 2,961 m (9,715 ft)

Population (2022)
  - Total: 2,343,754
  - Rank: 12th of 31
  - Density: 65.188/km^{2} (168.84/sq mi)
- Demonym: Mbeyan

Ethnic groups
  - Settler: Swahili, Safwa & Nyakyusa
  - Native: Nyakyusa, Sangu, Safwa, Ndali, Kinga, Wanji, Lambya, Nyiha, Wungu, Kimbu & Rungwa
- Time zone: UTC+3 (EAT)
- Postcode: 53xxx
- Area code: 025
- ISO 3166 code: TZ-14
- HDI (2021): 0.543 low · 14th of 25
- Website: Official website
- Symbols of Tanzania
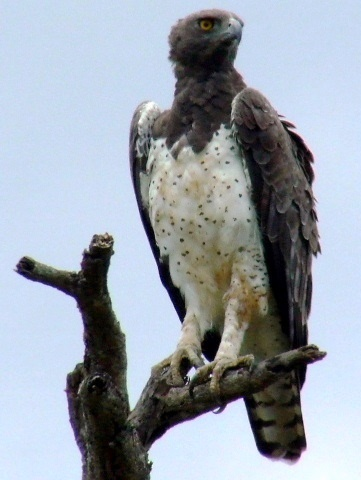
- Bird: Martial eagle

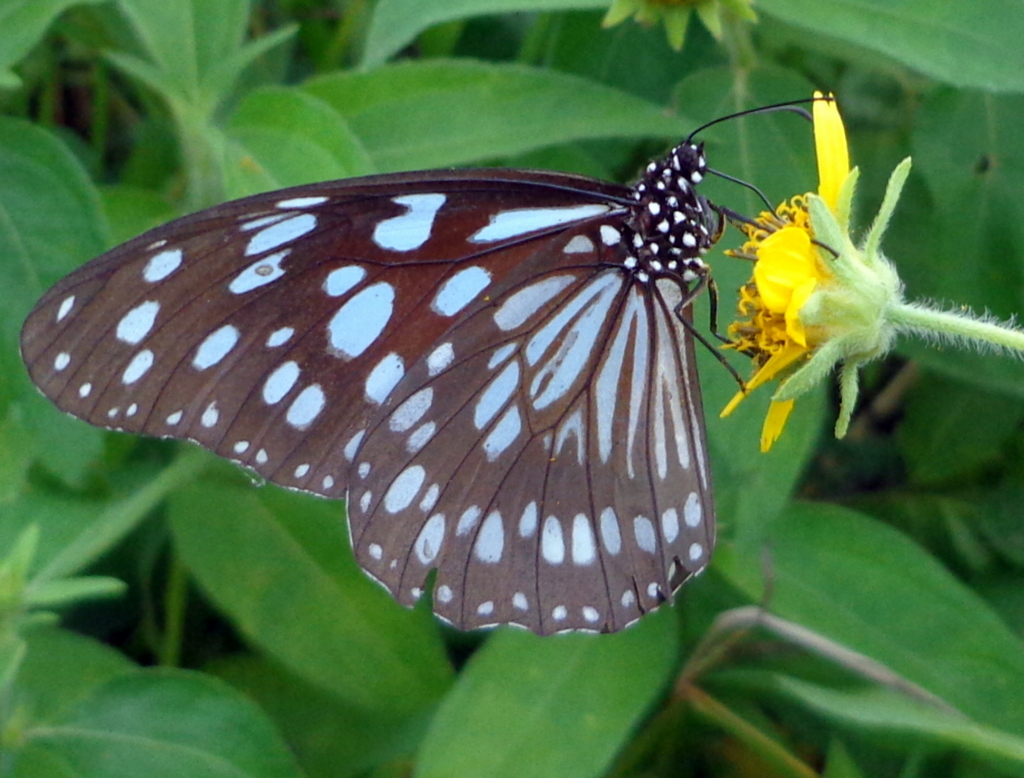
- Butterfly: Blue monarch

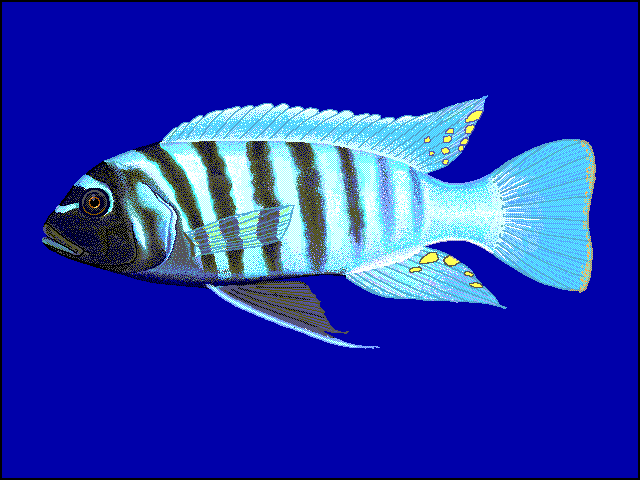
- Fish: zebra mbuna

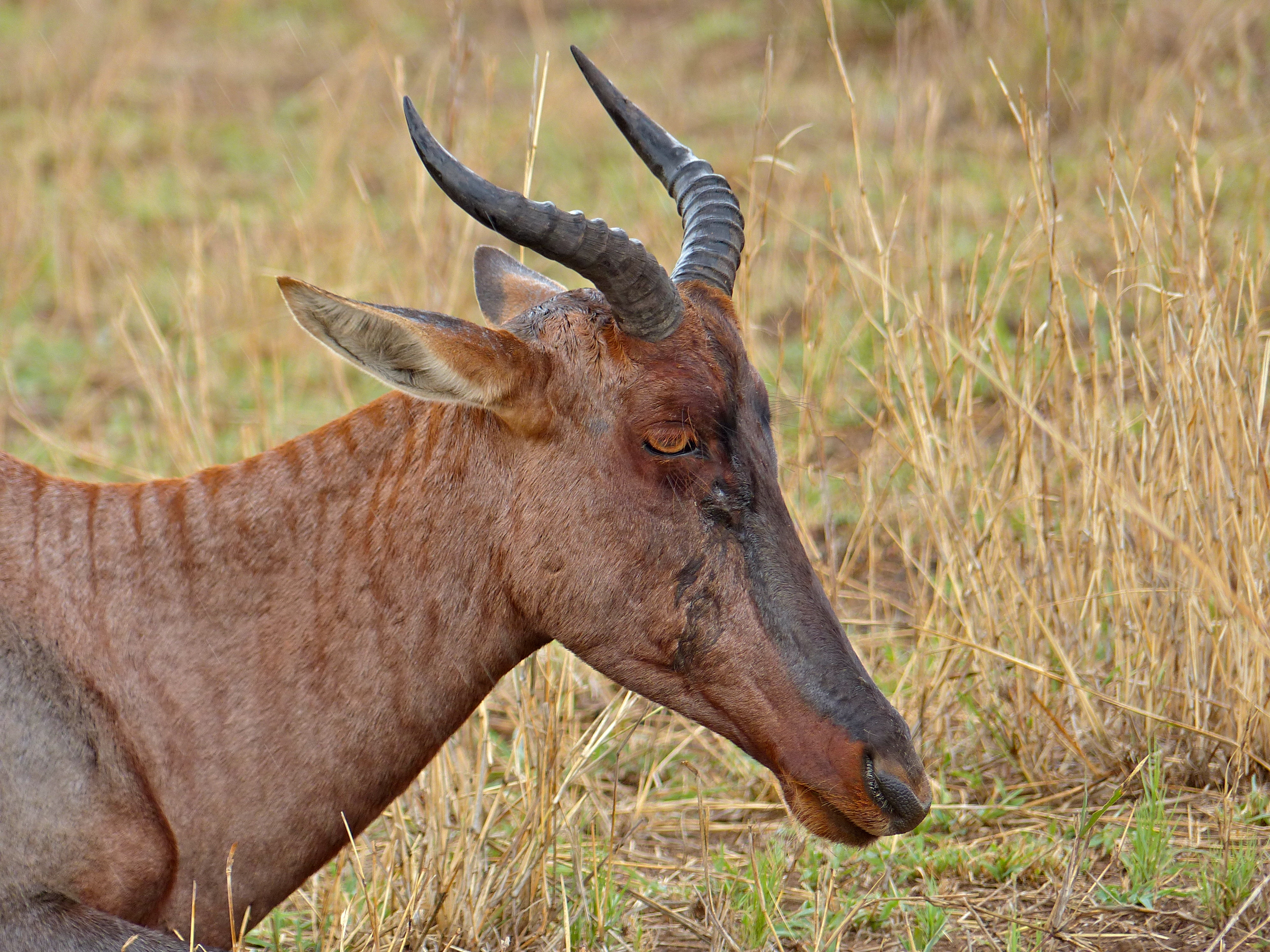
- Mammal: Tsessebe

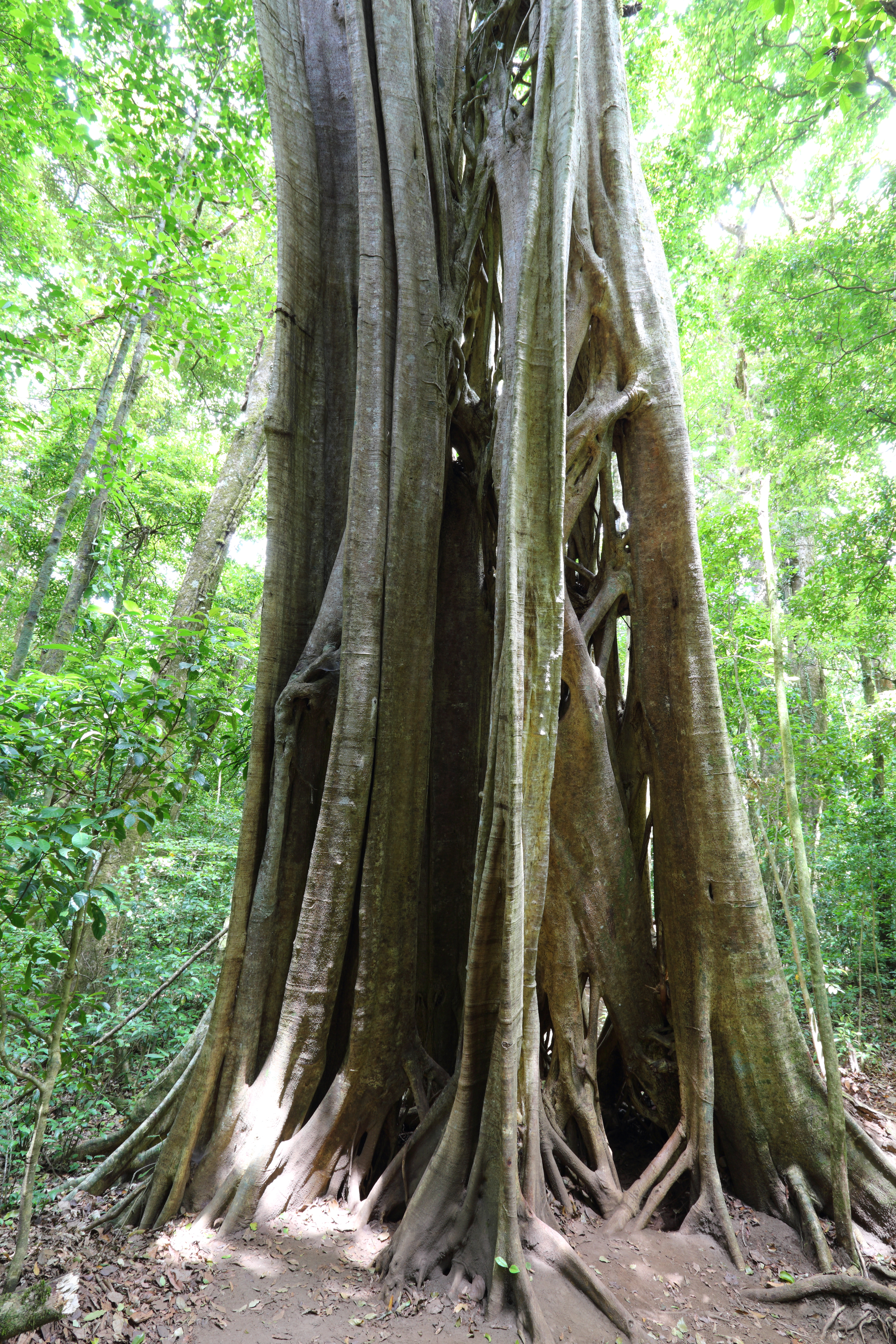
- Tree: Strangler fig

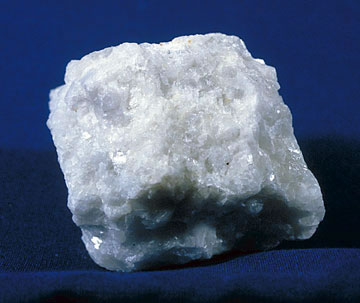
- Mineral: Marble

Mbeya Region (Swahili: Mkoa wa Mbeya) is one of Tanzania's 31 administrative regions. The region covers an area of 35,954 km^{2} (13,882 sq mi). The region is comparable in size to the combined land area of the nation state of Guinea Bissau. Mbeya Region is bordered to the east by Singida Region, Iringa Region and Njombe Region. The region is bordered to the south by Malawi and Lake Nyasa. To the north the region borders southern Tabora Region. Lastly, Mbeya is bordered to the west by Songwe Region. The regional capital is the city of Mbeya. According to the 2022 national census, the region had a population of 2,343,754.

== Geography ==
Mbeya Region is located between latitudes 7 degrees and 9 degrees 31' south of the equator and between longitudes 32 degrees and 35 degrees east of Greenwich in Tanzania's Southern Highlands Zone. The Republic of Malawi shares borders with the Mbeya Region to the south, Songwe Region to the west, Singida and Tabora Regions to the north, and Iringa and Njombe Regions to the east. Kasumulu in Kyela District serves as the primary entry and/or exit point into the Republic of Malawi, which is a neighboring country.

The Great Rift Valley created the majority of the places in the area, with the lowland elevation occupying the Western Rift Zone, which includes the Lake Rukwa and Lake Nyasa regions, and the Eastern Rift Zone, which includes the Usangu Plains and other sections of the Ruaha Trough. The heights range from 475 metres (1,558 ft) above sea level at Lake Nyasa to more than 2,900 metres (9,500 ft) at Mount Rungwe's summit.

=== Hydrology ===
The Ruaha/Rufiji Basin in the east, the inland Lake Rukwa Basin in the north-west, and the Lake Nyasa Basin in the south are the three river basins that make up the Mbeya Region. The surface runoff pattern and the unimodal rainfall distribution closely match. Tanzania's Southern Plateau's south highlands serve as a watershed for the area's primary drainage system. The Great Ruaha, Zira, Songwe, Kiwira, Lufilyo, and Mbaka are some of the major rivers in the area. One of the inlets to the Indian Ocean, the Great Ruaha River is supplied by the Kimani, Chimala, Igurusi, and other tributaries. Rivers Kiwira, Lufilyo, and Mbaka drain south into Lake Nyasa, while rivers Zira and Songwe form an inland drainage into Lake Rukwa.

Mbeya's surface area is 35,232.2 km^{2} (13,603.2 sq mi), or about 4 percent of Tanzania's total 947,300 km^{2} (365,800 sq mi). The region's entire surface area is made up of 495.9 km^{2} (191.5 sq mi) of water and 34,736.3 km^{2} (13,411.8 sq mi) of dry land. The smallest land areas belong to Mbeya City Council (250.2 km^{2} (96.6 sq mi)) and Busokelo District Council (847.1 km^{2} (327.1 sq mi)).

=== Climate ===
The Mbeya Region has a tropical climate, with lowlands temperatures of 25 °C (77 °F) and highlands temperatures of 16 °C (61 °F). The rainy season lasts from October to May. The Usangu Plains and Chunya receive 650 millimetres (26 in) of rain annually, while the mountains of Rungwe District Council and the northern coasts of Lake Nyasa receive 2,600 mm (100 in). June through September are the cold and dry months in the area. The soils and vegetation types in the area exhibit significant variance. Most of the region's arable land has soils with a medium texture, moderate fertility, and ranges from sandy loams to alluvial soils to cracked clays. The majority of the territory is covered with Miombo woodland, with annual rainfall ranging from 800 to 1,200 mm (31 to 47 in). Less rainy areas, particularly in the region's north, encourage the development of dense acacia and other thorny tree thickets as well as woodland grassland.

=== Geology ===
It was announced in February 2012 that the collapsed volcano approximately 200 kilometres (120 mi) north of Mbeya, Mount Ngualla, contained one of the largest rare earth oxide deposits in the world.

== Economy ==
=== Agriculture ===
Agriculture (crops and cattle), natural resources (forest, fish, wildlife, and minerals), tourism, and industrial growth are the key producing sectors of the Mbeya Region that serve as the main engines of the regional economy. The economic performance of the Mbeya Region are dominated by agriculture, which employs roughly 80% of the working population in the area and makes up about 40% of the regional economy. Agriculture consists primarily of peasant farming, with a limited amount of commercial production of rice in Mbarali District and tea in Rungwe District.

Tanzania's Mbeya Region is renowned for producing a wide range of food crops, including maize, paddy, sorghum, beans, round potatoes, sweet potatoes, cassava, bananas, groundnuts, simsim, fruits, and vegetables. From 2017 to 2019, the largest food producers were the Rungwe, Mbeya, and Mbarali District Councils, with annual production of 1,144,346.4 tonnes (37.2%) (Rungwe District Council), 530,064.8 tonnes (17.2%), and 490,644.3 tonnes (15.9%), respectively (Mbarali District Council). The primary crop of Mbeya is potatoes, which produce 925,266.9 tonnes. Maize comes in second with 669,079.8, followed by banana plantains (541,493.0 tonnes), paddy (396,044.8 tonnes), cassava (231,853.4 tonnes), and sweet potatoes (170,906.8 tonnes). Beans, wheat, sorghum, cow peas, and cocoyam are some more crops with an annual production below 100,000 tonnes.

Coffee, tea, tobacco, pyrethrum, wheat, sunflower, spices, cocoa, and oil palm are the principal cash crops farmed in the area. Smallholder farmers are the principal producers of these crops. The Rungwe and Busokelo districts are primarily where tea, coffee, and spice crops are grown. In the Mbeya District, pyrethrum and wheat are produced; in the Kyela, Rungwe, and Busokelo districts, cocoa and oil palm are primarily planted. Sunflower is grown in Mbarali and Chunya Districts, whereas tobacco is primarily grown in Chunya District.

=== Industry ===
Small-scale agroindustrial and forestry-based businesses make up the majority of the Mbeya Region's industrial sector. 3,540 small businesses operated in the area in 2016, with more businesses engaged in milling (39.5%), carpentry (26.8%), timber processing (11.5%), and welding (9.0%). 6,800 persons were employed overall by them. 13 medium-sized businesses operated in the area during that time, with Mbeya City accounting for 61.5 percent of all businesses in this category. There aren't many large-scale industries, but those that do exist include those that make cement, brew beer, process tea, make soft beverages, and produce granite and marble. Mbeya City Council is where the majority of industries are located, followed by Rungwe District Council.

Mineral diversity is abundant in the Mbeya Region. The majority of minerals in the area have not yet been exploited and are currently being mined by small-scale operators using artisanal technologies. Gold, coal, sand, stones, morum, and industrial minerals including marble, limestone, iron ore, and phosphates are among the different types of minerals that may be found in the area. Additionally, the Mbeya District Council, Rungwe District, and Mbarali District also have significant marble reserves (Chalihumbi & Lugelele). Large gold reserves may be discovered across Chunya, Mbarali (Mabadaga), and Kyela (Mwalisi & Luvalisi).

=== Wildlife and Reserves ===
Wildlife can be found in great variety in the Mbeya Region. The area is home to two national parks (Ruaha and Kitulo) and four game reserves namely; Mpanga Kipengere, Usungu, Rukwati Piti Game Reserve and Mount Rungwe Game Reserve. Natural open spaces including Rungwa Mzombe and Rungwa South, and a number of game restricted areas.

== Demographics ==
The historic native tribes of the Mbeya region are of Bantu origin, and it is thought that they have lived there for a very long period. They are the Sangu, Safwa, Nyakyusa, Ndali, Kinga, Wanji, Lambya, Nyiha, Wungu, Kimbu & Rungwa. The Maasai and Sukuma now live in the Chunya and Mbeya Districts as a result of extensive interregional and intraregional movement of tribes between 1970 and 1990. In urban areas like Mbeya Municipality and the District centers, a fairly diverse tribal population is typical.

=== Population change post-independence ===
From 776,373 in the 1967 census to 1,080,241 in the 1978 census, the population of the Mbeya area increased at a pace of 3.3% per year, as opposed to an average of 3.4% per year during the 1957 and 1967 population census. By the time of the 1988 population census, there were 1,476,199 inhabitants in the country. This made Mbeya one of the most populous regions in Tanzania after Shinyanga and Mwanza, making up around 6% of the country's total population on the mainland. Mbeya is consequently one of the areas with rapid population expansion. Population growth was 3.1 percent, according to the census of 1988. According to a 3.1 percent yearly average growth rate from 1978 to 1988, the region's population is predicted to be 2.2 million people by the year 2000.

According to the 2012 national census, the region had a population of 2,707,410, which was lower than the pre-census projection of 2,822,396. For 2002-2012, the region's 2.7 percent average annual population growth rate was tied for the tenth highest in the country. It was also tied for the eighteenth most densely populated region with 45 people per square kilometre.

== Administrative divisions ==
In 2016, the town of Tunduma and the districts of Ileje, Mbozi, Momba and Songwe (created from the western part of Chunya District) were split from Mbeya Region to create Songwe Region. Mbeya Region is now bordered to the northwest by Tabora Region, to the northeast by Singida Region, to the east by Iringa Region, to the south by Songwe Region and Malawi, and to the west by Songwe Region. Prior to the creation of Songwe Region, Mbeya Region covered an area of 62,420 square kilometres (24,100 mi^{2}). It now covers an area of 35,954 square kilometres (13,882 mi^{2}).

=== Districts ===
==== 2012 ====
In 2012, Mbeya Region was administratively divided into eight districts:

Districts of Mbeya Region in 2012
Map	District	Population (2012 Census)
	Chunya District	290,478
	Ileje District	124,451
	Kyela District	221,490
	Mbarali District	300,517
	Mbeya District	690,598
	Mbozi District	446,339
	Momba District	294,380
	Rungwe District	339,157
	Total	2,707,410

==== 2016 ====
After the 2016 reorganization, Mbeya Region now comprises seven districts:

Districts of Mbeya Region in 2016
Map	District	Population (2022 Census)
	Busokelo District	100,123
	Chunya District	344,471
	Kyela District	266,426
	Mbarali District	446,336
	Mbeya District	541,603
	Mbeya City	371,259
	Rungwe District	273,536
	Total	2,343,754

== National Parks ==
- Kitulo National Park
- Lake Ngosi (Crater lake)
- Matema Beach
- Mount Rungwe Forest Reserve
- Ruaha National Park

== Transport ==
Mbeya Region is accessible by Roads, rail, air and water through Lake Nyasa.

=== Airports ===
Mbeya Region is served by Songwe International Airport which is located in Mbeya district at Songwe area. Currently the only carrier which have scheduled flights is Air Tanzania with daily flights to Dar es salaam. There are also other chartered flights to other places such as Ruaha National Park. TANZAM Highway (T1) which is part of the Great North road (A 104) pass through the region, it connects with Njombe Region to the East and Songwe Region to the West. The B - 345 road connect the region with Malawi to the south from Uyole. Chunya road connects the region with Singida and Tabora to the North-East and North-West respectively.

Mbeya Region is bordered by Lake Nyasa to the South East. The lake is used for transport by Mbeya Region and the neighboring regions of Njombe, Ruvuma and the country of Malawi. Three ships, two cargo ships, MV Njombe and MV Ruvuma, and one for passengers, MV Mbeya II, are on final stages of construction and are expected to start operations at the end of 2019. The TAZARA rail pass through the region and connects which connects it to the Port city of Dar es salaam and Zambia.

=== Healthcare ===
A referral hospital is located in Mbeya City, and there are 336 public and private health care institutions spread throughout the Mbeya Region.

== Notable people ==
- Prince Kagwema, writer
- Albert Mangwea, musician
- Joseph Mbilinyi, musician and politician
- Tolly Mbwette, academic
- Fadhy Mtanga, novelist
- Godfrey Mwakikagile, scholar and author
- Harrison Mwakyembe, politician
- Davis Mwamunyange, former chief of the Tanzanian Defence Forces
- Mark Mwandosya, politician
- Christopher Mwashinga, writer
- Imani Sanga, music professor
- Raymond Shaban, musician
