= Wanda people =

Ethnic group from Rukwa Region of Tanzania

The Wanda are a Bantu ethno-linguistic group based in Mbeya Region and Sumbawanga District of southern Rukwa Region of Tanzania. The Wanda population was estimated to be 24,000 in 1987, having increased from 5,745 in 1931, 7,677 in 1948, and 9,477 in 1957.

== Language ==
The Wanda's native dialect is also called Wanda. Linguists group Wanda with Fipa, Lungu, Nyamwanga, Pimbwe, and Kuulwe as dialects of a single language. Most people also speak some Swahili.

== Political system ==
Following German occupation, the Wanda came under British rule, and the northern chiefdom of Uwanda was abolished, being incorporated into the Fipa chiefdom of Lyangalile. The chief was always called Mwene, and was generally related to others in the group. The Mwene was greeted with clapping hands and the phrases "You are the only one" or "Guard us well".

== Customs ==
As with many of the peoples of southwest Tanzania, in marriage ceremonies the groom carried a bow in his right-hand and an arrow in his left "to pierce any man who seduces your wife".

At a chief's burial a grave is dug inside the chief's hut, but only after a whole sheep is buried. The chief is placed in a sitting position on his royal stool, with a brightly colored bird's feather placed in his hair.

The main crops of the Wanda were finger millet, sorghum, sesame, peanuts, and maize. These crops were cultivated on ridges. Iron tools and weapons were not produced by the Wanda, these being traded in, mostly from the Fipa.

The Wanda worshipped gods, certain large trees, and the graves of certain chiefs.
