= Basimba people =

Ugandan community

The Basimba (alternatively BaShimba, Musimba, or MuShimba) are a Bantu-speaking community in Uganda. The name Basimba (Swahili for "big lion" or "great lion" Simbakubwa is a label of shared identity that predates the 13th century. Basimba has been alternatively associated with the people or their place of origin. The early Ovambo people applied the name to the whole group of the leopard totem clan, known as Bena Ngo in Zambia and Abe Ngo in Uganda.

The Ethnology describes their location on the Cunene river as follows: on the right bank of the lower Kunene River, Portuguese West Africa; are Bashimba, also known as Basimba, Baximba, Musimba, Simbeba. According to Friedrich Ratzel, the Basimba or Simbeba (more commonly spelled " Cimbebas ") live along the coast to the right of the Cunene.

== Mataman or Cimbebas Kingdom ==
The name Cimbebasia (or Cimbebas) was derived from local indigenous groups known as the Ba-Simba, who lived beyond the Cunene River. Early maps and missionary records used this term to cover vast portions of modern-day Namibia and southern Angola. According to Élisée Reclus , the peoples dwelling beyond the Cunene River known as Ba-Simba were mentioned in old documents as Cimbebas, whose ancient Kingdom was known as Mataman or Cimbebas.

Cimbebasia (or Cimbebas) was an archaic historical and cartographic name for the arid expanse of western Southern Africa, stretching between the Kunene River, the lower Kasai River, and the western reaches of the Zambezi River (encompassing parts of modern-day Angola and Namibia). Historically, European mapmakers and early documents applied the name to the indigenous Ba-Simba peoples. Early European mapmakers and explorers often used these terms interchangeably to describe a loosely defined indigenous empire or tribe living beyond the Cunene River. The name Cimbebas was derived from a local indigenous group known as the Ba-Simba. At the same time, the Kingdom of Mataman generally referred to a densely populated, pastoralist area near the Chela Mountains.

Today, while the ancient "kingdoms" no longer exist, their names live on in the region. For instance, Cimbebasia is an active, well-known southern residential suburb in Windhoek, Namibia, featuring developments like the affordable Cimbebasia Housing Project and the prominent Mataman Street.

== Relations to Kitara and Kooki Kingdom ==
The Basimba have historically lived in the Bunyoro-Kitara region. They are famous for maintaining indigenous salt-mining technology at Kibiro, a heritage practice passed down for centuries by the Basimba ancestors. The Kibiro Salt producing village is an ancient Archaeological excavation and living heritage site on the shores of Lake Albert, Uganda. Famous for an 800-year-old artisanal ash- Salt extraction method, this matriarchal industry has sustained the local community for centuries. Located in the Western Rift Valley at the base of the Hoima escarpment, Kibiro represents a rare blend of living tradition and deep Archaeology. The site has been included on the UNESCO Tentative Heritage List since 1997, and remains a focal point for global recognition.The Basimba are explicitly listed among the 13 clans that founded the Kooki Kingdom.

== Relations to Herero ==
According to Elisee Reclus, amongst the Hereros is also found a cattleless proletariate class, men unattached to the fortunes of any rich owner of herds, and who live on the chase, or lead a roaming, adventuresome existence. Such are the Ova-Tjimbas or Tjimba people, kinsmen of the Ba-Simbas (Cimbebas).

== Relations to Buganda ==
Before the creation of the Kingdom of Buganda, the area was initially known as Muwaawa. With the support of 13 clans, including the Basimba/Leopard (Ngo) clan, Kato Kintu established the Kingdom of Buganda in the 14th century. He became the nation's first kabaka, the official title of the king of Buganda. The Leopard (Ngo) clan has historically experienced high levels of persecution due to their notable role in the cult of Kintu. Under the rule of King Kateregga of Buganda, 400 members of the clan were executed c.1674-1680 in the current Butambala District, prompting survivors to conceal their cultural identity. Similar clan-based violence has been recorded during the rule of Kabaka Jjunju of Buganda as well.

== Royal links ==
The Basimba are considered a ruling clan alongside other royal clans that migrated from the Kingdom of Luba to the Luapula Valley in Northern Rhodesia.

Multiple kingship groups are recognised within the Basimba, including the Leopard (Ngo) clan. The Basimba kingship group was often persecuted due to its royal links. Among the many Leopard clan branches, one was eligible for the throne. The reigning kings of Buganda would capture this group and execute most of its men to reduce the risk of being overthrown.

After the death of Kabaka Nakibinge of Buganda, his wife Nannono of the Leopard (Ngo) clan presided as Kabaka for eighteen months between 1554 and 1556 AD. After this event, the name Nabulya was introduced into the Leopard (Ngo) clan to remind other clans in Buganda that a woman from the Leopard totem clan once had power in the Buganda Kingdom. "Nabuyla" means ‘I ate it,’ insinuating that the clan once took royal power.

=== Migration ===
Although there are few historical records regarding the Basimba (Big Lion) people, they should be discussed due to their close historical connection with the BaShimba, who all belong to the Leopard (Ngo) clan. Most Basimba people claim their origins lie in the Congo, among the Luba people of the Kingdom of Luba. Little is known about these immigrants, but traces of their history are found in the legend of the Tabwa ancestor.

Kyomba, a legendary ancestor of the Tabwa, lived on the eastern shores of Lake Tanganyika. Faced with Hamitic pressures in the north and other people from the south, Kyomba and his companions crossed Lake Tanganyika, migrating to the western shores of the lake after a conspiracy mounted and hatched against him reached the shores of Lake Kivu. Then they crossed the Ruzizi and arrived in Maniema on the banks of the river Lualaba in the second half of the 16th century. Fanger, son of Kyomba, and his companions continued their migration up the river while others went elsewhere. The name Tumanya means “those who have followed the route by water,’’ and Bena Kilunga means “those who followed the path on land in their migration.” The Bena Kilunga group migrated to the eastern banks of the Lualaba River and Lukunga River together with Buanza, Mumba, and the Basimba people.

The Tumanya group migrated to Ankori, or the Nkole people, and eastwards, following the Luvua (Lualaba), while their companions followed the Lualaba River to back the lagoons in Upemba Depression. It was around the 17th century when the gradual arrival of people in the mountains from the plains of Lualaba Kamalondo was named the "Kundelungu" Mountains. Finally, Tanga and his father Kyomba migrated further across the Luapula at the current location of the position of Kasenga and settled in southern Tanganyika, where they were joined by members of the Zimba Clan, avoiding quarrels with Movwe who migrated to the Marungu highlands.

The Basimba or BaShimba immigrants seem to have come in ethnic groups under the leadership of Mambwe, Mauwe, Katunku, which name means "An edible berry, red when ripe, with an unpleasant smell " in Luganda – English And English- Luganda Vocabulary according to G. L. Pilkington, Ngulya, Mwati, Kaabya, Ntembe, Namuyonjo, Kabolesa, Kitembwa, and Kooli, among others. When these people reached the Luapula Valley in the current Luapula Province in Zambia, Mwanza Region, Northern Tanzania, and Butambala in Uganda, they decided to settle, and the leader became the family or clan head. As the Basimba or BaShimba settlement grew, the original leader, after several generations, became a mythical figure to his descendants.

Basimba or BaShimba people are recognized to be indigenous peoples because they were the first comers among the immigrants in Zambia or Northern Rhodesia by then and in Tanzania. According to local tradition, the original inhabitants were a clan called the Basimba who lived in the area of Busere on Ukara Island, in the southeast corner of Lake Victoria, but it is not known what language they spoke, and there are none of their descendants surviving. Tradition makes no mention of fighting between the Basimba immigrants and the people whom they found in Uhaya in Tanzania and at Butambala in Uganda. The Bashimba of the Leopard clan) successfully resisted Nkuba in Northern Rhodesia (Zambia).

== Original homeland ==
The original homeland of the Basimba or BaShimba people, or their ancestry, is shrouded in myths and legends. They seem to have lost contact with their original ancestors in Congo among the Luba people, leading a cluster of Basimba (Big Lion) people to migrate north from Mweru-Luapula to Mwanza Region, eventually erecting human settlements among the Haya people in Tanzania, then at:

- Butambala District in central Uganda, Buddu in Masaka District,
- Ntakaiwolu in Busoga,
- Mpogo in Sironko District,
- Butaleja District and *Lupada, Naboa, *Budaka District,
- among the Gwere people, in eastern Uganda. Other Bashimba people settled in Northern Rhodesia (Zambia), which was part of Zimbabwe.

== Culture ==
The Basimba practice rituals and ceremonies of the Chishimba spirit similar to the Loa or Kongo Loa culture practiced by the Basimba people of Haiti, who were sold into slavery in Haiti from Congo.

The Basimba (Big Lion) people in Uganda maintain the Basimba Spiritual Stone, which represents the Chishimba spirit and is related to the institution of kingship. Its absence constitutes the absence of political power. According to traditional African religions, the Chishimba spirit is synonymous with kingship and similar to the Kintu cult practised by the leopard (Ngo) Clan people in Buganda. The Chishimba is kept in a specially prepared basket called ichipe ca calo, the basket of the nation or land. It is wrapped in bark cloth and kept in a specifically prepared shrine (ing'anda yaba Ba Chishimba or esawo lye ejjembe lya Basimba) dedicated to the spirit.

Basimba people worked with the Bunyoro-Kitara kingdom's priest in charge of the sacred pool of Muntebere. Each year, the Bunyoro king sent a young slave woman, two cows, and a white sheep to the priest. The slave woman was given as a wife to one of the Abasimba clan, who was a servant of the priest.

=== Traditional beliefs ===
According to the Basimba tradition, an afterlife does take place in another world in another form of existence. The Basimba attitude towards dead ancestors is like their attitude towards living parents and grandparents. A ritual to contact dead ancestors is practised by the Basimba people. It is similar to Haitian Vodou art, related to Loa, a Haitian Vodou religion practiced by the Basimba people of Haiti, an island that was proclaimed an independent republic in 1804 and often lasts all night.

=== The abasimba dance ===
The Abasimba dance of the Basimba people is a hunting dance performed by the Wajita or Jita people of Ukerewe Island. Their clan names of Uganda, Tanzania, and Zambia are named after their lineal ancestors.

== Beliefs ==
Today, between 40% and 50% of the Basimba people are Christians and 50% are Muslim. Besides that, traditional beliefs are very widespread among them. The most important features are ancestor worship (the term is called inappropriate by some authors) and totemism.

The Basimba of Kisangani, who martyred Dr Paul Carison of the Christ Church during the Congo Crisis of 1964–1965, participated in the Simba Rebellion, which was later defeated.

== Totems ==
Basimba totems (Muziro) have been in use among the Basimba people since the initial development of their culture. Totems identify the different clans among the Basimba people that historically made up the dynasties of their ancient civilisation. Seven different totems have been identified among the Basimba (Big Lion) people in Zimbabwe, Congo, Zambia, and Uganda, such as the Basimba among the Haya Tribe in Tanzania. People of the same clan use a common set of totems, usually animals or birds.

Examples of animal totems include Ngo/mbwili (Leopard), Leopard Cat, Genet Cat, which in the Lega language is known as Musimba and also known as Kasimba in the Luganda language and known as Zimba in the Luba language, Nshimba in the Bemba language, Lion (Mpologoma), Mbwa (Dog), Kikere (Frog) and Nkoko (Rooster). People of the same totem are the descendants of one common ancestor (the founder of that totem) and thus are not allowed to marry or have an intimate relationship. The totems cross-regional groupings and, therefore, provide a wall for the development of ethnic groups among the Basimba.

Basimba chiefs are required to be able to recite the history of their totem group, right from the initial founder, before they can be sworn in as chiefs.

=== Orphans ===
The totem system is a severe problem for many orphans, especially for Basimba or BaShimba women married to members of other clans. The Basimba people are afraid of being punished by ghosts if they violate rules connected with the unknown totem of a foundling. Therefore, it is difficult to find adoptive parents for such children. If the foundlings grow up, they have problems getting married and, on their deaths, are not buried in the Basimba ancestral grounds.

== Burials ==
Identification by totem has important ramifications in traditional ceremonies such as the Basimba burial ceremony. A person with a different totem cannot initiate the burial of the deceased. Only a person of the same totem, even when coming from a different tribe, can initiate the burial of the deceased. For example, a Muganda of the Ngo (Leopard) totem among Clans of Baganda can initiate the burial of a Musimba of the Leopard totem, and that is perfectly acceptable in Basimba tradition. However, a Musimba of a different totem cannot perform the ritual functions required to initiate the burial of the deceased.

If a person initiates the burial of a person of a different totem, he runs the risk of being asked to pay a fine to the family of the deceased. Such fines were traditionally paid with cattle or goats, but nowadays substantial amounts of money can be asked for. If they bury their dead family members, they will come back at some point to cleanse the stone of the burial.

== Basimba clan groups ==
The Basimba people consider themselves subjects of the Chishimba, the Basimba's single paramount Chief. They live in villages of 50 to 100 people and numbered 100,000 in 2016. There are seven Basimba (Big Lion) people. Clan groups named after animals:

1. The Leopard, (Ngo) clan
2. The Leopard Cat clan
3. The Genet Cat (Kasimba) clan
4. The Lion, (Mpologoma) clan
5. The Frog clan
6. The Dog clan
7. The Rooster clan

Some of the Basimba people migrated northwards from Luapula Valley after the disintegration of the Shila states, and others remained in Northern Rhodesia, currently known as the BaShimba or Abeena Ngo (Leopard) totem clan. The BaShimba Leopard totem clan is a ruling clan among the Lungu and Bemba.

== Geographic distribution ==
The Basimba people exist in Zambia, formerly known as Northern Rhodesia, Zimbabwe, Uganda, Haiti, the DR Congo, Gabon and Tanzania. The word "Basimba" or "BaShimba" has several meanings. It may designate people of Basimba origin regardless of where they live, e.g., whether they live in urban areas or in the original rural Basimba areas of Mpogo, Sironko, Lupada, Naboa in Budaka District or Butambala District, Mooni, Mbale District in Uganda, Luapula Valley in Zambia or Northern Rhodesia and Kagera Region among the Haya people in Bugorora Ward or County of Missenyi District in Tanzania. The original language of the Basimba people is unknown.

The BaShimba people living in Zambia's Northern Province, among the Lungu and Bemba tribes, speak the language that is most closely related to the Bantu languages, the Lungu and ChiBemba (in Zambia and the DRC), Haya (in Tanzania), and Luganda of the Baganda and Lugwere of the Gwere people (in Uganda). In Uganda, Luganda is spoken in the central and eastern parts of the country and has become the most widely spoken language in the Country, although not always as a first language.

== Genealogy ==
The history or genealogy of the Basimba (Big Lion) people has given rise to numerous debates among historians as to whether the Basimba people of the Leopard (Ngo) Clan in Uganda came with Kabaka and Kato Kintu in the 14th century or migrated either directly from the Congo or the Luapula valley to Uganda.

Some historians, anthropologists, and sociologists, including David William Cohen, Ian George Cunnison, Hans Cory, Mwelwa Chambika Musambachine, Gideon Were, Stephen Kyeyune, Tausir Niane, Mary Douglas, M. Hartnoll, Dr. Schinz, and Fisher A. B., among others, have written books about Basimba people but have not stated the names of the Basimba ancestors who left the Luba people in Congo and migrated to places like Zambia, Zimbabwe, Tanzania, and Uganda. Some historians writing histories of Africa use imprecise narrative sources to estimate these numbers, so they should be treated with caution. Societies such as the Anthropological Society of London and the Ethnological Society of London have also not yet published physical or cultural aspects of the Basimba people, due to the pronunciation of the name Basimba as Vazimba who migrated from East Africa and settled in Madagascar. The Vazimba are kinsmen of the Ba-Simba. Linguistic studies confirm that ancient Vazimba and Beosi vocabularies contain several loanwords from mainland Bantu languages (such as goma for drum, related to Swahili ngoma and Luganda engoma, and mana for child, related to mwana). They lived in small, scattered communities and chiefdoms across the central plateau, often governed by queens or kings. Oral traditions, such as the Tantara ny Andriana, name figures like Andriandravindravina as early Vazimba sovereigns.
