= Fipa =

Fipa or FIPA may refer to:

== Fipa ==
- Fipa people, an ethnic and linguistic group in Tanzania, Africa
  - Fipa language

== FIPA ==
- Familial intestinal polyatresia syndrome, a rare hereditary disease
- Familial isolated pituitary adenoma, a hereditary disease associated with multiple endocrine neoplasia type 1 and Carney complex
- Federation Internationale des Producteurs Agricoles (International Federation of Agricultural Producers), a defunct international organization for farm organizations
- Festival International de Programmes Audiovisuels, an award program based in France for audiovisual productions from around the world in the French language
- Foreign investment promotion and protection agreement, any of numerous investment agreements between Canada and other countries
- Foundation for Intelligent Physical Agents, an international organization for computer software standards for agent oriented systems
- Florida Information Protection Act, a 2014 Florida state law governing privacy rules for entities handling personal information
- Fixed-income performance attribution, methods for measuring the performance of fixed-income investment portfolios
- International Federation of Padbol Associates
