= Rukwa Valley =

Valley in Tanzania

Coordinates: 8°1′50.12″S 32°0′26.91″E

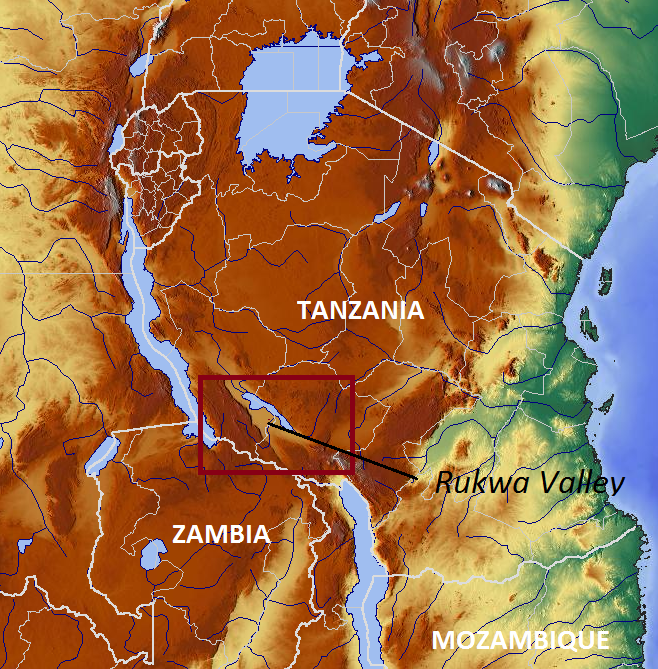
Location of the Rukwa Valley

The Rukwa Valley is a valley located in Rukwa Region, Songwe Region and Katavi Region in southwestern Tanzania. The valley is a part of the Great Rift Valley. Sparsely populated because of its harsh environment, its grassland biodiversity includes thousands of species.

== Geography ==
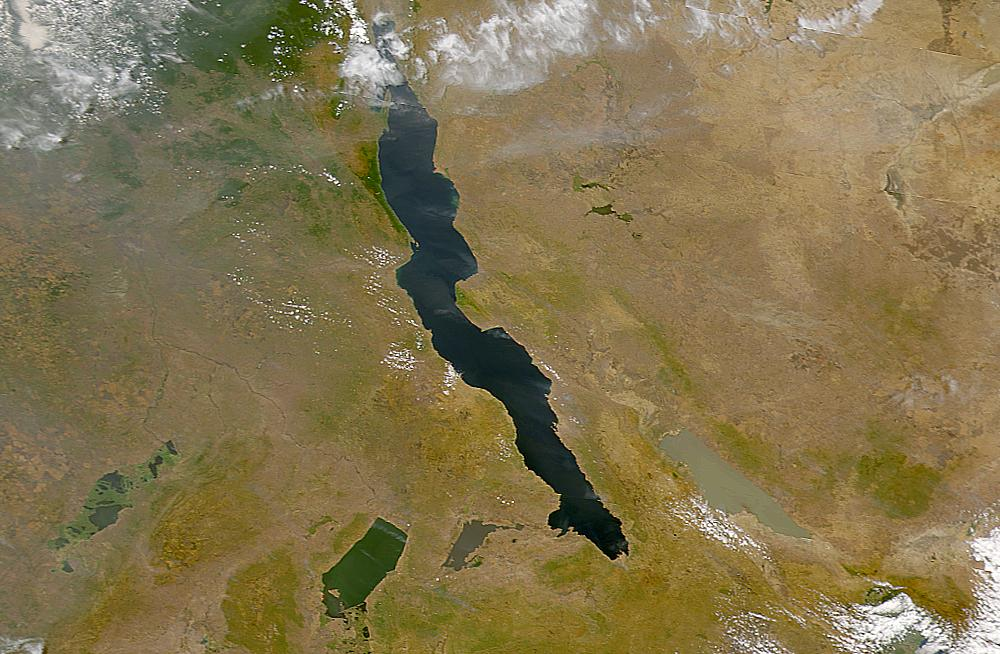
A satellite view of the valley. It is located between the smaller lake Rukwa and the southeast of the larger Lake Tanganyika

The valley lies at an elevation of 2,600 feet (790 m) above sea level. It is located between Lake Nyasa and Lake Tanganyika. Its low southeastern edge includes the shallow, alkaline Lake Rukwa, which is fringed by the North and Central Rukwa plains. The valley is to the northwest of Mbeya, and stretches as far as Karema and the Luakuga Gap. It is bounded to the east and west by high escarpments, 25–30 miles (40–48 km) apart. The Rukwa Rift is 30 miles (48 km) wide and 200 miles (320 km) in length. The valley also includes the Kafufu, the Myakaliza, the Magamba, the Ambala and the Luhumuka Rivers.

== Climate ==
Seasonal differences are extreme. The Rukwa's location within the tropics accounts for its one rainy season. Rainfall occurs during the months of November through April, and can vary between 20–40 inches (510–1,020 mm). Because of the only slight variations in grade, flooding is common. Conversely, the dry months of May through October are arid, and in comparison to the cooler Ufipa Plateau, the valley is hot.

== Wildlife ==
There are three main flora zones in the Rukwa Valley: the treeless grass plains, a belt of open woodland, and the escarpment area. Valley grassland and wooded grassland are differentiated by the illuvial soil of the former and the colluvial soil of the latter. The woodland is partly covered by acacia. The northern end of Lake Rukwa encompasses a wetland of papyrus and reed.

The grasslands are inhabited by a rich biodiversity of thousands of species and a rich variety of birds. It has a significant population of topi in particular and some groups of some 1500 have been reported in clusters in the valley. Estimates in the 1950s were that some 3000-4000 topi roamed the land around Lake Rukwa. The abundant grassland in the valley has been described a "mecca for grazers". Several mutations have been reported in the valley including an albino giraffe and a dark coloured zebra "marked with spots instead of stripes". Other game animals include eland, reedbuck, and buffalo. The valley is home to some rare animals, including poku and Shoebill. In 1939, A. Lea and Dirk van Velden Webb noted a relationship between locusts and the valley's grassland. Lake Rukwa, which has no outlet, contains a large crocodile population. The Uwanda Game Reserve, Rukwa Game Reserve and Lukwati Game Reserve are amongst the protected areas in the valley.

== Population ==
The Rukwa is sparsely populated, with an economy revolving around agriculture, cattle keeping and fishing. An important rice-producing area, the main crops are maize and paddy. Garden crops include beans, pumpkins, and sweet potatoes; bananas, mangoes, lemons, pineapples, sesame, and sugar cane are grown as well. There is an influx of Sukuma cattle. Human cases of anthrax was noted in 1985 to be a "persistent problem" stemming from cattle consumption.
