= Mambwe people =

Ethnic group from Zambia & Tanzania

Coordinates: 13.283°S 32.100°E

The Mambwe are an ethnic group from Mbala and Senga Hill district of Northeastern Zambia and Kalambo District of Rukwa Region, Tanzania. In 1987 the Mambwe population in Tanzania was estimated to number 63,000 . The number of Mambwe in Zambia has not been independently estimated, though the combined number of Mambwe and Lungu people in Zambia was estimated to be 262,800 in 1993 .

== History ==
=== Origins ===
Accounts of the history of the Mambwe people distinguish between the origin of the common people and that of their Chiefs. The common people of the Mambwe and the Lungu of Tafuna (but not those of Mukupa-Kaoma who are essentially bemba speakers) are part of the same ethnic group. According to Coxhead the two can hardly be distinguished. They migrated from north east Africa along with the Fipa, Namwanga and other Tanganikan peoples they are related to. The ruling line of the Mambwe is said to have been founded by a man called Changala who came from Kola and was a Mulua. Before he came the people did not know 'chiefs' (i.e. they had no central political authority) but instead lived under their clan heads. Changala settled in the south of Mambwe country in the area which acknowledged the authority of Chindo, the head of the Simwinga clan. Changala had with him two hunting leopards which Chindo had never seen before. Chindo was so impressed that he asked Changala to stay with him and provide meat for his people. In return Chindo offered to marry his daughter to Changala and to recognize him as Chief. Changala accepted this offer and agreed to settle there as Chief of the people. This marriage is said by the Mambwe to explain why the holder of the commoner title, Chindo, always addresses the holder of the senior royal title, Nsokolo, as son-in-law.

Changala is said to have also married women from the Sichilima and Simpemba clans. These three clans have a joking relationship with the royal clan, Sichula, and say that they 'gave Chiefs to the country' for it was from the women of these three clans whom Changala married that the present Mambwe Chiefs descended.

Changala, the founder of the Mambwe royal line, had a son called Mwimbe, who in turn had a son called Nsokolo wa Chisenga. The successors of this man have always assumed the title Nsokolo and with it the Mambwe paramountcy.

During the colonial period the main part of Mambwe country under Chief Nsokolo came under the external authority of Northern Rhodesia while the other came under Tanganyika, their Chief was Muti, a descendant of Funda, a brother of Nsokolo wa Chisenga.

=== Conflict with the Bemba ===
The Mambwe regarded the Bemba as their traditional enemies. They fought many bitters wars and suffered many raids. The Bemba were not only more numerous but they were more united under their paramount unlike the Mambwe.

One time, the Bemba had made war on a Mambwe chief called Chitongwe (Mphande V). Chitongwe's was a large village and not easily taken. The Bemba group led by Chitapankwa, Makasa and Mwamba, surrounded it, cutting access to the gardens and streams. The Bemba themselves were able to live off the land. After a month, the Mambwe were reduced to starvation; they were forced to live on rats, dogs and even the bark cloth in which babies were carried. At length they sent forth an emissary to arrange a surrender. The Mambwe were instructed to file out of the village through a single gate. As they came through the men were seized and slain and the women taken into captivity. Chitongwe himself was taken, his body cut up and the pieces put in a pot and boiled. In a later battle with the Bemba, the Mambwe killed two Bemba chiefs, Chilangwa and Mpangamina. Some time later Chtapankwa raised a large army and set off to maswepa in Mambwe country to seek vengeance. This time the Bemba lured the Mambwe out of their village and utterly routed them.

Though Nsokolo, was their paramount, the other Mambwe chiefs were never really under his authority. Chiefs of the main lineages had fought each other throughout history, and within lineages the chiefs had quarrelled. Musante Mpande II is said to have killed his two young brothers, Nsokolo II & III. They did not hesitate to seek outside help in their struggles with one another: Mphande joined the Ngoni when they invaded Mambwe territory and helped them to harry Nsokolo's district. Nsokolo in turn leagued himself with the Bemba and defeated both the Ngoni and Mphande.

Kela and other Mambwe Chiefs were repeatedly harassed by Bemba raiders in the 1880s and early 90s. The Mambwe indeed suffered, like the Tabwa and Lungu from disunity in the face of Bemba attacks: its even been suggested that the British 'may have saved the Mambwe from extinction as a people'. Nonetheless the Bemba were met with determined resistance from Kela and his relative Fwambo, who by 1885 had supplanted Nsokolo the nominal paramount, as the most powerful Mambwe Chief, Kela and Fwambo beat off repeated Bemba attacks on their stockaded villages. Another Mambwe Chief Mpenza seemed to have made some sort of alliance with the Bemba, but he failed to draw them into war with Fwambo in September 1889 and two months later Harry Johnson, a British explorer induced Fwambo and Mpenza to make peace. The Bemba were repulsed from Fwambo again in 1892 and Fwambo kept his impressive herds of cattle. In April 1893 a group of Chitimukulu Sampa's men were also beaten back from Nsokolo's neighborhood.

=== Arrival of the British ===
When the British arrived at Abercon(Mbala) in 1893, they found the Mambwe largely disrupted by internal politics. Chief Mphande and Chivuta had fled to the Senga for sanctuary, leaving many of their subjects under the rule of the Bemba chief Makasa. The then Nsokolo, Kimialile, was living with the Mambwe of what is now Tanzania, having sought refuge there after a defeat inflicted by the Bemba. Kamialile was blind, his younger brother Kosi had put out his eyes because he contemplated surrendering to the Bemba. The British though, began to use Kimialile as the principal administrative agent, and for the first time he found himself backed by a force sufficient to compel the other chiefs to recognize him as the main authority. The British wished to treat Nsokolo as a paramount chief, and to make him responsible for Mambwe affairs in general and for the conduct of the other chiefs. Thus the imposition of colonial rule on the Mambwe began a process of centralization of political authority. Disputes between chiefs seized to be settled by armed conflict, and internal order was enforced. In 1898 the British pacified the Bemba and established an administrative center at Kasama. This relieved the Mambwe of Bemba pressure. Chief Mphande returned to his own area and started working to recover his authority among his people.

== Descent System ==
Every Mambwe belongs to one of a large number of exogamous, dispersed, patrilineal clans, nearly all of which are prefixed by the syllable 'Si' (Father of) for males and 'Na' (Mother of) for females. The people say that they were clans before they were chiefs. The clan names represent, natural objects of the environment, manufactured objects but most are abstract objects with few equivalents in english. Many of these clan names are also found among the Lungu, Namwanga and Iwa. Some of the more common are; Sikazwe, Sichula (Frog, royal clan of the Mambwe), Sichilima (Cultivators), Simpemba (White clay), Simwinga (Hunters), Simpasa (Axe), Simutowe (Caterpillar), Simutami (to throw a stone at someone), Silavwe, Mwambazi, Sikasote, Sichivula, Simpungwe, Sinyangwe, Sinchangwa, Simfukwe, Sinjela, Sikapite, Simazuo, Simbao, Simukoko, Simbeya, Siluamba, Simpokolwe, Musukuma, Sinzumwa, Silungwe, Simunyola, Sikaumbwe and Simuyemba. A small number of these clans have an associated avoidance, the royal clan Sichula, avoids wild pigs, zebras and many small animals.

== Language ==
The Mambwe speak a Bantu language called Mambwe (Cimambwe), a dialect of Mambwe-Lungu.

== Culture ==
=== Music ===
The Mambwe have a traditional music piece consisting of a dance called Nsimba and musical instruments called Vingwengwe. They also have various artists such as; Kalambo hit parade, Solo Kalenge and Esther Namunga who perform Mambwe Lungu traditional music.

== Traditional Ceremony ==
=== Umutomolo ===
This is a traditional ceremony of the Mambwe and the Lungu of Tafuna, it is conducted to celebrate a successful harvest and to pray for rains for the next farming season. It takes place every last Saturday of June on the shores of lake Chila in Mbala. During the ceremony the wives of the Chiefs present samples of food grown in their chiefdom so that the Chiefs can bless them and give thanks to the ancestral spirits for a successful harvest. The Chiefs then taste the food and then the subjects are free to eat. The ceremony also involves traditional dances and music.

== Religious Beliefs ==
Most Mambwe people today are Christian, many of them Jehovah Witnesses or Catholic. Traditional Mambwe religion recognizes a supreme god called Leza, he created the earth and everything on it, but he is so remote from his creation that he is not concerned with the affairs of men and as such is never worshiped. Worship is directed to spirits of chiefly ancestors (imipasi yamwene yafwe). A shrine or temple called kavua was erected in each village, dedicated to the ancestors of local chiefs. Natural objects such as hills, caves, large rocks or permanent pools of water are divinized and referred to as mayao or maleza. These shrines are associated with ancestral spirits (imipasi) of local title holders. They are also arranged in a hierarchy of importance corresponding to the political status of the title holder. These land shrines are resorted to once a year in normal times and when crops have been harvested. Part of each crop is left at the shrine and the ancestral spirits are thanked. Apart from the annual harvest ceremony, the Chief and his people appeal to the shrines in times of disasters: drought, failure of crops, locust invasion, outbreak of disease and invasion of their country.

== Quotes about the Mambwe ==
"They tend to regard strangers with suspicion, an attitude justified by their past experiences. Though insular, they are hardy, resilient and cherish their independence that has been assailed so often in the past." William Watson
