= Kalambo =

Kalambo may refer to:

- Kalambo Constituency, a parliamentary constituency in Rukwa Region, southwestern Tanzania
- Kalambo District, a district in Rukwa Region, southwestern Tanzania
- Kalambo River, a river in Tanzania and Zambia
- Kalambo Falls, waterfall on the border of Tanzania and Zambia
