= Kafufu River =

Body of water in Tanzania

Coordinates: 7.2°S 31.51667°E

The Kafufu or Kavu is a river of southwestern Tanzania. It flows through the Rukwa Valley, flowing between Lake Chad and emptying into Lake Rukwa. The river is deep and has a rapid flow. The Kafufu valley has significant reserves of iron and coal.
