= Malangali, Sumbawanga =

Coordinates: 7.9716°S 31.5804°E

Malangali is a ward in the city of Sumbawanga in Rukwa Region, Tanzania. According to the 2002 census, the ward has a total population of 4,050.
