= Fipa language =

Bantu language spoken in Tanzania

Fipa
- Ichifipa
- Native to: Tanzania
- Ethnicity: Fipa people
- Native speakers: 200,000 (2002 census)
- Language family: Niger–Congo?: Atlantic–Congo; Benue–Congo; Bantoid; Bantu (Zone M); Rukwa; Mbozi; Mwika; Plateau; Fipa

Language codes
- ISO 639-3: fip
- Glottolog: fipa1238
- Guthrie code: M.13

Fipa (Fipa: Ichifipa) is a Bantu language of Tanzania. It is spoken by the Fipa people, who live on the Ufipa plateau in the Rukwa Region of South West Tanzania between Lake Tanganyika and Lake Rukwa. The ethnic group of the Fipa people is larger than the group of Fipa language speakers. On the Tanzanian side, people who speak Mambwe-Lungu may identify as Fipa and consider their language to be a dialect of Fipa.

== Area ==
Lungu and Mambwe are also spoken in Zambia where they are considered languages and their speakers are considered to be ethnic groups in their own right, although linguists consider Lungu and Mambwe to be dialects of a single language. There are three dialects: Milanzi (also referred to as IchiSukuuma), Kwa (Ichikwa) and Nkansi.

== Linguistic family ==
Maho (2009) classifies M.131 Kulwe (Kuulwe, no ISO code) as closest to Fipa. Otherwise the dialects are Milanzi (Fipa-Sukuma, Icisukuuma), South Fipa, Kandaasi (Icikandaasi), Siiwa (Icisiiwa), Nkwaamba (Icinkwaamba), Kwa (Icikwa), Kwaafi (Icikwaafi), Ntile (Icintile, Cile), Peemba (Icipeemba).
