= Andrew Vincent (footballer) =

Tanzanian footballer

Personal information
- Full name: Andrew Vincent Chikupe
- Date of birth: 22 April 1993 (age 33)
- Place of birth: Sumbawanga, Tanzania
- Height: 1.83 m (6 ft 0 in)
- Position: Defender

Team information
- Current team: Young Africans

Senior career*
Years	Team	Apps	(Gls)
2011–2015	Mtibwa Sugar		
2015–	Young Africans		

International career^{‡}
2016	Tanzania	2	(0)
- * Club domestic league appearances and goals as of 25 April 2021 ‡ National team caps and goals as of 25 April 2021

Andrew Vincent (born 22 April 1993) is a Tanzanian football defender who plays for Young Africans.
