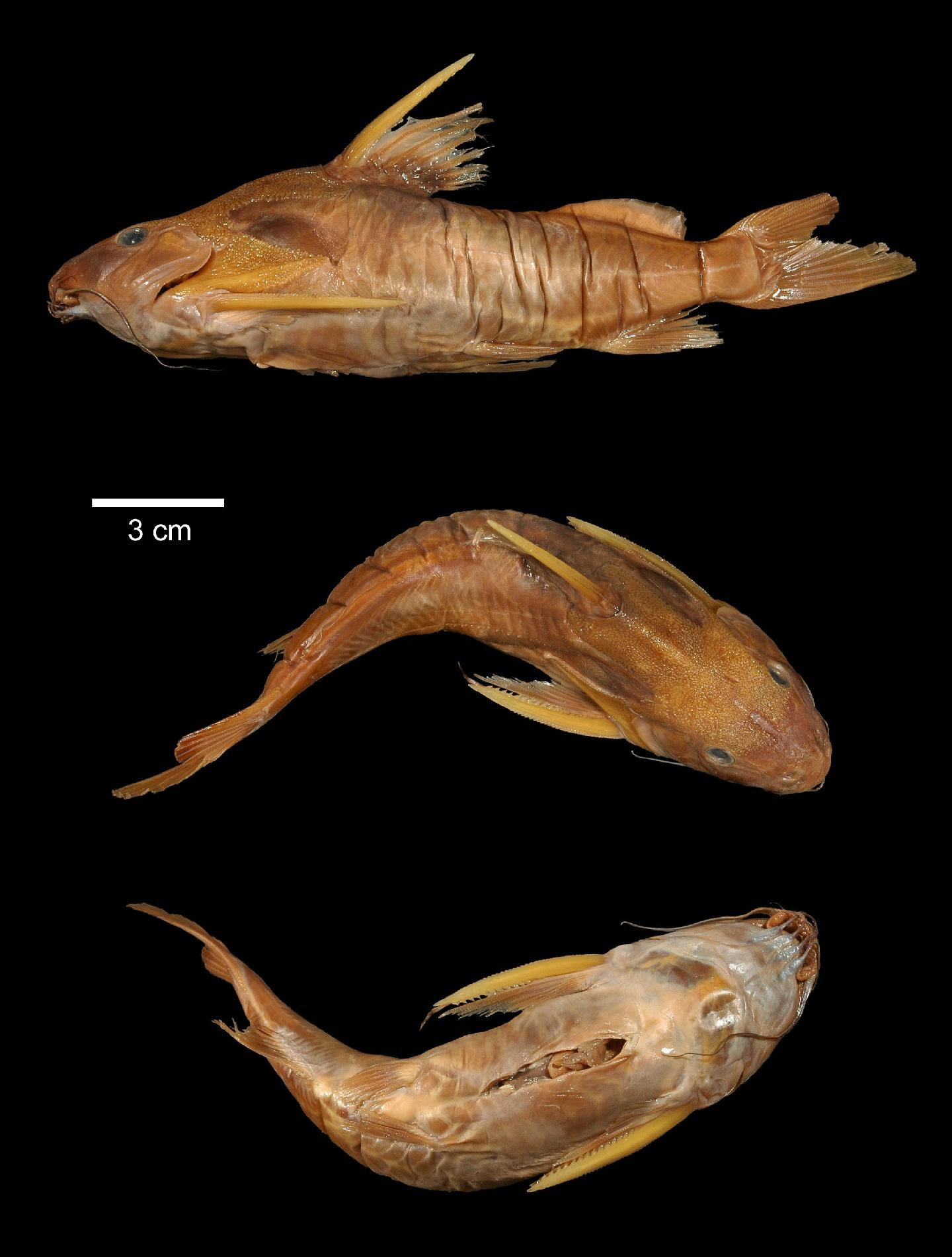

Conservation status
- Least Concern (IUCN 3.1)

Scientific classification
- Kingdom: Animalia
- Phylum: Chordata
- Class: Actinopterygii
- Order: Siluriformes
- Family: Mochokidae
- Genus: Synodontis
- Species: S. rukwaensis

Binomial name
- Synodontis rukwaensis Hilgendorf & Pappenheim, 1903

Synonyms
- Synodontis maculipinna Norman, 1922

= Lake Rukwa squeaker =

Species of fish

The Lake Rukwa squeaker (Synodontis rukwaensis) is a species of upside-down catfish found in the Lake Rukwa drainage in Tanzania. This species grows to a length of 29 centimetres (11 in) TL.
