= Magamba River =

River in Tanzania

Coordinates: 4.744751°S 38.285219°E

The Magamba is a river of southwestern Tanzania. It flows through the Rukwa Valley.
