= Lungu people =

Ethnic group from Zambia & Tanzania

The Lungu are a tribe of two Bantu ethnic groups i.e. the Lungu of Chief Tafuna (Mambwe-Lungu) and the Lungu of Chief Mukupa Kaoma (Malaila-Lungu). The Mambwe Lungu, who are the main focus of this article are located primarily on the southwestern shores of Lake Tanganyika in Rukwa Region's Kalambo District, Tanzania and northeastern Zambia mainly in Mpulungu and Mbala district. In 1987 the Lungu population in Tanzania was estimated to number 34,000. The number of Lungu in Zambia has not been independently estimated, though the combined number of Mambwe and Lungu in Zambia was estimated to be 262,800 in 1993.

== History ==
=== Origins ===
The Tafuna Dynasty together with that of Mukupa Kaoma and the Tabwa chiefly dynasties belong to the matrilineal Zimba (leopard) clan. The commoners under Tafuna, however, are patrilineal and have close affinities with the Mambwe, whereas the Malaila Lungu of Mukupa Kaoma are all matrilineal and have far more in common with the Bemba. The two main groups of Lungu have been distinct and separate throughout their brief remembered histories and there is no record of their collaborating in any common effort against the Bemba. An early British official once remarked "the Malaila Alungu are for all practical purposes Awemba, Tafuna's Lungu are sometimes referred to as Mambwe or Mambwe-Lungu".

==== Founding myth ====
According to the Sinyangwe family, the Lungu royal line of Chief Tafuna came from a land called Uzao, on the west of Lake Tanganyika in what is now eastern DR Congo. The people of this land were known as the Azao, led by a Chief Tandwe Lesa. They came as a group led by three royal women of the Azimba clan. Mukulu Kalwa married a Tabwa man to establish their chieftaincy of Nsama while Mukulu Munakile also known as Mukulu Lyanse married among the Malaila to establish the chieftaincy of Mukupa Kaoma and Chitoshi. The oldest of the sisters, Mukulu Mwenya, settled at Mbete along Lake Tanganyika in the present day Mpulungu District. She went on to marry into the Sinyangwe family, which it seems was the most dominant clan among the Lungu. She had a daughter called Chilombo, who married a man called Chitimbiti (Sikazwe), the two had a son called Ngolwe. In the late 1800s the Sinyangwe clan experienced a lot of unexplained deaths of which they accused their nephew Ngolwe of bewitching them. They also suspected him of having a sexual relationship with his aunt, the wife of one of his uncles, who was the head of the clan. As custom demanded, he drunk umwavi a deadly poison, so that if he died then he was deemed guilty but if he vomited and survived then he was innocent. After it was established that they wrongly accused him as he had vomited the poison and survived, as per custom he was to be given anything he demanded. After consulting with his father, he demanded the leadership of the clan and so became the first Chief Tafuna (Tafuna, from the word ukutafuna, to chew or to devour).

==== 19th-century history ====
In the late 19th century, there was much conflict among the Lungu who nominally accepted Tafuna's paramountcy. In the 1860s the minor Chief Chungu I, became Tafuna III, but he had difficulty maintaining his position at Isoko, the royal capital and by 1867 he had moved west to settle on the Lifubu river. Other Lungu Chiefs such as Kasonso, Chitimbwa and Chibwe seem to have been independent of Tafuna III. Soon afterwards, Tafuna III died, but his successor as holder of the Chungu title was more concerned to protect his country in the west against Bemba raiders than to move east and claim the Tafuna title. Instead in about 1870, another Lungu royal Kakungu, obtained help from Tippu Tip and in the face of local opposition set himself up at Isoko as Tafuna IV.

=== Wars with the Bemba ===
The Lungu, like the Mambwe lost a lot of their territory to the Bemba through warfare.

In 1872, Chitapankwa, the Bemba paramount, set out northwards to help the Fipa Chief of Lyangalile. While most of the Bemba force went on into Fipa country, Chitapankwa and his son Makasa IV were provoked by Zombe into attacking his village along the Lucheche river. They underestimated their opponent Zombe who held out under siege; he was eventually relieved by Chitimbwa and Kasonso: and together the Lungu Chiefs routed Chitapankwa. He fled, together with the Swahili, whom he had coerced to help him, leaving almost all their guns behind. The Lungu, for once united, the Bemba were not. Chitapankwa's elder brother Mwamba II had refused to join the campaign, and when he heard of the Bemba defeat, he was so shocked he threatened to rebel. Chitapankwa eventually avenged this humiliation. About ten years later, he recruited support from Makasa and Nkula. He then led the large force to Zombe's village. The Bemba's used a decoy with great success and inflicted a crushing defeat, they claim that Zombe was killed and his village razed to the ground.

Earlier in the 1860s, the Lungu were part of a large Ngoni led force along with the Mambwe, Inamwanga and Iwa that defeated the Bemba at Manga in which they killed Mukukamfumu Kasonde II, a sister of Chtapankwa's and captured her daughter Chimbabantu, Makasa himself had already fled.

In 1893, Chitimukulu Sampa along with Makasa led a joint expedition north into Lungu country. This was apparently an annual raid, which on this occasion was undertaken just after harvest when the prospects were best for plunder. The Bemba appear to have marched north as far as Lupembe, a Lungu village on the shores of lake Tanganyika. They then climbed eastwards to cross the Kalambo river above the falls and a little to the north of the frontier between the German and British spheres of influence. At this point, the Bemba encountered the imperial commissioner for German East Africa, Herman von Wissmann. Wissmann, who was directing an anti-slavery campaign between Lakes Malawi and Tanganyika had with him a force of two other officers and sixty trained soldiers; he also had a cannon and a Maxim gun. He was camped in a stockaded village of a Lungu headman Nondo. The Bemba force, which the Germans estimated at five thousand, now approached Nondo's village.

During the night of 6 July while the Germans kept watch within, the Bemba fired a few shots at Nondo's stockade, an act of provocation from which Makasa vainly tried to desuade Sampa. By the following morning, the Bemba had deployed several of their men around ant-hills no more than 50 yards from the stockade, most of these warriors had guns. Wissmann then engaged these vanguards in discussion. They explained through Wissmann's interpreter, that Sampa had no quarrel with the Germans if they promptly left Nondo's village; otherwise, the Bemba would attack both Lungu and Germans together. Wissmann refused to comply and warned the Bemba that it was a grave matter to do battle with Europeans. Meanwhile, his fellow officers, as also some of the Bemba began to show signs of impatience with this parley. The delay was well calculated however, as the great mass of Bemba continued to draw closer, they became more vulnerable to Wissmann's firepower. Nondo's councilor fired the first shot from the stockade, Wissmann hurled a grenade into a group of Bemba leaders; and the Germans and Lungu came out of the stockade with two big guns. The Maxim was used with devastating effect. Within a few minutes the Bemba were fleeing in disarray, leaving several dead and wounded. Abandoning their numerous captives and much other booty. The main Bemba force pursued its headlong flight, not halting until it reached the Bemba border, a four-day march away. Sampa himself got stuck in a marsh, and by the time he returned, his people had given him up for dead. The Germans heard that three of his sons had been killed.

=== British Rule ===
In 1889 the Lungu made treaties with the British through Chiefs; Tafuna, Chitimbwa and Chungu. The Mambwe did the same through Chief Fwambo and Chief Kela. As a result, they became part of the North-Eastern Rhodesia protectorate which eventually became part of Zambia. The rest of Lungu and Mambwe land is now part of Tanzania.

== Descent system ==
The Lungu are divided into a number of exogamous, dispersed patrilineal clans (Umwiko), nearly all of which are prefixed by the syllable 'Si' (Father of) for males and 'Na' (Mother of) for females. Some of the more common ones are; Sinyangwe, Sikazwe, Simuchenje, Silupya, Siulapwa, Sikatunga, Simfutata, Simuyemba, Sichilima, Sikasote and Chizu.

== Language ==
The Lungu speak a Bantu Language called Lungu (Cilungu), a dialect of Mambwe-Lungu.

== Culture ==
=== Music ===
The Lungu have a traditional music piece consisting of a dance called Nsimba and musical instruments called Vingwengwe. They also have various artists such as Kalambo Hit Parade, Solo Kalenge and Esther Namunga who perform Mambwe Lungu traditional music.

== Traditional ceremonies ==
=== Walamo ===
This is a traditional ceremony held to install Chief Tafuna. In olden days the designate Chief was required to cross the strip of water between lake Tanganyika and the sacred Mbita island while holding on to two canoes. If he survived the journey without being eaten by crocodiles or falling over and drowning, it meant he was approved by the ancestors. It was upon reaching the island that he would seek permission from the spirits Kapembwa, Mbita and Namukale to become leader of the Lungu people.

=== Umutomolo ===
This is a traditional ceremony of the Mambwe and the Lungu of Tafuna, it is conducted to celebrate a successful harvest and to pray for rains for the next farming season. It takes place every last Saturday of June on the shores of lake Chila in Mbala. During the ceremony the wives of the Chiefs present samples of foods grown in their chiefdom so that the Chiefs can bless them and give thanks to the ancestral spirits for a successful harvest. The Chiefs then taste the food and then the subjects are free to eat. The ceremony also involves traditional dances and music.

== Religious beliefs ==
The Lungu traditionally believe in a supreme god called Leza. He is remote from human affairs and as such he's not worshiped. The principal lesser divinity of Ulungu is called Kapembwa. Other ancestral spirits are Mbita, Namukale, etc.
