= Myakaliza River =

River in Tanzania

Coordinates: 7.36°S 31.728°E

The Myakaliza is a river of southwestern Tanzania. It flows through the Rukwa Valley.
