= Luhumuka River =

River in Tanzania

Coordinates: 8°1′50.12″S 32°0′26.91″E

The Luhumuka is a river of southwestern Tanzania. It flows through the Rukwa Valley.
