= Sumbawanga District =

District in Rukwa, Tanzania

Coordinates: 07°58′S 031°37′E

Sumbawanga Urban District
- District
- location in Rukwa Region
- Country: Tanzania
- Region: Rukwa Region

Area
  - Total: 1,374 km^{2} (531 sq mi)

Population (2022 census)
  - Total: 303,986
  - Density: 221.2/km^{2} (573.0/sq mi)

Sumbawanga Urban District is one of the four districts in the Rukwa Region of Tanzania. It is bordered to the north by Lake Rukwa, to the east by the Mbeya Region, to the south by the Sumbawanga Rural District and to the west by the Nkasi District. The district (and regional) capital is Sumbawanga.

According to the 2012 Tanzania National Census, the population of the Sumbawanga Urban District was 209,793.

== Wards ==
The Sumbawanga Urban District is administratively divided into fifteen wards:

1. Chanji
2. Izia
3. Kasense
4. Katandala
5. Kizwite/Chanji
6. Majengo
7. Malangali
8. Matanga
9. Mazwi
10. Milanzi
11. Mollo
12. Ntendo
13. Old Sumbawanga
14. Pito
15. Senga
