= Basimba clan names =

The Basimba people culture of naming their children, the way of their life, general custom and belief can be differentiated by way of a particular Basimba sub-division group or clan at a particular time.

Basimba (Big Lion) people refer to a network of families with their surnames, names of family, and history. It serves the Basimba people as a constant chant to remind them of histories they are tied to within their culture. Basimba people know a lot about a Musimba of a Basimba (Big Lion) particular group through his clan, and family names. This often allows for certain protocols to be followed. In the culture of Africa, when one comes upon someone with a certain Basimba Clan group name, you automatically know where they are from. The Basimba people's clan naming is a cultural science perfected by the Clan thousands of years ago. In the Basimba (Big Lion) people's culture, even individuals have totems. These totems may be related to something within their destinies, some historical event that they were a seminal part of, a call upon them by the spirits, the taking on of a new responsibility or title, or a wish by the Basimba people ancestors.

== Basimba (Big Lion) People Sub-divisions ==
Among the Basimba people, settlement sub-divisions were created called "new settlements" (Muwuluko). The connection is that the originator of a particular Basimba group was separated from the main body and built a new settlement.

These Basimba (Big Lion) people new settlements arose from various reasons, such as:

1. If a Musimba Clan member leaves his father's family and settles in a new area, but keeps contact with his father's family. The Basimba founder of a new settlement becomes, after several generations, its head and not the clan head, as he would be if he had severed all connections with his father's original home.
2. When a Basimba (Big Lion) people clan group grows too big, it is found practicable to divide the members into smaller family units for easier dealing with such matters as inheritance, maintenance of female descendants, etc. The senior member of each of these new subdivisions became the Muwuluko head.
3. If quarrels break out among the Basimba clan members and relatives take sides, each side constitutes itself as a sub-division with its senior member as its Muwuluko head, and either adopts a new totem.

== Totem ==
The Basimba people's primary and secondary totems are looked upon in entirely different lights. The primary totem is real taboo among the Basimba people, it may not be killed, eaten, touched and in some cases not even looked upon, but the secondary totem is a friendlier thing altogether. It is often described by the Basimba people as the brother of the clan . According to Hans Cory, the Omugurusi of the Basimba Dog totem Clan is Mauwe. On the day of his birth, a dog also had puppies. The dog often cleaned the child by licking it. Later, out of gratitude, Mauwe ordered his Basimba descendants to consider the dog their friend, and the dog became the clan's secondary totem.

The Basimba (Big Lion) people's clan system is central to their culture. A clan represents a group of people who can trace their lineage to a common ancestor, in some distant past. In the customs of the Basimba, lineage is passed down along patrilineal lines. The clan essentially forms a large extended family, and all members of a given clan regard each other as brothers and sisters, regardless of how far removed from one another in terms of actual blood ties.

The Basimba (Big Lion) people take great care to trace their ancestry through this clan structure. A formal introduction of a Musimba includes his or her own name, the names of his or her father and paternal grandfather, as well as a description of the family's lineage within the Basimba sub-division Clan group that he or she belongs to.

The clan has a social structure with the clan leader at the top (great lineal ancestor), followed by successive subdivisions of the lineal ancestors, and finally at the bottom, the individual family unit (house). Every Musimba is required to know where he falls within each of these subdivisions, and anyone who cannot relate his ancestry fully is suspected of not being a true Musimba.

The Basimba (Big Lion) people's sub-division Clans are not known by the names of the respective Clan founders. Totems were adopted by the seven Basimba Sub-division Clan groups, and the names of these totems came to be synonymous with the Basimba sub-division clans themselves. Each Basimba sub-division clan has a main totem and a secondary totem.

The seven Basimba sub-division Clan are usually known by their main totem similar to the Aboriginal Australians and among the Basimba people sub-division Clan group, the Ngo (Leopard) Clan is a royal Clan. The Nankanse, who have a leopard totem, say that when an elder of the clan is ... the leopard is an ancestor, and has already had a second funeral held for him.

The leopard totem is often associated with royalty and high chieftain (male and female). It is widespread in Africa as the symbol for the king. Many African kings are depicted sitting upon a leopard skin or resting their feet on the skin of the leopard. Some drape themselves in leopard skin, and you can see this all the way back to ancient Nubia.

The clan is a matter of genealogy, and it is through the clan that the Basimba (Big Lion) people trace their ancestry. A totem, on the other hand, is just a symbol to represent the Clan. Although the two are intimately associated with one another, they are in fact different. In the West, a totem would be similar to a coat of arms. The seven Basimba clan totems are the Lion, leopard, Leopard Cat, Genet Cat, dog, frog, and the rooster.

== Naming ==
One of the Basimba people's strongest manifestations of the four Clan spirits is in the traditional naming conventions. The Basimba (Big Lion) people are a patrimonialism society; everyone automatically takes on their father's clan at birth. However, the newborn child is considered to be a child of the whole Clan and not just the individual father.

A Musimba child does not assume the father's name. Instead, each of the seven Basimba clan has a pool of names from which a name is selected and given to the child. Since the Basimba people's clan names are well known, a person's clan is readily identified from their name, but not necessarily the person's parents. Each Basimba family has retained its autonomy as a unit; it is nonetheless considered part of the bigger clan family.

In Uganda at a place known as Butambala, there is a large rock called Nyakyejwe belonging to the Leopard (Ngo) Clan. Nyakyejwe was the daughter of Kabaka Kato Kintu who, so the story goes, grieved so much at his death. Much moisture exudes from the rock at times and causes green trails on its face, which are said to be Nyakyejwe weeping again, an Etiological myth.

This weeping is said to take place at the death of each Kabaka (King). At the same Butambala, there is also a kitchen chimney, cooking stones, a rock called Nabuto, her daughter, and under a nearby slab, a Leopard used to live and have its young ones. A Leopard is always seen at the said place from time to time and there is a hole containing water on this rock were the Basimba Leopard (Ngo) totem Clan or the Leopard (Ngo) Clan used to bring every new born baby child of the Leopard Clan to be bathed and given a Clan name.

The Basimba of the Leopard totem Clan genealogy, and descendants names given to their sons include Katunku, Ngulya, Mwati, Kaabya, Kitembwa, Kabolesa, Ntembe, Chanda, Namuyonjo, and Mukama. Daughters' names include Nakatunku, Namwati, Nangulya, Nakaabya, Nakitembwa, Nakabolesa, Nantembe, and Nachanda.

The sub-division name of the Basimba of the Dog totem Clan for men is Mauwe, among others. For the Basimba of the Frog Clan, men's names include Kadukulu, Ndanda, Bulukunyi, and Waida, and for women, Nakadukulu, Nandanda, Nabulukunyi, and Nawaida are among their sub-division clan names.

== Customs ==
The Basimba people's custom is that one is not supposed to marry into one's clan or that of one's mother. This type of system is referred to as being exogamy. Similarly, one is not supposed to eat the totem of one's clan, or of one's mother's clan.

The Basimba people have a Chishimba stone, which represents the Chishimba spirit, which came from Buluba and is related to the institution of kingship. Its absence constitutes the absence of power. According to Traditional African religions and Veneration of the dead, the Basimba people practice both totem and animal worship, dedicated to the Chishimba spirit, which is synonymous with kingship. Its importance in the institution of kingship is similar to that attached to the Shila tradition. The Chishimba stone is kept in a specially prepared basket called Embuga. It is wrapped with bark cloth and kept in a specifically prepared shrine (Esabbo lye jembe lye Chishimba) dedicated to the spirit.

Basimba people make periodic prayers at the Chishimba shrine for the peace and prosperity of the Clan. Before these prayers are offered the Basimba people draped themselves with a leopard skin sing, calling the spirits of their ancestors while holding one of the ancestors spear and then blood of an animal killed specifically for this purpose is sprinkled round the shrine with local beer as an invocation to the spirit, similar the Kongo influence called Petwo or Petro and many Loa or Lwa are of Kongo origin such as Basimba of Haiti who practice Haitian vodou sold as slaves.
