= Fipa people =

Ethnic group from Rukwa Region of Tanzania

Fipa
Wafipa

Total population
- 195,000

Regions with significant populations
- Tanzania: 195,000

Languages
- Fipa, Mambwe

Religion
- Christian (70%), Muslim (30%)

The Fipa (or Wafipa) are a Bantu ethno-linguistic group based in the Sumbawanga Rural and Nkasi districts of Rukwa Region in southwestern Tanzania speaking the Fipa and Mambwe languages. In 1992, the Fipa population was estimated to number 200,000, reduced to 195,000 in the 2002 census.

== History ==
=== Dynastic history ===
Historically, the Fipa lived on the largely treeless Ufipa Plateau looking down on Lake Tanganyika, appearing as a bridge joining east to central Africa and the Congo. They were a mixed population – Fipa, Wanda, and Nyika – with roughly 20,000 people in the 1890s. Many had come from the Congo, with chiefdoms dominating a number of clans. Since iron was a precious commodity, and iron smelting required technical knowledge, it was jealously guarded, resulting in a number of clans being subject to ironsmiths. The central chiefdom, Milanzi ("the eternal village"), was headed by a dynasty of ironsmiths, which exchanged its products for woven cloth.

These clans and dynasties were later taken over by an even newer immigrant group, who were organized as a single clan and dominated others by force and cunning. While the Twa established themselves as an aristocracy, the older Milansi dynasty retained ritual power and the right to install the Twa chief. It was, however, the Twa (after splitting into two chiefdoms) who exercised territorial and administrative authority through their appointed officials, with orders then transmitted to elected village headmen. The Fipa had now finally become more stratified, had even more precise borders, and were governed in a more strictly supervised manner. It had become a real state.

==== Nkansi ====
Nkansi (Nkasi), on the Ufipa Plateau, was a chiefdom with a particularly extreme and elaborate form of political organization, even having a prime minister, and according to some, had a life comparable to peasantry in the richest of European countries. It became traditional to have hereditary chiefs who were surrounded by a court of at least nine titled officials and others to administer specific areas of the chiefdom.

The Queen Mother was also important, having her own separate palace and court, a large estate that paid her tribute. On the lowest administrative level was an elected village headman with a female magistrate whose special function was to decide breaches of the public order by either sex, particularly in regards to the use of obscene language and brawling.

The judiciary could also be elaborate. Cases were first heard by a headman; from there a defendant could appeal to the district sub-chief, then to the royal court, and finally to the chief, queen mother, and council of elders. If a person were found guilty of murder, the murderer was ordered to give a man (or woman, if a woman had been killed) to the family of the murdered person. If there was no one to give, the murderer was told to choose between death and becoming a slave to the murdered person's family. If the murderer became a slave, his family could ransom him. Their readiness to do so was expressed by the gift of a hoe, and an agreement was reached in front of the royal court. Only the chief could impose the death penalty, which was carried out immediately by poison, spearing, or decapitation.

=== 19th-century history ===
Until the 1860s, the Wafipa were described as still peaceful and prosperous, although somewhat plagued by raiders. By the 1870s, however, warriors were now carrying Wahehe-style hide shields and spears. The villages had become palisaded, and slowly chaos, terror, and warfare began to dominate the area, primarily as a result of the private army of Kimaurunga (Kimalaunga).

The rulers of Ufipa, from 1860 to 1890, made alliances with coastal traders, and the state experienced stability and outward prosperity. On entering Ufipa, a visitor paid a small tribute and then became the chief's guest. Each village provided the visitor with accommodations and carried his load to the next settlement. The Fipa were not aggressive, were said never to wage war, but generally obtained enough firearms to deter most potential aggressors by exchanging their grain for slaves, with which they then bought guns from the coastal traders. The German explorer Paul Reichard, who visited the Ufipa around 1882, said that "calm, peace and order" reigned within the Fipa state. He described the rule of King Kapuufi as "generally energetic, but nevertheless mild".

Below the surface, however, there were a number of destructive consequences. The local weaving industry declined, while the Twa chiefs were able to enforce much heavier contributions in goods, livestock, and labor from their subjects. In place of cotton, beads, and wire being exchanged, there were guns and powder going into the interior to trade for human beings. In 1889–1890, British explorer H. H. Johnston wrote of the Ufipa area: "I...have seen all human life and culture stamped out for a distance of 50 miles along the road, where only a short time before the most flourishing villages existed."

=== Contact with Europeans ===
Prophet Kaswa is said to have prophesied the coming of Europeans: "There are coming terrible strangers who bring war; they will surely come. O you people, you are going to be robbed of your country: you will not even be able to cough." It was not until 1905–1919 that the Wafipa began seeking employment with Europeans.

== Traditional society ==
=== Settlements ===
The Wafipa tended to live in concentrated, widely spaced settlements of 20–30 round huts, no more than a few yards apart, each housing three to five each, with two surrounding corridor walls for small livestock. An inner room was for eating and sleeping. Reed mats for sleeping and filtering beer were made by the women, who also used a small hoe when working the fields. Men also made the beds: a single cow hide, or cow hide strips, stretched over a wooden frame with a reed mat placed on the bed before sleeping in it. A total of 100 people in a village were normal; 300–400 people were large and not common. Everyone wore durable cotton cloth of black and white stripes of six by five feet. It took four to five hours to cover the eight-to-nine miles between settlements. Within the settlements, there was a strong emphasis placed on communal values, the most important being sociability.

Almost all of East Africa's people viewed forests and fields to be at least somewhat antagonistic. There was hostility between cultivated land and the wildness of the bush. The Fipa in particular saw the bush as full of dangers and stressed the village as properly dominant over the surrounding bush. With the Wafipa, each spirit cult was associated with rocks, mountain, groves, and lakes, and had a shrine where a priest tended a sacred python whose domestication represented man's control over nature.

=== Land ===
The Ufipa Plateau was deforested and the soil exhausted. The Fipa planted their principal crops on earth-covered compost piles of vegetation roughly a mile or more from a settlement. Thompson wrote: "They are more of a purely agricultural race than any other tribe I have seen. To the cultivation of their fields they devote themselves entirely." During the busy time of harvest, those working the land built round huts in which to sleep and find shelter. The main crop was millet, to be made into dry porridge and usually eaten with the fingers accompanied by beans.

Traditionally, all land belonged to the chief. Any Fipa could plant wherever they wished, as long as payment was made to the local official. While there was no shortage of land itself, there was a shortage of fertile land, and distances between settlements tended to increase. Fishing was supposed to be important in the area of Lake Rukwa (although the Germans make no mention of fish products found in Kimaurunga's Boma), Lake Tanganyika, and the surrounding rivers.

=== Gender roles ===
The most important tasks for the men were hunting wild animals, building huts and granaries, collecting firewood, making and spreading compost piles, cutting grass, and threshing millet. The threshing was often done by cooperative groups of kinsmen and neighbors.

The women's most important tasks were drawing water, weeding, cooking, plastering huts and granaries, winnowing, pounding grain, sweeping huts, using the coil method to make pottery, and raising children.

=== Industry ===
Ironsmiths were hereditary specialists. The knowledge was integrated with magic and a special bag of magical ingredients was passed from father to son. The Twa chiefs of the Wafipa, any of his family, and all women were forbidden to visit the site of a kiln or forge, while all other visitors had to acknowledge the smith's authority with a payment. The smith and his assistants were supposed to abstain from sexual intercourse, for the smelting and forging of ironwork was a very specialized craft totally bound up with knowledge and magic, using very particular ingredients from doctors and sorcerers.

Spinning and weaving locally grown cotton was widespread and was done by men. The cloth was white with a black-striped border, about five by six feet, and was worn as a toga-like garment by both men and women.

=== Birth, life, and death ===
Aside from extracting two or four lower incisors before or after puberty, the Wafipa had no initiation ceremony for either sex. It was general practice among unmarried girls to extend their labia minora by constant manipulation. This was thought to enhance their sexual attractiveness and favor giving birth. If a birth was difficult, the midwives asked the name of the unborn child's father, for it was thought that unconfessed adultery could cause death in childbirth. At the birth of a girl, the father brought firewood on his head; when a boy was born, a bow and arrow was carried in the father's right hand. Following death, a meeting of kin decided the issue of inheritance and a widow was assigned to the heir, if she was willing.

If a woman died in childbirth, the unborn child was cut from the belly and placed on its dead mother's back inside the grave, while the women would weep and chant inside the hut with the corpse; the men would sit quietly outside. Following the burial, the hut in which the woman died was totally destroyed. The dead were not "thrown away", Sangu-style.

=== Worship ===
Fipa diviners blamed illness on sorcery, territorial or ancestral spirits, or a neighbor or relative. Commoners tended to blame sorcery alone. Illness made it necessary to discover its cause: an ancestral spirit, a divinity, a demon, a sorcerer, or even a witch (Fipa witches were supposed to be carried upside down at night by their wives, work evil, and be all that was opposite of being good), for only with the discovery of the cause could appropriate measures be taken, such as sacrifices, ritual burning, or certain medicines, etc.

The Wafipa, as with most Africans, had a supreme god: Umweele, the creator of ultimate power in the world. There was, however, no cult to this god, although it was common for those needing help to utter "Umweele, forgive me". Worship was also directed to lesser and closer divinities, the most important and terrible being Katai, said to be the enemy of domestic animals and the bringer of smallpox and other diseases. Katai could come as a dog with shining eyes, in dreams; a mouse in a hut corner; a beautiful youth; or even smoke (the African concept of deities included the souls of animals, spirits, and humans being interchangeable).

When an epidemic occurred, dances were forbidden, children ceased playing noisy games, and water-pots were covered. Katai could, when s/he was in a kindly mood, also cure illness and heal suffering. When Katai was in an evil-minded mood, s/he could be appealed to for revenge or spite. There was no agreement on the sex of Katai: in the north it was male, in the south, female.

There were other, more localized spirits. Hills, lakes (such as Lake Tanganyika), large trees, oddly shaped rocks, groves of trees, could all be the home of a spirit. Truly large tame pythons, representing the spirits of these places, would coil themselves on specially made stools and receive offerings of millet porridge and meat from worshipers. Worship was often conducted by a hereditary priest, often seemingly possessed of a particular spirit.

Lastly, there was the worship of ancestral spirits. These were thought to inhabit the threshold of their descendants' huts. Periodically, the owner of a hut would honor them by sprinkling the walls and floors with water and flour.

Twins were considered divinities, having special powers over rain and crops. They could also cause epidemics. They were publicly acclaimed, being carried around the village on a tray, and sacrifices were communally held in their honor at the new moon. They were not killed or allowed to die through starvation as with so many other groups. They were in fact so important as to be especially honored by having sacrifices offered at an altar erected by their parents outside their hut during harvest time or epidemics.
