= Ambala River =

River in Tanzania

Coordinates: 08°01′50″S 32°00′27″E

The Ambala is a river of southwestern Tanzania. It flows through the Rukwa Valley.
