= Kalambo River =

River in Rukwa Region, Tanzania and Mbala District, Zambia

Coordinates: 8°24′S 31°18′E

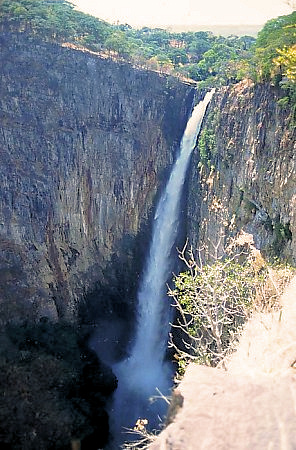
- Kalambo Falls

Location
- Country: Rukwa Region, Tanzania
- Country: Northern Province, Zambia

Physical characteristics
- Source: Ufipa Plateau
  - location: Zambia
  - elevation: 1,800 m (5,900 ft)
- Mouth: Lake Tanganyika
  - location: Tanzania
  - elevation: 770 m (2,530 ft)
- Length: 50 km (31 mi)

The Kalambo River forms part of the border between Zambia and Tanzania. It is a comparatively small stream which rises on the Ufipa Plateau in Rukwa Region, Tanzania north-east of Mbala at an elevation of about 1,800 metres (5,900 ft) and descends into the Albertine Rift, entering the southeastern end of Lake Tanganyika at an elevation of about 770 metres (2,530 ft), in a straight-line distance of only about 50 kilometres (31 mi). This accounts for its main claim to fame, its waterfall, Kalambo Falls, which is Africa's second highest falls (after South Africa's Tugela Falls). Below the falls, the river runs in a deep gorge.

The site of the river includes important archaeological sites.
