= Ufipa Plateau =

- Location within Tanzania

Highest point
- Peak: Mbizi
- Elevation: 2,490 m (8,170 ft)
- Coordinates: 8.11437°S 31.54685°E

Geography
- Country: Tanzania
- Regions: Rukwa and Songwe

The Ufipa Plateau is a highland in southwestern Tanzania. It lies mostly in Rukwa Region, near the border with Zambia. The plateau is named for the Fipa people who inhabit it.

== Geography ==
The plateau extends northwest–southeast, rising between two segments of the East African Rift. Lake Tanganyika (lake surface 773 m elevation) lies to the southwest in the western branch of the rift, and the graben valley of Lake Rukwa (lake surface 793 meters elevation) lies to the northeast. The plateau rises in steep escarpments above both lake valleys, and includes extensive areas above 2000 meters elevation. Mbizi (2490 m) is the highest peak, northeast of Sumbwawanga the edge of the escarpment overlooking Lake Rukwa. Malonje (2418 m) lies south of Mbizi.

Most of the plateau lies in the closed drainage basin of Lake Rukwa. The southeastern portion of the plateau is drained by the Momba River and its tributaries, and the northeastern portion is drained by tributaries of the Rungwa River; both rivers empty into Lake Rukwa. The western edge of the plateau drains into Lake Tangankyika. The Kalambo River drains the central plateau, and forms Kalambo Falls as it descends the escarpment towards Lake Tanganyika. The plateau has some wetland areas, including the Kale Swamp.

Cities on the plateau include Sumbawanga, near the center of the plateau, and Namanyere in the northwest.

== Ecology ==
The natural vegetation on most of the plateau is miombo woodland. The Mbizi Forest Reserve (17,373 ha) and the Lyambo Hill Forest Reserve (212.39 km^{2}) protect an enclave of montane rainforest on the slopes of Mount Mbizi, and montane grasslands at the summit. The Mbizi forest supports a population of Ugandan red colobus monkeys (Procolobus tephrosceles).

There are a chain of protected areas along the western escarpment, including Kalambo Falls Forest Reserve (5.63 km^{2}), Kalambo River Forest Reserve (461.63 km^{2}), Loasi River Forest Reserve (354.81 km^{2}), and Lwafi-Nkamba Game Reserve (3388.57 km^{2}).

== Transport ==
The plateau is crossed by two major roads. Tanzania's M8 highway extends from Mpanda to Sumbawanga, and then south to Mbala in Zambia. Sections of the M8 are unpaved. The Tunduma-Sumbawanga Road extends southeast from Sumbawanga to Tunduma on the Zambian border, where it meets the A104 highway and the TAZARA Railway.
