= Sumbawanga =

Capital of Rukwa Region, Tanzania

- City of Rukwa Region
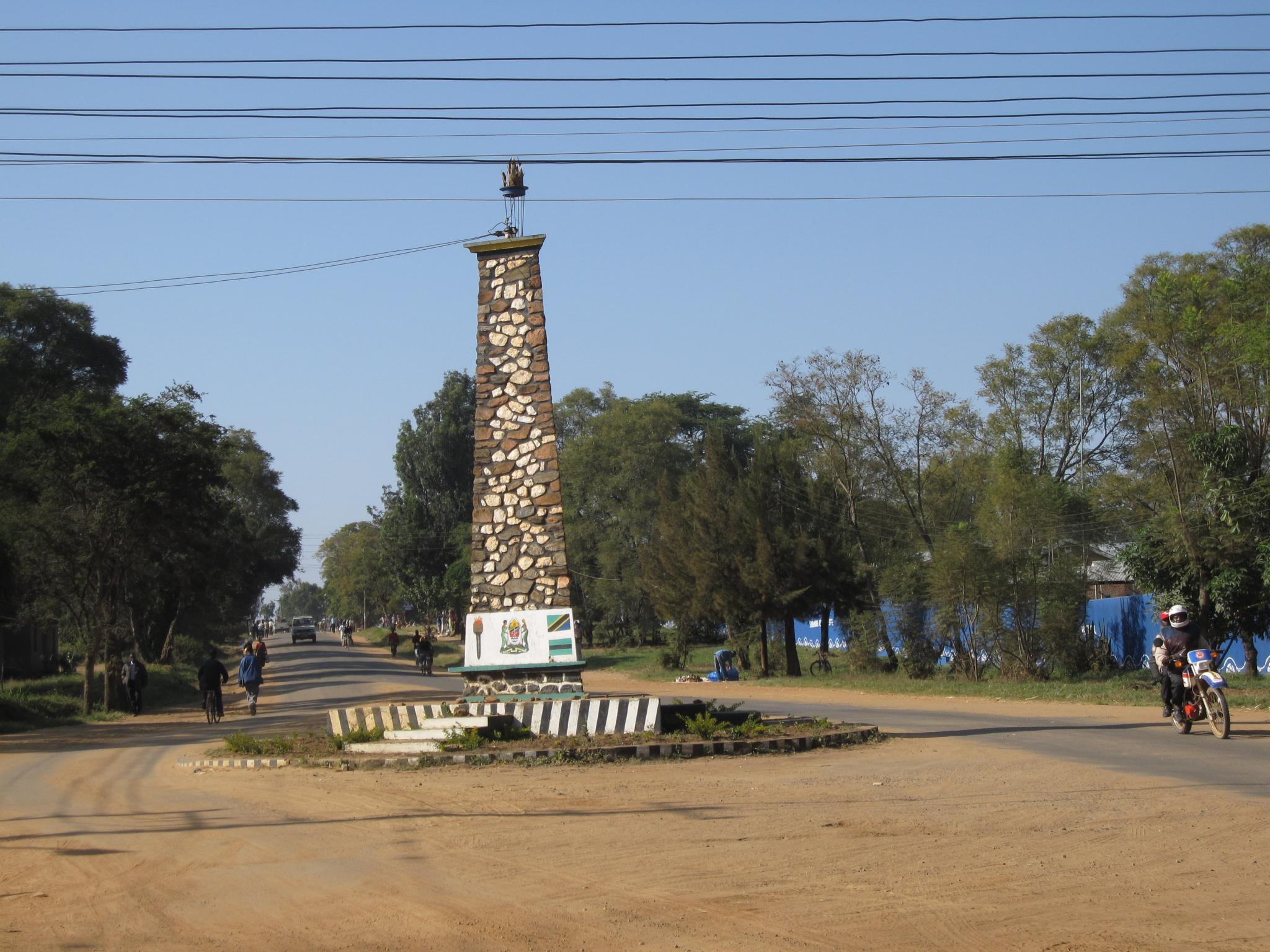
- The Sumbawanga Memorial.

- Location of Sumbawanga. Sumbawanga (Africa) Sumbawanga (Tanzania)
- Coordinates: 7°58′S 31°37′E
- Country: Tanzania
- Region: Rukwa Region
- District: Sumbawanga Urban

Population (2022 census)
  - Urban: 303,986
- Postal code: 55100
- Climate: Cwb
- Website: Regional website

Sumbawanga is a city located in western Tanzania. It is the capital of Rukwa Region and the municipal seat of Sumbawanga Urban District with postcode number 55100 . The district had a population of approximately 303,986 based on the 2022 census. Sumbawanga lies in the territory of the Wafipa Fipa tribe and so many people speak Kifipa, as well as Kiswahili, the most widely used language of Tanzania. The name of the town literally translates as "throw away your witchcraft", thought to be a warning from local spiritual "healers" to any bringing in superstitions and practices relating to spiritual healers from other areas. Until the 1980s approximately, Sumbawanga was a place where many witch doctors were located. Though fewer in numbers, there are still some healers who practice both in town and in the surrounding smaller villages on the plateau. The town has the largest hospital in the region, Rukwa General Hospital, which is government funded, as well as the smaller Dr. Atiman Hospital administrated and run by the Catholic Diocese of Sumbawanga.

The town acts as a supply and commercial center for the Rukwa Region and some governmental agencies are to be found there, notably the transport department for the region. Sumbawanga has both Libori and Moravian conference centres. A modest-size market is in the town centre where local produce may be found. This includes maize, rice, fruit, poultry and fish (from Lake Tanganyika and Lake Rukwa). Many imported plastic goods and electronics are available as well as bicycles and spares. Although there are several fuel outlets, supply can be quite erratic because of the difficulties of transport from the coast.

The local economy is largely dependent on agriculture and small locally owned businesses. There is very limited industry or production in the town. Significant improvement has been made on the road to Mbeya as it is sealed to enable reliable all-weather access year round. This road, and its continuation north to Mpanda and Tabora or Kigoma, is now passable throughout the year. The Tanzanian government has had contracts in place for upgrading large sections of these roads. The town can be reached by flights operated by Auric Air or by bus from Mbeya which lies to the south with train links to the town of Kapiri Mposhi in Zambia, to Dar es Salaam. Rail is also available through Tabora from Mpanda in the north. Mpanda also has an airport with a 2 km sealed runway.

== Education ==
Sumbawanga has many schools and colleges, including:

1. Chem Chem Secondary School
2. Sumbawanga Secondary School
3. St. Aggrey Chanji High School
4. Mazwi Secondary School
5. St. Aggrey Teaching College
6. Musoma Utalii College
7. Chem Chem Teaching College
8. Kanda Secondary School
9. Mafulala Secondary School
10. Msakila Secondary School
11. St.Mary's Colledge

== Climate ==
Climate data for Sumbawanga (1991-2020, extremes 1989-present)
Month	Jan	Feb	Mar	Apr	May	Jun	Jul	Aug	Sep	Oct	Nov	Dec	Year
Record high °C (°F)	30.0 (86.0)	34.4 (93.9)	29.0 (84.2)	30.0 (86.0)	32.0 (89.6)	29.0 (84.2)	29.7 (85.5)	31.7 (89.1)	30.1 (86.2)	33.0 (91.4)	32.0 (89.6)	32.0 (89.6)	34.4 (93.9)
Mean daily maximum °C (°F)	23.3 (73.9)	23.8 (74.8)	24.0 (75.2)	23.8 (74.8)	24.2 (75.6)	24.1 (75.4)	23.9 (75.0)	24.9 (76.8)	26.1 (79.0)	26.5 (79.7)	25.3 (77.5)	23.8 (74.8)	24.5 (76.1)
Mean daily minimum °C (°F)	14.4 (57.9)	14.2 (57.6)	14.2 (57.6)	14.0 (57.2)	12.0 (53.6)	9.3 (48.7)	8.6 (47.5)	10.0 (50.0)	12.5 (54.5)	14.5 (58.1)	14.9 (58.8)	14.6 (58.3)	12.8 (55.0)
Record low °C (°F)	9.9 (49.8)	9.1 (48.4)	10.3 (50.5)	8.4 (47.1)	6.4 (43.5)	4.7 (40.5)	3.2 (37.8)	1.6 (34.9)	6.5 (43.7)	9.0 (48.2)	5.9 (42.6)	8.4 (47.1)	1.6 (34.9)
Average precipitation mm (inches)	178.2 (7.02)	134.1 (5.28)	142.6 (5.61)	85.1 (3.35)	17.5 (0.69)	2.0 (0.08)	0.7 (0.03)	1.6 (0.06)	3.1 (0.12)	9.6 (0.38)	81.4 (3.20)	197.2 (7.76)	853.1 (33.59)
Average precipitation days (≥ 1 mm)	17.5	13.8	14.4	8.5	2.2	0.3	0.1	0.3	0.4	1.7	7.2	17.3	83.7
Source: NOAA

== Twin Town/Sister City ==
- Tifariti, Western Sahara

== In popular culture ==
- The town was included on the route taken by Ewan McGregor and Charlie Boorman on their 15,000 mile north to south Long Way Down motorcycle adventure in July 2007.
