= Uwanda Game Reserve =

Protected area of Katavi Region

Coordinates: 8.030589°S 32.007475°E

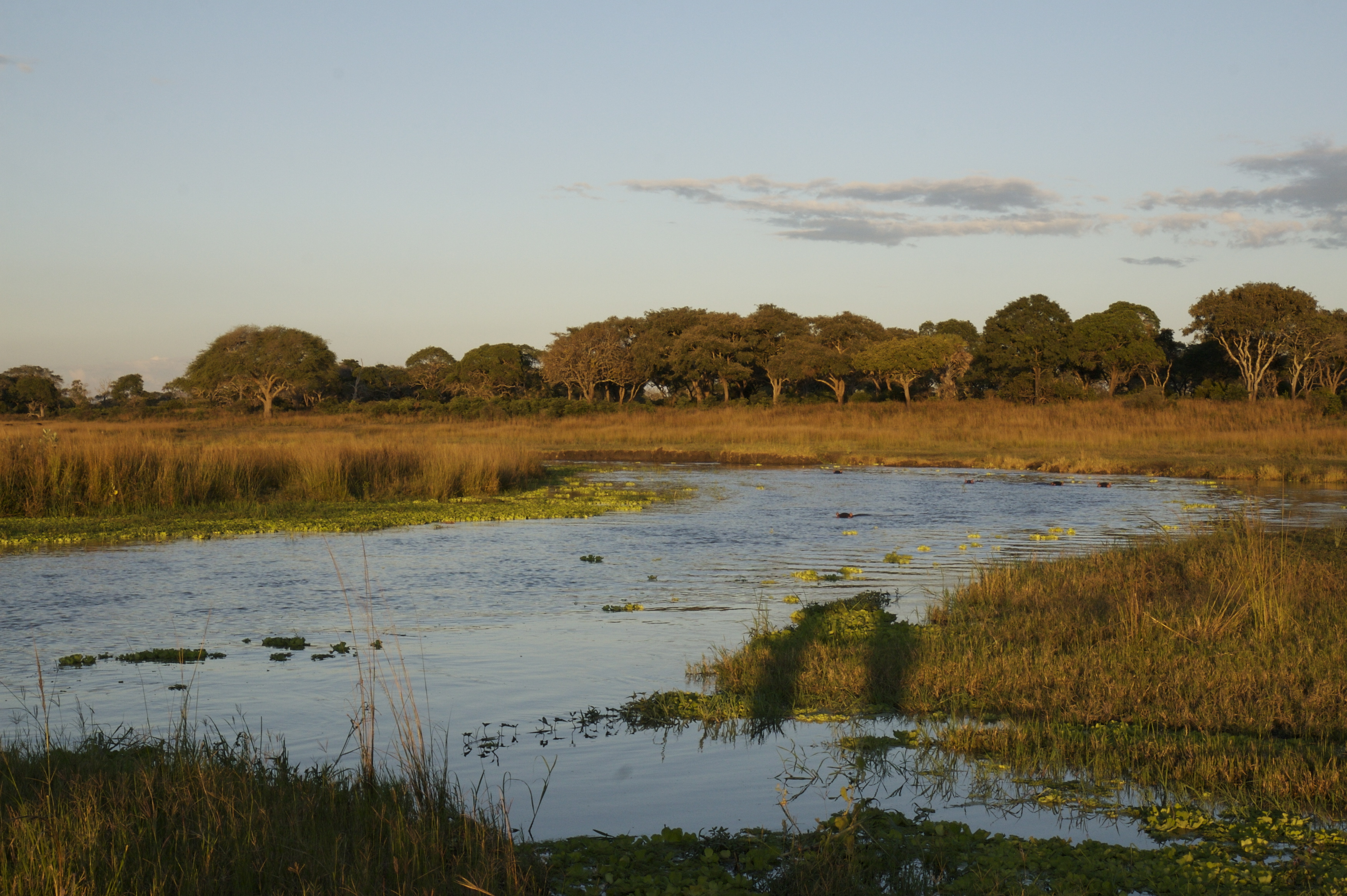
Image of Katavi during evening

Uwanda Game Reserve, also known as Uwanda Rukwa Game Reserve, (Hifadhi ya Akiba ya Uwanda, in Swahili) is a game reserve of Tanzania located in Rukwa Valley of southwestern Tanzania. It is an extension of Katavi National Park and covers an area of 4100 square kilometres. It includes almost half of Lake Rukwa. This reserve was established in 1971.

Over 400 species of birds have been recorded in the reserve.
