= Sumbawanga Rural District =

Coordinates: 8.417°S 31.617°E

Sumbawanga
- District
- location in Rukwa Region
- Country: Tanzania
- Region: Rukwa Region

Area
  - Total: 5,150 km^{2} (1,990 sq mi)

Population (2022)
  - Total: 494,330
  - Density: 96.0/km^{2} (249/sq mi)

Sumbawanga Rural District is one of three districts of the Rukwa Region of Tanzania. It is bordered to the northeast by the Sumbawanga Urban District, to the south by Zambia and to the northwest by the Nkasi District.

According to the 2022 Tanzania National Census, the population of the Sumbawanga Rural District was 494,330.

== Wards ==
The Sumbawanga Rural District is administratively divided into twenty-three wards:

- Kaengesa
- Kalambazite
- Kaoze
- Kasanga
- Katazi
- Kipeta
- Laela
- Legezamwendo
- Lusaka
- Mambwekenya
- Mambwenkoswe
- Matai
- Miangalua
- Milepa
- Mkowe
- Mpui
- Msanzi
- Mtowisa
- Muze
- Mwazye
- Mwimbi
- Sandalula
- Sopa
