= Nkasi District =

Coordinates: 7.583°S 31.000°E

Nkasi
- District
- location in Rukwa Region
- Country: Tanzania
- Region: Rukwa Region

Area
  - Total: 9,824 km^{2} (3,793 sq mi)

Population (2022)
  - Total: 425,420
  - Density: 43.30/km^{2} (112.2/sq mi)

Nkasi District (formerly Nkansi District) is one of the three districts of the Rukwa Region of Tanzania, with its headquarters in the village of Namanyere. It is bordered to the north by the Mpanda District of Katavi Region; to the east by the Sumbawanga District; to the south by the Sumbawanga Rural District and Zambia; and to the west by Lake Tanganyika across from the Democratic Republic of Congo.

The district covers 13,124 square kilometres (5,067 sq mi). As of 2022, the population of the Nkasi District was 425,420.

== History ==
Nkasi District was established on 1 January 1984.

== Economy ==
Nkasi District is almost entirely rural, with well over 90% of its population undertaking subsistence farming, livestock rearing, and traditional fishing. Thirty-three of the villages in the district are located beside Lake Tanganyika. Major crops include: maize, millet, beans, and cassava. Commercial fishing in Lake Tanganyika is limited due to lack of storage facilities as well as capital to acquire fishing gear.

== Administrative subdivisions ==
As of 2002, Nkasi District was administratively divided into thirteen wards. After the 2012 reorganization it had seventeen wards.

=== 2002 wards ===
- Chala
- Isale
- Kabwe
- Kala
- Kate
- Kipande
- Kirando
- Mkwamba
- Mtenga
- Namanyere
- Ninde
- Sintali
- Wampembe

=== 2012 wards ===
- Chala
- Isale
- Kabwe
- Kala
- Kate
- Kipande
- Kipili
- Kirando
- Korongwe
- Mkwamba
- Mtenga
- Namanyere
- Ninde
- Nkandasi
- Nkomolo
- Sintali
- Wampembe
