= Gideon Were =

Kenyan professor

Gideon Saulo Were (27 October 1934 – 7 July 1995) was a Kenyan professor of history, author, publisher, administrator and entrepreneur. He was born in Marama location of Kakamega, Kenya. His father, Saulo Omukofu, was an educationist and a prominent member of the North Nyanza District Appeal Court.

== Early life and education and early career ==
Were was born on 27 October 1934. He attended Kakamega, and Maseno High Schools, from 1950 to 1956, before joining the Royal Technical College in Nairobi (now University of Nairobi) from 1957 to 1959 where he obtained a Bachelor of Arts degree in History. He then proceeded to University of Wales, where he earned a PhD graduating summa cum laude in 1966.

== Family ==
Were married Naomi Ayitso Were, and they have seven children: Saulo Omukofu Were, Abisage Wanzetse Ouma, Evaline Aoko Tiondi, Christina Masakha Were, Peres Wamukhula Were, Isaya Okoti, and Walter Omucheyi Were

== Career ==
Upon completing his studies, Professor Were returned to Kenya and was appointed a Special Lecturer in the Department of History at University of Nairobi. He then rose through the ranks to become a Senior lecturer in 1970, Associate Professor in 1973 and in 1978 he was promoted to a full Professor of history.

== Positions held ==
- Acting chairperson of the Department of History 1973–1974
- Dean of Faculty of Arts 1974–1978
- Chair of Postgraduate Committee of University Senate 1974–1978
- Director of Institute of African Studies, 1985–1990

Board member/director:

1. Kenya National Assurance
2. Nairobi Primary School
3. Kenya High School

== Businesses ==
- Gideon S. Were Press, Nairobi, Kenya
- Star Academy, Kakamega, Kenya (Primary Boarding School)
- Were Enterprises, Kakamega, Kenya

=== Publications ===
Were authored and co-authored the following publications his career:

1. East Africa Through A Thousand Years: A History Of The Years AD 1000 To The Present Day, (with Derek A. Wilson) London: Evans Brothers 1968 344p. (Revised editions 1972, 1984)
2. A History of the Abaluyia of Western Kenya: C.1500–1930. Nairobi: East African Publishing House, (1967, 206p.)
3. Western Kenya Historical Texts: Abaluyia, Teso and Elgon Kalenjin, Nairobi: East African Literature Bureau, 1967, 196p.
4. Essays On The History Of South-Central Africa (with M.A. Ogutu) Nairobi: Kenya Literature Bureau
5. A History of South Africa, London: Evans Brothers, 1974, 198p. (Revised Edition 1983)
6. Essays on African Religion in Western Kenya. Nairobi: East African Literature Bureau, 1977\
7. Woman and Development in Africa, (Spec. Issue of "JEAR&D" Vol. 15). (edited). Nairobi: Gideon S. Were Press, 1985
8. History, Public Morality and Nation-Building: A Survey Of Africa Since Independence: 17th Inaugural Lecture, University Of Nairobi 26 March 1981, Nairobi: University of Nairobi
9. Leadership And Underdevelopment In Africa. Nairobi: Gideon S. Were, 1983
10. The Survivors (A Play), Nairobi: Equatorial Publishers, 1967; East African Literature Bureau, 1968
