= Kalambo District =

- District
- Location Rukwa Region.
- Coordinates: 08°18′S 031°31′E
- Country: Tanzania
- Region: Rukwa Region

Area
  - Total: 5,569 km^{2} (2,150 sq mi)

Population (2022)
  - Total: 316,783
  - Density: 56.88/km^{2} (147.3/sq mi)

Kalambo District is one of the four districts of the Rukwa Region of Tanzania, East Africa. The administrative seat is in Matai. The Kalambo River flows through the district and its mouth on Lake Tanganyika is about 15 km (9.3 mi) south of the town of Kasanga.

Kalambo District Council was officially established on 23 December 2012 after it was split off from the Sumbawanga District Council. Moshi Chang'a was the first District Commissioner, who served until his death in an auto accident in April 2014.

According to the 2022 Tanzania National Census, the population of Igunga District was 316,783 in 2022.

== Economy ==
Most people are employed in herding and subsistence farming. The major cash crops are maize, sunflowers, beans, cassava and honey. Some people are employed in artisanal mining and traditional fishing. There are copper deposits at Kasanga and Kapapa.

== Administrative subdivisions ==
=== Constituencies ===
For parliamentary elections, Tanzania is divided into constituencies. As of the 2010 elections the area that is now Kalambo District had one constituency:

- Kalambo Constituency

=== Divisions ===
Kalambo District is administratively divided into 5 divisions. 1. Matai 2. Mwazye 3. Mwimbi 4. Kasanga 5. Mambwe Nkoswe

=== Wards ===
Kalambo District is administratively divided into 23 wards: 1. Kasanga 2. Katazi 3. Katete 4. Kisumba 5. Legeza Mwendo 6. Mambwe Kenya 7. Mambwe Nkoswe 8. Matai 9. Mkali 10 Mkowe 11. Msanzi 12. Mwazye 13. Mwimbi 14. Sopa 15. Ulumi 16. Sundu 17. Mbuluma 18. Lyowa 19. Samazi 20. Kilesha 21. Mnamba 22. Kanyezi 23. Mpombwe
