= Mambwe-Lungu language =

Bantu language spoken in Tanzania and Zambia

Mambwe
- Lungu
- Native to: Tanzania, Zambia
- Ethnicity: Mambwe, Lungu, Fipa
- Native speakers: 500,000 (2002 & 2010 censuses)
- Language family: Niger–Congo?: Atlantic–Congo; Volta–Congo; Benue–Congo; Southern Bantoid; Bantu; Rukwa; Mbozi; Mwika; Mambwe
- Dialects: Mambwe (Ichimambwe); Cilungu/Lungu (Ichirungu, Adong); Fipa-Mambwe (Kifipa cha kimambwe)

Language codes
- ISO 639-3: mgr
- Glottolog: mamb1296
- Guthrie code: M.14–15

The Mambwe and Lungu peoples living at the southern end of Lake Tanganyika in Tanzania and Zambia speak a common language with minor dialectical differences. Perhaps half of the Fipa people to their north speak it as a native language. When spoken by the Fipa, it is called "Fipa-Mambwe"; this is also the term for the branch of Bantu languages which includes Fipa and Mambwe-Lungu. Mambwe-Lungu is more similar to Kaonde than to Kinyarwanda.

Mambwe-Lungu is spoken by the people of Rukwa region, southern Sumbawanga town in Tanzania. The language is also spoken in Mankato, Mpulungu and Senga district of Zambia. It has close affinities with languages spoken by other Tanganyikan people like Pimbwe, Rungwa and Namwanga.

== Relevant literature ==
- Bickmore, Lee. 2008. Cilungu Phonology. Stanford, Center for the Study of Language and Communication.
- Halemba, Andrzej. 2005. Religious and Ethical Values in the Proverbs of the Mambwe People (Zambia). Vol. 1. Poland.
- Werner, A. and A. N. Tucker. 1940. Mambwe Proverbs. Bulletin of the School of Oriental Studies 10.2 (1940), pp. 455-467.
