= Rukwa Region =

Region of Tanzania

Rukwa Region Mkoa wa Rukwa (Swahili)
- Region
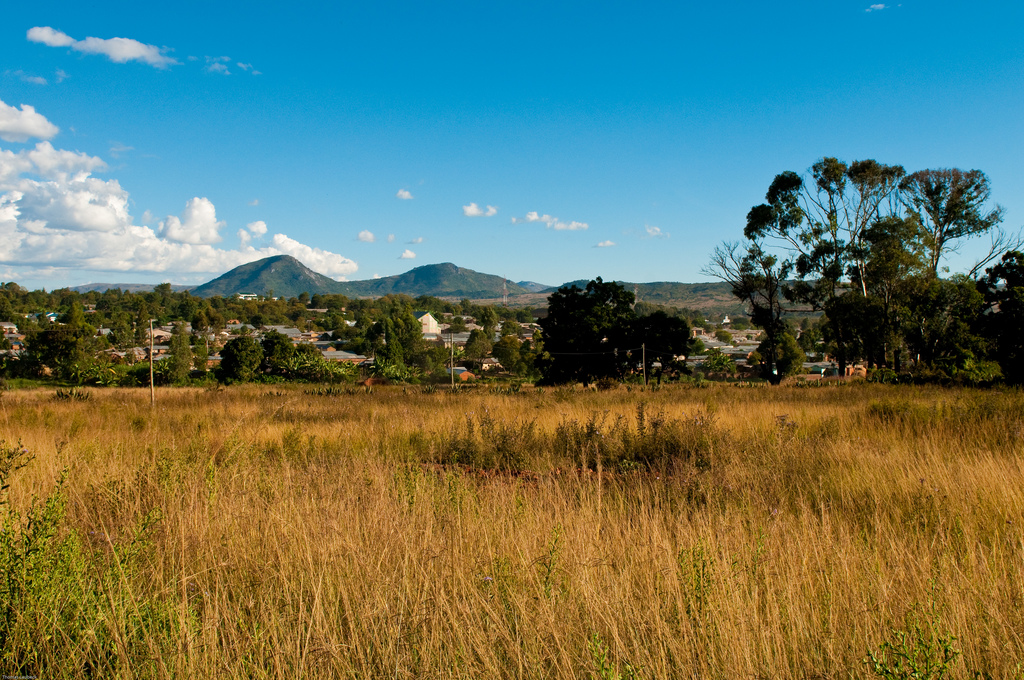
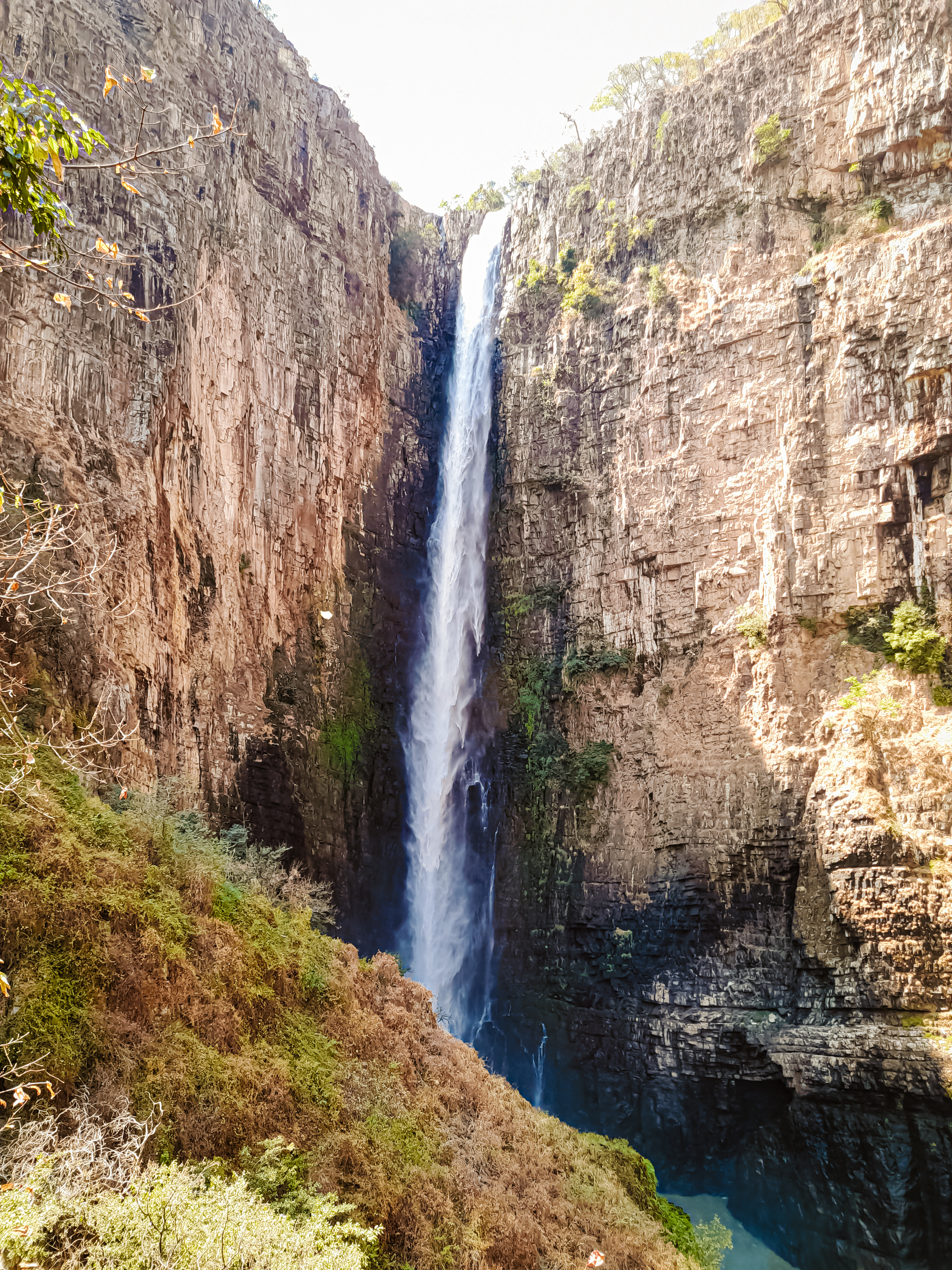
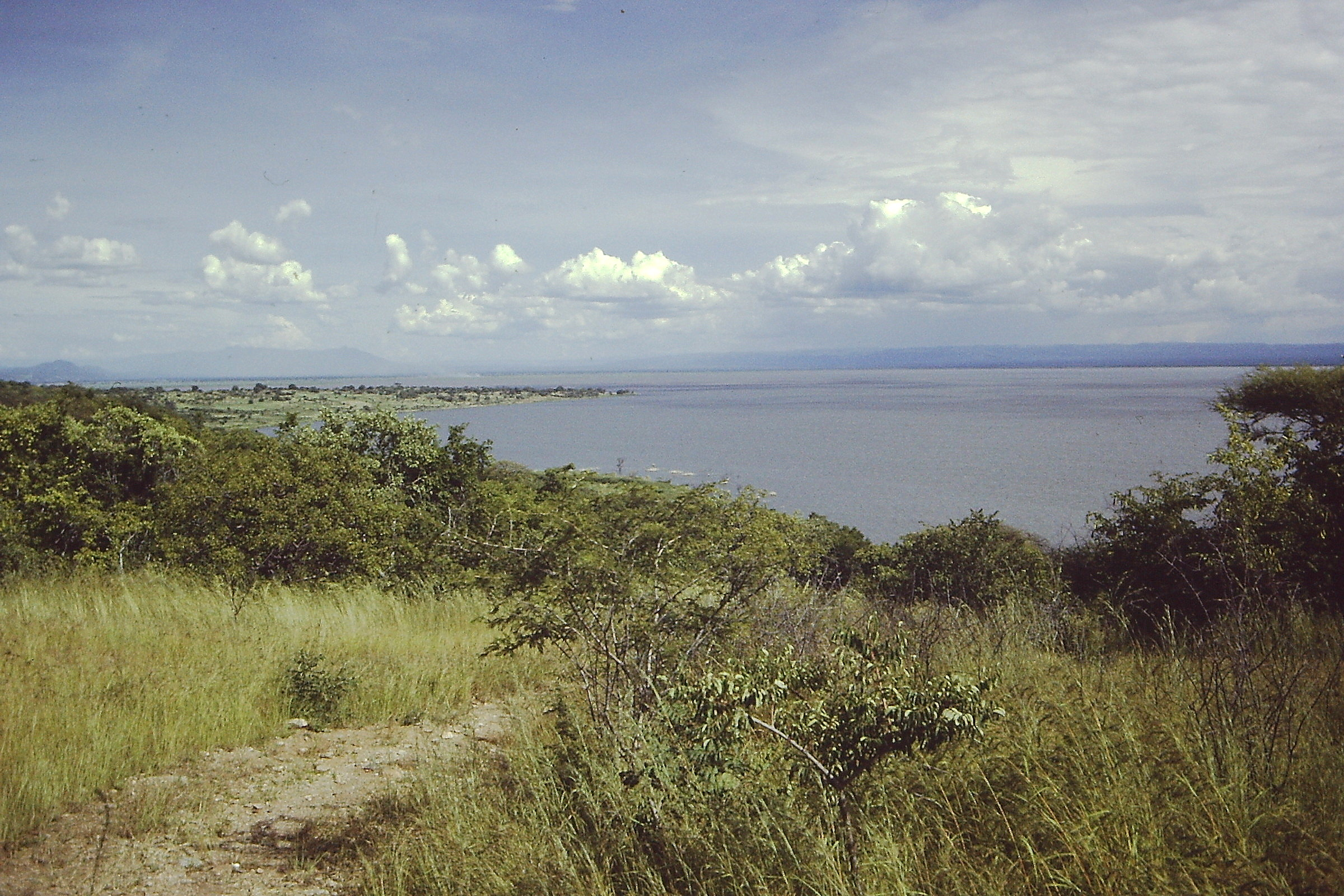
- From top to bottom: View of the city of Sumbawanga, Kalambo falls & Lake Rukwa
- Nickname: The region of magic
- Location in Tanzania
- Coordinates: 8°0′39.24″S 31°26′44.16″E
- Country: Tanzania
- Zone: Western
- Region: 1975
- Capital: Sumbawanga
- Districts: List: Nkasi District; Kalambo District; Sumbawanga Urban District; Sumbawanga Rural District

Government
  - Regional Commissioner: Queen Sendiga (CCM)

Area
  - Total: 27,765 km^{2} (10,720 sq mi)
  - Land: 21,160 km^{2} (8,170 sq mi)
  - Water: 6,605 km^{2} (2,550 sq mi) 23.79%
  - Rank: 18th of 31
- Highest elevation (Malonje): 2,350 m (7,710 ft)

Population (2022)
  - Total: 1,540,519
  - Rank: 21st of 31
  - Density: 72.80/km^{2} (188.6/sq mi)
- Demonym: Rukwan

Ethnic groups
  - Settler: Swahili
  - Native: Fipa, Nyiha, Lyangalile, Mambwe & Lungu
- Time zone: UTC+3 (EAT)
- Postcode: 55xxx
- Area code: 025
- ISO 3166 code: TZ-20
- HDI (2021): 0.483 low · 24th of 25
- Website: Official website
- Symbols of Tanzania
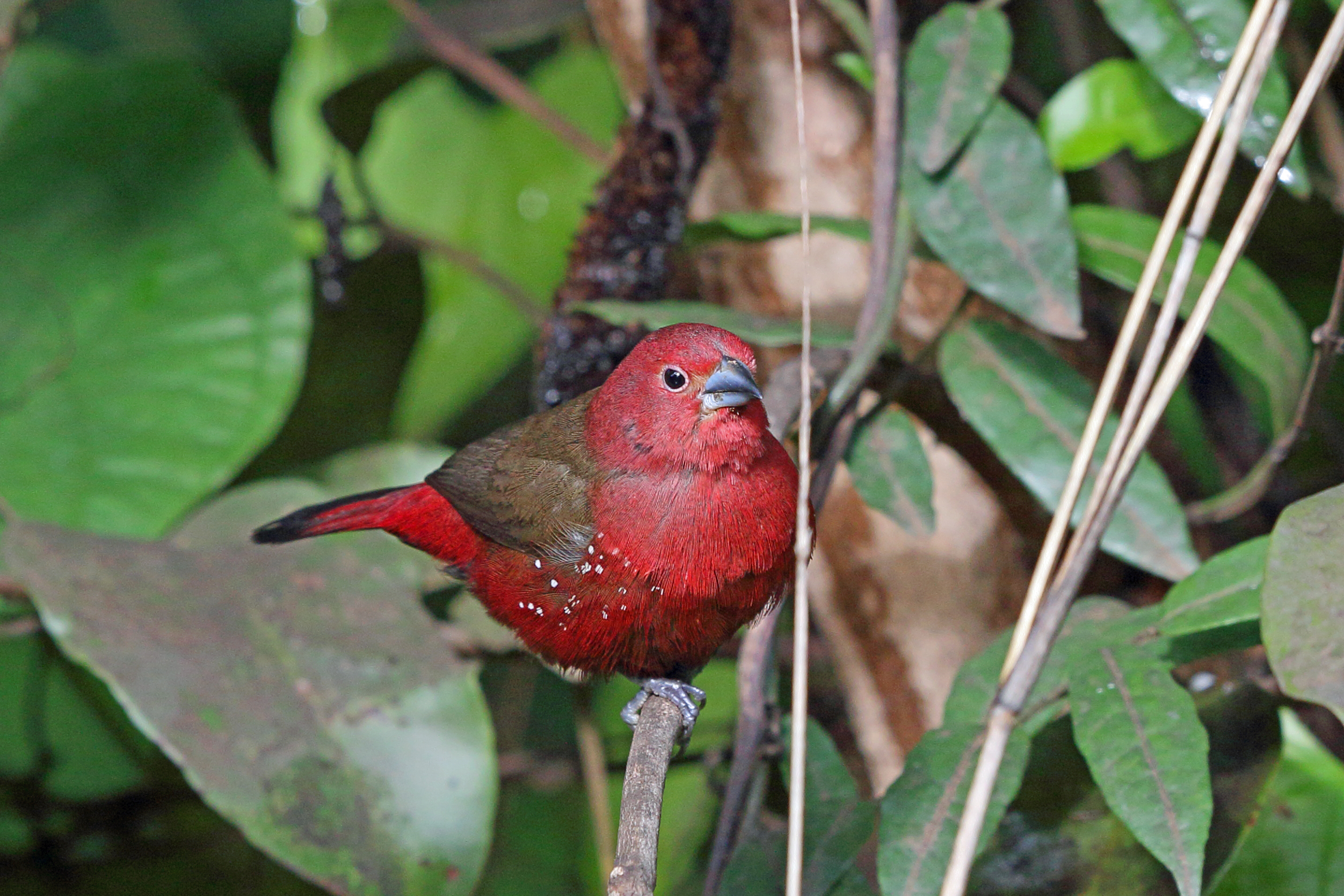
- Bird: African firefinch

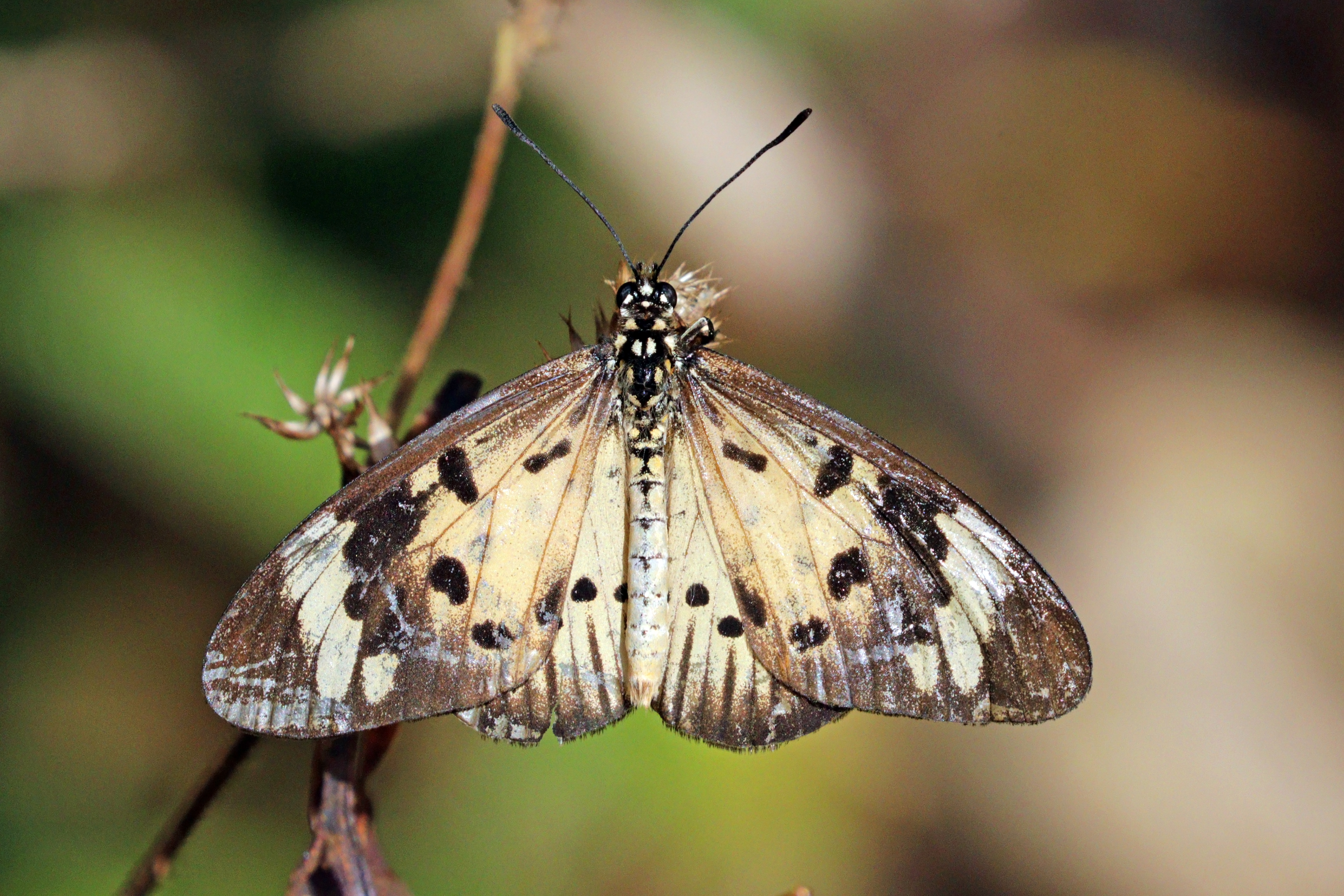
- Butterfly: Acraea encedon

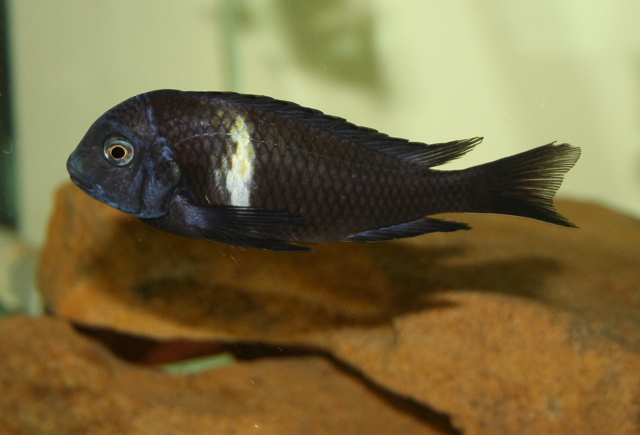
- Fish: Tropheus duboisi

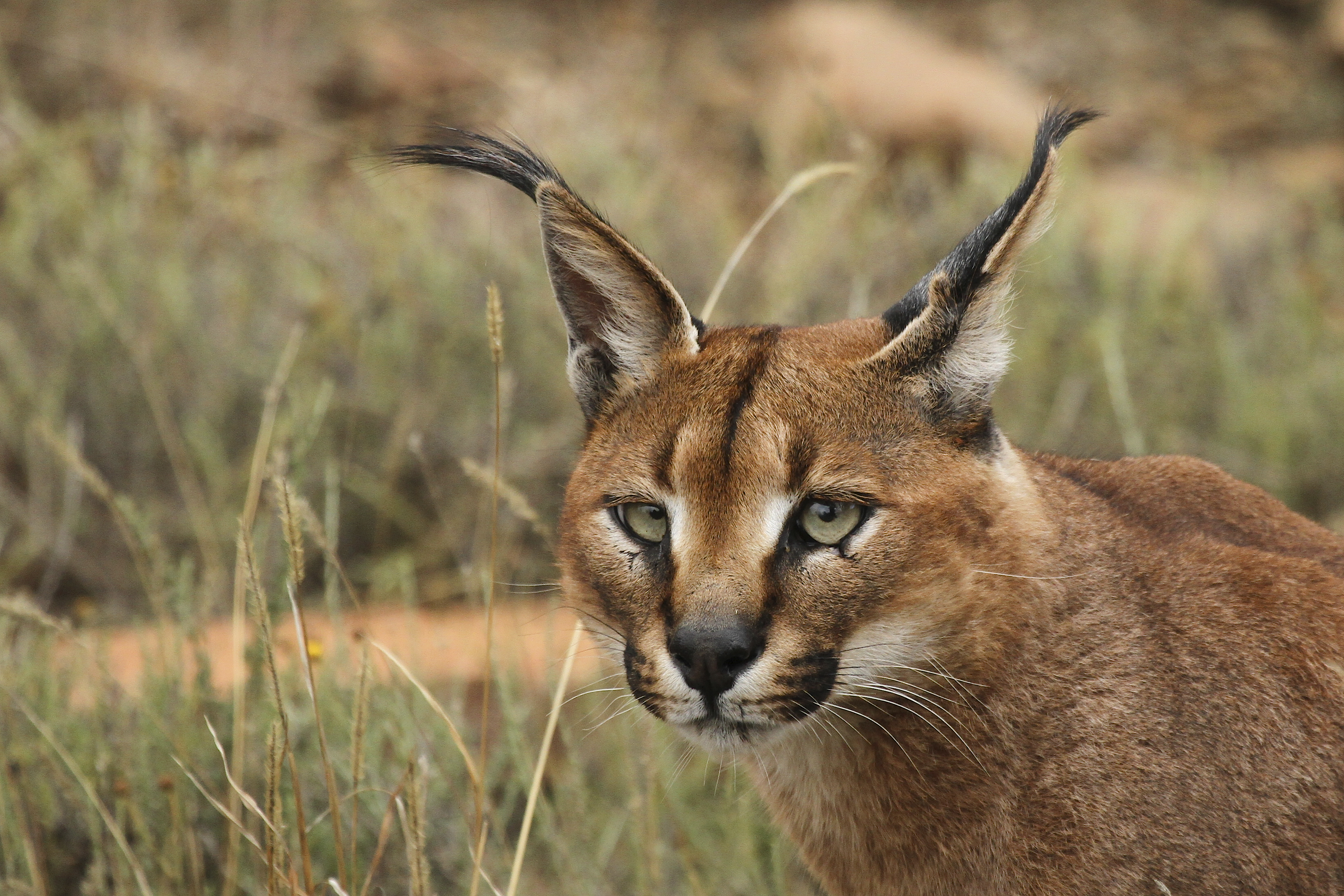
- Mammal: Caracal

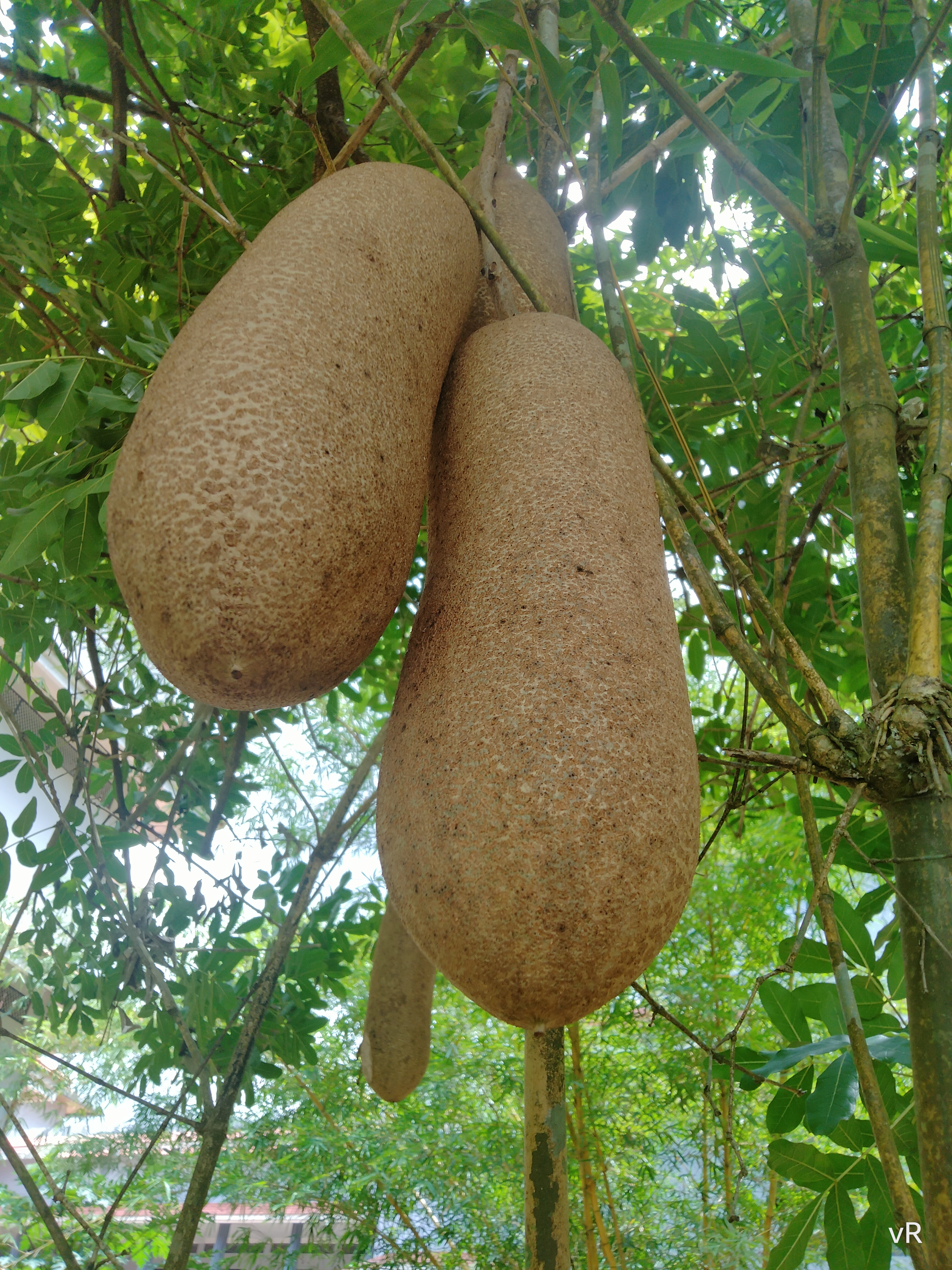
- Tree: Sausage tree

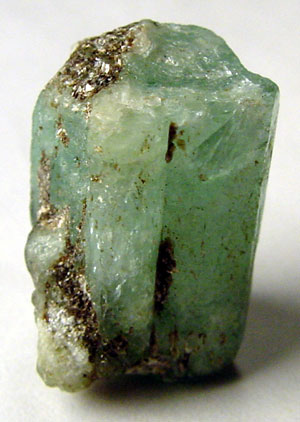
- Mineral: Emerald

Rukwa Region (Swahili: Mkoa wa Rukwa) is one of Tanzania's 31 administrative regions The region covers a land area of 27,765 km^{2} (10,720 sq mi), which is comparable in size to the combined land area of the nation state of Haiti. Rukwa Region is bordered to the north by Katavi Region, to the east by Songwe Region, to the south by the nation of Zambia and to the west by Lake Tanganyika, which forms a border between Tanzania and the Democratic Republic of the Congo. The regional capital is the municipality of Sumbawanga. According to the 2022 national census, the region had a population of 1,540,519.

== History ==
The region's name comes from Lake Rukwa, it was established in 1975 by President Julius Nyerere by taking Mpanda District from the Tabora Region and the former unified Sumbawanga District from the Mbeya Region. Nkasi District was established in 1984. In 2012, the region was reorganized with the Mpanda District going to the new Katavi Region.

== Geography ==
The Rukwa region has a total surface area of 27,765 km^{2}, of which 6,605 km2 (23.79%) is made up of water bodies and 21,160 km^{2} (76.21%) is made up of land. Nkasi District, which makes up 47.27 percent of the region's total area, and Sumbawanga District, which makes up 36.74 percent, dominate the distribution of the region's area among the districts. The smallest district is Kalambo, which makes up only 15.99% of the region's total area.

Three significant superficial geological deposits can be found in the Rukwa Region. In the high areas, these are the sandy soils, shallow, dispersed clayey lacustrines, and ferralitic soils. Western Tanzania is where the Rukwa Region is located. Malonje in the Ufipa plateau has the highest point in the area at 2,461 meters above sea level, and Lake Tanganyika has the lowest point at 773 meters above sea level. The Miombo Woodlands, which predominate in Sumbawanga and Nkasi and are home to commercially valuable trees like Mninga (Pterocarpus angolensis) and Mputu, making up the majority of Rukwa Region's vegetation.

=== Climate ===
The region has a tropical climate, with average monthly highs of 27°C in October and December and lows of 13°C in some locations in June and July. Rukwa region has had consistent, unimodal rainfall for many years; falling from November through May, ranging from 800 to 1300 mm annually. Following the rainy season, the dry season lasts into October.

== Economy ==
Agriculture (crops, livestock, fisheries, and forestry), tourism, and mining make up the majority of the region's producing industries. The Rukwa Region's population relies on agriculture for about 80% of their income. There are 1,660,600 ha of arable land and only 447,079 ha (or about 32% of arable land) are under cultivation.

Rukwa Region's GDP at current market prices increased by 1,529,289, 2,407,234 and 2,677,131 in 2012, 2013, and 2014, respectively. In 2012, 2013 and 2014, the per capita income was 974,601, 1,485,563 and 1,599,845 respectively. From 2003 and 2012, the sustained GDP growth rate ranged from 7 to 18 percent on average. Despite the region being dominated by agriculture, gemstones like emerald and others are abundant in Rukwa. The region has large variety of industrial and base metal minerals, including kaolin, quartz, graphite, tin, limonite, copper, and cobalt.

=== Agriculture ===
Rukwa is an agrarian society where agriculture accounts for around 80% of people's daily income. Maize, paddy, beans, wheat, millet, and cassava are among of the crops that are grown. Sunflower, groundnuts, sesame, barley, and other vegetables are among the others. Although agriculture is not yet fully mechanized, the trend indicates that there is an excess of certain crops, notably maize, paddy, cassava, sunflower, and sesame. Smallholder farmers who work between 0.5 and 2.0 ha account for 68 percent of the farmed area in the Rukwa region and are the main form of agriculture.

A total of 72,915 ha in the region have the capacity to be irrigated; however, only 5,768 ha of that total—or 7.9 percent of the irrigable land—can now be irrigated. There are 25 possible irrigation scheme sites in the region, of which 9 have been constructed for contemporary irrigation facilities and 16 are under traditional irrigation. A 20% GDP contribution from livestock is made in the Rukwa region. Each family of farmers keeps 12 cattle on average. A massive inflow of agro pastoralists from Tabora, Shinyanga, and Mwanza have, however, moved into the area during the past ten years in search of pasture for their animals. Each household of the migrating pastoralists keeps 100 to 300 cattle on average. There are currently 446,746 cattle in the Rukwa region, according to estimates. The region's growing cattle population presents an opportunity for the development of enterprises that process livestock products.

In the Rukwa region, there are two ranches and one dairy farm. Heritage Farm is the owner of the dairy farm in the Sumbawanga Municipality's Malonje. The beef ranches in Nkundi and Kalambo are owned by SAAFI and NARCO, respectively. Rukwa region only has 1,103 improved dairy animals, or 0.27% of the 399,025 dairy animals in the nation, according to the sample census from 2002/2003. According to the most recent data (2013/2014 reports), there are 537 dairy goats and 7,061 dairy cattle in the Rukwa region.

In the Rukwa region, 102,260 tons of fish were produced between 1997 and 2002, totaling TZS 3.453 billion. 99 percent of the fish are captured in the Nkasi district. There are two large lakes in the area, Lake Tanganyika and Lake Rukwa. Other smaller lakes and rivers exist. Sardines, tilapia, nile perch, mud fish, luciolates strapessil "Migebuka," and numerous ornamental fish species are among the varieties of fish that may be found in the region.In the Muze community, which is close to Lake Rukwa, crocodile farming is done on a modest scale.

=== Infrastructure ===
There are 2,512.73 km of roads in the area. Only 106.70 km and 676.65 km of the 2,512.73 km total length of the road network are paved. The remaining roads are earthen ones that are kept up. The LGAs (Local government) are in charge of the remaining network while TANROADS manages the trunk and regional roads. The Kalambo district has the fewest roads, whereas Sumbawanga Municipality has the most.

Along the shores of Lake Tanganyika and Lake Rukwa, marine transportation is an important factor in the movement of people and goods. On Lake Tanganyika, two commercial vessels—the Mwongozo and the Liemba—serve the communities of Kabwe, Korongwe, Ninde, Wampembe, Kala, Kirando, Kipili, and Kasanga. They are unreliable, though. Ships are required to anchor some distance from the beach (about 1 to 1.5 nautical miles) with the exception of Kasanga, where there is a landing platform; as a result, goods and passengers must be brought to the ships by small boats. Marine services connect the territory to the neighboring nations of Zambia, the Congo DR, and Burundi as well as the neighboring Regions of Katavi and Kigoma. Only boats are permitted for transportation within Lake Rukwa.

In Rukwa Region, there is just one (1) public airport and four (4) private airstrips. The Sumbawanga Municipal Council is home to the public airport. The region is served by only two commercial flights, according to Tanzania Airports Authority (TAA). As of mass communication, In the Rukwa Region, twelve radio stations are accessible. As for water, according to the population and housing census from 2012, protected wells were the primary source of drinking water for 49.4% of all private homes. In Sumbawanga Municipal Council and Namanyere Town, which includes nine villages of Nkasi DC, electricity is provided by TANESCO. Only 7% of families in the area consume power provided by TANESCO, according to a 2002 Household Budget Survey. TANESCO intends to expand in rural areas through REA. Hydropower from Zambia and thermal electricity generating facilities in Sumbawanga Municipality are the sources of this electricity.

=== Mining ===
While there are extensive mineral resources in the Rukwa Region, there are no active large mines. Gem stones, including emerald, moonstone, aquamarine, amethyst, ruby, and topaz, have been recovered from a number of locations. There are coal seams in the Muze, Namwele, and Mkomolo areas, and some mining has occurred there.

=== Tourism and Reserves ===
Due to its abundance of natural tourist resources, Rukwa can claim of exceptional tourist attractions. These include the Old Bismark Fort at Kasanga, the Kalambo Falls, the Hot Springs of Kizombwe, the shore of Lake Tanganyika, the Mbizi forest, Lake Kwela, and Ntembwa Falls. There are only two game reserves in the area, Lwafi (2200 km2) and Uwanda (2200 km2), as well as one game controlled area, Kwela (500 km sq). On average, 1.4% of the area is covered by natural forest reserves. The Miombo Woodlands, which predominate in the Sumbawanga and Nkasi districts and include commercially significant timber like Mninga (Pterocarpus angolensis) and Mputu, are where forest products are gathered.

== Population ==
Population growth in the Rukwa region is accelerated in part by an inflow of migrants from other areas looking for better prospects there. Approximately 25% of the people of the Region are recent migrants from other regions of Tanzania. Fipa and a small number of other tribes, including Mambwe, Lungu, Nyiha and, Lyangalile, initially dominated the area and are the native inhabitants. The Regional population in 2012 was 1,004,539, with 487,311 males and 517,228 females. The National Bureau of Statistics (NBS) predicts that in 2017, the population will be 1,192,373, with 578,431 males and 613,942 females, growing at a 3.2% annual rate. For 2002–2012, the region's 3.2 percent average annual population growth rate was tied for the third highest in the country. It was also the twentieth most densely populated region with 44 people per square kilometer.

Census	Population
2002	729,060
2012	1,004,539
2022	1,540,519

== Administrative divisions ==
=== Districts ===
Rukwa Region is divided into one city and three districts, each administered by a council (i.e. Sumbawanga Municipal Council (MC); Sumbawanga District Council; Kalambo District Council; and Nkasi District Council). Furthermore, Rukwa has two townships (i.e. Laela and Namanyere located in Sumbawanga and Nkasi Districts respectively). Rukwa has 16 divisions, 97 wards, 339 villages, 1817 sub-villages/hamlets and 165 streets.

Districts of Rukwa Region
District	Administrative Centre	Population (2012 Census)
Kalambo District	Matai	207,700
Lyamba lya Mfipa District	Mtowisa	162,557
Nkasi District	Namanyere	281,200
Sumbawanga District	Sumbawanga	353,082
Total		1,004,539

== Health and Education ==
=== Education ===
In the region, there are 347 pre-primary school classes, 347 of which are run by the government, and just 4 by private institutions. There are 22,087 preschoolers, 11,107 of them are boys and 10,980 of whom are girls. There are 357 primary schools in the region, of which 353 are public and 4 are privately owned. A total of 201,012 students attend all schools, with 100,201 boys and the remaining 100,801 girls. B/C 61, Grade IIIA 4,422, Diploma 112, First Degree 53, and Masters Degree 1 are the various classifications of the 4,649 teachers in the region as of 2014. Nevertheless, the area need 5,126 instructors. There is a 946-teacher shortfall in the area in this regard.

Primary school students perform satisfactorily academically. In comparison to 2010, when the standard IV exam passing rate was 91.68%, it was lower in 2011 (70.78%). When it comes to standard VII, the rate went from 24% in 2012 to 40% in 2013. There are 80 secondary schools in the area, 68 of which are public and 12 of which are privately operated. Four (4) Teachers' Training Colleges (TTC) in the region. In Sumbawanga, St. Aggrey, Rukwa, and St. Maurus Chemchem—produce teachers for grades IIIA and diploma programs. Additionally, Sumbawanga TTC offers certificates in domestic science. There is only one Open University Center in the area, and it has been operating since September 21, 2000. Other candidates in numerous professions have already received diplomas and degrees from the center to date.

=== Health ===
As of 2014, there are 202 health facilities in Rukwa Region; 3 hospitals, 20 health centers and 179 dispensary. Malaria, acute respiratory infection (ARI), pneumonia, diarrhea, skin conditions, intestinal worms, minor surgical conditions, ill-defined symptoms (no diagnosis), eye infection, HIV/AIDS/STI, tuberculosis, meningitis, and other common diseases are among those that have higher morbidity and mortality rates. Infant mortality is 78/1000, under-five mortality is 81/1000, and severe malnutrition is 1.3%. Maternal mortality is 128/100,000.

According to THMIS (Tanzania Health Ministry) 2003/2004, the regional HIV/AIDS prevalence was 6%; however, by THMIS 2007/2008, it had decreased to 4.9%. Also, according to THMIS 2011/2012, the frequency in the area has recently increased to 6.2%. It has increased as a result of increased population migration and continuing significant water and road building projects.As of 2014, Improvements to the infrastructure have allowed Care and Treatment Facilities (CTCs) to be built at local and regional hospitals with the help of WRP. CD4 and PIMA equipment were purchased and installed in three hospitals and ten health centers. At all levels, a lot of health service providers have received training.

By the end of December 2013, 86 percent of healthcare institutions were offering Provider Initiative Testing and Counseling (PITC) services, up from 86 percent in 2008 when 57 sites offered Voluntary, Counseling and Testing (VCT) services and 20 CTC sites. Pre-test counseling and testing for new clients totaled 115,669 as of the end of 2013, up from the 5401 reported in 2008. PMTCT sites increased from 68 reported in 2008 to 139 in December 2013. Initiatives like male circumcision have been implemented to lessen the impact of HIV/AIDS in the region, and as of December 2013, 57,658 clients had undergone the procedure.

== Notable people ==
- Polycarp Pengo, Catholic cardinal
