= Lake Rukwa =

Lake in Songwe, Katavi and Rukwa Regions, Tanzania

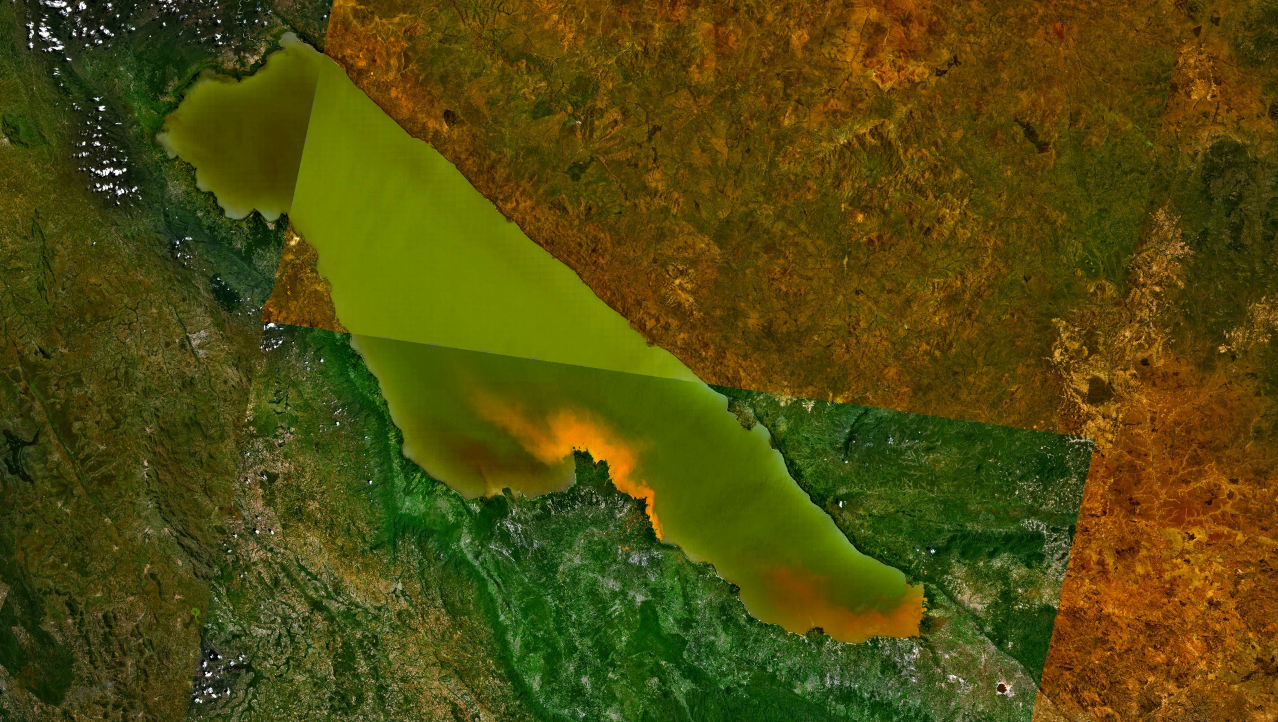
- Lake Rukwa, as seen from space.

- Location within Tanzania

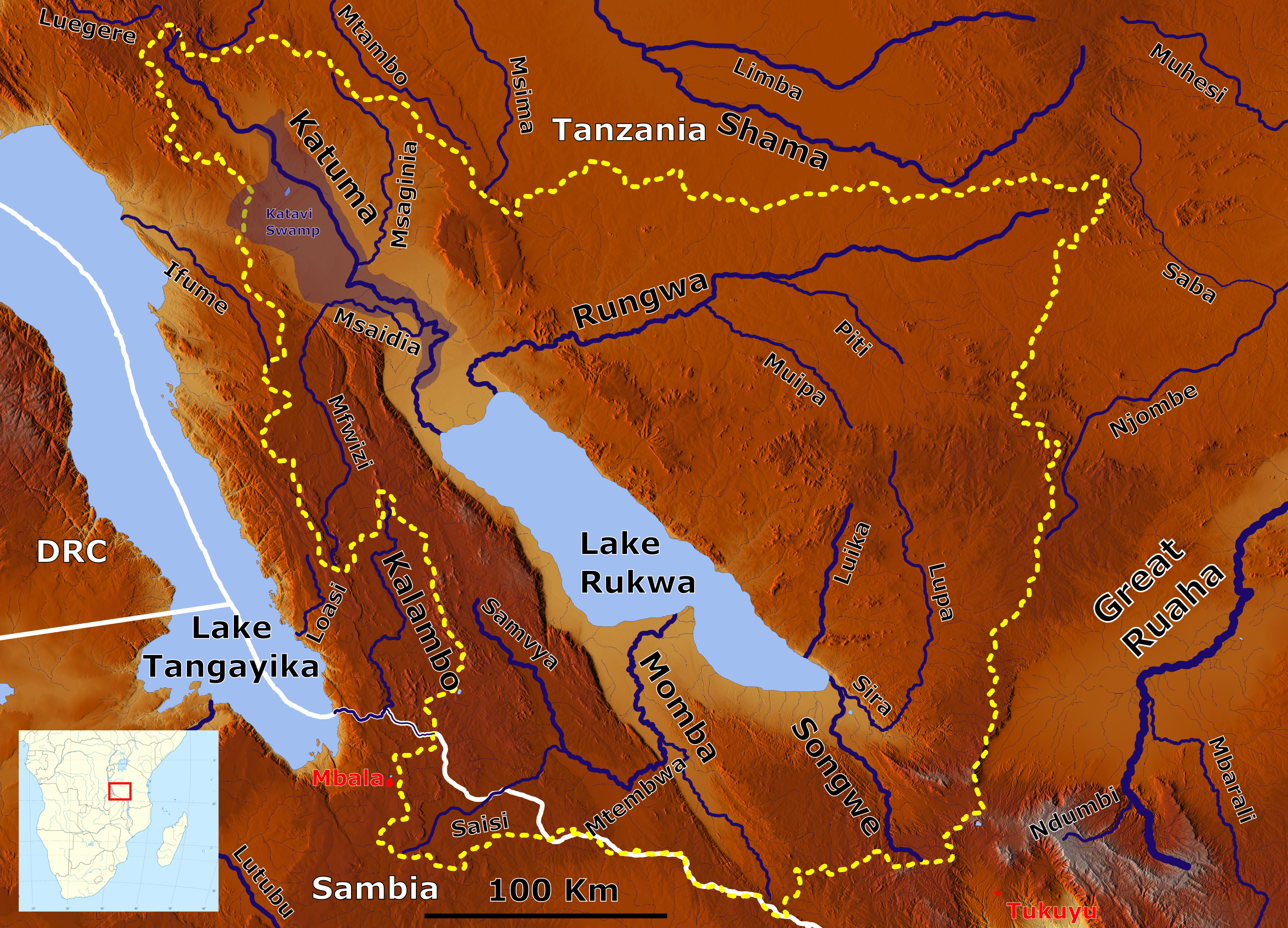
- Location: Rukwa Region, Songwe Region and Katavi Region, Tanzania
- Coordinates: 8°00′S 32°25′E
- Type: alkaline
- Catchment area: 88,000 km^{2} (34,000 sq mi)
- Basin countries: Tanzania
- Surface elevation: 800 metres (2,600 ft)

Lake Rukwa is an endorheic lake located in the Rukwa Valley of Rukwa Region, Songwe Region and Katavi Region in southwestern Tanzania. The lake is the third largest inland body of water in the country.

== Geography ==
The alkaline Lake Rukwa lies midway between Lake Tanganyika and Lake Malawi at an elevation of about 800 metres (2,600 ft), in a parallel branch of the rift system. Almost half of the lake lies in Uwanda Game Reserve.

== Hydrology ==
The lake has seen large fluctuations in its size over the years, due to varying inflow of streams. Currently it is about 180 kilometres (110 mi) long and averages about 32 kilometres (20 mi) wide, making it about 5,760 square kilometres (2,220 mi^{2}) in size. In 1929 it was only about 48 kilometres (30 mi) long, but in 1939 it was about 128 kilometres (80 mi) long and 40 kilometres (25 mi) wide. During the early rifting of this part of Africa, the basin of Lake Rukwa may at times have been part of a much larger basin which also included the basins of Lake Tanganyika with Lake Malawi; ancient shorelines suggest a final date of overflow into Lake Tanganyika of 33,000 BP. For overflow to occur again, the lake's elevation would need to exceed 900 meters. Overflow into Lake Malawi is not possible now, since the pass between the two basin stands at over 2000 meters elevation. (Neither Lake Tanganyika nor Lake Malawi can overflow into Lake Rukwa since they already overflow into the Atlantic and Indian Oceans respectively.)

There is an accumulation of heavy metals like zinc, mercury, copper, lead, chromium, and nickel in sediment, water, and the muscle tissues of Clarias gariepinus (African catfish) and Oreochromis esculentus (Singida tilapia) in Lake Rukwa.

== Helium discovery ==
In 2016, an estimated 1.53 billion cubic meters (54.2 billion standard cubic feet) volume of helium gas was discovered in Lake Rukwa worth $3.5 billion.

== See also ==
- Rift Valley lakes
