= Collard (plant) =

Variety of plant

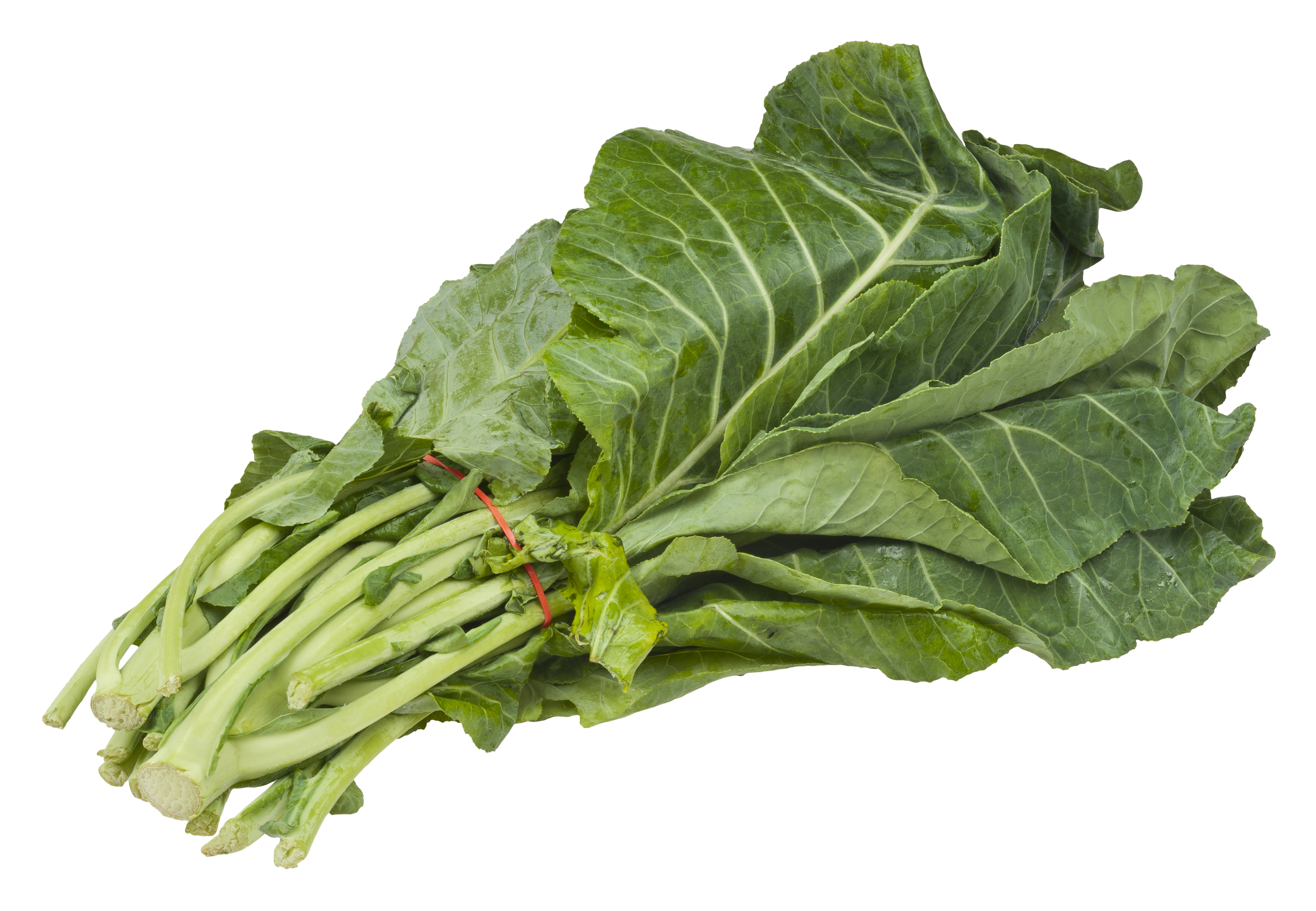
- A bundle of collard greens
- Species: Brassica oleracea
- Cultivar group: Acephala Group
- Origin: Greece
- Cultivar group members: Many; see text.

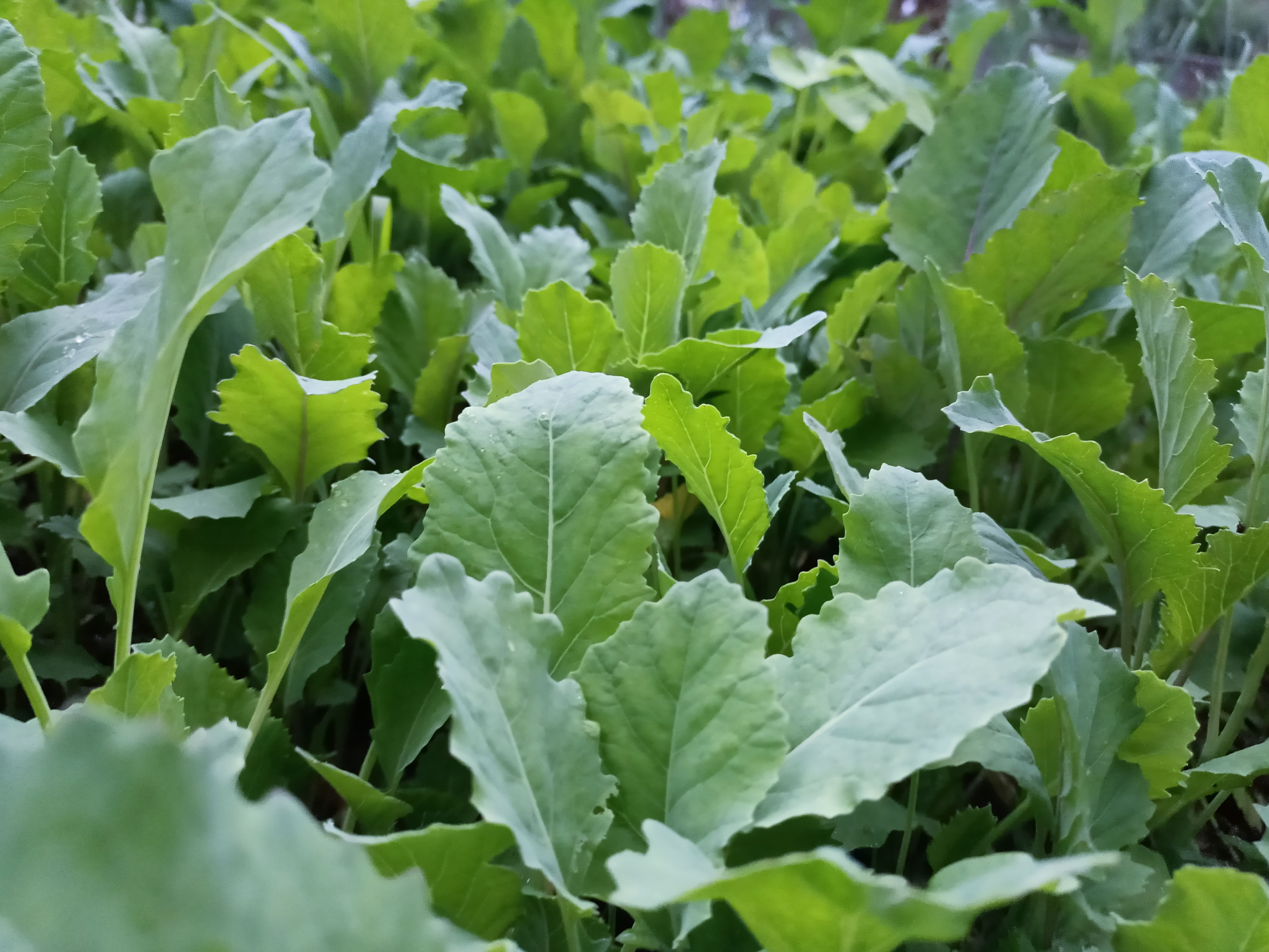
Young collard plants

Collard is a group of loose-leafed cultivars of Brassica oleracea (the same species as many common vegetables, including cabbage and broccoli). Part of the Acephala Group (or "kale group"), collard is also classified as the variety B. oleracea var. viridis.

The plants are grown as a food crop for their large, dark-green, edible leaves, which are cooked and eaten as vegetables. Collard has been cultivated as food since classical antiquity.

== Nomenclature ==
The term colewort is a medieval term for non-heading brassica crops.

The term collard has been used to include many non-heading Brassica oleracea crops. While American collards are best placed in the Viridis variety, the name Acephala group is also used. Acephala is Greek for 'without a head', referring to a lack of a close-knit core of leaves (a "head") as in cabbage, making collards more tolerant of high humidity levels and less susceptible to fungal diseases.

In Africa, it is known as sukuma (East Africa), muriwo or umBhida. In Kashmir, it is known as haakh (Kashmir).

== Description ==
Collard is a biennial where winter frost occurs; some varieties may be perennial in warmer regions. It has an upright stalk, often growing over two feet tall and up to six feet for the Portuguese cultivars. Popular cultivars of collard include 'Georgia Southern', 'Vates', 'Morris Heading', 'Blue Max', 'Top Bunch', 'Butter Collard' (couve manteiga), couve tronchuda, and Groninger Blauw.

== Taxonomy ==
Collard is generally described as part of the Acephala group (or "kale group"), but is also classified as the variety B. oleracea var. viridis.

== Cultivation ==
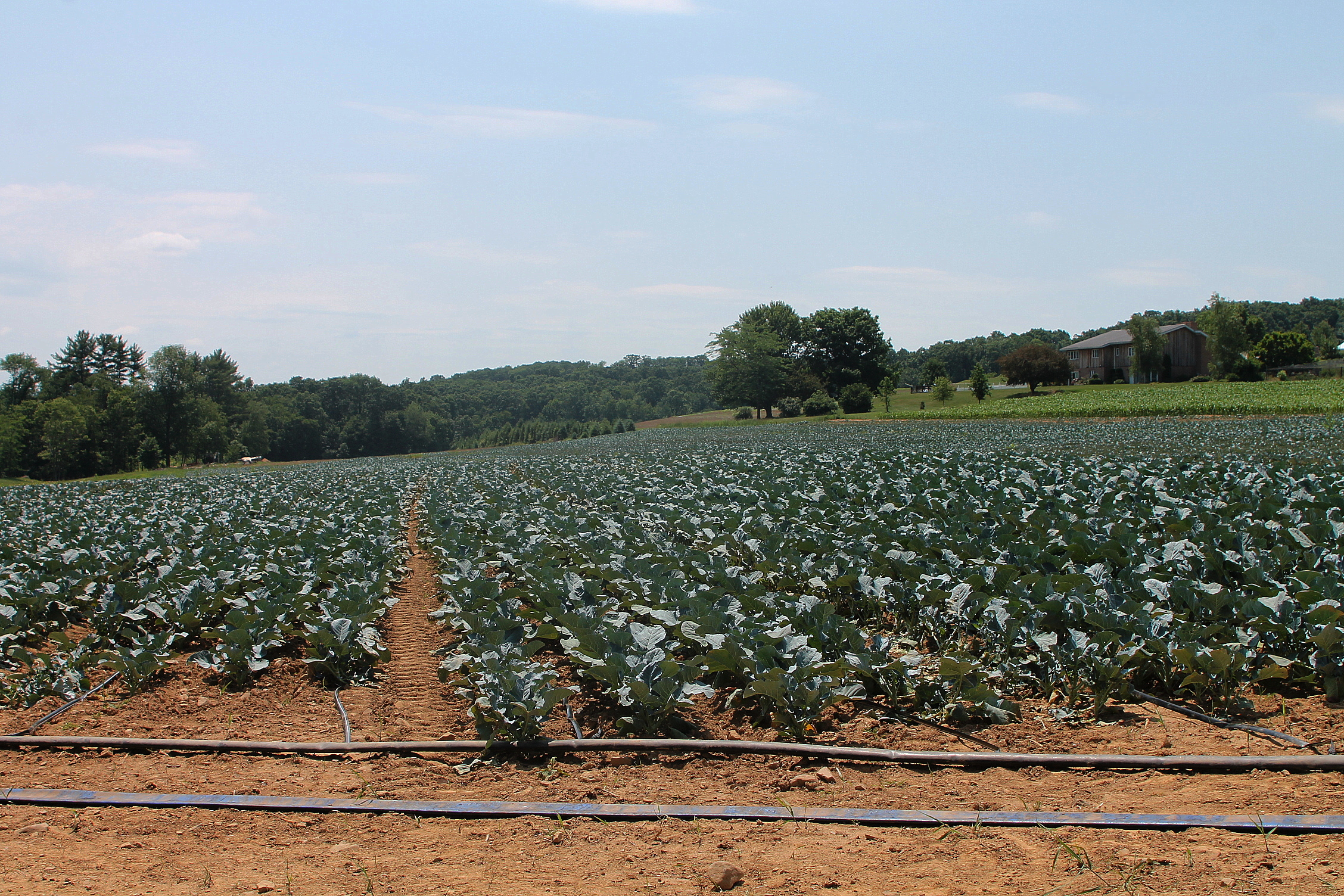
A field of collard in Pennsylvania

The plant is commercially cultivated for its thick, slightly bitter, edible leaves. They are available year-round, but are tastier and more nutritious in the cold months, after the first frost. For best texture, the leaves are picked before they reach their maximum size, at which stage they are thicker and are cooked differently from the new leaves. Age only has a minute effect on flavor.

Flavor and texture also depend on the cultivar; the couve manteiga and couve tronchuda are especially appreciated in Brazil and Portugal. The large number of varieties grown in the United States decreased as people moved to towns after World War II, leaving only five varieties commonly in cultivation. However, seeds of many varieties remained in use by individual farmers, growers and seed savers as well as within U.S. government seed collections. In the Appalachian region, cabbage collards, characterized by yellow-green leaves and a partially heading structure are more popular than the dark-green non-heading types in the coastal South. There have been projects from the early 2000s to both preserve seeds of uncommon varieties and also enable more varieties to return to cultivation.

=== Pests ===
The sting nematode, Belonolaimus gracilis and the awl nematode, Dolichodorus spp. are both ectoparasites that can injure collard. Root symptoms include stubby or coarse roots that are dark at the tips. Shoot symptoms include stunted growth, premature wilting, and chlorosis (Nguyen and Smart, 1975). Another species of the sting worm, Belonolaimus longicaudatus, is a pest of collards in Georgia and North Carolina (Robbins and Barker, 1973). B. longicaudatus is devastating to seedlings and transplants. As few as three nematodes per 100 g (3.5 oz) of soil when transplanting can cause significant yield losses on susceptible plants. They are most common in sandy soils.

The stubby root nematodes Trichodorus and Paratrichodorus attach and feed near the tip of collard's taproots. The damage caused prevents proper root elongation leading to tight mats that could appear swollen, therefore resulting in a "stubby root".

Several species of the root knot nematode Meloidogyne spp. infest collards. These include: M. javanica, M. incognita and M. arenaria. Second-stage juveniles attack the plant and settle in the roots. However, infestation seems to occur at lower populations compared to other cruciferous plants. Root symptoms include deformation (galls) and injury that prevent proper water and nutrient uptake. This could eventually lead to stunting, wilting and chlorosis of the shoots.

The false root knot nematode Nacobbus aberrans has a wide host range of up to 84 species including many weeds. On Brassicas it has been reported in several states, including Nebraska, Wyoming, Utah, Colorado, Montana, South Dakota, and Kansas. As a pest of collards, the degree of damage is dependent upon the nematode population in the soil.

Some collard cultivars exhibit resistance to bacterial leaf blight incited by Pseudomonas cannabina pv. alisalensis (Pca).

== Uses ==
=== Nutrition ===
Collard greens, boiled
Nutritional value per 100 g (3.5 oz)
- Energy: 137 kJ (33 kcal)
- Carbohydrates: 5.5 g
- Sugars: 0.4 g
- Dietary fiber: 4 g
- Fat: 0.7 g
- Protein: 2.7 g
Vitamins and minerals
Vitamins	Quantity %DV^{†}
Vitamin A equiv. beta-Carotene lutein zeaxanthin	42% 380 μg 42% 4513 μg 6197 μg
Thiamine (B1)	3% 0.04 mg
Riboflavin (B2)	8% 0.11 mg
Niacin (B3)	4% 0.58 mg
Pantothenic acid (B5)	4% 0.22 mg
Vitamin B6	8% 0.13 mg
Folate (B9)	4% 16 μg
Vitamin C	20% 18 mg
Vitamin E	6% 0.9 mg
Vitamin K	339% 407 μg
Minerals	Quantity %DV^{†}
Calcium	11% 141 mg
Iron	6% 1.13 mg
Magnesium	5% 21 mg
Manganese	22% 0.51 mg
Phosphorus	3% 32 mg
Potassium	4% 117 mg
Sodium	1% 15 mg
Zinc	2% 0.23 mg
- Other constituents: Quantity
- Water: 90.2 g
- Full Link to USDA Database entry
- ^{†}Percentages estimated using US recommendations for adults, except for potassium, which is estimated based on expert recommendation from the National Academies.

Raw collard greens are 90% water, 6% carbohydrates, 3% protein, and contain negligible fat (table). Like kale, collard greens contain substantial amounts of vitamin K (339% of the Daily Value, DV) in a 100-gram (3.5 oz) serving. Collard greens are rich sources (20% or more of DV) of vitamin A, vitamin C, and manganese, and moderate sources of calcium and vitamin B6. A 100-gram (3 1/2-ounce) reference serving of cooked collard greens provides 137 kilojoules (33 kilocalories) of food energy.

=== Culinary ===
==== East Africa ====
Collard greens are known as sukuma wiki in Swahilli and are one of the most common vegetables in East Africa. Sukuma is mainly lightly sauteed in oil until tender, flavoured with onions and seasoned with salt, and served either as the main dish or as a side dish with meat or fish. In Congo, Tanzania and Kenya, thinly sliced collard greens are commonly eaten alongside another popular dish made from maize flour, known as sima or ugali.

==== Southern and Eastern Europe ====
Collards have been cultivated in Europe for thousands of years with references to the Greeks and Romans back to the 1st century CE. In Montenegro, Dalmatia and Herzegovina, collard greens, locally known as raštika or raštan, were traditionally one of the staple vegetables. It is particularly popular in the winter, stewed with smoked mutton (kaštradina) or cured pork, root vegetables and potatoes. Known in Turkey as kara lahana ("dark cabbage"), it is a staple in the Black Sea area. It is also an essential ingredient in many Spanish soups and stews, like the pote asturiano, from the Asturian province.

==== United States ====
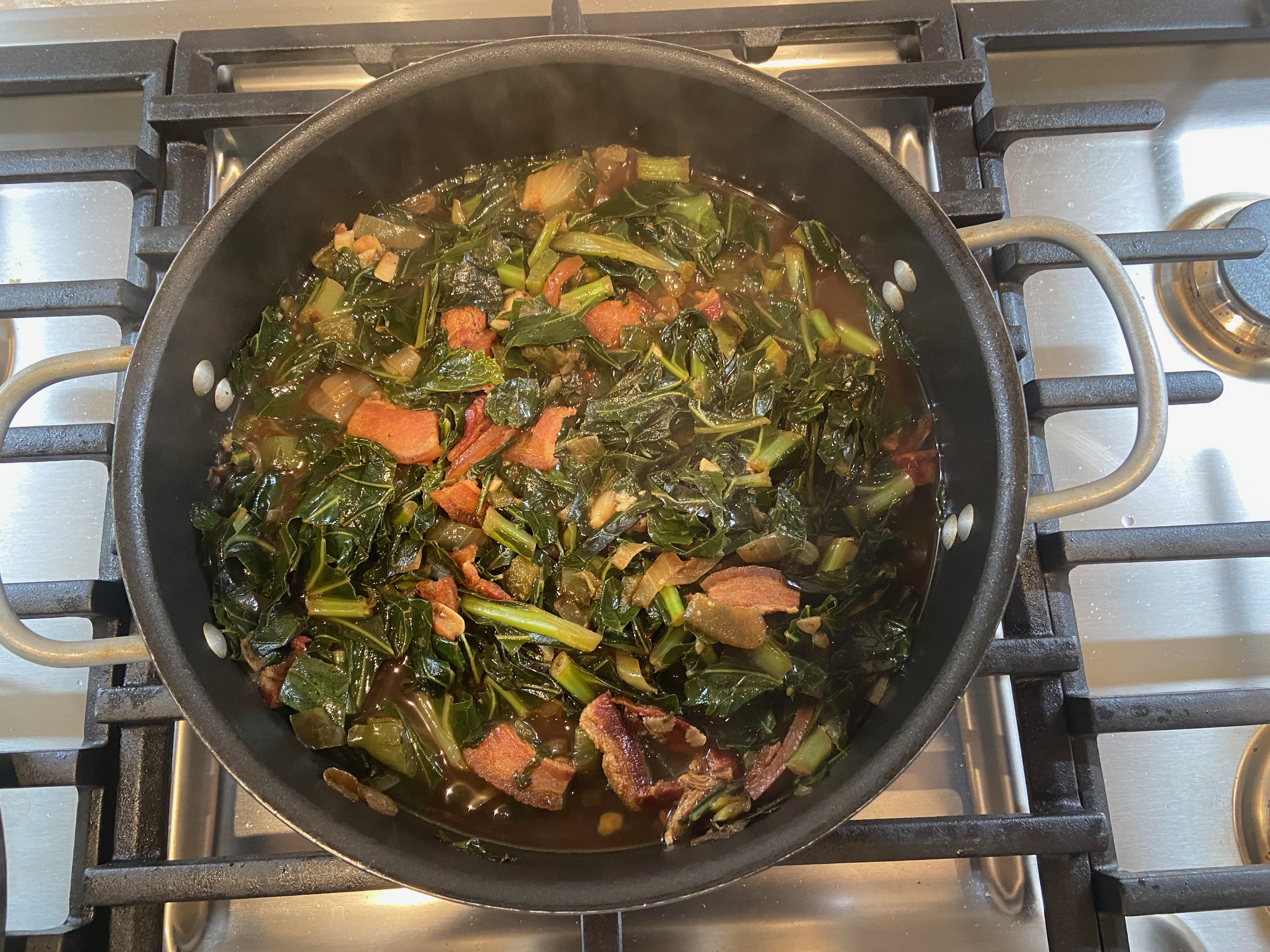
Collard greens fried with bacon, peppers, onions, and garlic, followed by slow cooking with chicken broth, salt, pepper, and cayenne

Collard greens are a staple vegetable in Southern U.S. cuisine. They are often prepared with other similar green leaf vegetables, such as spinach, kale, turnip greens, and mustard greens in the dish called "mixed greens". Typically used in combination with collard greens are smoked and salted meats (ham hocks, smoked turkey drumsticks, smoked turkey necks, pork neckbones, fatback or other fatty meat), diced onions, vinegar, salt, and black pepper, white pepper, or crushed red pepper, and some cooks add a small amount of sugar. Traditionally, collards are eaten on New Year's Day, along with black-eyed peas or field peas and cornbread, to ensure wealth in the coming year. Cornbread is used to soak up the "pot liquor", a nutrient-rich collard broth. Collard greens may also be thinly sliced and fermented to make a collard sauerkraut that is often cooked with flat dumplings. Landrace collard in-situ genetic diversity and ethnobotany are subjects of research for citizen-science groups.

During the time of slavery in the U.S., collards were one of the most common plants grown in kitchen gardens and were used to supplement the rations provided by plantation owners. Greens were widely used because the plants could last through the winter weather and could withstand the heat of a southern summer even more so than spinach or lettuce.

Broadly, collard greens symbolize Southern culture and African-American culture and identity. For example, jazz composer and pianist Thelonious Monk sported a collard leaf in his lapel to represent his African-American heritage. In President Barack Obama's first state dinner, collard greens were included on the menu. Novelist and poet Alice Walker used collards to reference the intersection of African-American heritage and black women. There have been many collard festivals that celebrate African-American identity, including those in Port Wentworth, Georgia (since 1997), East Palo Alto, California (since 1998), Columbus, Ohio (since 2010), and Atlanta, Georgia (since 2011). In 2010, the Latibah Collard Greens Museum opened in Charlotte, North Carolina.

==== Brazil and Portugal ====
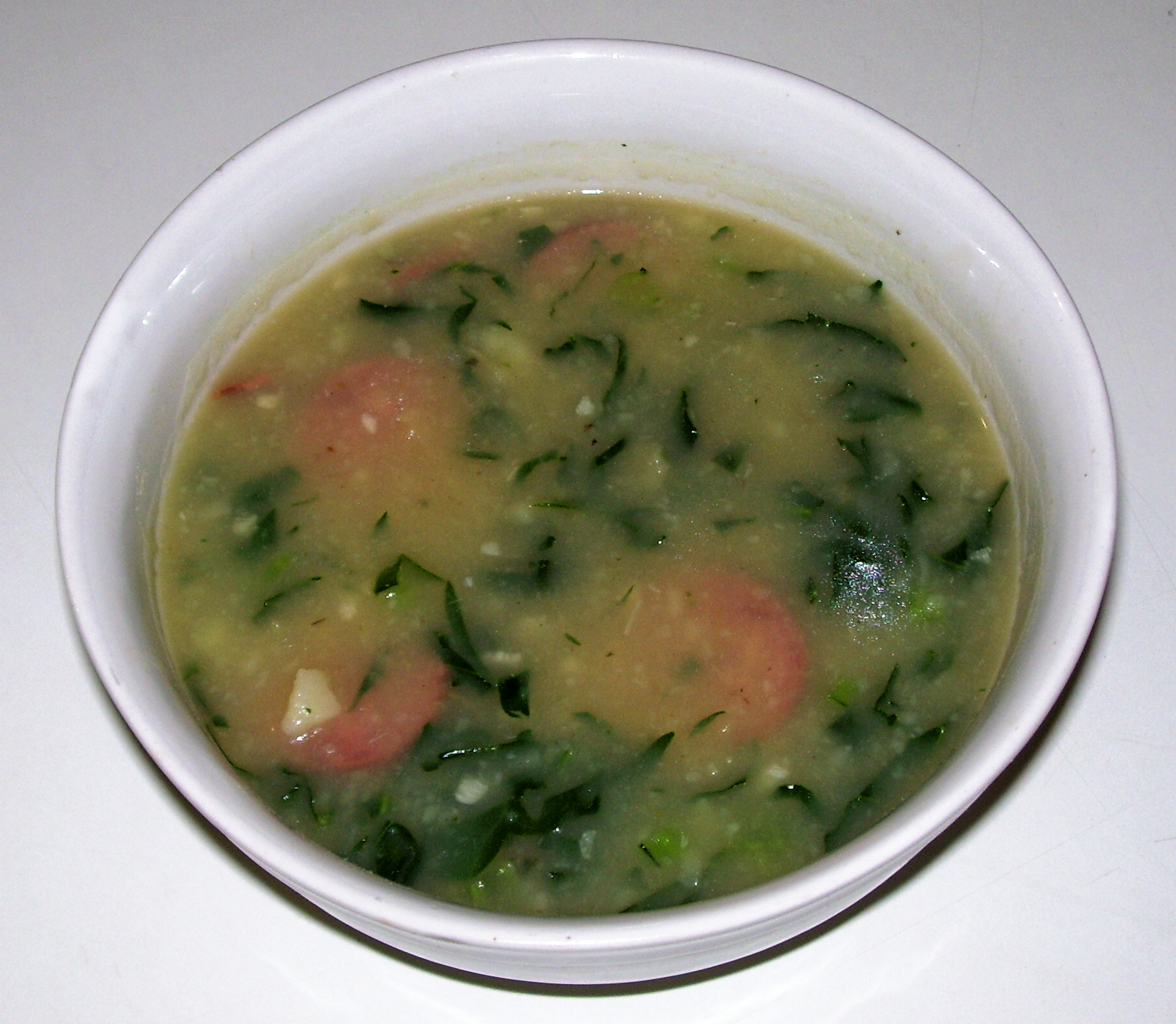
Caldo verde, a popular Portuguese soup made with collard greens

In Portuguese and Brazilian cuisine, collard greens (or couve) are a common accompaniment to fish and meat dishes. They make up a standard side dish for feijoada, a popular pork and beans-style stew. These Brazilian and Portuguese cultivars are likely members of a distinct non-heading cultivar group of Brassica oleracea, specifically the Tronchuda Group.

Thinly-sliced collard greens are also a main ingredient of a popular Portuguese soup, the caldo verde ("green broth"). For this broth, the leaves are sliced into strips, 2–3 millimetres (1/16–1/8 inch) wide (sometimes by a grocer or market vendor using a special hand-cranked slicer) and added to the other ingredients 15 minutes before it is served.

==== Kashmir Valley ====
In Kashmir, collard greens (locally called haakh) are included in most meals. Leaves are harvested by pinching in early spring when the dormant buds sprout and give out tender leaves known as kaanyil haakh. When the extending stem bears alternate leaves in quick succession during the growing season, older leaves are harvested periodically. In late autumn, the apical portion of the stem is removed along with the whorled leaves. There are several dishes made with haakh. A common dish eaten with rice is haak rus, a soup of whole collard leaves cooked simply with water, oil, salt, green chilies and spices.

==== Zimbabwe ====
In Zimbabwe, collard greens are known as umbhida in Ndebele and muriwo in Shona. Due to the climate, the plant thrives under almost all conditions, with most people growing it in their gardens. It is commonly eaten with sadza (ugali in East Africa, pap in South Africa, fufu in West Africa and polenta in Italy) as part of the staple food. Umbhida is normally wilted in boiling water before being fried and combined with sautéed onions or tomato. Some (more traditionally, the Shona people) add beef, pork and other meat to the umbhida mix for a type of stew. Most people eat umbhida on a regular basis in Zimbabwe, as it is economical and can be grown with little effort in home gardens.

== In literature ==
Collard greens are often mentioned in literature from the American South. William Faulkner mentions collard greens as part of a Southern meal in his novel Intruder In the Dust. Walker Percy mentions collard greens in his 1983 short story "The Last Donohue Show". Collards appear in Clyde Edgerton's novel Lunch at the Piccadilly. In the novel Gone With the Wind, hungry protagonist Scarlett O'Hara wistfully remembers a pre-Civil War meal that included "collards swimming richly in pot liquor iridescent with grease." In Flannery O'Connor's short story "A Stroke of Good Fortune", the main character is an unhappy working-class woman who reluctantly cooks collard greens, which she considers rustic and unrefined, for her brother.

== See also ==
- Collard liquor
