= Sukuma =

Sukuma may refer to:

- the Sukuma people
- the Sukuma language
- the Swahili name for Colewort
  - the dish sukuma wiki, of which it is the main ingredient
