= Enteromius litamba =

Conservation status
- Data Deficient (IUCN 3.1)

Scientific classification
- Kingdom: Animalia
- Phylum: Chordata
- Class: Actinopterygii
- Order: Cypriniformes
- Family: Cyprinidae
- Subfamily: Smiliogastrinae
- Genus: Enteromius
- Species: E. litamba

Binomial name
- Enteromius litamba (Keilhack, 1908)

Synonyms
- Barbus litamba Keilhack, 1908; Labeobarbus litamba (Keilhack, 1908); Barbus rhoadesii Boulenger, 1908

Species of fish

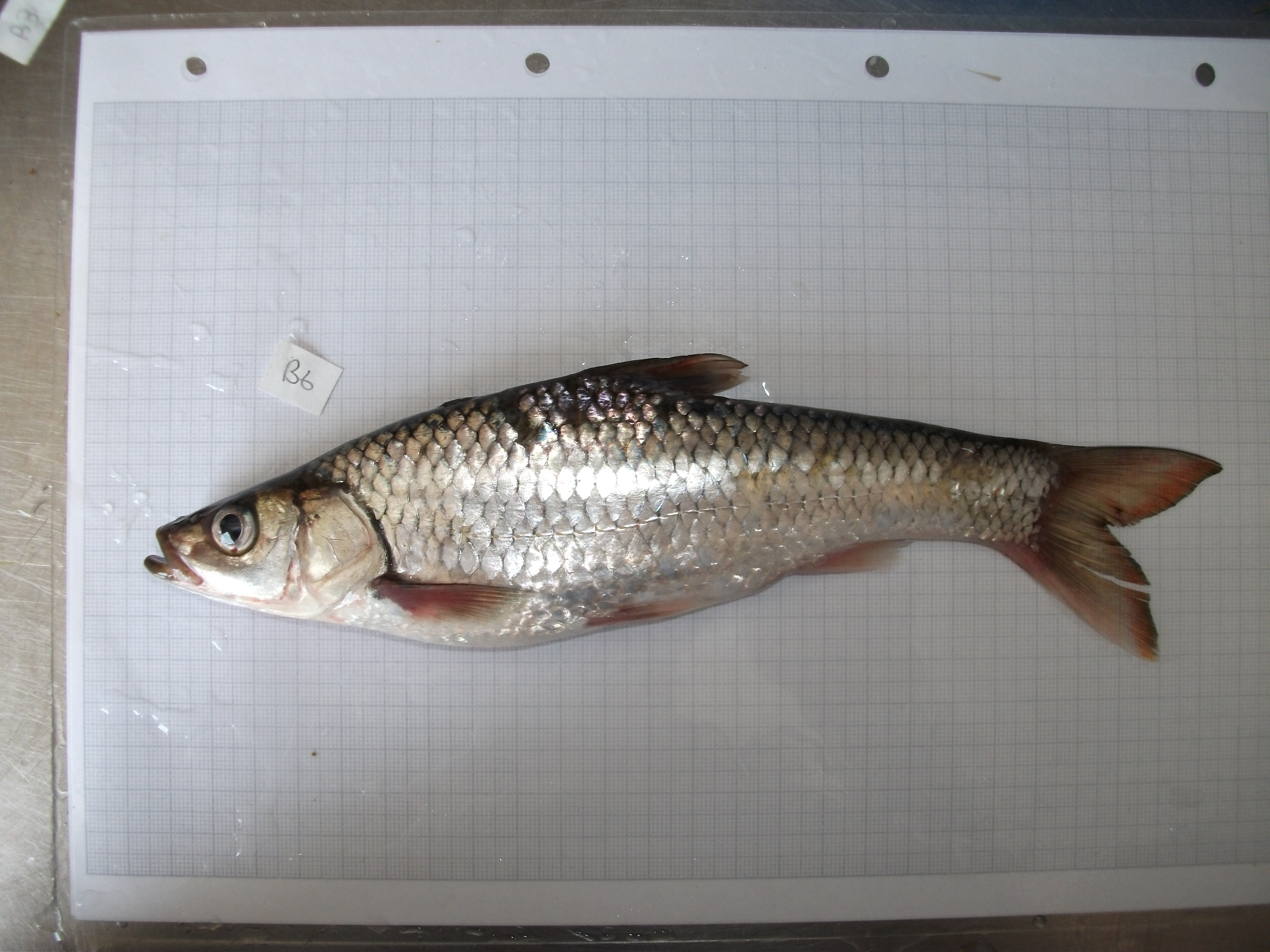
Enteromius litamba, trawled from SE Arm of Lake Malawi

Enteromius litamba is a ray-finned fish species in the family Cyprinidae. It has long been placed in Barbus, the "wastebin genus" for barbs, by default, and this is still being done by the IUCN. However, the species is increasingly being restored by some taxonomists to the related yellowfish genus Labeobarbus, others place it in the genus Enteromius. It is presumably hexaploid like the other yellowfish.

Its natural habitats are rivers and freshwater lakes. It is endemic to Lake Malawi and its river mouths in Malawi, Mozambique and Tanzania.

E. litamba is a large species. The biggest adults measure up to about 45 cm (18 in), but they usually remain well smaller. This shoaling freshwater fish prefers sandy substrates when young, while the adults occur in shoals in open waters in which they hunt search of food, although inshore waters are preferred. They are predators, eating mainly smaller fishes but also some insects (in particular when young). Its spawning grounds are not well known. But it is presumed that, like many of their relatives, they are at least somewhat potamodromous and probably move from the lake into its tributary rivers to spawn.

This species is caught for food using scoop nets, but being not as abundant as other "barbs" of Lake Malawi, it is only of local importance. It has a wide range, but may be threatened by degradation of connected stream spawning habitat, with a paucity of long-term data or observations leading the International Union for Conservation of Nature to assess the species as data deficient. A possible effect of overfishing of juveniles associated with employment of small-diameter sieves to fish for usipa has not been well studied.
