= Hlantlalala v Dyanti =

South African legal case

In Hlantlalala & Others v Dyanti NO & Another 1999 (2) SACR 541 (SCA); [1999] 4 All SA 472 (SCA) an important case in South African criminal procedure, the accused were a group of women from a rural area involved in a dispute regarding entitlement to use a piece of land. The women went on to the land and harvested mielies. The complainant charged them with theft.

The court noted the distinction between

- the right of an accused to be informed of his entitlement to legal representation, more particularly the right to apply to the Legal Aid Board for assistance and to be afforded an opportunity to seek such representation; and
- the right to obtain legal assistance at State expense.

The common law acknowledges the former and the Constitution the latter.

Furthermore, there is a duty upon judicial officers to inform unrepresented accused of their (common-law) right to legal representation. Especially where the charge is a serious one, which may merit a sentence which could be materially prejudicial to an accused, such an accused should be informed of the seriousness of the charge and of the possible consequences of conviction.

Depending on the complexity and seriousness of the charge, the accused should not only be told of his right, but should be encouraged to exercise it. He should be given a reasonable time within which to do so. He should also be told in appropriate cases that he is entitled to apply to the Legal Aid Board for assistance.

Where a judicial officer fails to advise an unrepresented accused of his (common-law) right to legal representation, an irregularity may occur. Such an irregularity does not per se result in an unfair trial, necessitating the setting aside of the conviction on appeal. The essential question is whether the verdict was tainted by the irregularity. In this regard, it is for the appellant to show that a failure of justice resulted.

An irregularity results in a failure of justice whenever there has been actual or substantial prejudice. No failure of justice will result if there is no prejudice to an accused; there will be no prejudice to the accused if he would in any event have been convicted, irrespective of the irregularity.

On the present facts, the court held that the fact that no "administrative machinery rendering free legal services" exists in the former Transkei was an irrelevant consideration in determining whether a failure of justice occurred upon the omission of a judicial officer. This was because the accused would in any event not have received "free legal services," and so could not be proffered as an excuse for denying a section of the South African society, merely because they happen to be in a particular area, rights otherwise enjoyed by the rest of the country.

The accused had a "claim of right" defence (i.e. that they were entitled to reap from the land), which they had not articulated clearly during the trial, but which a legal representative would have formulated properly. The omission was an irregularity resulting in a failure of justice and the convictions of the appellants were accordingly set aside.

This case occurred under Interim Constitution, which was not as clearcut in this area as the final Constitution. The SCA accordingly sidestepped the Constitution and decided the issue based on the common law.

== Notes ==
- Hlantlala v Dyantyi 1999 (2) SACR 541 (SCA); [1999] 4 All SA 472 (SCA)
