= Dolichodorus heterocephalus =

Scientific classification
- Domain: Eukaryota
- Kingdom: Animalia
- Phylum: Nematoda
- Class: Secernentea
- Order: Tylenchida
- Family: Dolichodoridae
- Genus: Dolichodorus
- Species: D. heterocephalus

Binomial name
- Dolichodorus heterocephalus Cobb, (1914)

Species of roundworm

Dolichodorus heterocephalus is a plant pathogenic nematode.
