= Disa zombica =

Scientific classification
- Kingdom: Plantae
- Clade: Embryophytes
- Clade: Tracheophytes
- Clade: Spermatophytes
- Clade: Angiosperms
- Clade: Monocots
- Order: Asparagales
- Family: Orchidaceae
- Subfamily: Orchidoideae
- Genus: Disa
- Species: D. zombica

Binomial name
- Disa zombica N.E.Br.

Synonyms
- Disa nyassana Schltr.

Species of flowering plant

Disa zombica is a species of orchid (family Orchidaceae), native to eastern and southern Tropical Africa. Its roots are edible and are made into a delicacy called chinaka in Malawi.
