= Ugali =

Type of maize meal made in Africa

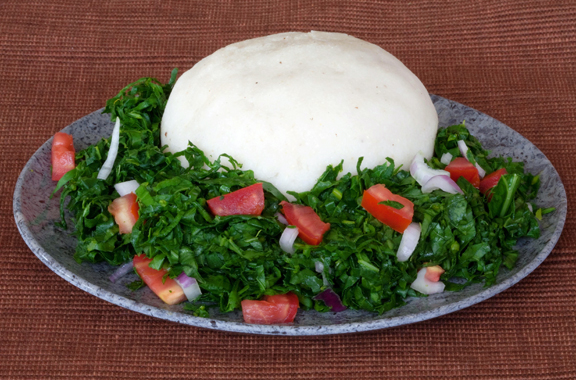
- Ugali and sukuma wiki (collard greens)
- Type: Staple
- Place of origin: West Africa; East Africa; Parts of Southern Africa
- Main ingredients: Maize meal (also known as mielie meal, or ground white maize)
- Similar dishes: Banku, fufu

Ugali, also known as posho, nsima, papa, pap, bogobe, sadza, isitshwala, akume, amawe, ewokple, akple, and other names, is a type of corn meal made from maize or corn or mahindi flour in several African countries: Kenya, Uganda, South Sudan, Tanzania, Zimbabwe, Zambia, Lesotho, Eswatini, Angola, Mozambique, Namibia, Democratic Republic of the Congo, Rwanda, Malawi, Botswana and South Africa, and in West Africa by the Ewes of Togo, Ghana, Benin, Nigeria and Ivory Coast. It is cooked in boiling water or milk until it reaches a stiff or firm dough-like consistency. In 2017, the dish was added to the UNESCO Representative List of the Intangible Cultural Heritage of Humanity, one of a few foods on the list.

== Names ==
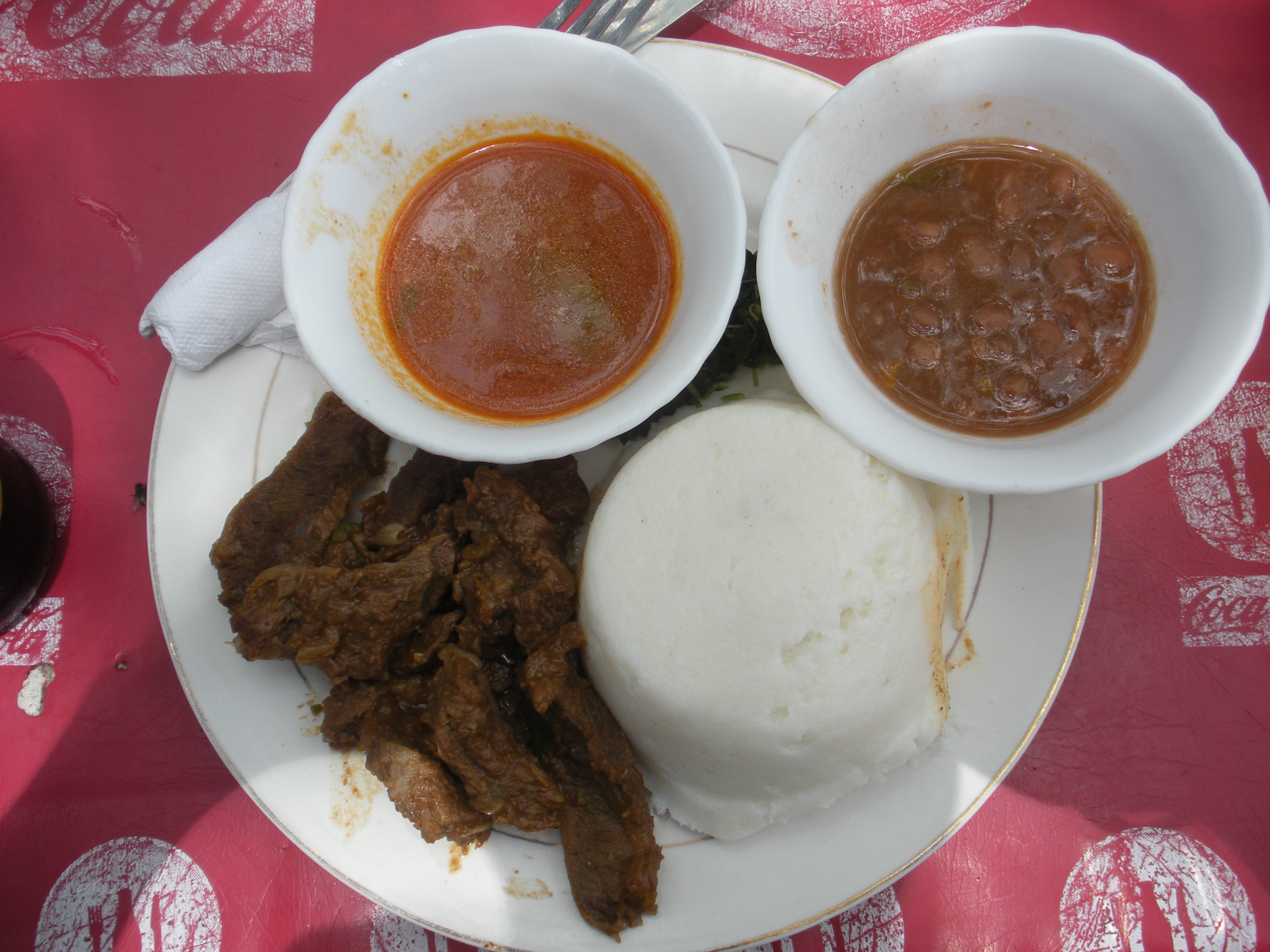
Ugali with beef and sauce

This dish is eaten widely across Africa, where it has different local names:

- Agidi – Igbo, Nigeria
- Akple – Ewe, Akumè – Mina – Togo
- Aseeda – Sudan
- Akawunga- Uganda
- Busuma [Bukusu] – Kenya
- Bando – Soga, Uganda
- Bidia – DR Congo
- Bugali – Burundi, DR Congo, Sudan, South Sudan, Rwanda
- Bogobe/Bušwa – BaPedi
- Buhobe – Lozi
- Buru – Kenya, Luo
- Busima – Bagisu, Uganda
- Chenge – Kenya, Luo
- Chima – Mozambique
- Couscous de Cameroon – Cameroon
- Dona
- Fitah – Sudan, South Sudan, Congo
- Kabato – Ivory Coast
- Fufu – Sierra Leone, Nigeria
- Funge de milho – Angola (northern)
- Isitshwala – Ndebele(Matabele)
- Isishwala – South Africa, Bhaca people
- Kawunga – Ganda, Uganda
- Kimnyet – Kalenjin, Kenya
- Kuon – Kenya, Luo
- Kwen wunga – Alur, Uganda
- La boule - Chad
- Lipalishi – Eswatini
- Uphuthu – Zulu, South Africa
- Mieliepap – Lesotho, South Africa
- Mogo – Kenya, Luo
- Moteke – DR Congo
- Mutuku – South Africa
- Nfundi – Congo
- Ngima – Kamba, Kikuyu, Embu, Kenya
- Nkima – Kenya, Meru
- Nshima – DR Congo Kasai region, Zambia
- Nsima – Malawi, Zambia
- Obokima – Kenya, Kisii
- Obusuma – Kenya, Nyole tribe
- Eko – Nigeria, Yoruba
- Oshifima – Namibia Ovambo
- Phaletšhe – Botswana, Namibia, South Africa (Setswana)
- Pap – Botswana, Namibia, South Africa
- Papa/Bogobe – Lesotho, South Africa
- Pâte or Wô [French] – Togo, Benin
- Phuthu/phalishi – Zulu people, South Africa
- Pirão – Angola (southern)
- Posho – Uganda
- Saab – Ghana, Kusasi
- Sadza – Shona
- Sakora – Nigeria
- Sakoro – Ghana
- Sembe – Tanzania, Kenya slang
- Shadza – Kalanga
- Shima
- Shishima – Zambia
- Sima – Kenya, Chewa, Tumbuka, and Ngoni
- Soor – Somalia, Zambia
- Tuozafi (or T.Z.) – Ghana
- Tuwo – Hausa, Nigeria
- Ubugali – Rwanda
- Ubwali – Bemba
- Ugali – Kenya, Malawi, Mozambique, Tanzania, Uganda, Yao, Swahili
- Um'ratha – Ndebele people, South Africa
- Upswa – Mozambique
- Bohobe – Sotho, South Africa, Lesotho
- Vhuswa – Venda people, South Africa
- Vuswa – Tsonga people, South Africa
- Wari – Mijikenda tribes, Kenyan Coast
- Xima – Mozambique

== Etymology ==
The word ugali is an African term derived from Swahili; it is also widely known as nsima in Malawian languages such as Chichewa and Chitumbuka. In parts of Kenya, the dish also goes by the informal name of sembe or ugali. In Zimbabwe it is known as sadza in Chishona or isitshwala in Ndebele The Afrikaans name (mielie) pap comes from Dutch, in which the term means "(corn) porridge".

== History ==
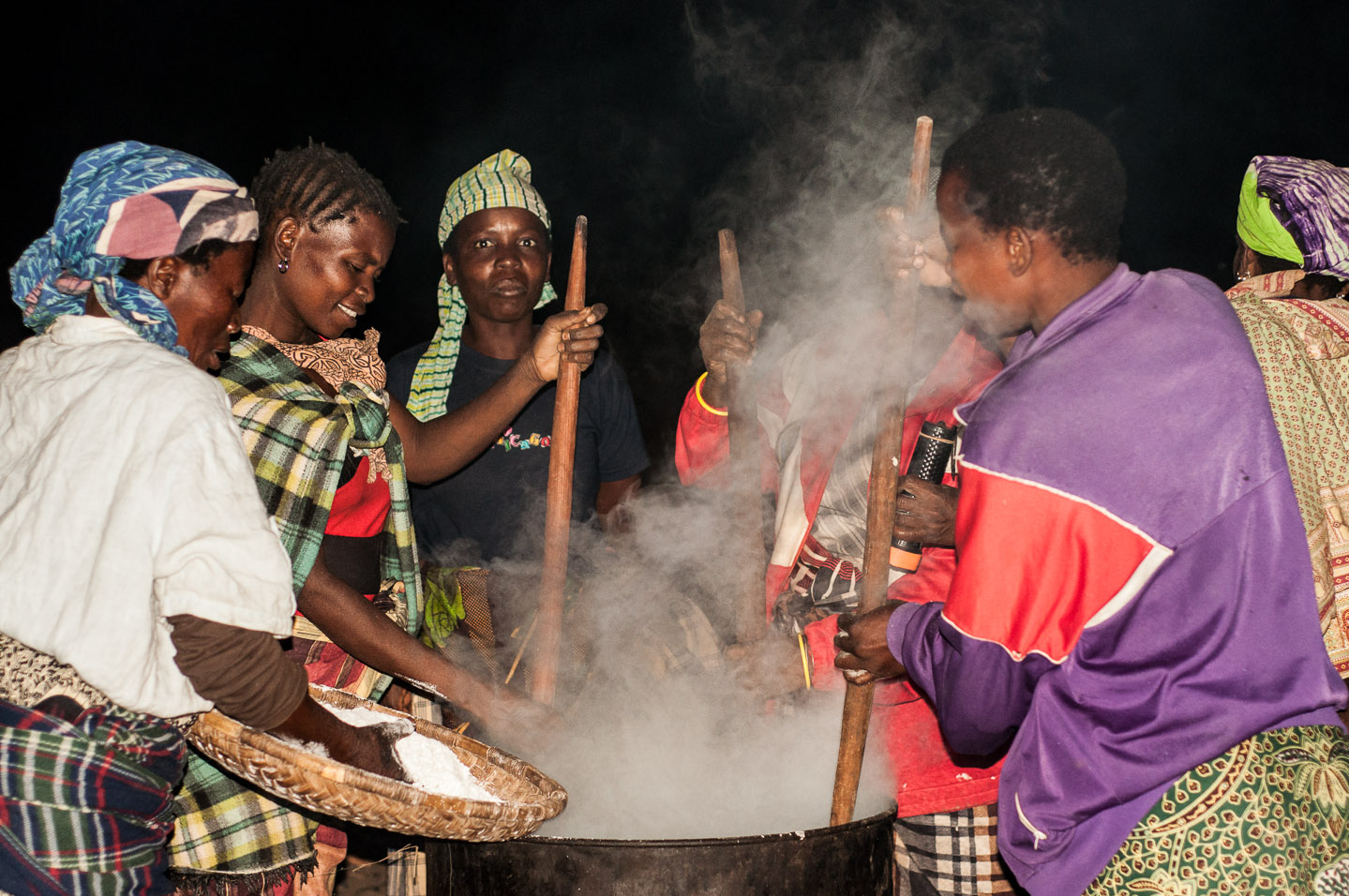
Yawo women preparing ugali for a large gathering

Ugali was introduced in Africa shortly after the Portuguese had introduced maize. Maize was introduced to Africa from the Americas between the 16th and 17th centuries. Before this, sorghum and millet were the staple cereals in most of Sub-Saharan Africa. African farmers readily accepted maize as its cultivation was very similar to that of sorghum but with significantly higher yields. Eventually, maize displaced sorghum as the primary cereal in all but the drier regions. The full replacement of these crops with maize took place in the latter half of the twentieth century. In Malawi, they have a saying "chimanga ndi moyo" which translates to "maize is life". Nshima/nsima is still sometimes made from sorghum flour though it is quite uncommon to find this. Cassava, which was also introduced from the Americas, can also be used to make nshima/nsima, either exclusively or mixed with maize flour. In Malawi nsima made from cassava (chinangwa) is localized to the lakeshore areas; however, when maize harvests are poor, cassava nsima can be found all over the country.

== Varieties ==
=== African Great Lakes ===
Ugali (when it is cooked as porridge, it is called uji) is served with sweet potatoes, ripe bananas, Irish potatoes and even bread. Solid ugali is usually served with traditional vegetables, stew or sukuma wiki (also known as collard greens). It is the most common staple starch featured in the local cuisines of the African Great Lakes region and Southern Africa. When ugali is made from another starch, it is usually given a specific regional name.

The traditional method of eating ugali (and the most common in rural areas) is to roll a lump into a ball with the right hand and then dip it into a sauce or stew of vegetables or meat. Making a depression with the thumb allows the ugali to scoop, and wrap around pieces of meat to pick them up in the same way that flatbread is used in other cultures. Leftover ugali can also be eaten with tea the following morning.

Ugali is relatively inexpensive and thus easily accessible to the poor, who usually combine it with a meat or vegetable stew (for example, sukuma wiki in Kenya) to make a filling meal. Ugali is easy to make, and the flour can last for a considerable time in average conditions.

=== Ghana ===
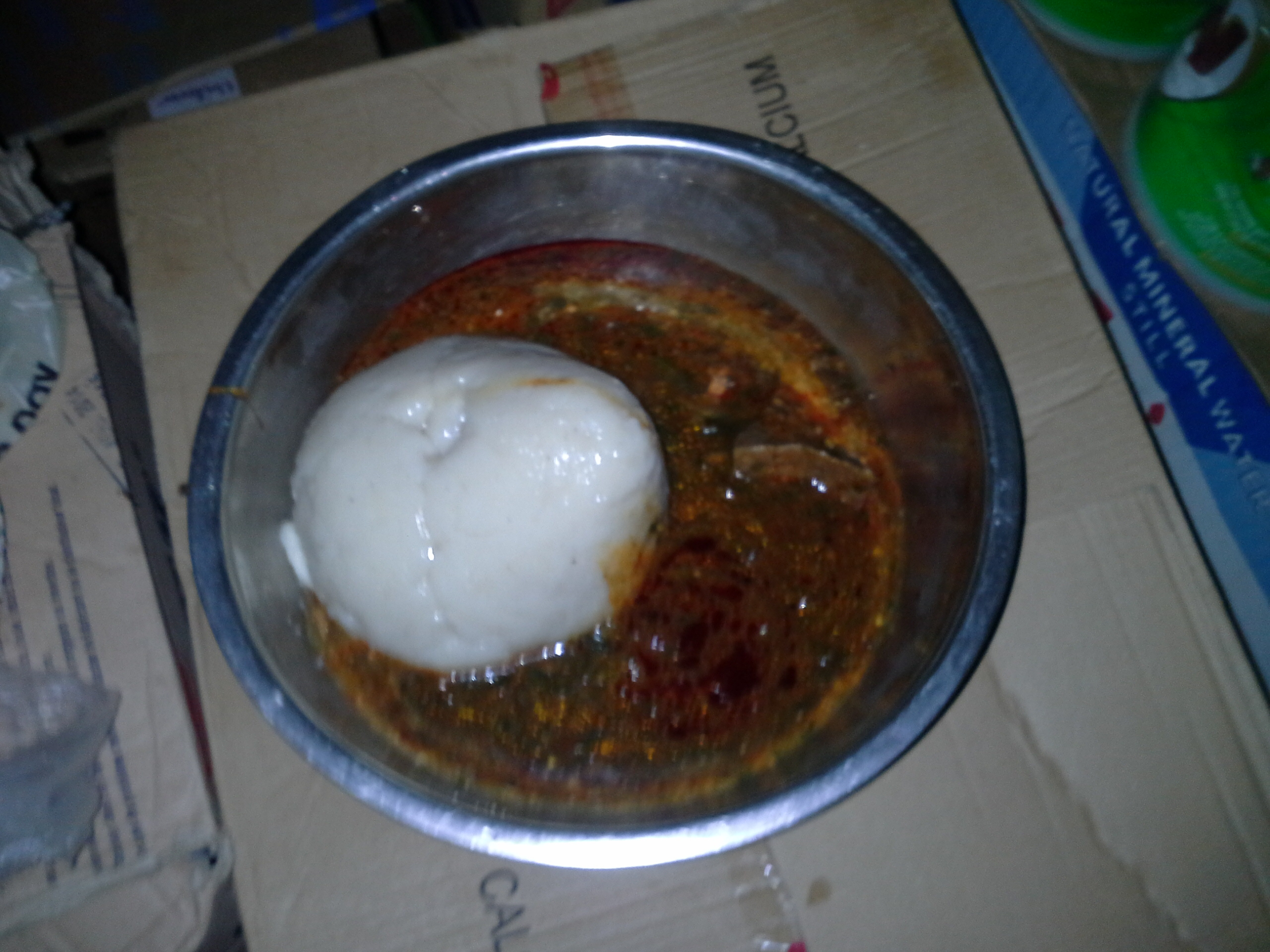
Tuo zaafi

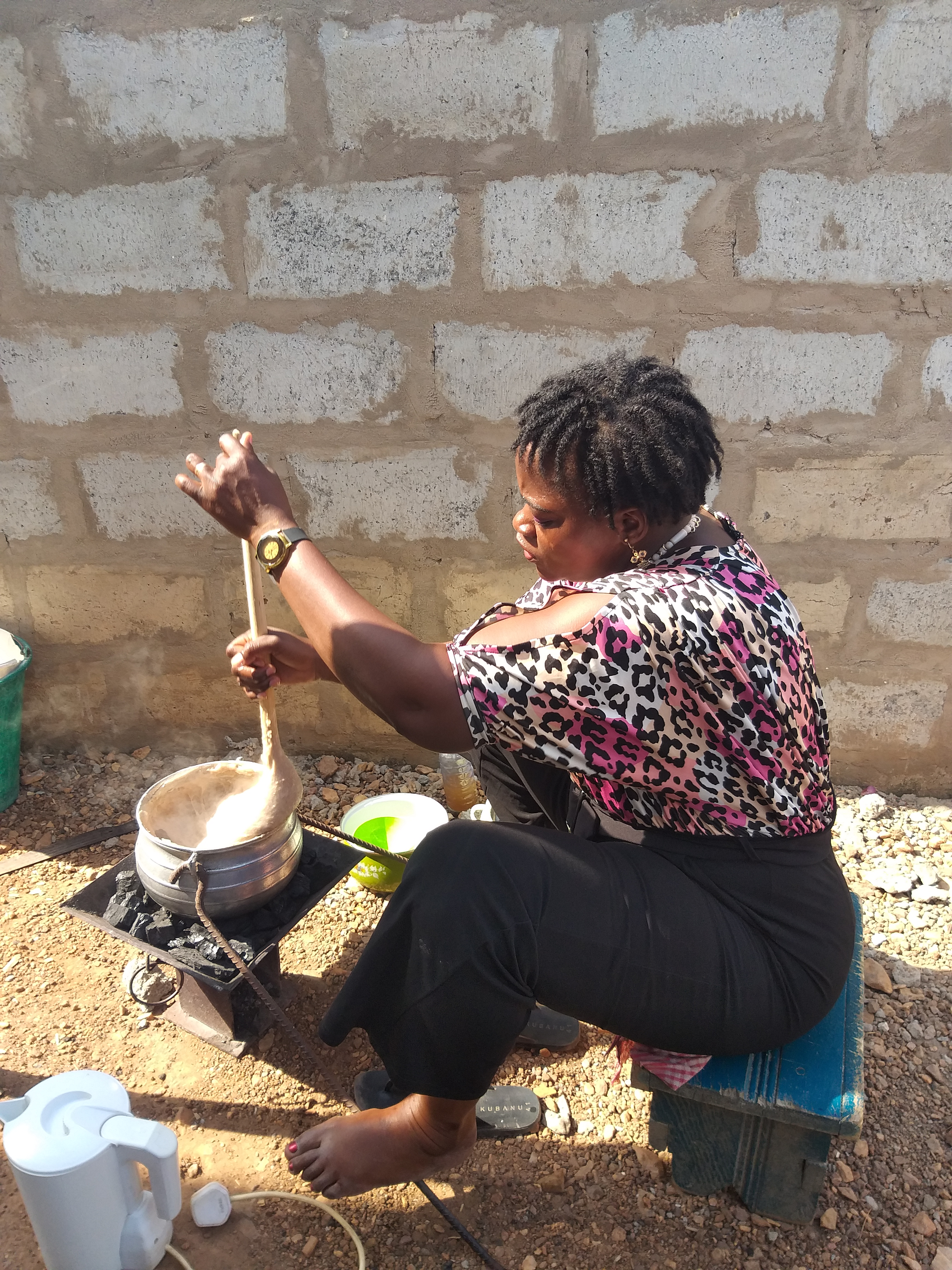
A woman stirring sagtulga

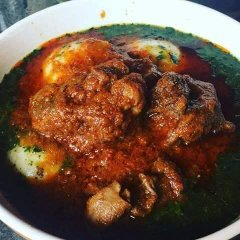
Tuo zaafi and ayoyo soup

Sagtulga (Dagbani: saɣituliga, Hausa: tuo zaafi), or diehuo, is a popular main dish for the people of Ghana. Sagtulga is a main meal eaten with soupy accompaniments such as okro soup. It is most common in the country's northern regions: Northern, Upper East, and Upper West. The dish is usually eaten for dinner, yet some people (for example, farmers and manual workers) have it for breakfast or lunch. It is usually eaten with blended Corchorus olitorius leaves (Dagbani: salinvogu, Hausa: ayoyo, molokai) and okro (Abelmoschus esculentus) with stew on the side.

The dish consists of cooked maize dough with a little dried cassava dough and water without salt. Traditionally, it is prepared with millet dough, which is indigenous to Ghana's north.

It is mainly eaten with green vegetable soup made from bitter leaves, or sometimes freshly pounded cassava leaves. It can be accompanied with a variety of soups, including okra and groundnut soup.

=== Kenya ===
In Luhya culture, it is the most common staple starch, but it is also a key part of Luhya wedding traditions; obusuma prepared from millet (known as obusuma bwo bule) was traditionally included among delicacies on a bride's high table. Obusuma can also be prepared from other starches like sorghum or cassava (obusuma bwo 'muoko). Obusuma is commonly served with tsimboka, or etsiswa, eliani (vegetables), inyama (meat), inyeni (fish), thimena (whitebait) or omrere (jute leaves). For distinguished guests or visitors, it is usually served with ingokho (chicken).

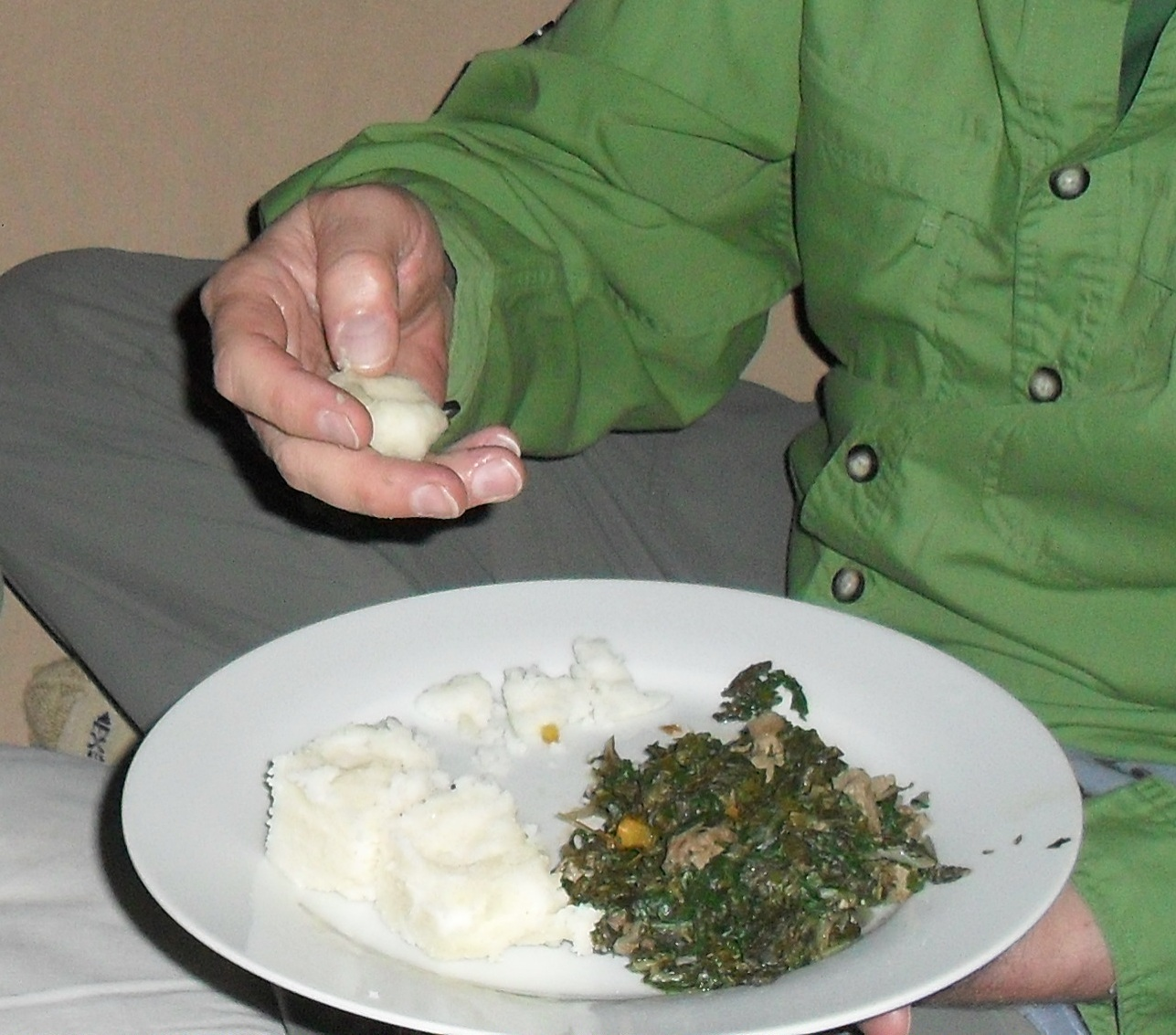
Eating ugali in Kenya

Ugali is prepared from ground white corn similar to how tamales are made from yellow corn in Central America. In most homes the ugali makes up most of the meal, with vegetables or meat as accompaniments. In wealthier homes, or for special occasions, the ugali is served with abundant savory vegetables and meats in spicy gravy. It resembles mashed potatoes served in American homes. In Kenya, a smidgen of thick ugali is grasped in hand and the thumb is depressed in the center to form a spoon for scooping—a form of edible silverware. While the thumb and fingers may get a bit messy with this method, the way of eating food is culturally significant in the region.

=== Malawi, Zambia ===
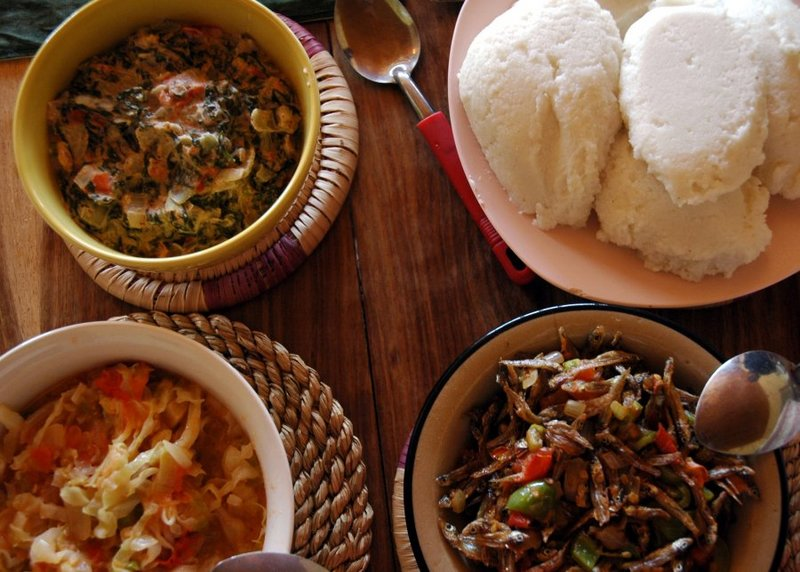
Nsima (top right corner) with three relishes

Nsima is a dish made from maize flour (white cornmeal) and water and is a staple food in Zambia (nsima/ubwali) and Malawi (nsima).

The maize flour is first boiled with water into a porridge, and, in Zambia, left to simmer for a few minutes before it is 'paddled', to create a thick paste with the addition of more flour. This process requires the maker to pull the thick paste against the side of a pot with a flat wooden spoon (nthiko in Malawi, m'tiko/umwiko in Zambia) quickly whilst it continues to sit over the heat. Once cooked the resulting nshima/nsima is portioned using a wooden/plastic spoon dipped in water or coated in oil called a chipande (Malawi), and chipampa (Zambia). In Malawi each of these portions is called a ntanda.

Nsima is always eaten with side dishes, known as "relish". These can be mushrooms such as kabansa, tente, chitondo, and ichikolowa; protein sources such as game, beef, poultry, fish, groundnuts (peanuts), chikanda (orchid and peanut dish), beans; and vegetables such as pumpkin leaves, bean leaves, white garden eggs known as impwa in Zambia (these are small oblong shaped white solanum fruit), amaranth leaves, mustard leaves, cabbage, etc. In Zambia, side dishes are called ndiyo in Nyanja/Chewa and umunani in Bemba. Ndiwo in Malawi refers to the protein dishes and the vegetable sides are known as masamba. The protein dishes are usually grilled, or in the form of stew. In both Malawi and Zambia, nsima is often eaten with dried fish (utaka, Malawi) or dried vegetables. Hot peppers or condiments like homemade hot pepper sauces from peri-peri or Kambuzi chili peppers or commercial chili sauces like Nali Sauce are usually served with the nshima meal.

Traditionally, diners sit around a table or on the floor surrounding the meal. The diners have to wash their hands as nshima/nsima is eaten with bare hands. This is done with a bowl of water. Alternatively the host or one of the younger people present pours water from a jug over the hands of the elders or guests into a bowl. Eating is done by taking a small lump into one's right palm, rolling it into a ball and dipping it into the relish. Using the right thumb to indent the nshima ball is a technique used by advanced nshima diners in order to easily scoop the relish or sauce of the dish. In Zambia, umuto (Bemba language) refers to the drippings/broth/sauce of a side dish or stew; and the act of scooping an ample amount of it with a nshima ball is called inkondwa. The statement, "umuto wankondwa" loosely translates to "sauce to allow for inkondwa". As with many African traditions, age is very important. Washing before the meal, eating, and washing after the meal generally starts with the oldest person, followed by everyone else in turn by age.

Nsima is relatively cheap and affordable for most of the population, although occasionally prices have risen due to shortages, contributing to economic and political instability.

=== Nigeria ===
In Nigeria, akamu, ogi or koko has a consistency similar to that of American pudding. It is referred to as "pap" in Nigerian English. Ogi/akamu in Nigeria is generally accompanied with "moin moin", a bean pudding, or "akara", which is a bean cake. There is also the thicker variety, called eko among the Yorubas and agidi among the Igbos. The pudding is cooked on heat until it is thick. It is traditionally wrapped in leaves with botanical name Thaumatococcus daniellii. Yorubas call it ewe eran while the Igbos call it akwukwo elele. It is usually paired with a variety of vegetable soups and sauces for a light meal or it can be eaten with beans or their byproducts.

=== South Africa ===
Pap, /ˈpʌp/, also known as mieliepap (Afrikaans for maize porridge) in South Africa, is a traditional porridge similar to polenta and a staple food of the African peoples of Southern Africa (the Afrikaans word pap is taken from Dutch and means merely "porridge") made from mielie-meal (coarsely ground maize). Many traditional Southern African dishes include pap, such as smooth maize meal porridge (also called slap pap or soft porridge), pap with a very thick consistency that can be held in hand (stywe pap or firm porridge) and a more dry crumbly phuthu pap (Afrikaans: krummelpap). Phuthu dishes are usually found in the coastal areas of South Africa.

A variety of savouries can be used to accompany pap, made from green vegetables, and flavored with chili.

South Africans in the northern parts of South Africa eat it as the breakfast staple, with milk, butter, and sugar (soft porridge), but also serve it with meat and tomato stew (usually tomato and onion) at other meals. When they have a braai, bogobe or stywe (stiff) pap with a savoury sauce like tomato and onion or mushroom is an important part of the meal. Phutu pap is popularly served with boerewors, a combination that later became known as pap en wors (also called "pap en vleis", which can include other braaied or stewed meats).

In the Cape Province of South Africa, it is almost exclusively seen as a breakfast food. Since mielie-meal is inexpensive, poor people combine it with vegetables. It can be served hot or, after it has cooled, it can be fried. Phutu porridge is sometimes eaten with chakalaka as a side dish with braais.

In the northern provinces pap is usually soft and made using a fermented maize batter, which prevents the pap from spoiling quickly given that northern provinces are much hotter than the south.

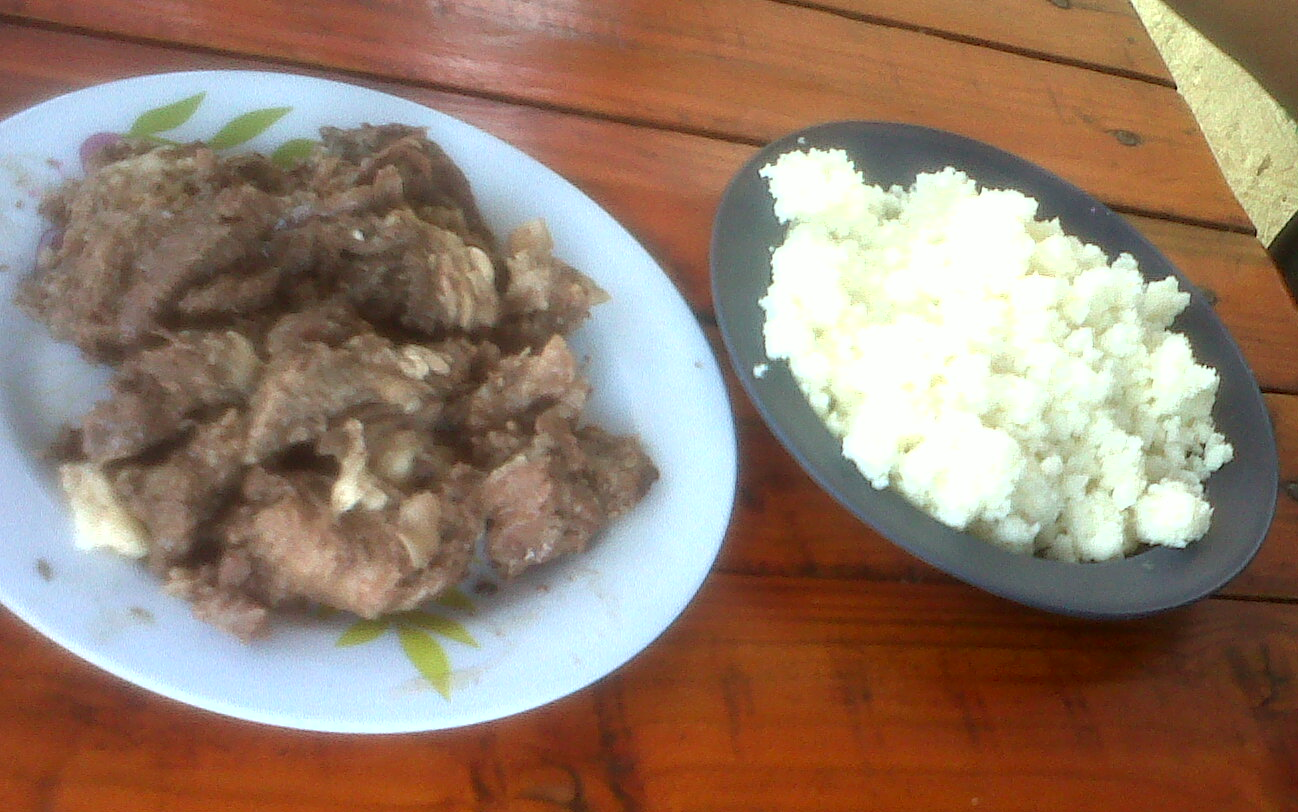
A dish of uphuthu (right) served with skop (meat from the head of a cow)

Uphuthu is a South African method of cooking mielie-meal whereby the end product is a finely textured coarse grain-like meal which is typically eaten with an accompaniment of vegetables and meat, in KwaZulu-Natal and Eastern Cape regions of South Africa or as the star of the dish with amasi or maas in the Gauteng regions. Some cultures add sugar to uphuthu and amasi to produce a sweet snack that resembles cereal; however, the corn-based stable is typically eaten as is with amasi.

Phuthu or Uphuthu (/ˈpʊtuː/), also incorrectly spelled as putu or phutu, is a traditional preparation method of maize meal in South African cuisine. It is a crumbly or grainy type of pap or porridge, eaten by most cultural groups in South Africa. Phuthu is often eaten with meat, beans, gravy and sour milk.

The texture and consistency of uphuthu is often a deciding factor in what dishes will accompany it. For example, amasi or maas is usually prepared with a more finely textured phuthu, whereas stews and curries are often served with a more clumped variety, leaning towards stiff-pap. Finely-textured phuthu has a tendency of being severely dehydrated (dry), depending on the cook's skill in working the dish. Such a severely dehydrated phuthu would often be served with stews, leafy vegetables, and many other savoury dishes containing moisture. Conversely, such dehydrated phuthu would not be suited to a dish of amasi or maas, because the steeping or soaking process would result in a paste-like dish, whereas amasi is preferred to be chewy.

=== Zimbabwe ===
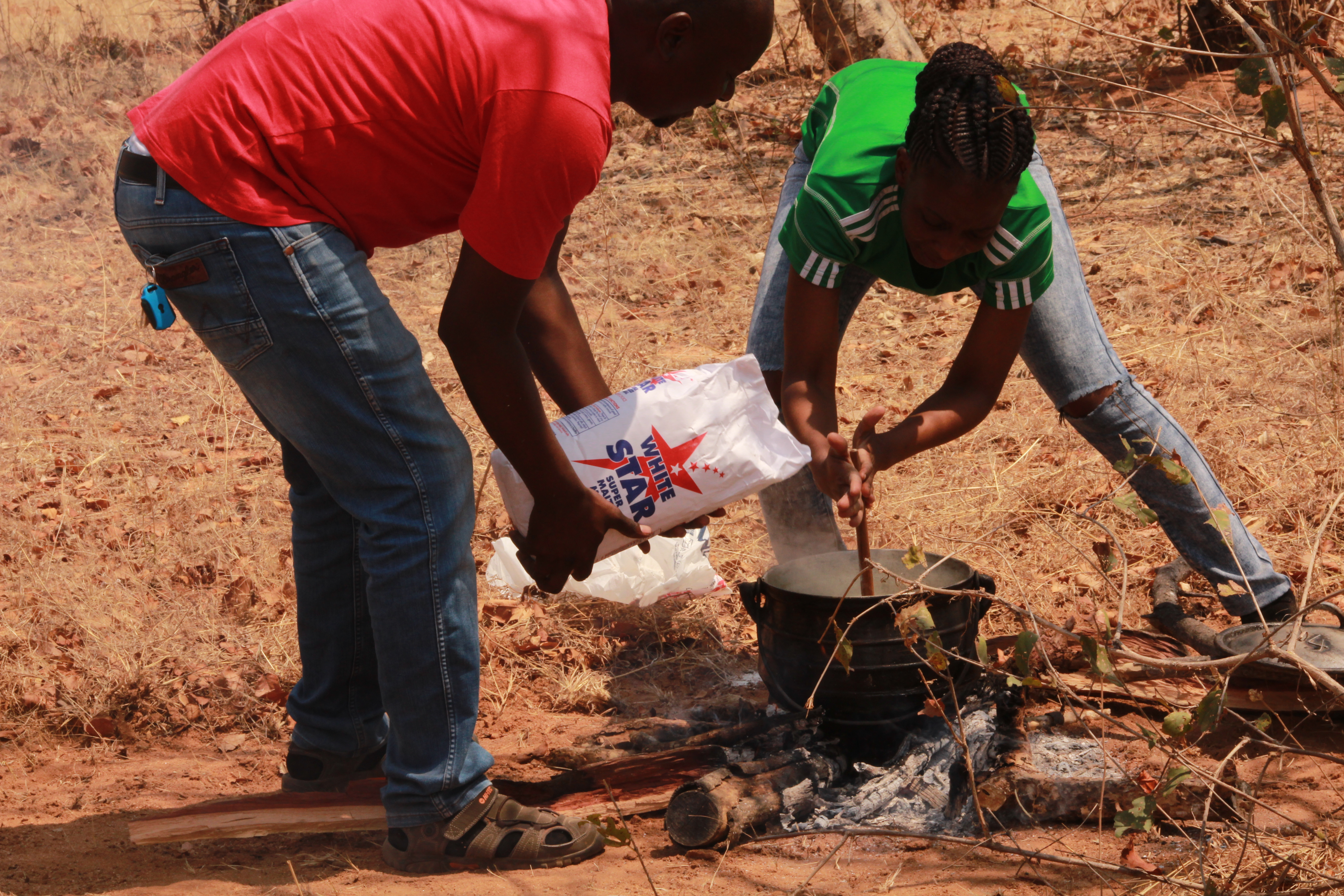
A man and a woman cooking sadza in Botswana (Domboshaba cultural festival 2017)

Sadza in Shona or isitshwala in isiNdebele is a cooked maize meal that is the staple food in Zimbabwe.

Sadza is made with finely ground dry maize/corn maize (mealie-meal). This maize meal is referred to as impuphu in Ndebele or hupfu in Shona. Despite the fact that maize is an imported food crop to Zimbabwe (c. 1890), it has become the chief source of carbohydrate and the most popular meal for indigenous people. Locals either purchase the mealie meal in retail outlets or produce it in a grinding mill from their own maize.

Zimbabweans prefer white maize meal. However, during times of famine or hardship, they resorted to eating yellow maize meal, which is sometimes called "Kenya", because it was once imported from that nation. Before the introduction of maize, sadza was made from mapfunde finger millet. In recent times, young people in Zimbabwe tend to prefer rice to sadza or isitshwala. The Grain Millers Association of Zimbabwe (GMAZ) National Chairman Tafadzwa Musarara commented that the future working class will be eating less sadza and more rice and bread as alternatives.

Sadza is typically served on individual plates, but traditionally sadza was eaten from a communal bowl, a tradition that is still maintained by some families mainly in the rural areas. It is generally eaten with the right hand without the aid of cutlery, often rolled into a ball before being dipped into a variety of condiments such as sauce/gravy, sour milk, or stewed vegetables.

Notable foods eaten with sadza include:

Meat is known as nyama in Shona.

- Red meat – includes beef, mutton, goat and game meat
- Cow hoof – mazondo, amanqgina
- Oxtail
- Other foods including intestine (tripe), offal, zvemukati (includes mathumbu, maphaphu, isibindi, utwane, ulusu, umbendeni; in Shona known as matumbu), sun-dried vegetables known as mfushwa and many more
- White meat – includes huku – chicken meat, fish
- Fish (hove in Shona), including the small dried fish kapenta
- Mopane worms/madora – edible moth caterpillar
- Collard greens – known as imibhida in the Ndebele language, muriwo in the Shona language
- Sugar beans – known as nyemba in Shona
- Cabbage
- Derere – okra
- Cleome gynandra (ulude in Ndebele)/nyevhe in Shona
- Pumpkin – leaves known as muboora in Shona
- Soured milk natural yogurt (known as amasi in Ndebele or Nguni languages in South Africa, mukaka wakakora in Shona, or lacto)
- Soya chunks
- Soups and stews

== Similar dishes ==
Similar dishes are polenta from northern Italy, gh'omi (ღომი) from Georgia, and grits in the southern United States.

Fufu, a starch-based food from West and Central Africa, may also be made from maize meal, in which case it may be called fufu corn. In the Caribbean, similar dishes are cou-cou (Barbados), funchi (Curaçao and Aruba), and funjie (Virgin Islands). It is known as funche in Puerto Rican cuisine and mayi moulin in Haitian cuisine.

Dishes similar to pap include banku, isidudu, and umngqusho.

== Gallery ==
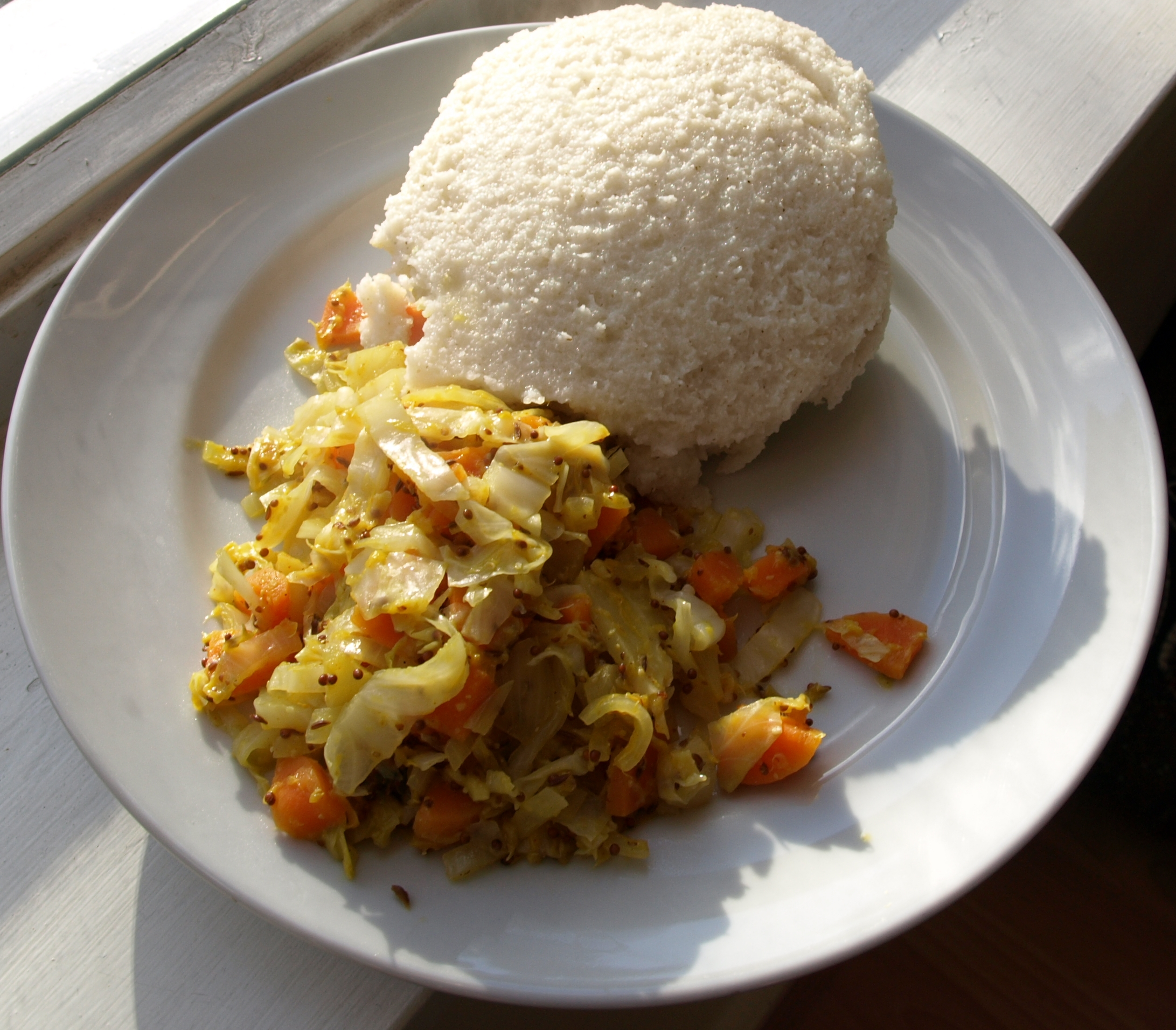
Ugali and cabbage

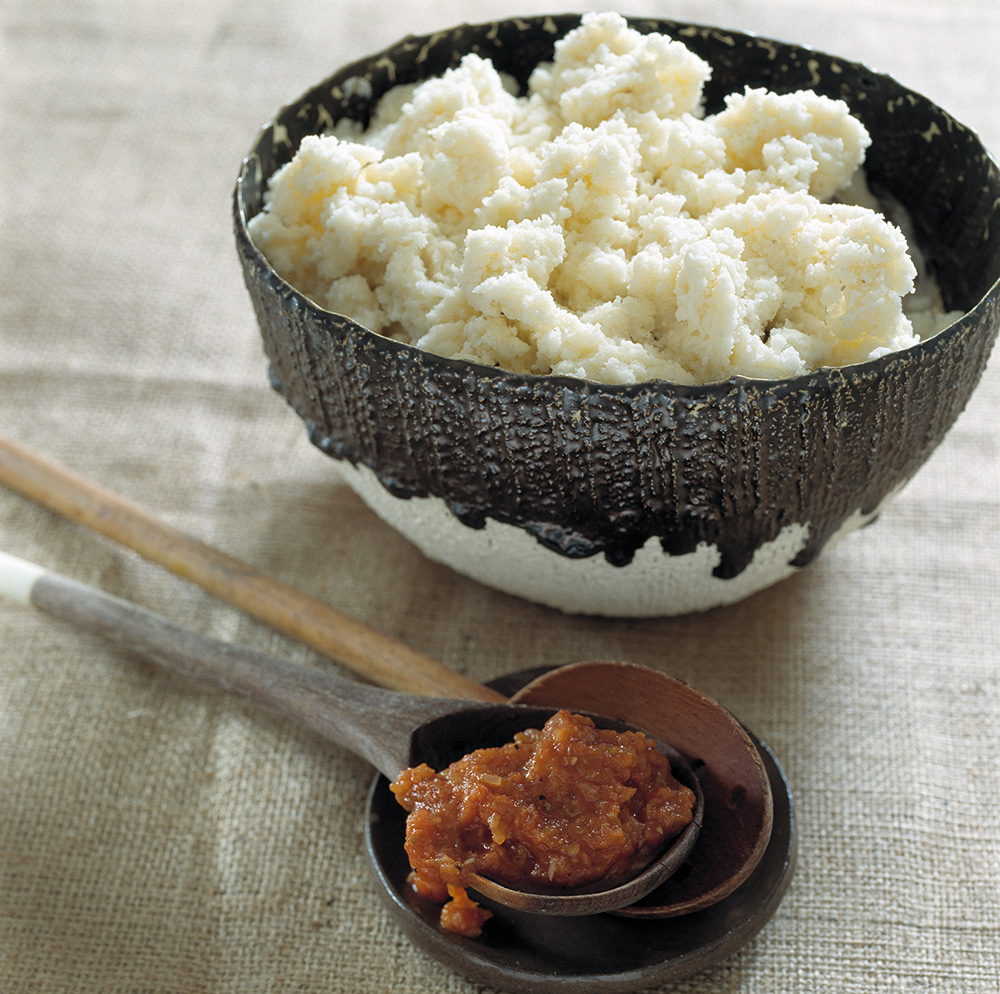
Phutu, pictured with tomato-based relish in the foreground

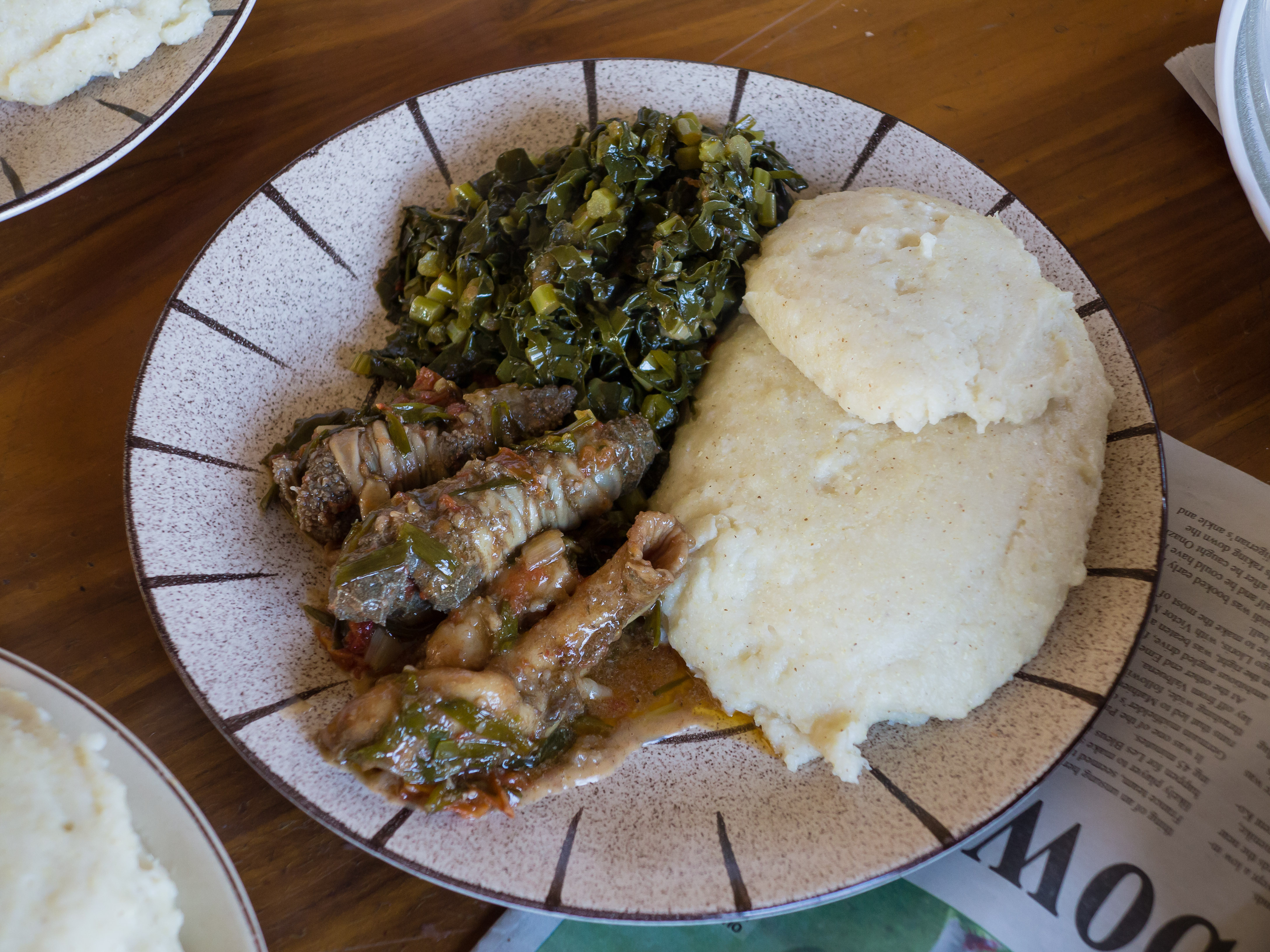
A meal of sadza (right), greens, and goat offal. The goat's small intestines are wrapped around small pieces of large intestines before cooking.

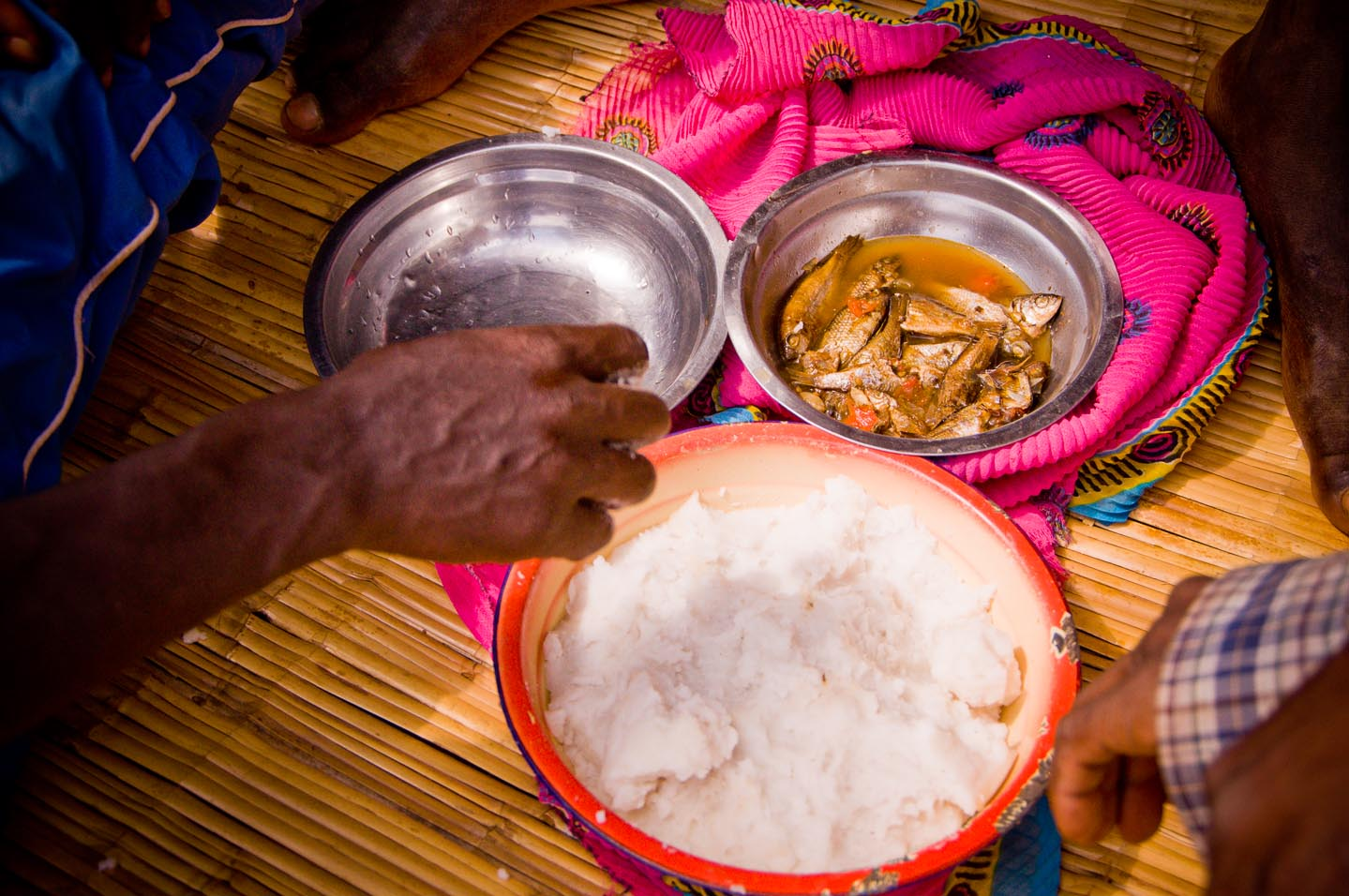
Ugali and usipa (small fish), staples of the Yawo people of the African Great Lakes

== See also ==
- Chapati
- Cornmeal
- List of African dishes
- List of maize dishes
- List of porridges
- List of soups
- Malawian cuisine
- Moin moin
- Mămăliga
- Tuareg food
