= Pot liquor =

Liquid remaining after boiling greens

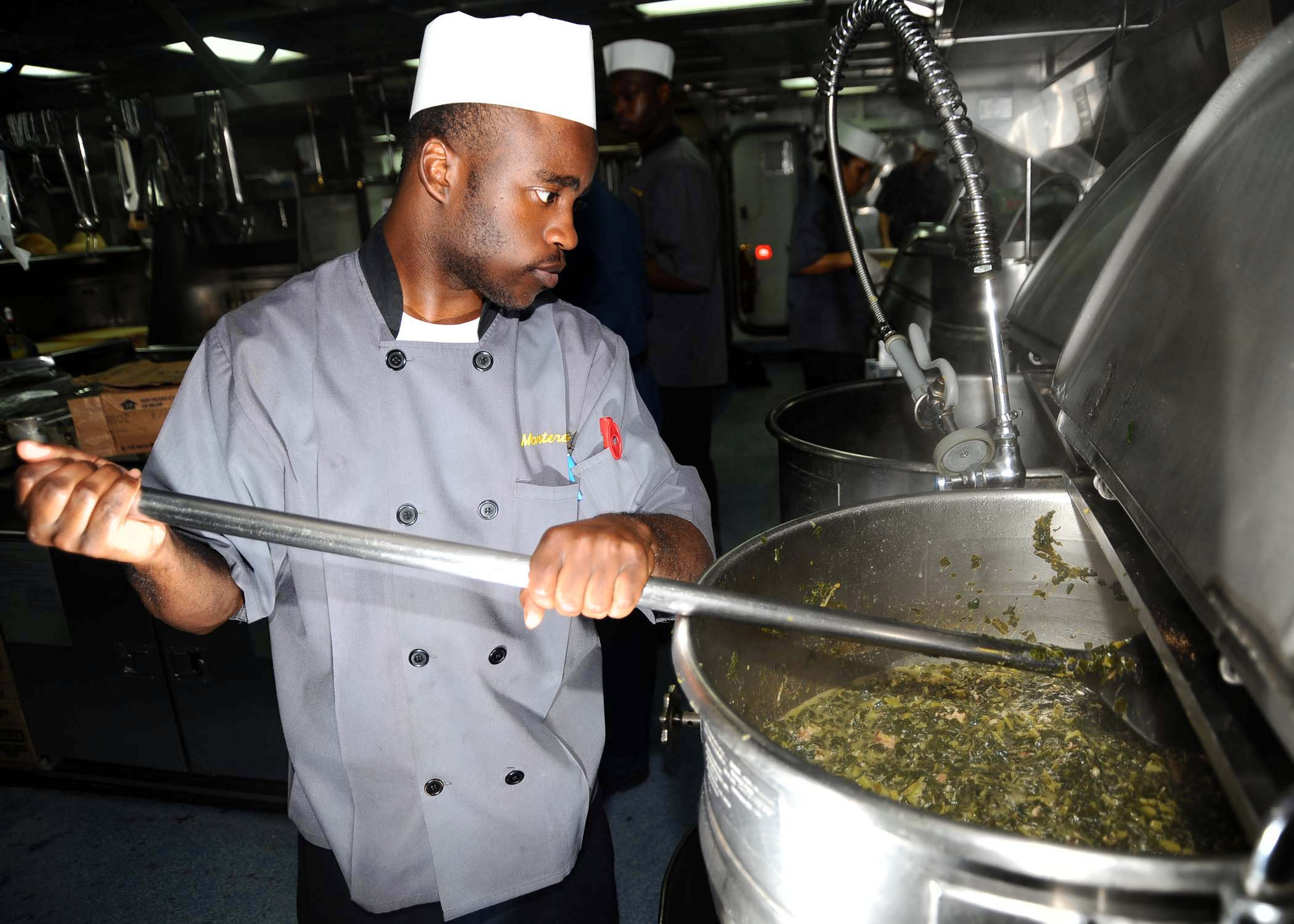
- Boiling collard greens
- Alternative names: potlikker, collard liquor
- Type: Soup
- Place of origin: United States
- Region or state: Southern United States
- Main ingredients: Liquid from boiling greens (collard greens, mustard greens, turnip greens); sometimes salt, smoked pork or smoked turkey

Pot liquor, sometimes spelled potlikker or pot likker, is the liquid that is left behind after boiling greens (collard greens, mustard greens, turnip greens) or beans. It is sometimes seasoned with salt and pepper, smoked pork or smoked turkey. Pot liquor contains high amounts of essential vitamins and minerals including iron, vitamin A and vitamin C.

In the Canadian province of Newfoundland and Labrador, the term pot liquor is used to describe the broth left over from boiling multiple vegetables (potato, carrot, cabbage, etc.), usually with the dish known as Jiggs Dinner.

== Background ==
The consumption of potlikker was common among enslaved people in the United States to concentrate nutrients from vegetables. Most people crumble cornpone (corn meal mixed with a little salt and water, made into a patty and baked until it is hard) into the potlikker.

=== Southern Culture ===
In 1935, governor and U.S. senator Huey Pierce Long, Jr., of Louisiana presented a treatise on potlikker during a 15-hour filibuster. In his autobiography, Every Man a King, he defined "potlikker", a favorite of his country political supporters, as

... the juice that remains in a pot after greens or other vegetables are boiled with proper seasoning. The best seasoning is a piece of salt fat pork, commonly referred to as "dry salt meat" or "side meat". If a pot be partly filled with well-cleaned turnip greens and turnips (which should be cut up), with a half-pound piece of the salt pork and then with water and boiled until the greens and turnips are cooked reasonably tender, then the juice remaining in the pot is the delicious, invigorating, soul-and-body sustaining potlikker ... which should be taken as any other soup and the greens eaten as any other food...

Earlier, in 1931, Long's insistence on dunking his cornpone in the potlikker stimulated wide debate on whether crumbling or dunking was the correct method of immersion, with comments made by Emily Post and New York City mayor Jimmy Walker. Long's pro-dunking stance met with uniform opposition from other governors including Benjamin M. Miller of Alabama, John Garland Pollard of Virginia, and William H. Murray of Oklahoma. The governor of New York state, Franklin D. Roosevelt, wrote a letter to the "Potlikker and Cornpone Editor of The Atlanta Constitution," endorsing crumbling.

Former governor and U.S. senator Zell Miller of Georgia wrote a defense of the traditional spelling "potlikker" in a letter to The New York Times.

== See also ==
- Reduction
- Stock
