= Dolichodoridae =

Scientific classification
- Kingdom: Animalia
- Phylum: Nematoda
- Class: Secernentea
- Order: Tylenchida
- Family: Dolichodoridae; Siddiqi, 1986

Subfamilies
- Belonolaiminae; Brachydorinae; Dolichodorinae; Macrotrophurinae; Meiodorinae; Merliniinae; Telotylenchinae

Synonyms
- Meioderidae; Meiodoridae; Merliniidae; Telotylenchidae; Tylenchorhychidae; Tylenchorhynchidae; Tylenorhynchidae

Family of roundworms

Dolichodoridae is a family of nematodes belonging to the order Tylenchida.

== Description ==
The Dolichodoridae is a family of medium to large nematodes 1 to 3 mm in length.

== Subclassification ==
The following subclassification is given by Etienne Geraert in his The Dolichodoridae of the World. In it, he includes several subfamilies which contain genera considered part of the separate families such as Belonolaimidae by other taxonomists, such as Belonolaimus and Tylenchorhynchus.

Subfamily Belonolaiminae

- Genus Belonolaimus
- Genus Carphodorus
- Genus Ibipora
- Genus Morulaimus

Subfamily Brachydorinae

- Genus Brachydorus

Subfamily Dolichodorinae

- Genus Dolichodorus
- Genus Neodolichodorus

Subfamily Macrotrophurinae

- Genus Macrotrophurus

Subfamily Merliniinae

- Genus Ampimerlinus
- Genus Geocenamus
- Genus Nagelus

Subfamily Telotylenchinae

- Genus Histotylenchus
- Genus Neodolichorynchus
- Genus Paratrophurus
- Genus Quinisulcius
- Genus Sauertylenchus
- Genus Telotylenchus
- Genus Trichotylenchus
- Genus Trophurus
- Genus Tylenchorhynchus
