= Delele =

African dish

Delele is a Zimbabwean, Zambian, north-eastern Botswana and Northern South African dish made from a local plant of the same name, and often eaten with sadza or phaletšhe or Vhuswa. The English word for delele is okra. Okra is also referred to as "derere". It is prepared with baking soda and well known for its slimy texture. Delele can be dried before cooking, but more frequently it is cooked fresh.

The Vha-Venda people of South Africa cook the leaves of Corchorus olitorius in a similar manner. The dish goes well with vhuswa (pap or maize meal).

== Description ==
Okra is a herbaceous, hairy annual plant of the mallow family (Malvaceae) and it is an edible food. Not to be confused with Delele. These are two different plants

== See also ==
- List of African dishes
