= Sukuma wiki =

East African dish made with collard greens

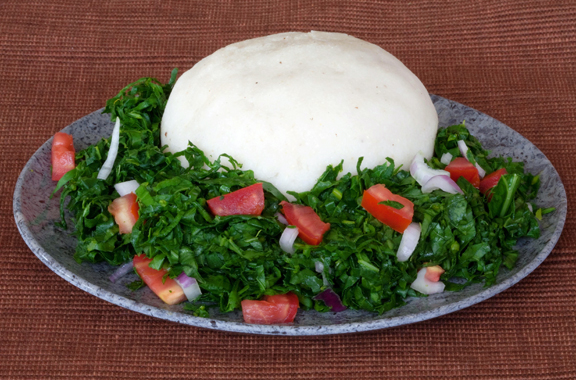
Ugali and sukuma wiki

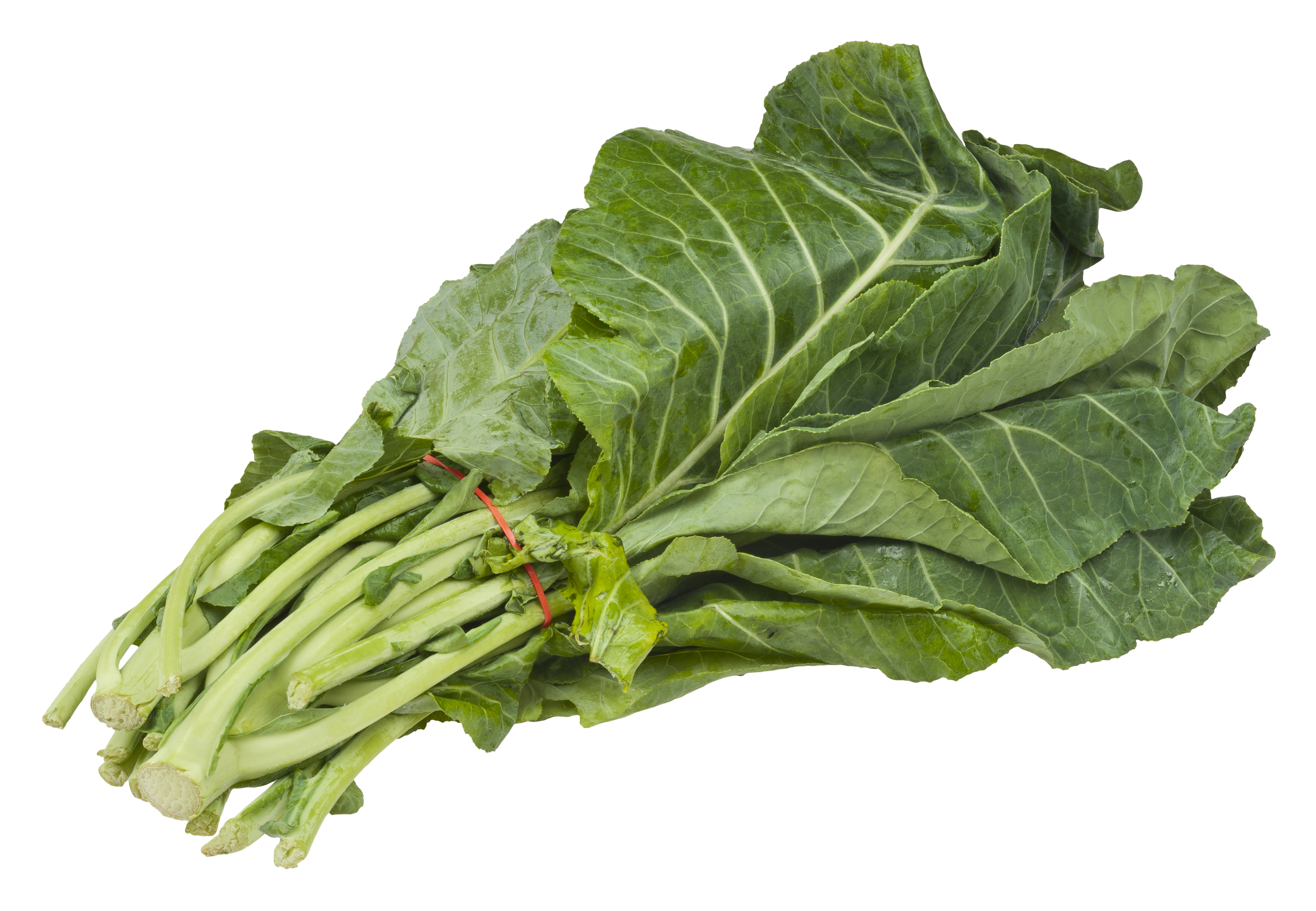
A bundle of sukuma (collard greens)

Sukuma wiki is an East African dish made with collard greens, known as sukuma, cooked with onions and spices. It is often served and eaten with ugali (made from maize flour).

In Tanzania, Kenya, Uganda and other parts of East Africa, colewort are more commonly known by their Swahili name, sukuma, and are often referred to as collard greens. It is also commonly mistaken for kale.

The literal translation of the phrase 'sukuma wiki' is to "push the week" or "stretch the week". It is a vegetable that is generally affordable and available all-year round in this region. It forms part of the staple dish in this region together with ugali or sima. Sukuma is also known as "agaar" in the Somali language and is part of Somali culture.

== Description ==
The cultivar group name Acephala ("without a head" in Greek) refers to the fact that this variety of B. oleracea does not have the usual close-knit core of leaves (a "head") like cabbage. The plant is a biennial where winter frost occurs, and perennial in even colder regions. It is also moderately sensitive to salinity. It has an upright stalk, often growing up to two feet tall. The plant is very similar and closely related to kale. The preparation is different from traditional preparation of collard greens in the United States.

== Cultivation and storage ==
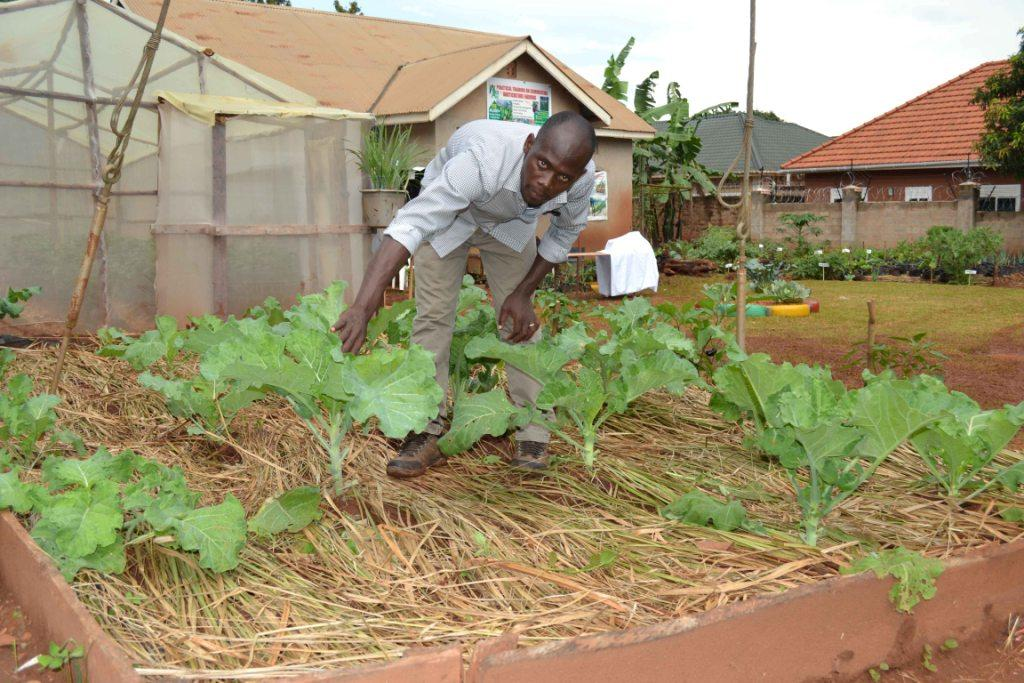
Picture showing how to take care of sukuma wiki while in the garden.

The plant is commercially cultivated for its thick, slightly bitter, edible leaves. For best texture, the leaves should be picked before they reach their maximum size, at which stage the leaves will be thicker and should be cooked differently from the new leaves. Age will not affect flavor. Flavor and texture also depend on the cultivar; the couve-manteiga and couve tronchuda are especially appreciated in Brazil and Portugal.

== Culinary use ==
Sukuma wiki has been eaten for at least 2,000 years, with evidence showing that the Ancient Greeks cultivated several forms of both colewort and kale.

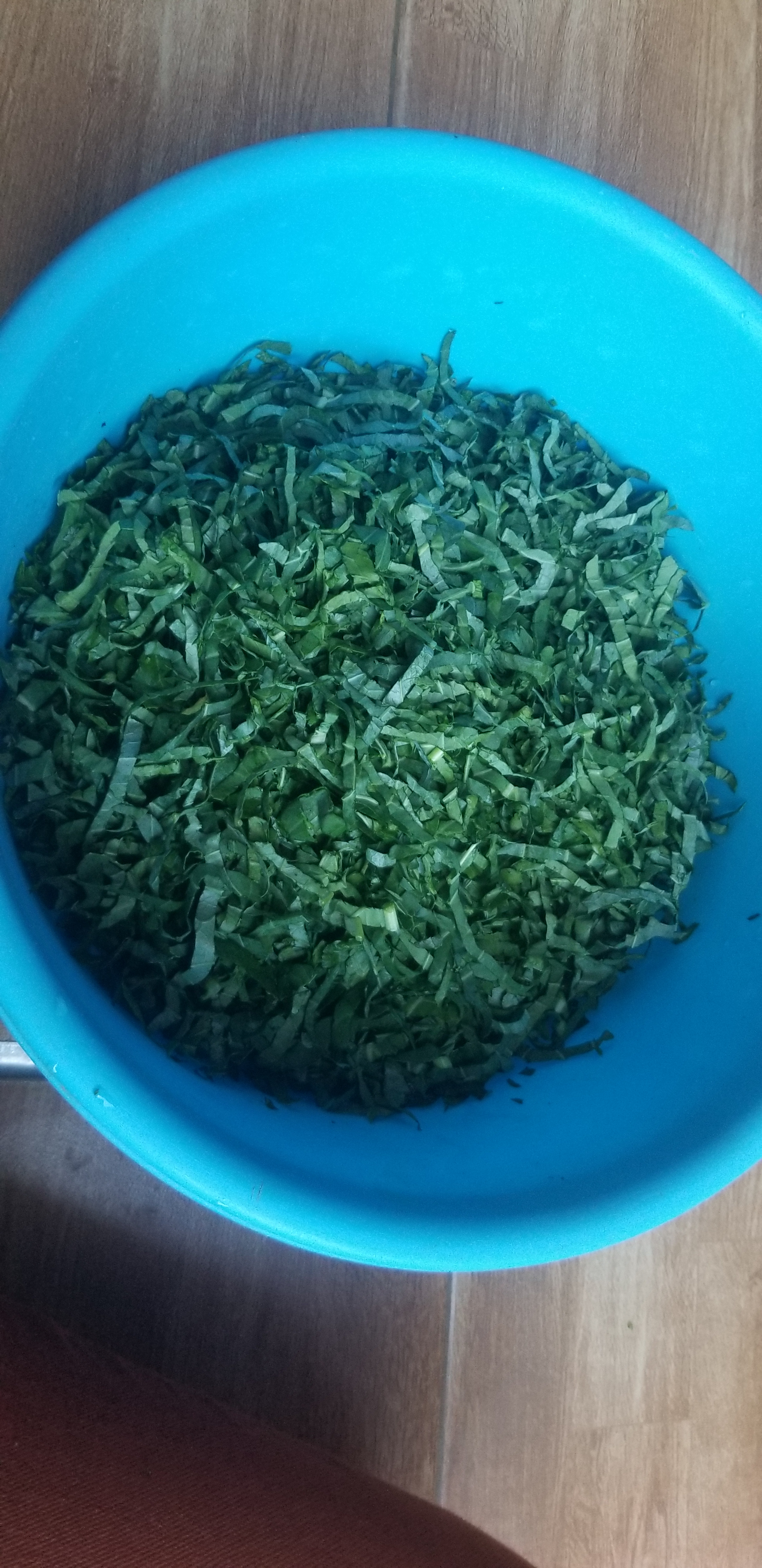
Thinly sliced sukuma wiki ready for cooking

In the Congo, Uganda, Tanzania, and Kenya (East Africa), thinly sliced colewort are the main accompaniments of a popular dish known as ugali (also sometimes called sima, sembe or posho), a corn flour cake.

Sukuma wiki is mainly lightly sauteed in oil until tender, flavored with onions and seasoned with salt, which can be served either as the main accompaniment or as a side dish with preferred meat (fish, chicken, beef, pork).

Fresh sukuma wiki leaves can be stored for up to 10 days if refrigerated to just above freezing (1 °C) at high humidity (>95%). In domestic refrigerators, fresh colewort can be stored for about three days. Once cooked, they can be frozen and stored for greater lengths of time.
