= Usipa =

Dried fish eaten in Malawi and Mozambique

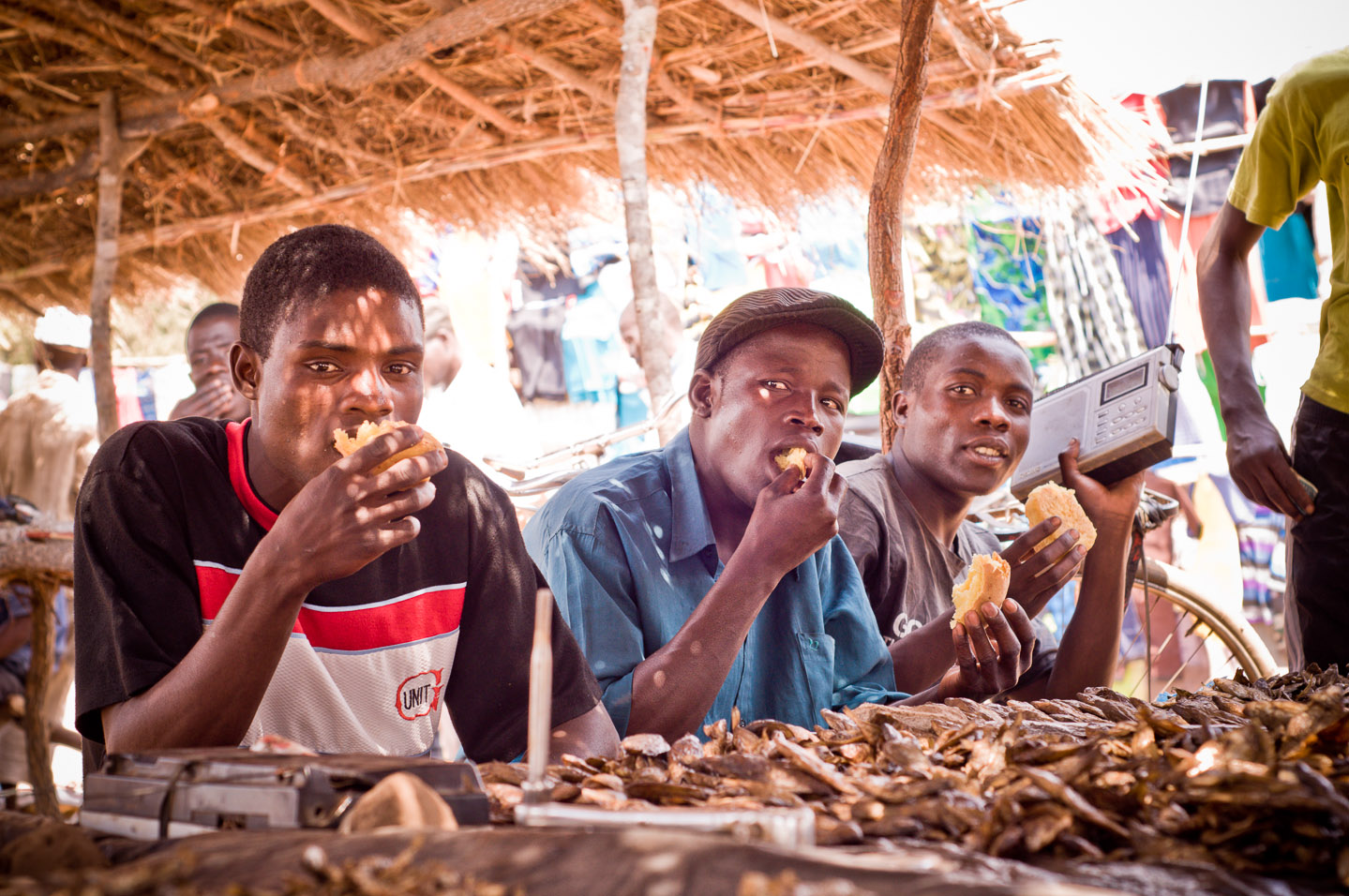
These Yawo men sit at a rural village market in Mozambique where usipa (dried fish) is being sold while they chow down on locally baked pao (bread)

Usipa (scientific name: Engraulicypris sardella) is a "small sardine-like fish that occurs in large shoals". Because of its small size, it is commonly dried. Usipa is mostly eaten in Malawi and Mozambique along with nsima ugali. Dried usipa is sold at most markets in Malawi. In Malawi, usipa is typically consumed with the bones in it due to their softness.

Usipa plays a significant role in the economic livelihood for many households at Lake Malawi that rely upon fishing for income. A great deal is not known about the species' biology.
