= Belonolaimus =

Scientific classification
- Domain: Eukaryota
- Kingdom: Animalia
- Phylum: Nematoda
- Class: Secernentea
- Order: Tylenchida
- Family: Belonolaimidae
- Subfamily: Belonolaiminae
- Genus: Belonolaimus; Steiner, 1949

Species
- 6, see text

Genus of roundworms

Belonolaimus is a genus of nematodes. They are known commonly as sting nematodes. They are ectoparasites that feed on plant roots, sometimes becoming agricultural pests. They are found in the United States, Mexico, and Puerto Rico.

The genus was erected with the description of B. gracilis from the roots of a pine tree in Florida in the United States. Other species were soon described from various pine species. B. longicaudatus was recognized as an important agricultural pest in the southeastern United States.

These are some of the largest plant-parasitic nematodes, reaching up to 3 millimeters in length. They feed by inserting their stylets into roots and sucking the contents of root cells. They can be found on fruits, vegetables, and turfgrasses or on crops such as cotton, soybeans, and tree plantations. Sting nematodes can cause severe plant damage and have been responsible for complete crop losses. B. longicaudis is considered to be the worst pest species.

Females are fertilized by males, storing sperm in a spermatheca. The females lay several eggs, and there are four juvenile stages.

== Species ==
There are six valid species, but B. longicaudis is considered a species complex.

- Belonolaimus euthychilus
- Belonolaimus gracilis
- Belonolaimus longicaudatus
- Belonolaimus maluceroi
- Belonolaimus maritimus
- Belonolaimus nortoni
