= Dolichodorus =

Scientific classification
- Domain: Eukaryota
- Kingdom: Animalia
- Phylum: Nematoda
- Class: Secernentea
- Order: Tylenchida
- Family: Dolichodoridae
- Genus: Dolichodorus; Cobb, (1914)

Species
- about 15

Genus of roundworms

Dolichodorus is a genus of nematodes known commonly as awl nematodes. They are distributed worldwide. They are ectoparasites of plant roots, and some are pests of agricultural crops.

== Description ==
These are among the largest plant-parasitic nematodes, reaching 1.5 to 3 millimetres (0.059 to 0.118 in) in length. They are slender and cylindrical in shape with annular rings along their bodies. They have long, strong stylets. There are male and female individuals in each species, and they reproduce sexually. The male has winglike folds surrounding its cloaca. Its sex organs include a pair of flanged spicules and a protruding gubernaculum to guide them during mating. The female has a rounded or hemispherical tail with a spike-shaped tip.

== Biology ==
Awl nematodes generally occur in moist and wet soils. In agricultural habitat they are common around irrigation ditches and ponds.

Adults and juveniles feed on plant roots. Damage is apparent when the root tips turn brownish yellow and develop lesions. The root tips die, the roots become coarse and curved, and the root system looks "stubby". A plant is stunted as its roots are destroyed.

The genus can be found on many host plant taxa. D. heterocephalus has been noted on a variety of crop plants, including sugarcane, beans, tomato, blueberry, and corn. D. kishansinghi is known from mango. D. mediterraneus is known from cork oak. D. silvestris is found on white pine. Several species occur on the coconut palm. They are found in the roots of grasses such as bromegrasses, bluegrasses, Manila grass, St. Augustine grass, bermudagrass, and centipedegrass.

== Diversity ==
There are approximately 15 species.

Species include:

- Dolichodorus aestuarius
- Dolichodorus aquaticus
- Dolichodorus cobbi
- Dolichodorus grandaspicatus
- Dolichodorus heterocephalus
- Dolichodorus kishansinghi
- Dolichodorus longicaudatus
- Dolichodorus marylandicus
- Dolichodorus minor
- Dolichodorus miradvulvus
- Dolichodorus nigeriens
- Dolichodorus pellegrini
- Dolichodorus profundus
- Dolichodorus pulvinus
- Dolichodorus silvestris
- Dolichodorus similis
