= Mielie meal =

Coarse maize flour, mainly used in Africa

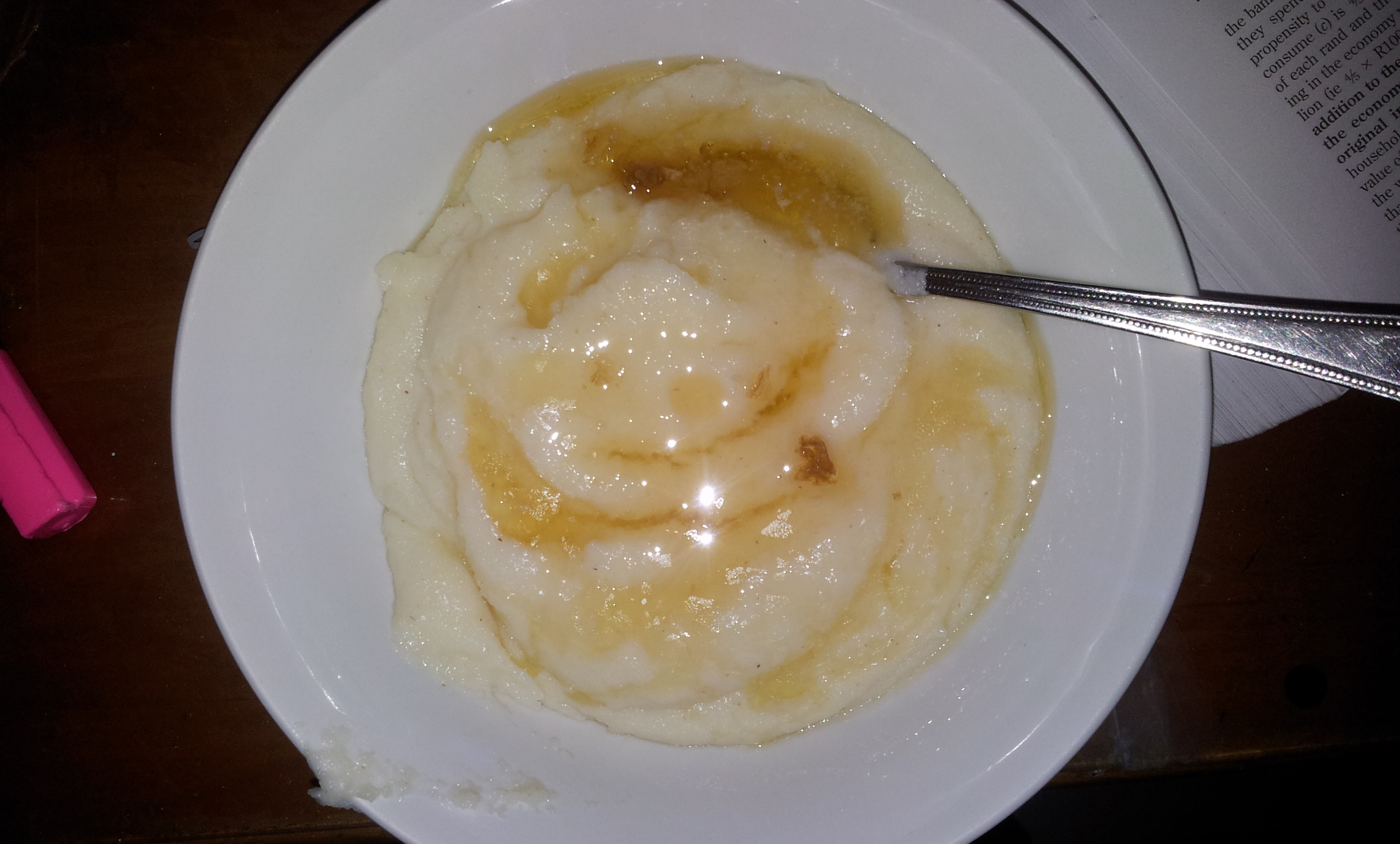
- Mielie meal paste served with syrup as a breakfast dish
- Alternative names: Maize meal/Bota
- Type: Flour; staple food
- Course: Any, often breakfast
- Place of origin: Southern Africa
- Main ingredients: Maize
- Similar dishes: Cornmeal

Mielie meal, also known as mealie meal or maize meal, is a relatively coarse flour or cornmeal (much coarser than cornflour or cornstarch) made from maize (also called mealies) in Southern Africa. It was originally brought to Africa from the Americas by the Portuguese. Its etymology is uncertain, and may be from the Portuguese milho, or the Afrikaans mielie, from obsolete Dutch milie ("millet, maize"). It is also known by various other indigenous language names depending on the locality or country.

It is a food that was originally eaten by the Voortrekkers during The Great Trek, but has become the staple diet of most Southern African countries. Because of its ability to be stored without refrigeration, it is cheap and abundant in all shops and markets. It is a staple food in South Africa, Namibia, Mozambique, Lesotho, Eswatini, Zambia, Zimbabwe, Malawi, Botswana and many other parts of Southern Africa, traditionally made into uphuthu, unga (nshima), sour-milk porridge, pap, munkoyo, and also umqombothi and chibwantu (types of beer).

== Pap and phutu ==
The raw ingredient of mielie meal is added to boiling water, the ratio of which produces either porridge or the firmer pap/nshima/sadza/boswa. When making porridge, milk is sometimes used to produce a creamier dish. The porridge usually has a thick texture and is commonly eaten for breakfast in southern Africa. The firmer pap is eaten with meat and gravy dishes as well as vegetable relishes. It is similar to Italian polenta except that, like grits in the Southern United States, it is usually made of a white rather than a yellow maize variety.

== Nutrition ==
Mealie meal contains carbohydrates, protein, fat and fiber.

== See also ==
- Cornmeal
- Fufu
- Grits
- Polenta
- Sadza
- Samp
- Ugali
- List of maize dishes
