= Chikanda =

Zambian Dish

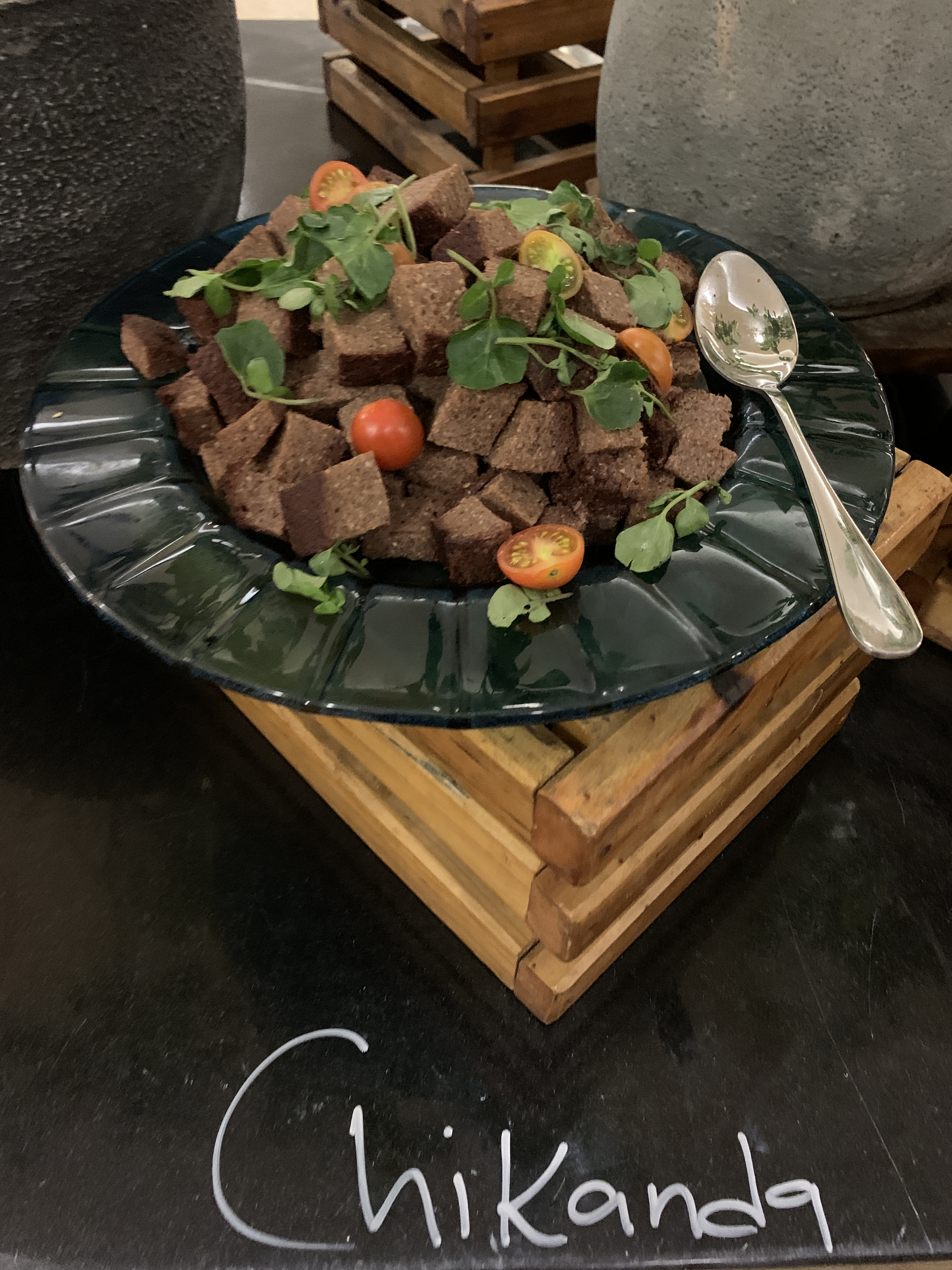
- Chikanda
- Alternative names: Kinaka, Chinaka, Kikanda, African Polony, Zambian Polony, Zambian Sausage
- Type: Snack, Dessert, Side dish
- Place of origin: Zambia
- Region or state: Southern Africa, East Africa
- Main ingredients: Orchid tubers, Groundnut meal, Baking soda or ash water, Spices

Chikanda is a Zambian dish made from the boiled root tubers of terrestrial orchids also called chikanda. The dish is often called "African polony" because it has a texture that resembles bologna. Chikanda can be eaten as a snack, dessert, or an accompaniment to nshima, a maize flour porridge.

== Background ==
Chikanda has been eaten for hundreds of years by people in parts of Zambia, northern Malawi, and southwestern Tanzania. The dish is traditionally associated with the Bemba tribe in northeast Zambia, although it is eaten throughout Zambia today. For the Bemba, it is an integral part of the culture and is served at special occasions such as weddings. Originally a food in the setting of rural scarcity, it has now shifted to an urban trend. Now, chikanda can be found being sold by street vendors, supermarkets, and large restaurants as the urban population has an increased demand for this rural tradition.

In Malawi, it is thought that eating the dish will protect against sickness.

In southwestern Tanzania, a similar dish called kinaka in Kiswahili are eaten by the Nyamwanga, Nyika, Nyiha, Fipa, Lungu, and Ndali.

== Ingredients ==
There are many different species of orchids used, but primarily from the Disa, Habenaria, and Satyrium genera. Researchers determined that 16 orchid species in 6 genera are in the chikanda trade. The orchid roots resemble the shape of an Irish potato but are smaller in size. The ash water or baking soda with their high pH likely provides supplemental minerals and leads to the soapy taste and firm texture of chikanda.

== Preparation ==
The tubers are dried and pounded. Then, a mixture of the dried brown orchid meal and groundnut meal are boiled to form a slurry. Dried chili peppers can also be added. The slurry is thickened by soda, salted, and flavored with spices. As it simmers, the slurry thickens into a cake and rises like dough. It is usually served sliced.

== Sustainability issues ==
The orchid roots grow wild throughout Zambia. However, due to the high demand, this had led to the present scarcity of the orchids in the country. Now, they are illegally imported from Tanzania, Angola, and the Democratic Republic of Congo, leading to the risk of overharvesting abroad. Traditional sustainability practices included only harvested tubers that have spread their seed and replanting stalks. However, the locals have abandoned these practices due to increased demand. The orchids are difficult to cultivate in captivity. Current efforts for conservation focus on cultivating the threatened orchids.
