= Belonolaimus gracilis =

Scientific classification
- Domain: Eukaryota
- Kingdom: Animalia
- Phylum: Nematoda
- Class: Secernentea
- Order: Tylenchida
- Family: Belonolaimidae
- Genus: Belonolaimus
- Species: B. gracilis

Binomial name
- Belonolaimus gracilis Steiner, 1949

Species of roundworm

Belonolaimus gracilis (pine sting nematode) is a plant pathogenic nematode.
