= Karatu, Karatu District =

Ward and district capital of the Karatu District in the Arusha Region of Tanzania

Karatu Kata ya Karatu (Swahili)
- Ward and Capital of Karatu District
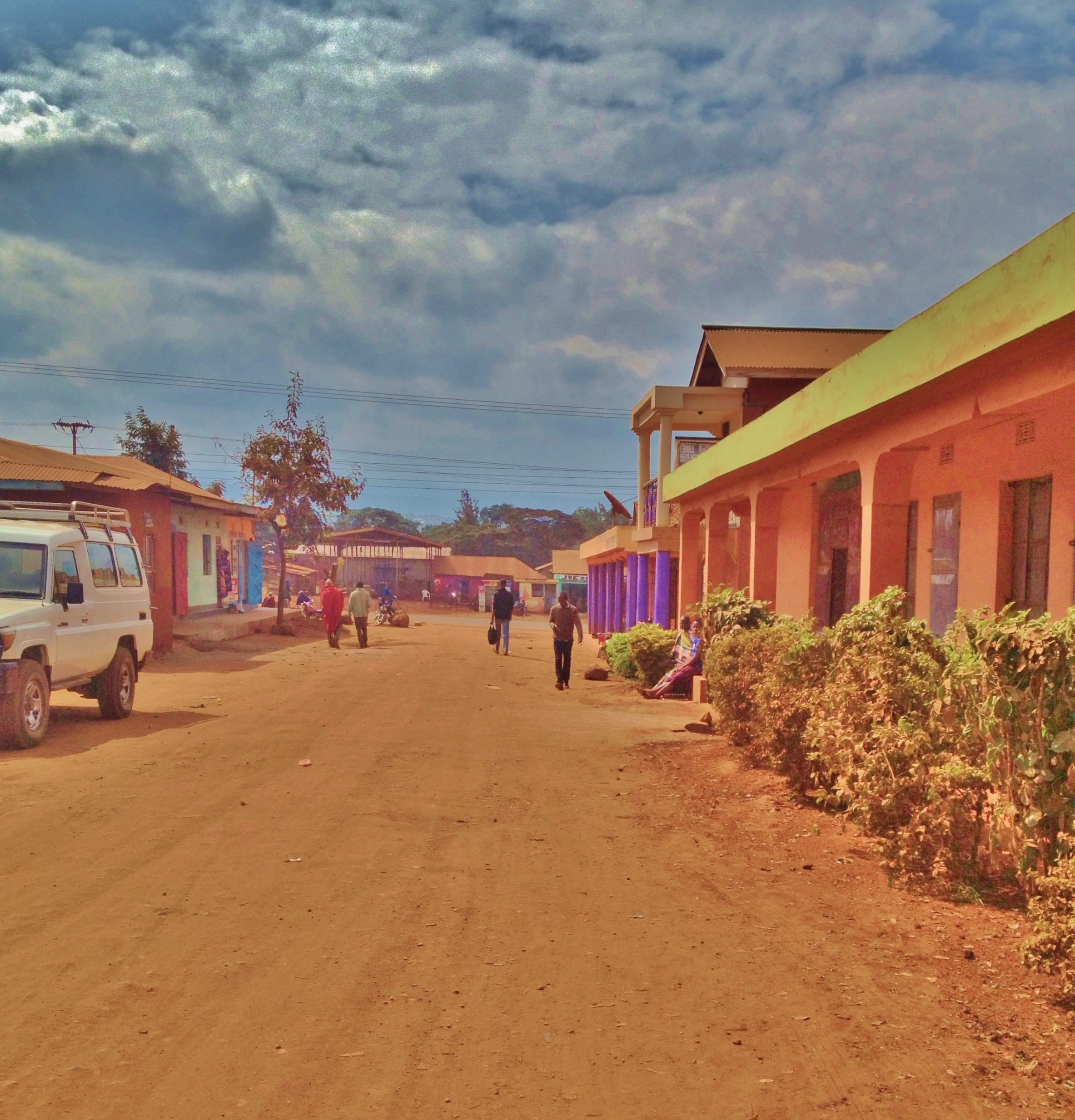
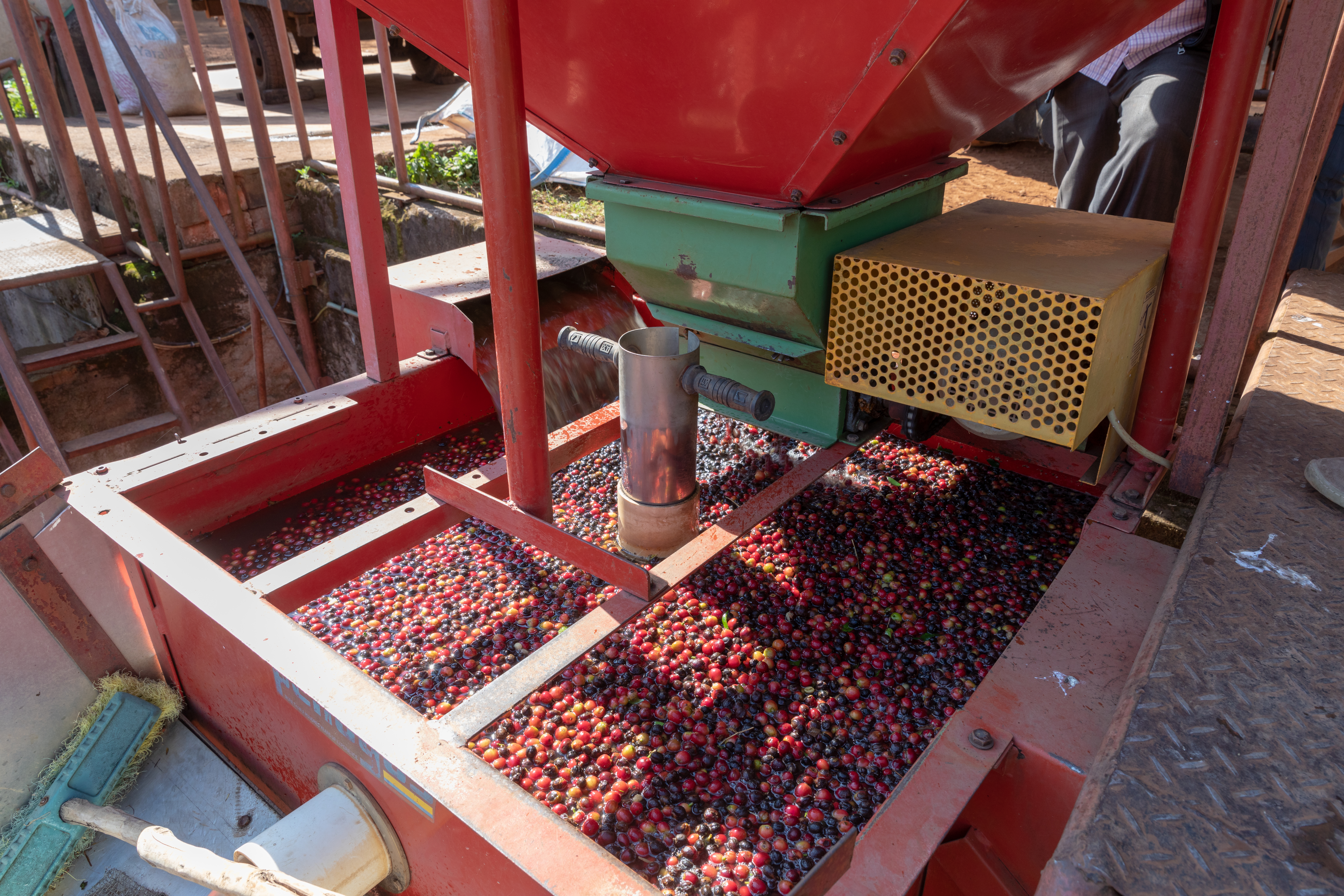
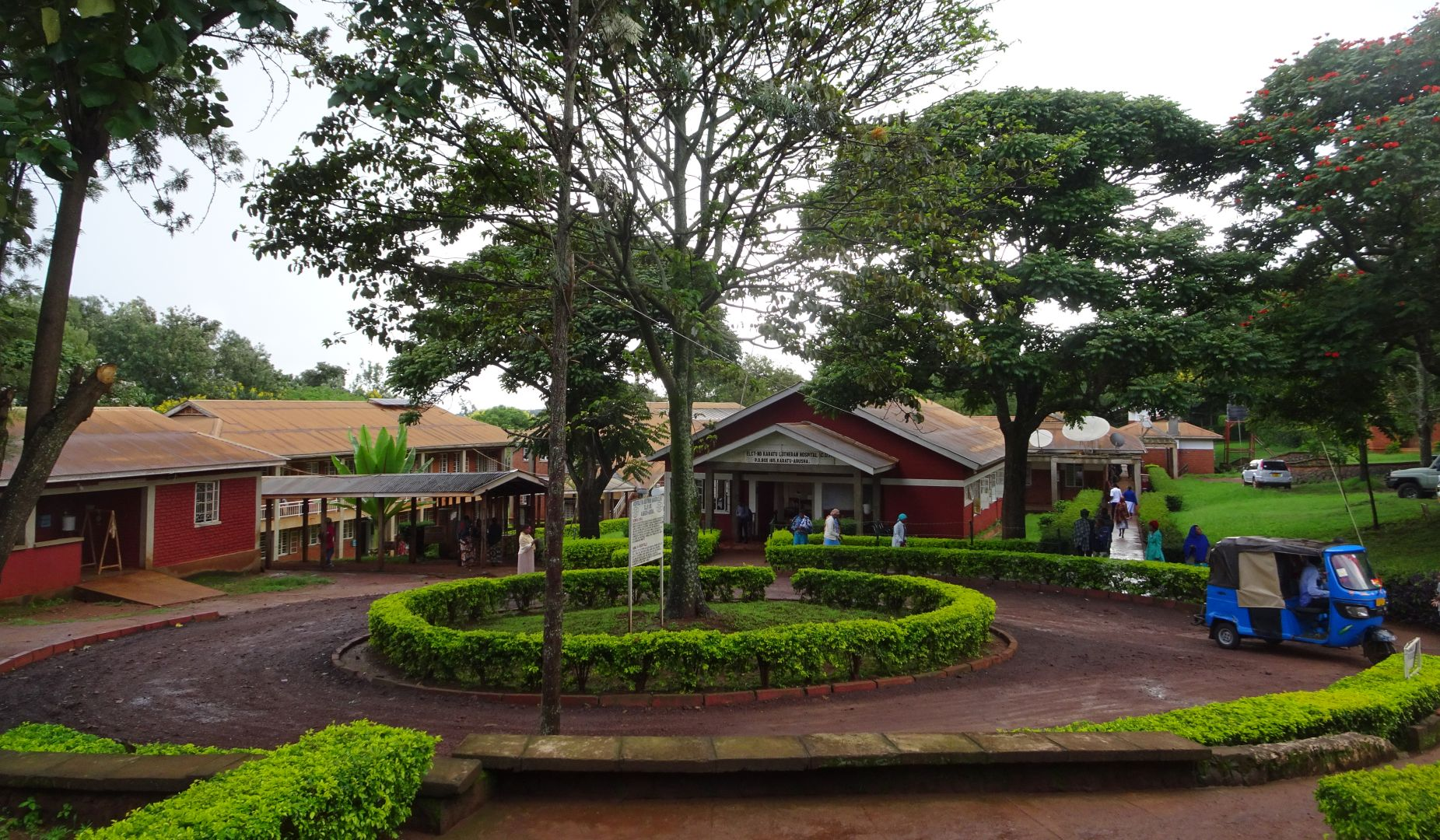
- From top to bottom: Karatu scene, Coffee processing in Karatu & Lutheran Hospital Karatu
- Nickname: The safari junction
- Location within Tanzania
- Coordinates: 3°20′43.44″S 35°40′10.92″E
- Country: Tanzania
- Region: Arusha Region
- District: Karatu District

Area
  - Total: 2.643 km^{2} (1.020 sq mi)
- Elevation: 1,420 m (4,660 ft)

Population (2012)
  - Total: 26,617
- Demonym: Karatuan

Ethnic groups
  - Settler: Swahili
  - Ancestral: Hadza, Datooga & Iraqw
- Tanzanian Postal Code: 23601

Karatu or Karatu Town (Kata na Mji wa Karatu in Swahili) is an administrative ward and district capital located in the Karatu District of the Arusha Region of Tanzania. The ward town is bordered on its north side by Ganako ward, to the east by Rhotia ward, to the south by Endamarariek ward, and to the west by Qurus ward. According to the 2012 census, the ward has a total population of 26,617. Karatu ward is the most populous ward in Karatu district and is the capital of Karatu District.

== Economy ==
Karatu is a small town in the Arusha District, excellently positioned on the borders of Lake Manyara National Park and Ngorongoro Crater, giving it the nickname 'Safari Junction'. It is frequently utilized as a quick stopover in between safari expeditions or as a less expensive lodging alternative than staying on the rim of the Crater and within Lake Manyara National Park.

The Karatu Market takes place on the 7th and 25th of each month. local sellers will gather in Karatu for a large market, displaying homemade objects and selling goods and souvenirs. There is also a smaller, daily market in the center of the town.

== Demographics ==
The Iraqw, a primarily Christian people, are the dominant tribe of Karatu. Their language is linguistically distinct because it originated in Ethiopia. They are farmers who gain from selling cultural artifacts such as pottery to tourists going to and from the Ngorongoro Conservation Area.

== Administration ==
The postal code for Karatu Ward is 23601. The ward is divided into the following neighborhoodss:

- Barazani
- Bomani
- Bwawani
- Kati
- Maliasili
- Mangafi
- Manyara
- mazingira Bira
- NMC
- Slahhamo
- TFA

=== Government ===
The ward, like every other ward in the country, has local government offices based on the population served. The Karatu Ward administration building houses a court as per the Ward Tribunal Act of 1988, including other vital departments for the administration the ward. The ward has the following administration offices:

- Karatu Ward Police Station located in Kati neighbirhood
- Karatu Ward Government Office (Afisa Mtendaji, Kata ya Karatu) in Kati Neighborhood
- Karatu Ward Tribunal (Baraza La Kata) is a Department inside Ward Government Office

In the local government system of Tanzania, the ward is the smallest democratic unit. Each ward is composed of a committee of eight elected council members which include a chairperson, one salaried officer (with no voting rights), and an executive officer. One-third of seats are reserved for women councillors.

== Education and health ==
=== Education ===
The home to these educational institutions:

- Karatu Secondary School
- Karatu Teachers College
- Karatu Primary School
- Bwawani Primary School
- Karatu Boys High School

=== Healthcare ===
The ward is home to the following health institutions:

- Karatu Health Center
