= Hadza people =

Ethnic group from Arusha Region of Tanzania

Hadza
hadzabe
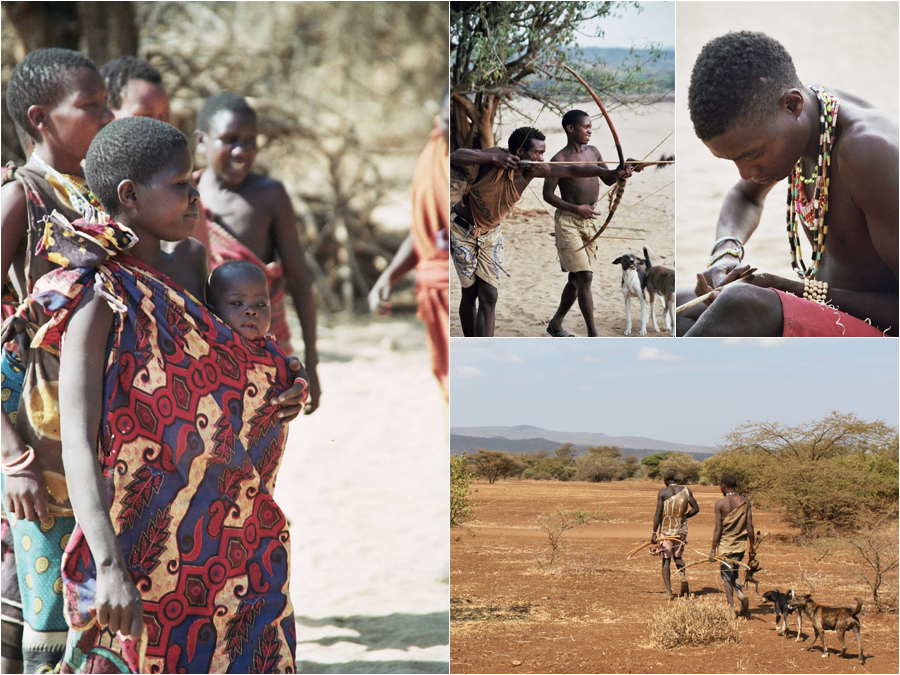
- Hadza in Karatu District, Arusha Region

Total population
- 1,200–1,300

Regions with significant populations
- Tanzania Karatu District, Arusha Region Rift Valley

Languages
- English, Hadza, Isanzu, Sukuma, & Swahili

Religion
- None

Related ethnic groups
- None

The Hadza, or Hadzabe (Swahili: Wahadzabe [wahad͜zabe]), is one of the last true nomadic hunter-gatherer societies on earth, a protected hunter-gatherer Tanzanian indigenous ethnic group, primarily based in Baray, an administrative ward within Karatu District in southwest Arusha Region. They live around the Lake Eyasi basin in the central Rift Valley and in the neighboring Serengeti Plateau. As descendants of Tanzania's aboriginal, pre-Bantu expansion hunter-gatherer population, they have probably occupied their current territory for thousands of years with relatively little modification to their basic way of life until the last century. They have no known close genetic relatives and their language is considered an isolate despite containing Swahili loanwords.

When the Hadza first came into contact with European settlers in the late 19th century, governments and missionaries made many attempts to settle them by integrating farming and Christianity. These efforts have largely failed, and many Hadza still pursue a life similar to that of their ancestors. In the 18th century, the Hadza also came into contact with pastoralist peoples entering Hadzaland, sometimes declining in population. Non-Hadza visitors and safari hunting have also affected them in recent years.

Hadza people traditionally live in bands or 'camps' of around 20-30 people, and their social structures are egalitarian and non-hierarchical. Traditionally, they primarily forage for food, eating mostly honey, tubers, fruit, and, especially in the dry season, meat. In 2015, there were between 1,200 and 1,300 Hadza people living in Tanzania. Only around a third of the remaining Hadza still survive exclusively by traditional foraging.

The term "Hadza" is the feminine plural form of haza 'human being'. The Hadza call themselves the hazabee 'people' and their language hazane 'as the people'. Other spellings in English are Hadzapi (from hazaphii [ɦad͜zapʰiʔi̥] 'they (male) are people') and Hatsa; other ethnonyms applied to the Hadza include Tindiga (from Swahili; human plural Watindiga), Kindiga, Kangeju (with a German j) and Wahi (with a German w). In current English usage, Hadza is the most commonly used term.

== Language ==
Once classified among the Khoisan languages primarily because it has clicks, the Hadza language (Hadzane) is now thought to be an isolated language, unrelated to any other language. Hadzane is an entirely oral language. UNESCO states that the language is vulnerable because most children learn it, but the use is restricted to certain areas of life, such as in their homes. Still, it is not predicted to be in danger of extinction. Hadzane fluency is also considered the most important factor in distinguishing whether someone is Hadza. In more recent years, many of the Hadza have learned Swahili, the national language of Tanzania, as a second language.

== History ==
=== Oral tradition ===
One telling of Hadza's oral history divides their past into four epochs, each inhabited by a different culture. According to this tradition, at the beginning of time, the world was inhabited by hairy giants called the akakaanebee (first ones) or geranebee (ancient ones). The akakaanebee did not possess tools or fire; they hunted game by running it down until it fell dead; they ate meat raw. They did not build houses but slept under trees, as the Hadza do today in the dry season. In older versions of this story, they did not use fire because it was physically impossible in the earth's primeval state. Younger Hadza, who have been to school, say that the akakaanebee did not know how to use fire.

In the second epoch, the akakaanebee were succeeded by the xhaaxhaanebee (in-between ones), who were equally gigantic but without hair. Fire could be made and used to cook meat, but animals had grown more wary of humans and had to be chased and hunted by dogs. The xhaaxhaanebee were the first people to use medicines and charms to protect themselves from enemies and initiated the epeme rite. They lived in caves.

The third epoch was inhabited by the people of hamakwanebee (recent days), who were smaller than their predecessors. They invented bows and arrows, cooked with containers, and mastered the use of fire. They also built huts like those of Hadza today. The people of hamakwanebee were the first of the Hadza ancestors to have contact with non-foraging people, with whom they traded for iron to make knives and arrowheads. They also invented the gambling game lukuchuko.

The fourth epoch continues today and is inhabited by the hamayishonebee (those of today). When discussing the hamayishonebee epoch, people often mention specific names and places and can say approximately how many generations ago events occurred.

=== Archaeology and genetic history ===
The Hadza are not closely related to any other people. The Hadza language was once classified with the Khoisan languages because it has click consonants; however, there is no further evidence they are related. Genetically, the Hadza do not appear to be closely related to Khoisan speakers; even the Sandawe, who live around 150 kilometres (93 mi) away, diverged from the Hadza more than 15,000 years ago. Genetic testing also suggests significant admixture has occurred between the Hadza and Bantu. Minor admixture with Nilotic and Cushitic-speaking populations may have occurred in the last few thousand years. Today, a few Hadza women marry into neighbouring groups such as the Bantu Isanzu and the Nilotic Datooga, but these marriages often fail, and the women and their children return to the Hadza. In previous decades, rape and capture of Hadza women by outsiders seems to have been common. During a famine in 1918–20, some Hadza men were reported as taking Isanzu wives.

The Hadza's ancestors have probably lived in their current territory for tens of thousands of years. Hadzaland is about 50 kilometres (31 mi) from Olduvai Gorge, an area sometimes called the "Cradle of Mankind" because of the number of hominin fossils found there, and 40 kilometres (25 mi) from the prehistoric site of Laetoli. Archaeological evidence suggests that the area has been continuously occupied by hunter-gatherers much like the Hadza since at least the beginning of the Later Stone Age, 50,000 years ago. Although the Hadza do not make rock art today, they consider several rock art sites within their territory, probably at least 2,000 years old, to have been created by their ancestors, and their oral history does not suggest they moved to Hadzaland from elsewhere.

The Hadza population is dominated by haplogroup B2-M112 (Y-DNA). There are also Y-haplogroups haplogroup E-V38(Y-DNA) and haplogroup E-M215(Y-DNA).

=== Precolonial period ===
Until about 500 BCE, Tanzania was exclusively occupied by hunter-gatherers akin to the Hadza. The first agriculturalists to enter the region were Cushitic-speaking cattle herders from the Horn of Africa. Around 500 CE, the Bantu expansion reached Tanzania, bringing populations of farmers with iron tools and weapons. The last major ethnic group to enter the region were Nilotic pastoralists who migrated south from Sudan in the 18th century.

Each of these expansions of farming and herding peoples displaced earlier populations of hunter-gatherers, who were at a demographic and technological disadvantage and vulnerable to the loss of environmental resources (i.e., foraging areas and habitats for game) to farmland and pastures. Groups such as the Hadza and the Sandawe are remnants of indigenous hunter-gatherer populations that were once much more widespread, and they are under continued pressure from the expansion of agriculture into their traditional lands.

Farmers and herders appeared in the vicinity of Hadzaland relatively recently. The Isanzu, a Bantu farming people, began living south of Hadzaland around 1850. The pastoralist Iraqw and Datooga were both forced to migrate into the area by the expansion of the Maasai, the former in the 19th century and the latter in the 1910s. The Hadza also have direct contact with the Maasai and with the Sukuma west of Lake Eyasi. The upheavals caused by the Maasai expansion in the late 19th century caused a decline in the Hadza population.

The Hadza's interaction with many of these peoples has been hostile. Pastoralists often killed Hadza as reprisals for the "theft" of livestock since the Hadza did not have the notion of animal ownership and would hunt them as they would wild game. The general attitude of neighboring agro-pastoralists towards the Hadza was prejudicial. They viewed them as backward, lacking a "real language," and made up of the dispossessed of neighboring tribes that had fled into the forest out of poverty or because they committed a crime. Many of these misconceptions were transmitted to early colonial visitors to the region who wrote about the Hadza.

The Isanzu were hostile to the Hadza at times. Isanzu people may have captured them as part of the slave trade until as late as the 1870s when it was halted by the German colonial government. Later interactions were more peaceful, with the two peoples sometimes intermarrying and residing together, though as late as 1912, the Hadza were reported as being "ready for war" with the Isanzu. Still, folk tales depict the Isanzu as favorable and, at times, heroic, unlike the Iraqw and the cattle-raiding Maasai. Moreover, many goods and customs come from them, and the Hadza myths mention and depict a benevolent influence of the Isanzu in their mythology.

The Sukuma and the Hadza had a more amicable relationship. The Sukuma drove their herds and salt caravans through Hadza lands and exchanged old metal tools, which the Hadza made into arrowheads, for the right to hunt elephants in Hadzaland.

=== 20th century ===
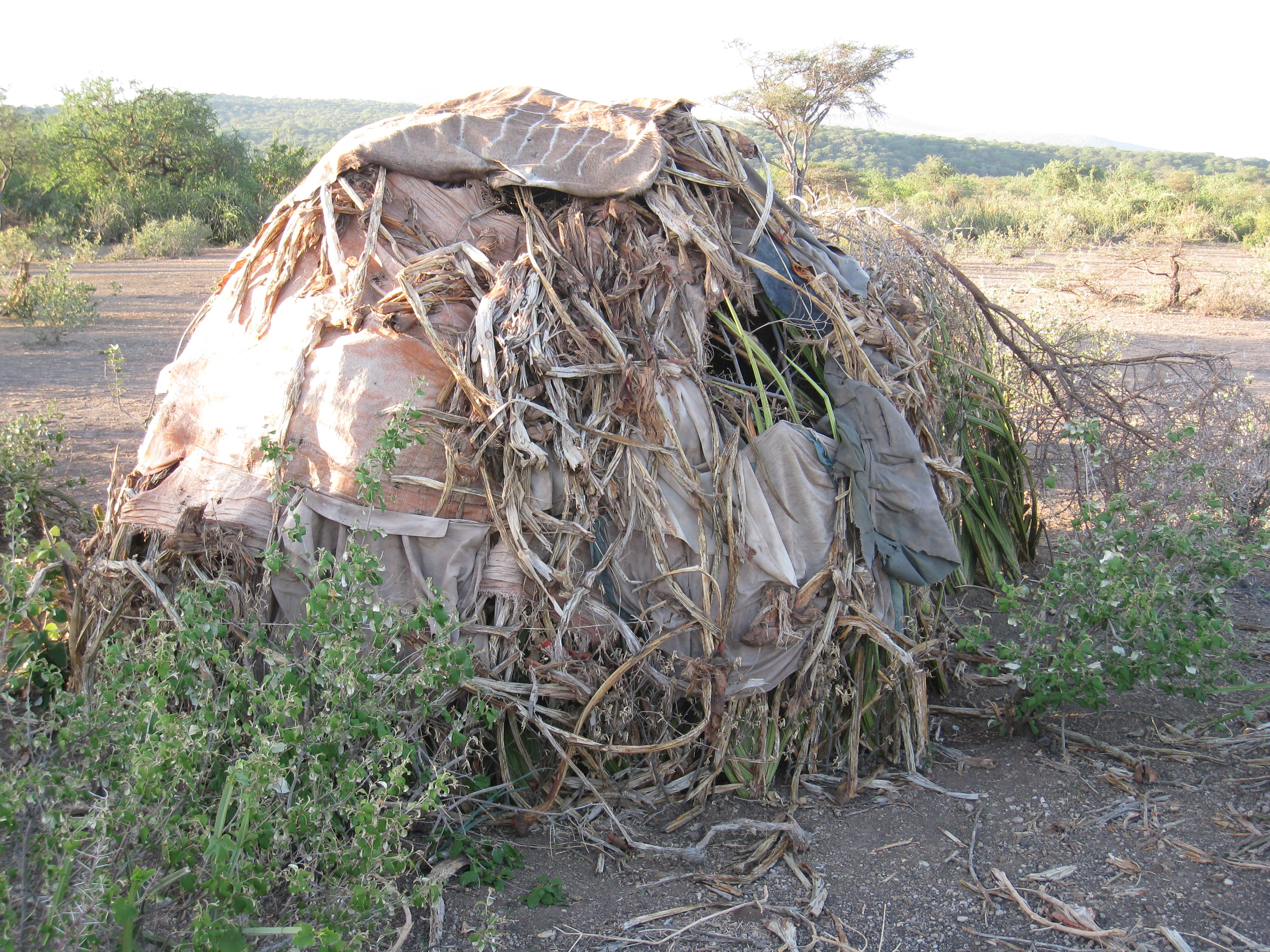
A Hadza hut. Huts have been built in this style for as long as records have been kept.

In the late 19th century, European powers claimed much of the African continent as colonies in a period known as the Scramble for Africa. The Hadza became part of German East Africa, though there is no evidence that Europeans had ever visited Hadzaland before the colony was proclaimed. The earliest mention of the Hadza in a written account is in German explorer Oscar Baumann's Durch Massailand zur Nilquelle (1894). The Hadza hid from Baumann and other early explorers, and their descriptions are based on second-hand accounts.

The first Europeans to report meeting the Hadza are Otto Dempwolff and Erich Obst. The latter lived with them for eight weeks in 1911. German Tanganyika came under British control at the end of the First World War (1917), and soon after, British colonial officer F. J. Bagshawe wrote about the Hadza. The accounts of these early European visitors portray the Hadza at the beginning of the 20th century as living in the same way as they do today. Early on, Obst noted a distinction between what he considered the 'pure' Hadza (those subsisting purely by hunting and gathering) and those that lived with the Isanzu and practiced some cultivation.

The foraging Hadza foraged and hunted using many of the same techniques they do today. Game was more plentiful in the early 20th century because farmers had not yet begun directly encroaching on their lands. Some early reports describe the Hadza as having chiefs or big men, but those reports were probably mistaken; more reliable accounts portray the early 20th century Hadza as egalitarian, as they are today. They also lived in similarly sized camps, used the same tools, built houses in the same style, and had similar religious beliefs.

The British colonial government tried to make the Hadza settle down and adopt farming in 1927, the first of many such government efforts. The British tried again in 1939, the independent Tanzanian government tried in 1965 and 1990, and various foreign missionary groups have tried the same since the 1960s. These numerous attempts, some forceful, have largely failed. Generally, the Hadza willingly settle as long as provided food stocks last, then leave and resume their traditional hunter-gatherer lives when the provisions run out; few have adopted farming for sustenance. Disease is also a problem – because their communities are sparse and isolated, few Hadza are immune to common infectious diseases such as measles, which thrive in sedentary communities, and several settlement attempts ended with outbreaks of illness resulting in many deaths, particularly of children.

Of the four villages built for the Hadza since 1965, two (Yaeda Chini and Munguli) are now inhabited by the Isanzu, Iraqw, and Datooga. Another, Mongo wa Mono, established in 1988, is sporadically occupied by Hadza groups who stay there for a few months at a time, either farming, foraging, or using the food given to them by missionaries. At the fourth village, Endamagha (also known as Mwonyembe), some Hadza children attend school, but they account for just a third of the students there. Numerous attempts to convert the Hadza to Christianity have also been largely unsuccessful.

Tanzanian farmers began moving into the Mangola area to grow onions in the 1940s, but they came in small numbers until the 1960s. The first German plantation in Hadzaland was established in 1928, and later, three European families settled in the area. Since the 1960s, the Hadza have been visited regularly by anthropologists, linguists, geneticists, and other researchers.

=== Present ===
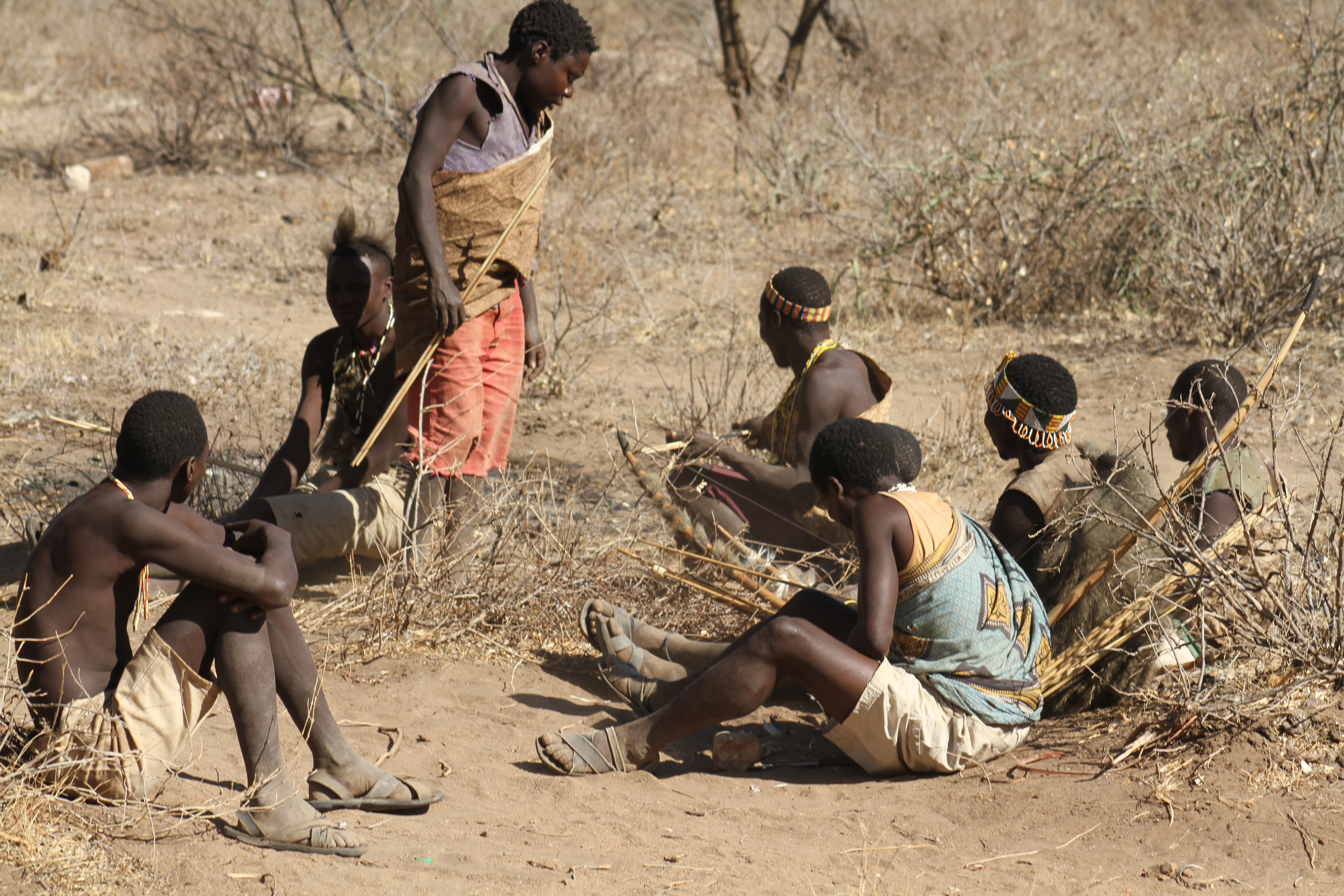
Hadza hunters

In recent years, Hadza territory has seen increasing encroachment from neighboring peoples. The western Hadza lands are now a private hunting reserve, and the Hadza are officially restricted to a reservation within the reserve and prohibited from hunting there. The Yaeda Valley, long uninhabited due to the tsetse fly, is now settled by Datooga herders, who are clearing the Hadza lands on either side of the valley for pasture for their goats and cattle. The Datooga hunt out the game, and their land clearing destroys the berries, tubers, and honey that the Hadza rely on. Watering holes for Datooga cattle can cause the shallow watering holes that the Hadza rely on to dry up. Most Hadzabe are no longer able to sustain themselves in the bush without supplementary food such as ugali.

After appearing in documentaries on the Hadza on PBS and the BBC in 2001, the Mang'ola Hadza have become a tourist attraction. Although this may seem to help the Hadzabe, much of the money from tourism is allocated to government offices and tourism companies instead of the Hadzabe. Money given directly to Hadzabe also contributes to alcoholism, and deaths from alcohol poisoning have recently become a severe problem, further contributing to the loss of cultural knowledge.

In 2007, the local government controlling the Hadza lands adjacent to the Yaeda Valley leased the entire 6,500 square kilometres (2,500 sq mi) of land to the Al Nahyan royal family of the United Arab Emirates for use as a "personal safari playground". Both the Hadza and Datooga were evicted, with some Hadza resisters imprisoned. However, after protests from the Hadza and negative coverage in the international press, the deal was rescinded.

The Hadzabe were part of major studies concerning evolutionary anthropology and bioenergetics. Research on bioenergetics was primarily conducted by Duke University professor Herman Pontzer and Pontzer's research team. Pontzer's fieldwork was also overseen by the Tanzanian National Institute for Medical Research and Commission for Science and Technology. The Hadzabe were instrumental in the researchers' discovery of the exercise paradox, which found that the Hadzabe had comparable caloric expenditure to sedentary individuals in industrialized nations, despite being more physically active.

== Range ==
Range of the Hadza people (dark grey) in Tanzania

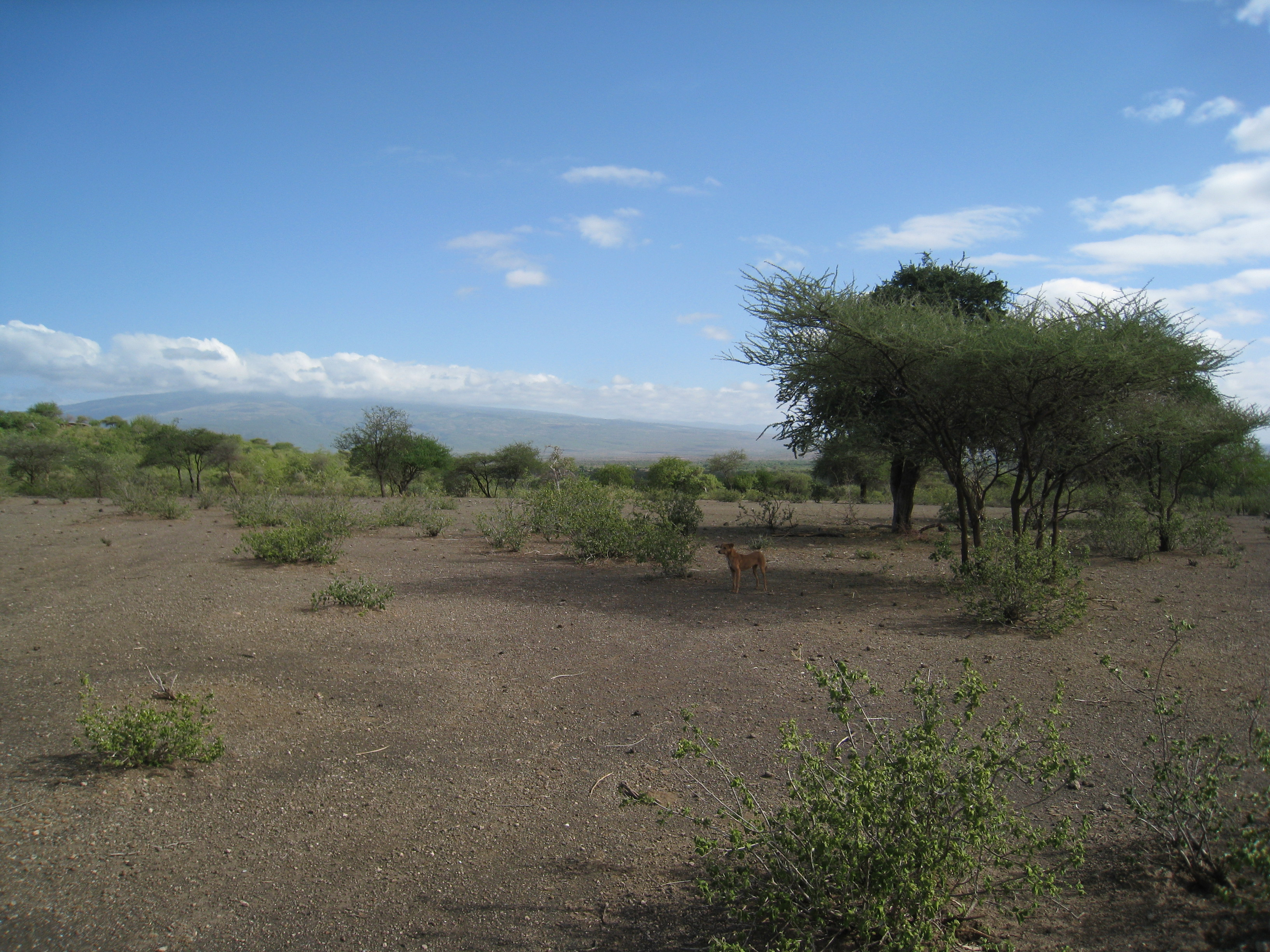
Serengeti hunting grounds in Hadzaland

There are four traditional areas of Hadza dry-season habitation: West of the southern end of Lake Eyasi (Dunduhina), between Lake Eyasi and the Yaeda Valley swamp to the east (Tlhiika), east of the Yaeda Valley in the Mbulu Highlands (Siponga), and north of the valley around the town of Mang'ola (Mangola). During the wet season, the Hadza camp outside and between these areas. During the dry season, they readily travel between them. People access the western area by crossing the southern end of the lake, which is the first part to dry up, or by following the escarpment of the Serengeti Plateau around the northern shore. The Yaeda Valley is easily crossed, and the areas to either side abut the hills south of Mang'ola.

The Hadza have traditionally foraged outside of these areas, in the Yaeda Valley, on the slopes of Mount Oldeani north of Mang'ola, and up onto the Serengeti Plains. Such foraging is done for hunting, berry collecting, and for honey. Although hunting is illegal in the Serengeti, the Tanzanian authorities recognize that the Hadza are a special case and do not enforce the regulations on them, just as the Hadza are the only people in Tanzania not taxed by the local or national government.

== Social structure ==
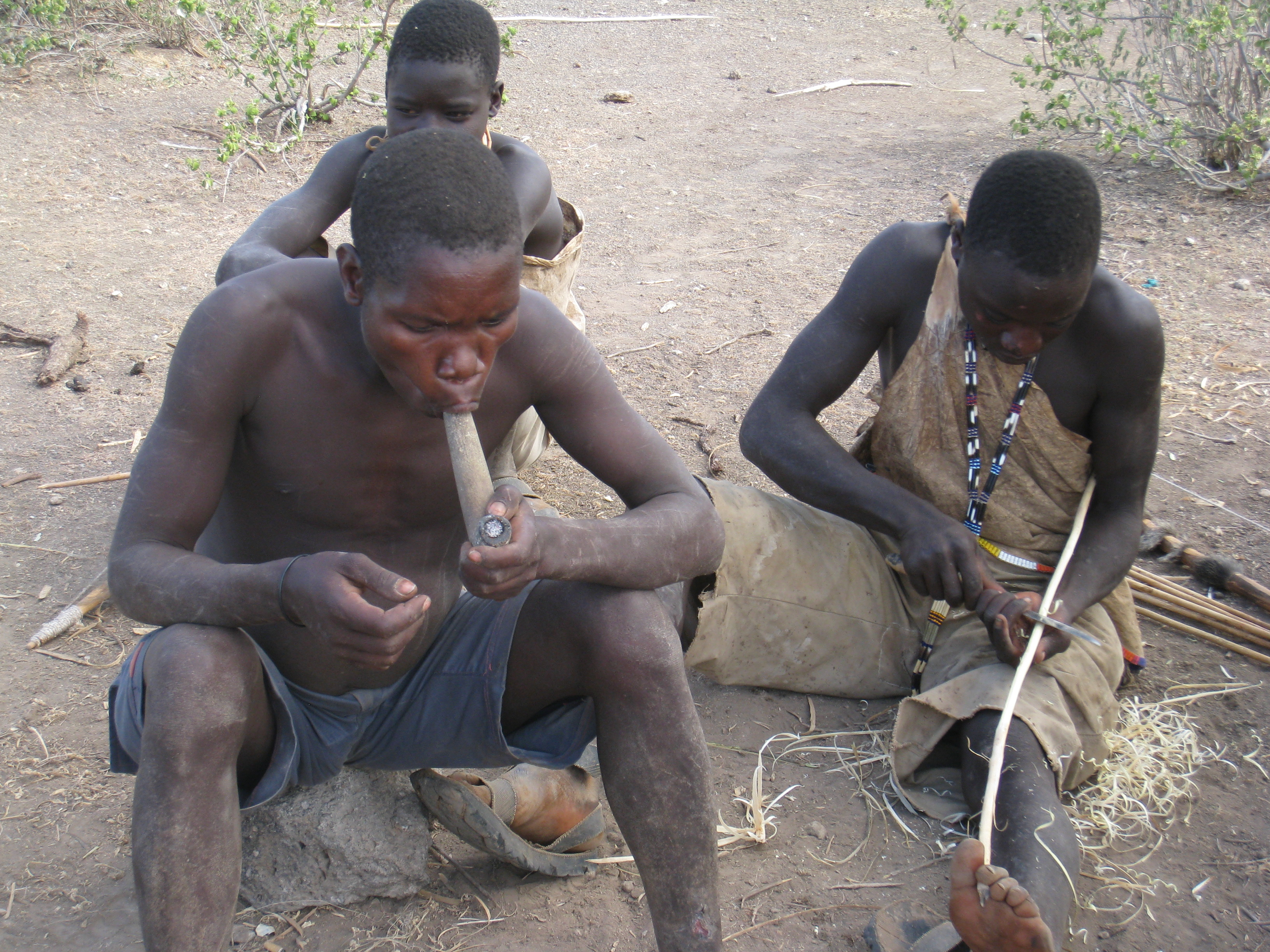
Hadza smoking cannabis

The Hadza are organized into bands or 'camps' of 20–30 people. Camps of over a hundred may form during berry season. There is no tribal or other governing hierarchy, and almost all decisions are made by reaching an agreement through discussion. The Hadza trace descent bilaterally (through both paternal and maternal lines), and almost all Hadza people can trace some kin tie to all other Hadza people. Furthermore, the Hadza are egalitarian, so there are no real status differences between individuals. While the elderly receive slightly more respect, all individuals are equal to others of the same age and sex, and compared to strictly stratified societies, women are fairly equal to men. This egalitarianism results in high levels of freedom and self-dependence. When conflict arises, one of the parties involved may voluntarily move to another camp as resolution. Ernst Fehr and Urs Fischbacher point out that the Hadza people "exhibit a considerable amount of altruistic punishment" to organize these tribes. The Hadza live in a communal setting and engage in cooperative child rearing, where many people, both related and unrelated, provide high-quality child care.

The Hadza move camp for several reasons. Camps can split when individuals move to resolve conflicts. Camps can be abandoned when someone falls ill and dies, as any illness is associated with the place it was contracted. There is also seasonal migration between dry-season refuges, better hunting grounds when water is more abundant, and areas with large numbers of tubers or berry trees when they are in season. If a man kills a particularly large animal, such as a giraffe, far from home, a camp will temporarily relocate to the kill site. Shelters can be built in a few hours, and most of the possessions owned by an individual can be carried on their back.

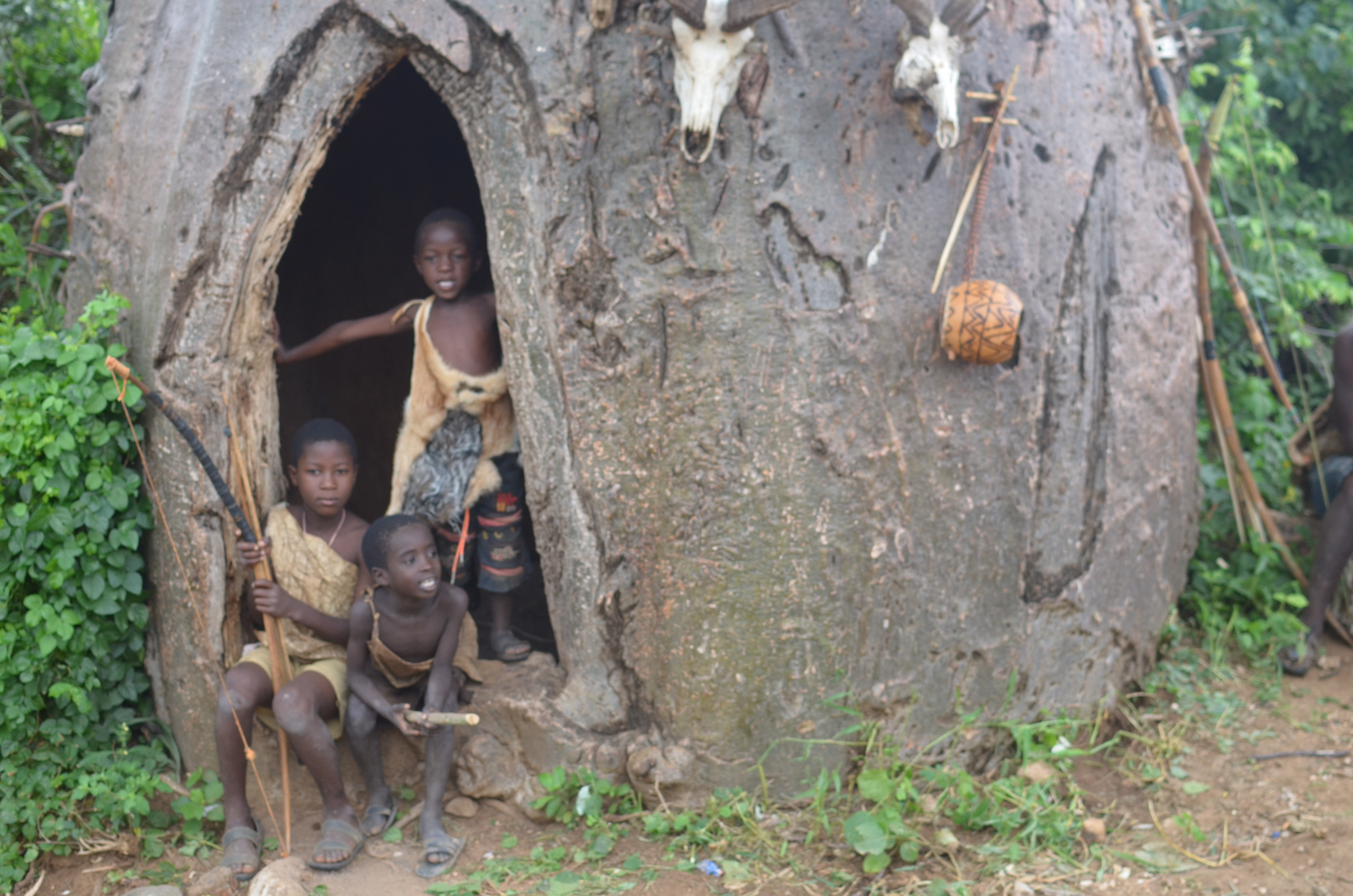
Hadza children

The Hadza are predominantly monogamous, though there is no social enforcement of monogamy. After marriage, the husband and wife are free to live where they decide, which may be with the father or mother's family. This marital residence pattern is called ambilocality and is common among foragers. Specifically among Hadza, there is a slightly higher frequency of married couples living with the mother's kin than with the father's kin. Men and women value traits such as intelligence, strength, ability, skills, dexterity and hard work when evaluating partners. They also value physical attractiveness, and many of their preferences for attractiveness, such as symmetry, averageness and sexually dimorphic voice pitch, are similar to preferences found in Western nations.

A 2001 anthropological study on modern foragers found that the Hadza men and women had an average life expectancy at birth of 33. Life expectancy at age 20 was 39 and the infant mortality rate was 21%. More recently, Hadza adults have frequently lived into their sixties, and some have even reached their seventies or eighties. The Hadza do not keep track of time and age exactly as the Western world does, so these life expectancies are approximate and highly variable.

== Subsistence ==
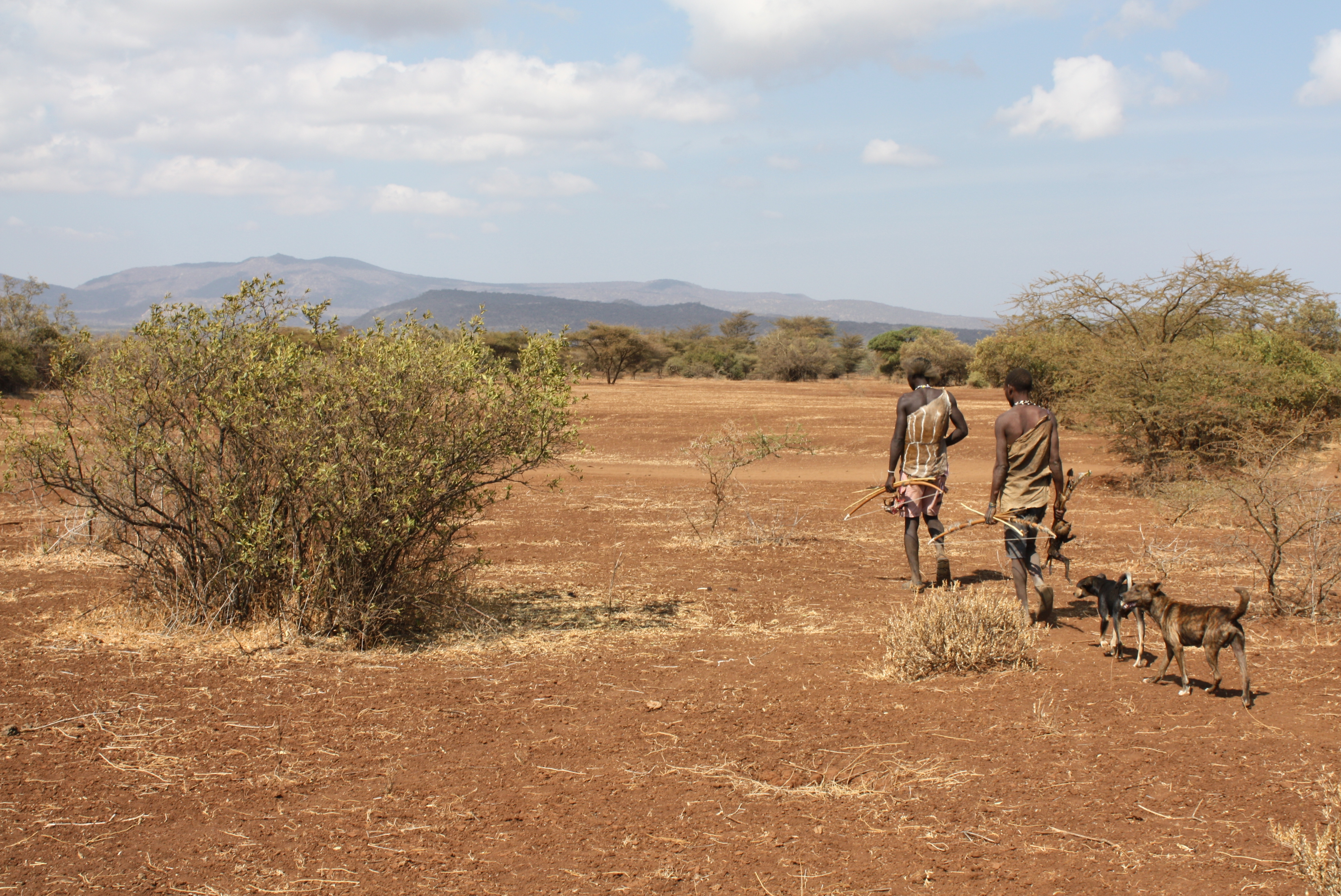
Two Hadza men returning from a hunt

During the wet season, the Hadza diet comprises mostly honey, fruit, tubers, and occasional meat. The contribution of meat to the diet increases in the dry season when game becomes concentrated around water sources. The Hadza also eat tubers and fruit from baobab trees, which give them about 100 to 150 grams of fiber daily.

The Hadza are highly skilled, selective, and opportunistic foragers who adjust their diet according to season and circumstance. Depending on local availability, some groups might rely more heavily on tubers, some on berries, and others on meat. This variability results from their opportunism and ability to adjust to prevailing conditions.

=== Gendered division of labor ===
While men specialize in procuring meat, honey, and baobab fruit, women specialize in tubers, berries, and greens. This division of labor is relatively consistent, but women will occasionally gather a small animal or egg or collect honey, and men will occasionally bring a tuber or some berries back to camp.

Hadza men usually forage individually. During the day, they usually feed themselves while foraging and bring home any additional honey, fruit, or wild game. Women forage in larger parties and usually bring home berries, baobab fruit, and tubers, depending on availability. Men and women also forage cooperatively for honey and fruit; at least one adult male will usually accompany a group of foraging women.

Women's foraging technology includes digging sticks, grass baskets for carrying berries, large fabric or skin pouches for carrying items, knives, shoes, other clothing, and various small items held in a pouch around the neck. Men carry axes, bows, poisoned and non-poisoned arrows, knives, small honey pots, fire drills, shoes and apparel, and various small items.

A myth depicts a woman harvesting the honey of wild bees, and at the same time, declares that the job of honey harvesting belongs to the men. For harvesting honey or fruit from large trees such as the baobab, the Hadza beat pointed sticks into the trunk of the tree to use as ladders. This technique is depicted in a folk tale and documented on film.

=== Hunting ===
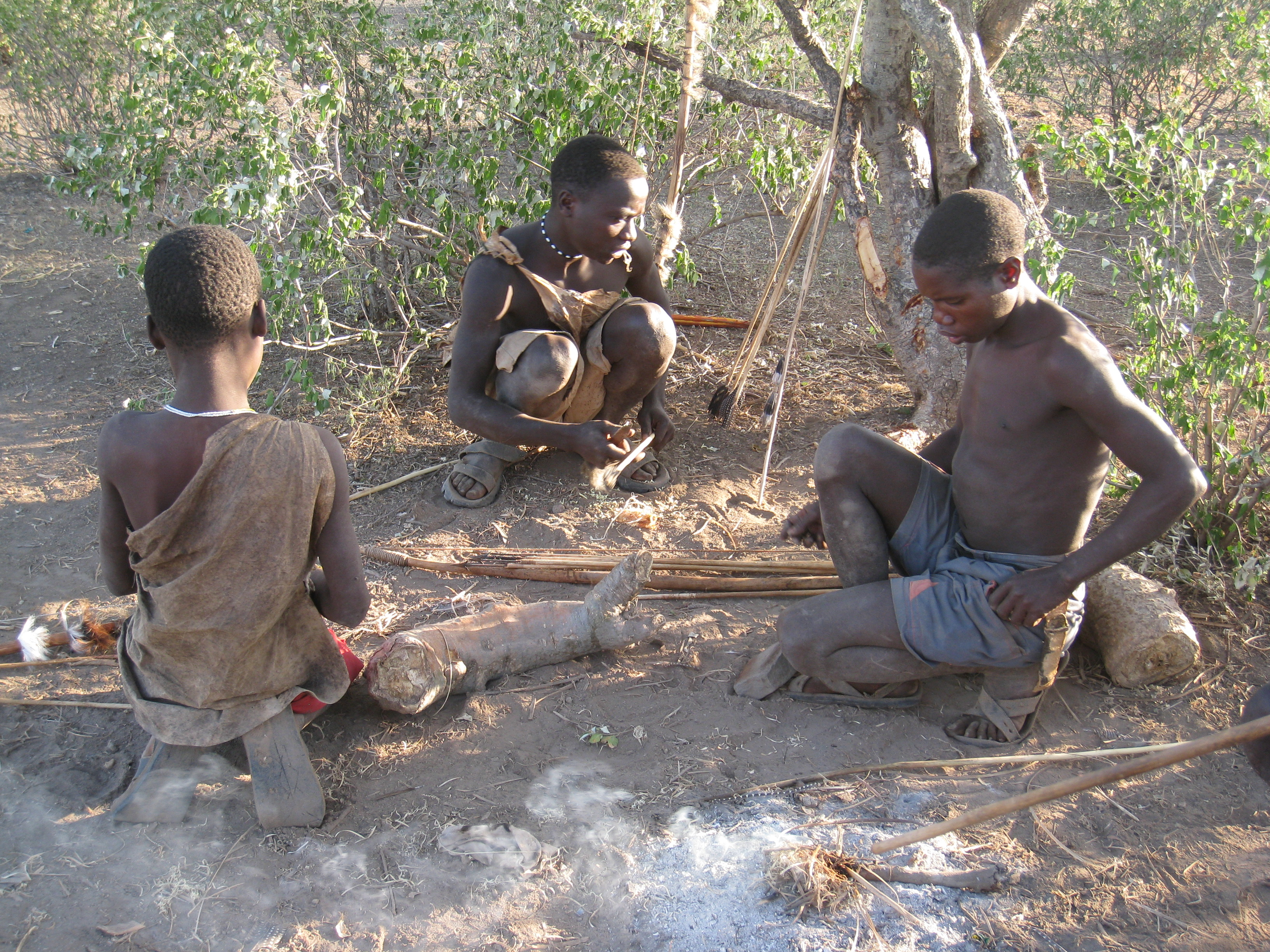
Hadza hunters

During the dry season, men often hunt in pairs and spend entire nights lying in wait by waterholes, hoping to shoot animals that approach for a night-time drink with poisoned bows and arrows. The poison is made of the branches of the shrub Adenium coetaneum. The Hadza hunt and eat a variety of animals including impala, dik-dik, kudu, baboon, vervet monkey, bush baby, shrew, warthog, bushpig and various birds. They also catch fish.

Traditionally, the Hadza do not use hunting dogs, although this custom has been borrowed from neighboring tribes to some degree. Less than 20% of Hadza men use dogs when hunting or foraging.

=== Honey ===
There exists a dynamic relationship of mutualism and manipulation between the Hadza and a wild bird, the greater honeyguide (Indicator indicator). To obtain beeswax, the bird guides people to the nests of wild bees (i.e., Apis mellifera). Sometimes, Hadza men whistle, strike trees, and shout to attract and keep the attention of the honeyguide. Other times, the bird calls to attract the human honey-hunter with a distinctive chatter. Once the honey-hunter has located a bee nest, he uses smoke to subdue the bees and chops his axe into the tree to open the bee nest. The human eats or carries away most of the liquid honey, while the honeyguide consumes beeswax that may be left adhering to the tree, spat out, or otherwise discarded at the site of acquisition. In many cases, instead of actively feeding the honeyguide, Hadza men burn, bury, or hide the wax that remains at the harvest site, intending to keep the honeyguide hungry and more likely to guide again.

The honeyguide also appears in Hadza mythology, both in naturalistic and personified forms. Honey represents a substantial portion of the Hadza diet (~10-20% of calories), which is similar to many other hunter-gatherer societies living in the tropics. Honey likely carried an evolutionary advantage via an improvement in the energy density of the human diet when it contained bee products.

== Religion and folklore ==
=== Religion ===
The Hadza do not follow a formal religion, and it has been claimed that they do not believe in an afterlife. They offer prayers to Ishoko (the Sun) or to Haine (the moon) during hunts and believe they go to Ishoko when they die. They also hold rituals such as the monthly epeme dance for men at the new moon and the less frequent maitoko circumcision and coming-of-age ceremony for women.

==== Epeme ====
The Hadza people embrace epeme, which can be understood as their concept of manhood, hunting, and the relationship between sexes. "True" adult men are called epeme men, which they become by killing large game, usually in their early 20s. Being an epeme comes with an advantage: only epeme men are allowed to eat certain parts of large game animals, such as warthog, giraffe, buffalo, wildebeest, and lion. The parts of these animals that are typically considered epeme are the kidney, lung, heart, neck, tongue, and genitals. No one besides other epeme men are allowed to be present for the epeme meat-eating. If a man still has not killed a large game animal by his thirties, he will automatically be considered epeme and will be allowed to eat the epeme meat.

In addition to eating epeme meat, the epeme men participate in an epeme dance. In Jon Yates's summary of Frank Marlowe's account, this dance occurs every night when the moon isn't visible, and must occur in near-complete darkness, with camp-fires extinguished.

To begin the ritual, the women separate from the men and sit where they cannot be seen. The men gather behind a tree or hut and prepare for the dance. In the pitch dark, as the women begin to sing, the first man starts to dance. He wears a headdress of dark ostrich feathers, bells on one of his ankles, a rattle in his hand, and a long black cape on his back. He stamps his right foot hard on the ground in time with the women's singing, causing the bells to ring while marking the beat of the music with his rattle. He sings out to the women, who answer in a call and response. As the singing grows in strength, the women rise to join the man, who continues to dance—committing his efforts to a family member, one of the women, a friend, or one of his children. At this point, the child may join the dance as well. After each man has danced the epeme two or three times, the ritual is finished, by which time it is close to midnight.

The ritual has been shown to promote social cohesion among the Hadza, and those who share the epeme dance show elevated levels of mutual trust and support.

=== Folklore ===
==== Mythological figures with celestial connotations ====
Ishoko and Haine are mythological figures who are believed to have arranged the world by rolling the sky and the earth like two sheets of leather and swapping their order to put the sky above us; in the past, the sky was under the earth. These figures are described as making crucial decisions about the animals and humans by choosing their food and environment, giving people access to fire, and creating the capability of sitting. These figures have celestial connotations: Ishoko is a solar figure, and Haine, her husband, is a lunar figure. Uttering Ishoko's name can be a greeting or a good wish to someone for a successful hunt.

The character "Ishoye" seems to be another name for Ishoko. She is depicted in some tales as creating animals, including people. Some of her creatures later turned out to be man-eating giants, disastrous for their fellow giants and people. Seeing the disaster, she killed these giants, saying, "You are not people any longer."

==== Culture heroes ====
Indaya, the man who went to the Isanzu territory after his death and returned, plays the role of a culture hero: he introduces customs and goods to the Hadza.

The Isanzu people neighbor the Hadza. They are regarded as peaceful, and the Hadza myths mention and depict this benevolent influence of the Isanzu in their mythology. This advantageous view of the Isanzu gives them a place as heroes in Hadza folklore. In some of the mythical stories about giants, it is an Isanzu man who liberates the Hadza from a malevolent giant.

==== Stories about giants ====
The Hadza have many stories about giants, which describe people with superhuman strength and size but otherwise with human weaknesses. They have human needs, eat and drink, and can be poisoned or cheated.

One of the giants, Sengani (or Sengane), is depicted as Haine's helper. As the story goes, Haine gave him the power to rule over the people. In Haine's absence, the giant endangered people with his decisions. The people resisted his choices, so the giant ordered the lions to attack them. This surprised the humans, who had previously regarded lions as harmless. The people killed the giant in revenge.

This giant had brothers, rendered as "Ssaabo" and "Waonelakhi" in Kohl-Larsen. Several tales describe the disaster these giants caused by constantly killing and beating the Hadza. The Hadza had to ask for help from neighboring groups, and finally, the giants were tricked and either poisoned or shot to death by poison arrows.

Another story tells of a man-eating giant, rendered as "!Esengego" by Kohl-Larsen. He and his family were killed by a benevolent snake, which turned out to be the remedy applied by the goddess Ishoko to liberate people. Ishoko changed the corpses of the giant family into leopards. She prohibited them from attacking people unless an arrow provoked or wounded them.

Another giant, rendered "!Hongongoschá" by Kohl-Larsen, appears as a different sort of mythological figure. He did not bother the Hadza much in his tales, only secretly stealing small things at night. His nourishment was the flowers of trees (and occasionally stolen vegetables). The people greeted him with great respect, and the giant wished them good luck in hunting. This changed when a boy deliberately injured the giant, and though he attempted to provide goodwill, !Hongongoschá took revenge by killing the boy. Finally, the god Haine determined a course of justice: he warned the people, revealed the boy's malevolent deed, and changed the giant into a big white clam.

== See also ==
- Aka people
- Baka people
- Bushmen
- Bongo people
- !Kung people
- Mbuti people
- Twa peoples
