= Buger (disambiguation) =

Buger is a village in Iran.

Buger may also refer to:

- Búger, a small municipality in the Balearic Islands, Spain
- Buger (Tanzanian ward), an administrative ward in Tanzania
