= Saigilo =

Saigilo (fl. 1890) was a Datooga King and medicine man reputed for his purported skill in thaumaturgy and divination, which has led to his establishment as a folk figure within Iraqw and Datooga society in present-day Karatu District in Arusha Region, northern Tanzania.

== Early life ==
=== Exodus of the Bajuta ===
In a decisive battle that took place between 1836 and 1851 located in the vicinity of Ngorongoro crater, the Datooga were defeated and expelled from the area by the Maasai. This led the father of Saigilo, named Magena, and his tribal group, termed Bajuta, to withdraw to Sukumaland. However, they were once again attacked by Maasai raiders, and resettled in Mashonghoda, near Tabora in Nyamwezi land. It was there that Magena died. Following the death of Magena, the Bajuta chose Saigilo to succeed him as the leader of the tribe.

== Leader of the Bajuta ==
=== Migrations ===
Fearing continued attacks from the Masai, Saigilo migrated with the rest of the Bajuta northwards to Raho, in the Gummenti basin. It is believed that Saigilo and his followers stayed there for some time before migrating southeast, finally settling in Maiba near Mbulu, around 1890 or later. The area surrounding Mbulu was already populated with members of the Iraqw tribe.

=== Datooga-Iraqw interactions ===
Relations between the Iraqw and the Datooga were amicable and marked by cooperation, due to the pastoral nature of both tribes. The Iraqw would participate in the cattle-breeding ceremonies of the Datooga, and Saigilo, as chief medicine man of the Bajuta, was thought to have the ability to produce medications that would increase the fertility of the cattle, which were traded extensively among the Iraqw. In addition, intermarriage between the Datoga and Iraqw was commonplace, as a result of similar cultural and economic orders and Iraqw exogamic traditions. The close relations of the Iraqw and the Datoga are demonstrated by the Iraqw concept of homoo, a negative term used to generally describe members of another ethnic group; however, the Datooga were never referred to by this term, potentially indicating a significant bond between the two groups.

=== Prophecies ===
Saigilo was renowned for his purported abilities in divination, with his alleged skills manifesting themselves well before his ascension to tribal chief. It is said that prior to the exodus from Ngorongoro crater to Nyamwezi land, Saigilo had warned the tribe thrice to flee until the encroachment of the Maasai, famine, and disease finally forced them to withdraw and begin their aforementioned exodus.

The Arimi, a neighboring tribe, frequently consulted Saigilo. According to oral tradition, in a dream Saigilo allegedly destroyed a barrier he had erected between the people of his tribe and the coast, hoping that assistance in repelling the Maasai would come from the east in the form of the ‘red men.’ The ‘red men’ were said to be among the first settlers of Tanganyika, appeared to be of European descent, and whose disappearance would bring about famine and destruction. The disappearance of the ‘red men’ are said to be compelled by Murungu, a Bantu creator deity, whenever the universe becomes unbalanced. Saigilo said that ‘red men without toes’ should be welcomed as they would bring great prosperity. The arrival of German colonial forces was heralded as the return of the ‘red men,’ due to their European features and their boots, which made it appear as if they lacked toes. However, the Germans would eventually defile Tita (the shrine to Murungu) and persecute the tribes in the surrounding area.

Saigilo's prophecies still remain culturally relevant in Tanzanian society today. At the end of the 19th century, Saigilo allegedly predicted extensive ecological change in Iraqw land, claiming that bushland and trees of non-local origin would dominate the landscape and that one would no longer have to travel far for firewood. Curiously, this is exactly the case today, with Iraqw land being populated with eucalyptus and black wattle, flora typically native to Australia. This was the result of reforestation campaigns undertaken by the British colonial regime in the mid-20th century.

Recent efforts to introduce sex education and safe sex practices to the Datooga have been meet with disapproval, partly due to one of Saigilo's prophecies. Attempts to promote monogamy and the use of condoms are seen as violations of traditional Datooga sexual and marriage practices, with the violation of the latter believed to lead to sexual degeneracy. Saigilo allegedly claimed that once the Datooga start to ignore “respectful coupling,” or in other words, traditional sexual behavior, this would thereby lead to sexual promiscuity and would be “the end [of the Datooga people].” The credence the Datoga give to this apocalyptic prophecy continues to shape current sexual practice and perceptions.

== Later life and death ==
At some point during his establishment near Mbulu, Saigilo's homestead was subject to a raid by the Maasai, and Saigilo was injured as a result. This attack was believed to have been perpetrated by Be’a, a Manda medicine man who allegedly used magic to compel the raid. Saigilo later died in Maiba.

=== Succession of leadership and future of the Datoga ===
Saigilo's son by his senior wife, Gidamowsa, succeeded Saigilo as leader of the Bajuta and migrated with the members of his tribe to Dongobesh, the ancestral home of the Gisamijanga. In 1910, Gidamowsa, along with eleven medicine men, including elders of the Daremngajega clan and an elder of the Mbulu Iraqw, were accused of vandalizing weapons belonging to German colonial forces. They were captured and executed by hanging. It is believed that the executions were the result of the German colonial authority's fears regarding the group's influence on the Datooga and neighboring tribes. The executions led to waning Datooga influence in the region as a result of the reluctance of Datooga medicine men to continue to perform magical acts and religious ceremonies, which thereby led to an increase in Iraqw influence. Later interactions between the Datoga and colonists were punctuated by similar instances of persecution, including execution, arbitrary imprisonment, and property confiscation and taxation.
