= Deepak Obhrai =

Tanzania-born Canadian politician (1950–2019)

The Honourable Deepak Obhrai PC
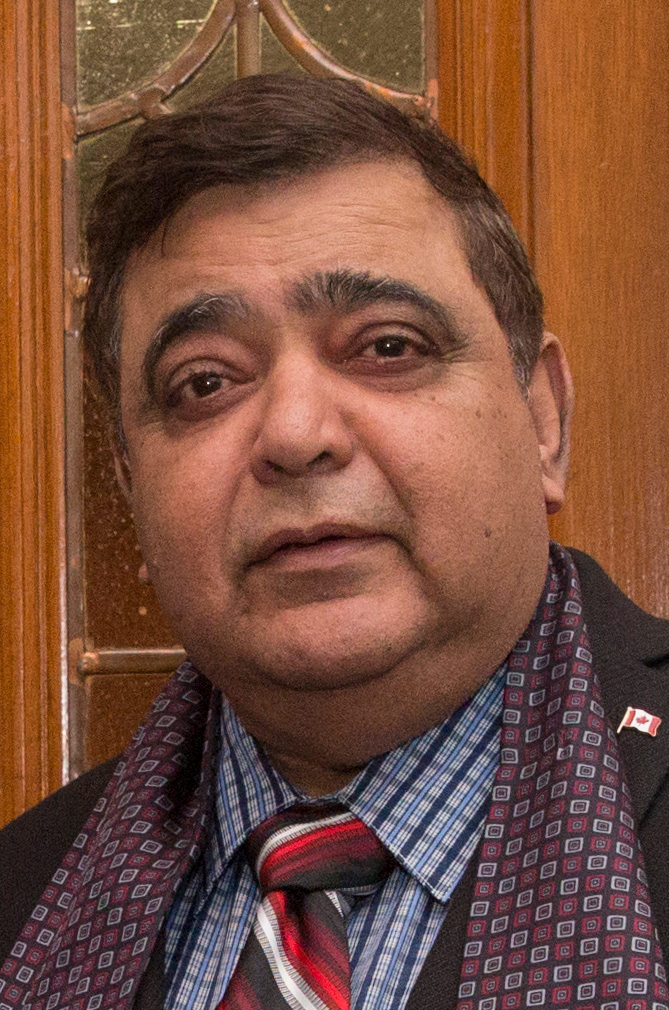
- Obhrai in 2017

Official Opposition Critic for International Development
- In office November 20, 2015 – July 12, 2016
- Leader: Rona Ambrose
- Preceded by: Hélène Laverdière
- Succeeded by: Dean Allison

Member of Parliament for Calgary Forest Lawn (Calgary East; 1997–2015)
- In office June 2, 1997 – August 2, 2019
- Preceded by: Riding established
- Succeeded by: Jasraj Hallan

Personal details
- Born: July 5, 1950 Oldeani, Tanganyika (now Oldeani, Tanzania)
- Died: August 2, 2019 (aged 69) Calgary, Alberta, Canada
- Party: Conservative
- Other political affiliations: Reform Party, Canadian Alliance
- Spouse: Neena Obhrai (until 2019, his death)
- Occupation: Businessman, politician
- Website: www.deepakobhrai.com

Deepak Obhrai PC (July 5, 1950 – August 2, 2019) was a Canadian politician, representing the riding of Calgary East (until 2015) and Forest Lawn (from 2015) for the Reform Party of Canada and then the Conservative Party of Canada from 1997 until he died in 2019. He previously served as the Parliamentary Secretary to the Minister of Foreign Affairs. He was the first Hindu to become an MP in Canada, and at the time of his death was the longest continuously serving Conservative MP. He ran in the 2017 Conservative Party of Canada leadership election, but was defeated in the first round of voting.

== Early life and career ==
Obhrai was born on July 5, 1950, in Oldeani, Tanganyika, now Tanzania, to a Hindu family. His father died when Obhrai was six, so he was raised by his mother, who worked at a bank. Obhrai went to primary school in Moshi, a town near Mount Kilimanjaro, and went to high school in Arusha before transferring to the prestigious Daly College in Indore, India. He moved to the United Kingdom and trained as an air traffic controller. Disillusioned by the discrimination he faced in Britain, he returned to Tanzania to work. In 1976, Obhrai was on duty at a nearby Tanzanian airport when the Entebbe raid took place in neighbouring Uganda.

Obhrai immigrated to Canada in 1977 with his wife Neena, whom he had married in 1971, and his daughter Priti. He originally wanted to immigrate to Montreal, but decided to avoid Quebec and go to Calgary instead because of the recent election of René Lévesque's secessionist Parti Québécois. Obhrai retrained as an accountant in Calgary and got a job with the municipal government. With his wife, he established a dry cleaning business that expanded to three stores.

In the 1990s Obhrai became more involved in Calgary community life, serving as the president of the India-Canada Association of Calgary, the Monterey Park Community Association, and the Hindu Society of Calgary. He also was the vice-president responsible for Alberta in the National Indo-Canadian Council.

=== Municipal and provincial politics ===
In 1993, Obhrai lost a race for an alderman position on Calgary City Council. He launched failed bids for the Progressive Conservative nomination for a provincial by-election in Calgary-McCall in 1995 and for Calgary-Montrose in 1996.

== Federal politics ==
Obhrai's successful bid for the Reform Party of Canada nomination in the 1997 federal election was initially obstructed by the local riding association, prompting officials from the office of the party leader, Preston Manning, to intervene. He won the nomination and the riding and was re-elected when the Reform Party became the Canadian Alliance in 2000. In 2004, 2006, 2008, 2011, and 2015 he was elected as a member of the Conservative Party of Canada. He was also one of four Alliance MPs who agreed to sit with the Progressive Conservative caucus after the December 9, 2003, creation of the merged Conservative Party. The Progressive Conservative and Canadian Alliance parliamentary caucuses were not officially merged until a few weeks later.

As an opposition member, he served as the Opposition critic for International Cooperation, Multiculturalism, International Trade, and CIDA.

In February 2006, Prime Minister Stephen Harper appointed Obhrai as Parliamentary Secretary to the Minister of Foreign Affairs. In March 2008, he was given the additional responsibility of Parliamentary Secretary to the Minister of International Cooperation, a role he held until November 2008; he would hold the role again from November 2010 to January 2011.

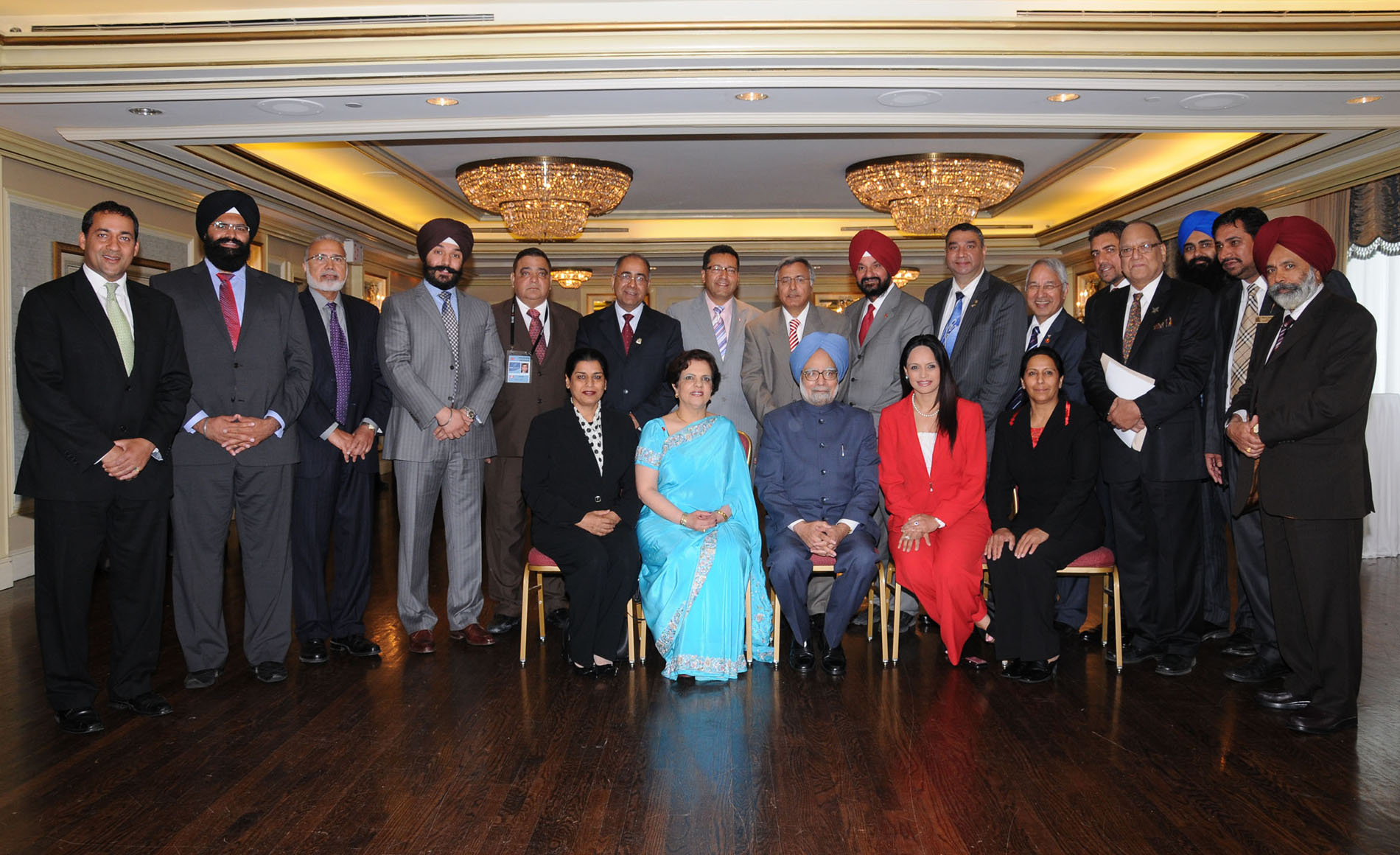
Obhrai with Manmohan Singh in Toronto on June 28, 2010

During the 2011 Canadian federal election, Obhrai chose not to appear in an all-candidates debate in his riding, citing that his time was better spent talking with constituents. He also said that he "does not wish to debate a Liberal from Toronto," a reference to Calgary East Liberal candidate Josipa Petrunic, who despite her employment by the University of Toronto, was born and raised in Calgary, which was also where she conducted her research.

As a result of Gurbax Singh Malhi's defeat in the 2011 election, Obhrai became the longest serving member of parliament who was of South Asian and/or African ancestry. Obhrai penned a letter to the editor to the Calgary Herald and to his supporters saying that: "In my birth country, Tanzania, I would henceforth be referred to by the respectful title of Mzee. In South Asia, I would receive the title of Pradhaan. This means I have now reached the ranks of respected elders."

On September 19, 2013, Obhrai's role as Parliamentary Secretary to the Minister of Foreign Affairs was augmented when his role was expanded to include responsibility for international human rights. He was appointed to the Queen's Privy Council for Canada by Governor General of Canada David Johnston on the advice of Stephen Harper.

In September 2014, Obhrai received the Pride of India Award from the Indo-American Friends Group of Washington, D.C., and the Indo-American Business Chamber in a dinner ceremony held on Capitol Hill for his contributions towards strengthening Canada's political, social, and cultural relations with India and for his role in increasing Indian diaspora participation in pluralistic political activity.

Obhrai was the longest-serving Conservative MP in Canada's 42nd Parliament. Obhrai served as the International Development Critic in the Shadow Cabinet of Rona Ambrose, before resigning from the Shadow Cabinet to seek the Conservative Party leadership.

=== Conservative leadership campaign ===
Obhrai ran in the 2017 Conservative Party of Canada leadership election. The focus of his campaign was promoting Conservative outreach to immigrant communities and opposing proposals by fellow leadership candidate Kellie Leitch to screen immigrants for Canadian values. Having received 0.41% of the vote on the first ballot, Obhrai was eliminated after the first round.

=== Post-leadership run ===
Obhrai did not return to the Shadow Cabinet under new Conservative Leader Andrew Scheer.

In December 2017, it was reported that Obhrai was being challenged for the Conservative nomination in Calgary Forest Lawn for the 2019 election by former Calgary-East MLA Moe Amery.

== Personal life ==
Obhrai married his wife Neena in 1971 and immigrated to Canada in 1977 along with their daughter Priti. After Obhrai's death in 2019, his son Aman lost the conservative nomination to succeed his father as Conservative candidate in Calgary Forest Lawn in the federal election later that year by Jasraj Singh Hallan. His daughter Priti Obhrai-Martin was the Liberal Party of Canada candidate in Calgary East for the 2025 federal election.

=== Death ===
Obhrai died of liver cancer on August 2, 2019, in Calgary. He had been diagnosed with the disease just a few weeks earlier. He was the longest-serving Conservative member of Parliament. A memorial service was held in Calgary several weeks after Obhrai's death. Stephen Harper and Andrew Scheer were among those who spoke at the service.
