= John Stephen Akhwari =

Tanzanian marathon runner

- Born: 1938 (age 87–88)
- Known for: Tanzanian former marathon runner

John Stephen Akhwari (born 1938 in Mbulu, Tanganyika) is a Tanzanian former marathon runner from the Iraqw tribe. He represented Tanzania internationally and was an African champion in the event.

He gained worldwide fame for completing the men's marathon in last place despite serious injury at the 1968 Summer Olympics in Mexico City.

== Athletic career ==
Akhwari competed for many years before and after the 1968 Olympics. He finished first in the African Marathon Championships before the Olympics. He finished fifth in the marathon at the 1970 Commonwealth Games where he ran a 2:15:05 time. The winner had run 2:09:28. In those same Games he ran a 28:44 in the 10,000 meter race and was only about 30 seconds behind the leaders. He ran marathons in the 2:20 range on a regular basis both before and after the 1968 Olympics. He was a world class runner for most of the 1960s and 1970s.

== 1968 Olympic marathon ==
While competing in the marathon in Mexico City, Akhwari cramped up due to the high altitude of the city. He had not trained at such an altitude back in his country. At the 19 kilometer point during the 42 km race, there was jockeying for position between some runners, and he was hit. He fell, badly wounding his shoulder and dislocating his knee, but continued running and eventually finished last among the 57 competitors who completed the race (75 had started). The winner of the marathon, Mamo Wolde of Ethiopia, finished in 2:20:26. Akhwari finished in 3:25:27, when there were only a few thousand people left in the stadium, and the sun had set. A television crew was sent out from the medal ceremony when word was received that there was one more runner about to finish.

As he finally crossed the finish line a cheer came from the small crowd. His bravery in completing the distance injured and alone was immediately noted by international media as an example of the 'Olympic spirit', with one journalist writing "Today we have seen...a performance that gives meaning to the word courage. All honor to John Stephen Akhwari of Tanzania." When interviewed later and asked why he had continued running, he said, "My country did not send me 5,000 miles to start the race; they sent me 5,000 miles to finish the race." Akhwari later received a medal of honor from his home country for his efforts.

== Post-Athletic career ==
Akhwari has lived for many years in his village with his wife and children. They are farmers and work very hard in the fields. He was awarded a National Hero Medal of Honor in 1983. He lent his name to the John Stephen Akhwari Athletic Foundation, an organization which supports Tanzanian athletes training for the Olympic Games. He was invited to the 2000 Olympics in Sydney, Australia to present the men's marathon medals. He later appeared in Beijing as a goodwill ambassador in preparation for the 2008 Olympics. He was a torchbearer in Dar es Salaam, Tanzania on April 13, 2008, for the Olympic torch relay through his country.
