= Mangola =

Mangola may be,

- Mang'ola, Tanzania
- Duke's Mangola drink
