= Daa, Arusha =

Ward in Karatu, Arusha, Tanzania

Daa
- Ward
- Kata ya Daa
- Location within Tanzania
- Coordinates: 03°25′06″S 35°29′09″E
- Country: Tanzania
- Region: Arusha Region
- District: Karatu District

Population (2012)
  - Total: 9,868

Daa is an administrative ward in the Karatu district of the Arusha Region of Tanzania. According to the 2012 census, the ward has a total population of 9,868.
