= Mbulumbulu =

Ward in Karatu, Arusha, Tanzania

- Ward
- Kata ya Mbulumbulu
- Location within Tanzania
- Coordinates: 3°15′S 35°48′E
- Country: Tanzania
- Region: Arusha Region
- District: Karatu District

Population (2012)
  - Total: 21,764

Mbulumbulu is an administrative ward in the Karatu district of the Arusha Region of Tanzania. According to the 2012 census, the ward has a total population of 21,764.
