= Exercise paradox =

Physiologic phenomenon

The exercise paradox, also known as the workout paradox, refers to the finding that physical activity, while essential for maintaining overall health, does not necessarily lead to significant weight loss or increased calorie expenditure. This paradox challenges the common belief that more exercise equates to more calories burned and consequently, more weight loss.

== Hadza tribe case study ==
The exercise paradox emerged from studies comparing calorie expenditure between different populations. Fieldwork on the Hadza people, a hunter-gatherer tribe in Tanzania, revealed that despite their high levels of physical activity, the tribe burned a similar number of calories per day as sedentary individuals in industrialized societies. This finding, led by Duke University professor Herman Pontzer, contradicted the expectation that more active lifestyles would result in higher energy expenditures.

In 2012, Pontzer and his team of researchers analyzed energy expenditure in 30 Hadza adults using the doubly labeled water method. Participants consumed water enriched with two distinct isotopes of hydrogen and oxygen. The team later assessed the concentration of these isotopes in urine samples, which correlates with the body's daily carbon dioxide production and, consequently, daily energy expenditure.

Results indicated that Hadza women burned an average of 1,877 calories per day, which was nearly the same as the 1,864 calories burned daily by women in industrialized nations. Hadza men expended about 2,649 calories per day, which was within the standard error distribution for average calories burned by men per day in industrialized nations.

The studies suggest that controlling caloric intake may be more necessary for managing weight than exercise alone.

== Studies on other population groups ==
A 2011 meta-analysis of 98 studies found that individuals in low to middle-HDI countries (specifically, Bolivia, Cameroon, China, Gambia, Guatemala, India, Jamaica, Nigeria, Russia, South Africa, and Eswatini) showed no significant differences in energy expenditure compared to individuals in middle to high-HDI countries (specifically, the countries of Europe, United States, Canada, Mexico, Cuba, Chile, Brazil, Japan, Australia, and New Zealand), despite large differences in each country's obesity rate.

== See also ==
- Benefits of physical activity
- Plateau effect
- Set point theory
