= Burn: The Misunderstood Science of Metabolism =

2022 book by Herman Pontzer

Burn
- Author: Herman Pontzer
- Published: 02 June 2022 (UK)
- ISBN: 978-0-141-99017-0

Burn: The Misunderstood Science of Metabolism is a 2022 book written by Herman Pontzer in which he discusses metabolism, human health and use of energy in the human body. The book examines research and proposes a constrained approach to total energy expenditure.
