= Karatu District =

District in Arusha Region, Tanzania

Karatu District Wilaya ya Karatu (Swahili)
- District of Arusha
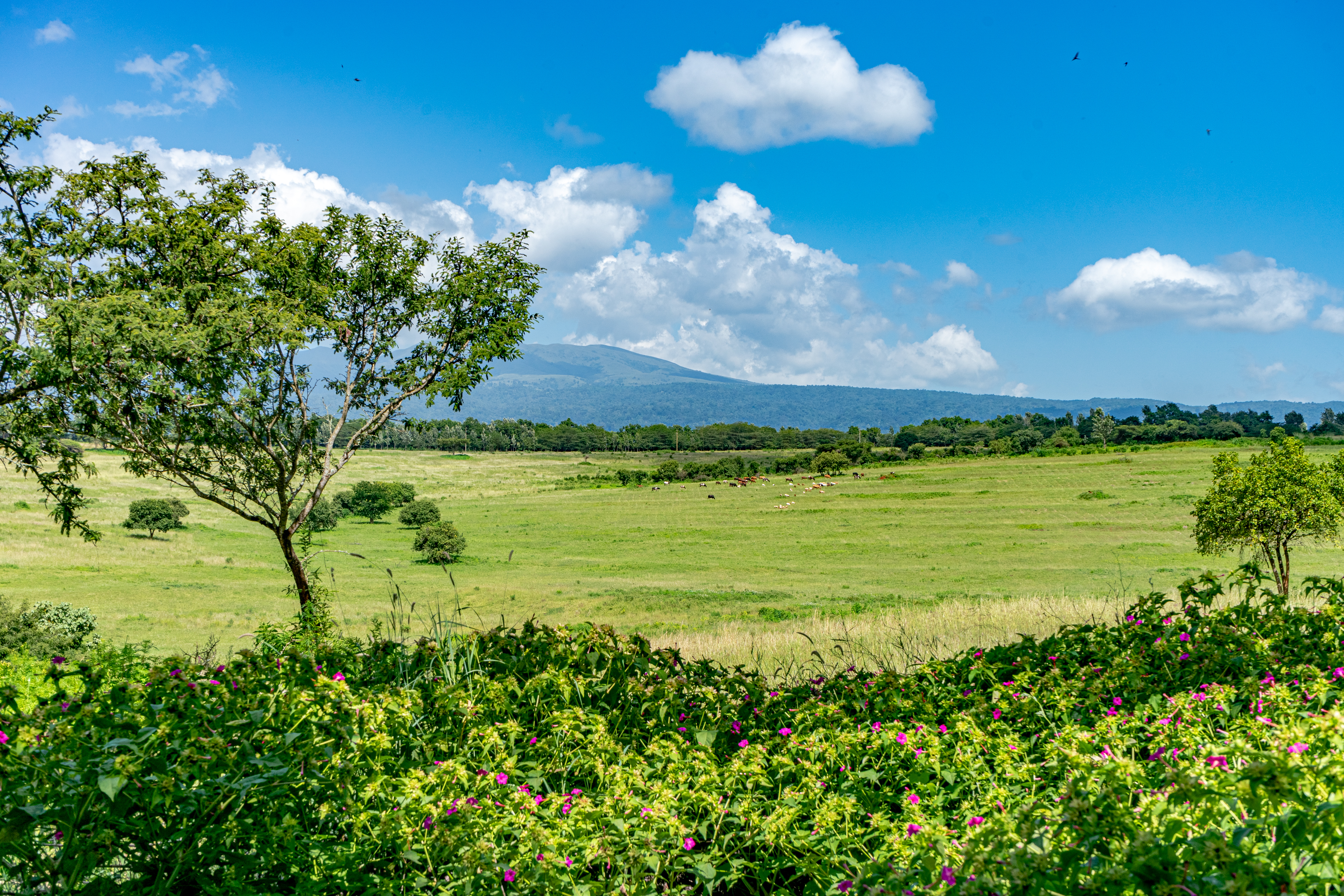
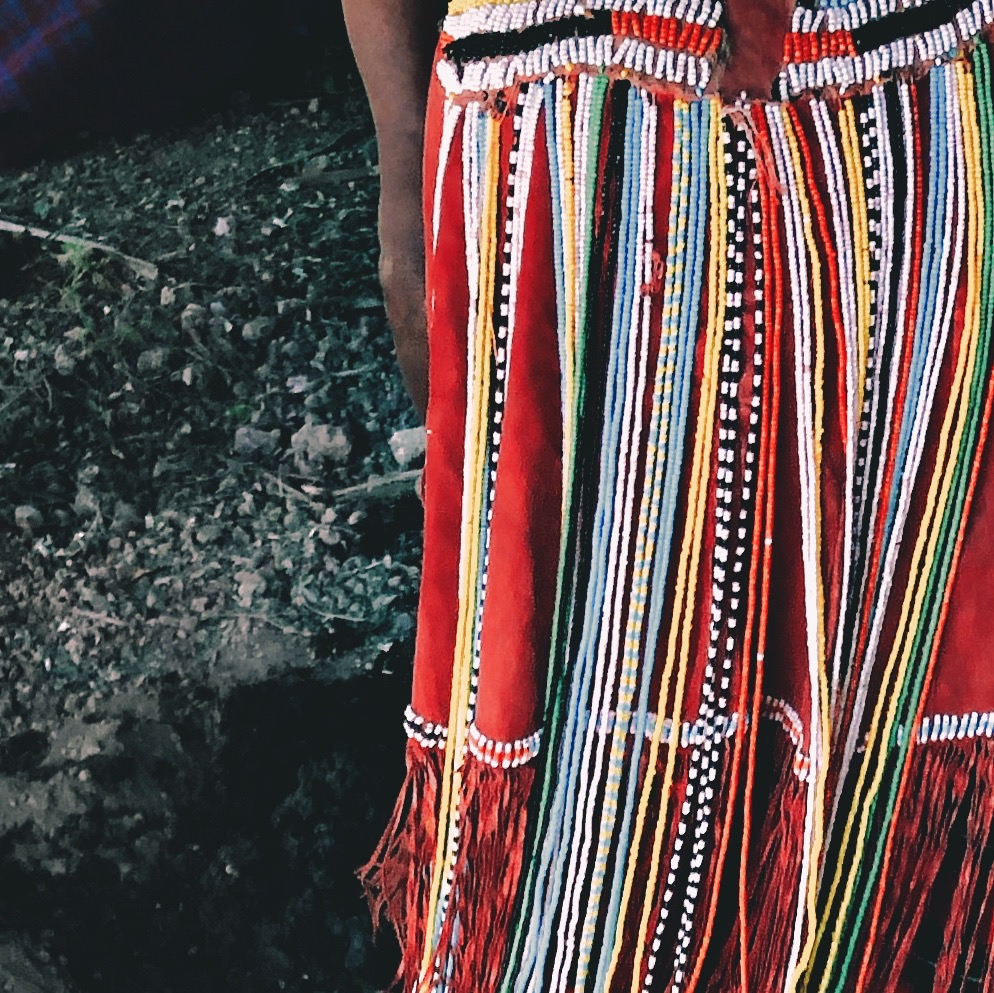
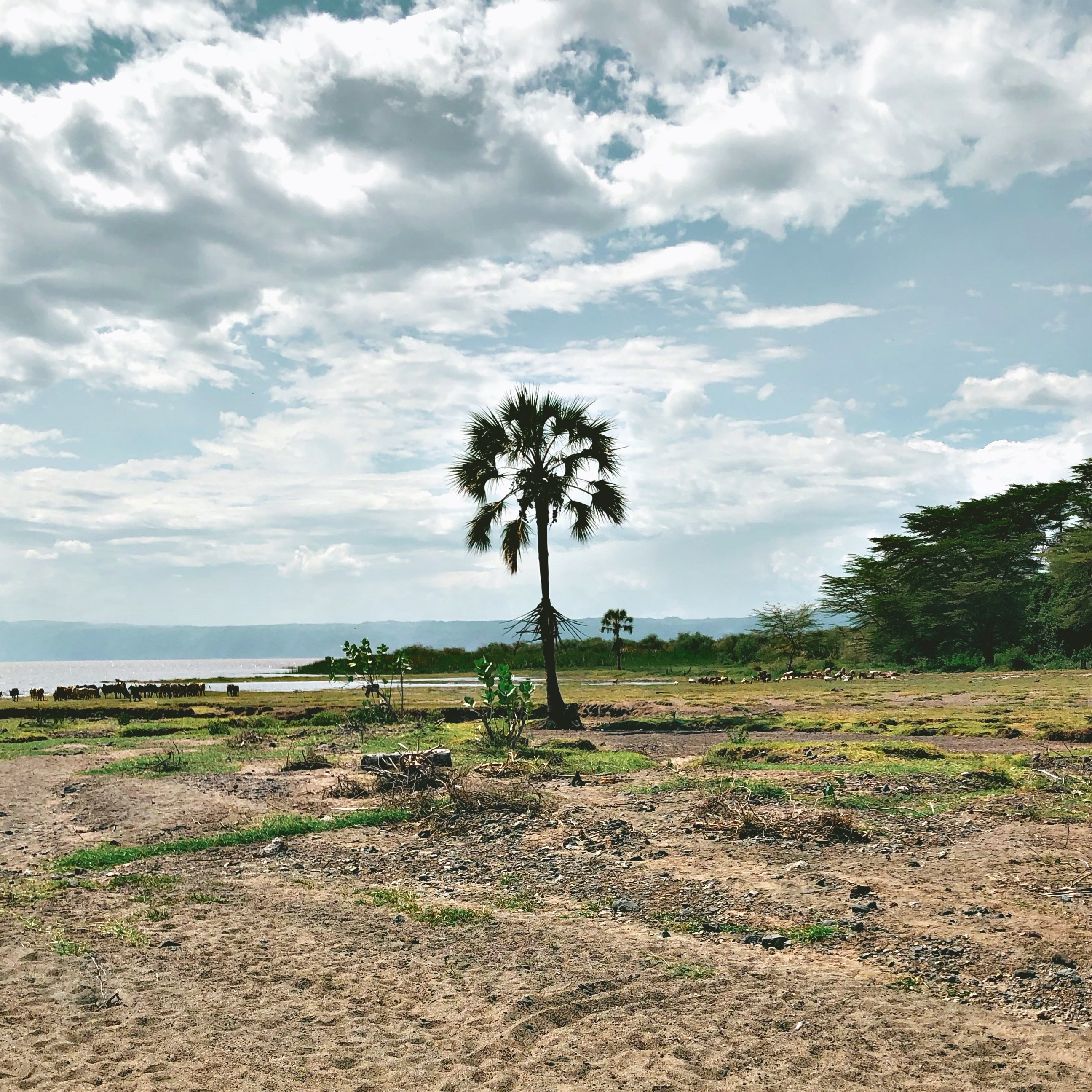
- From top to bottom: Karatu Landscape, Datooga Skirt in Karatu and Lake Eyasi In Baray Ward
- Nicknames: Home of the Hadzabe; The onion capital of Tanzania
- Karatu District in Arusha
- Coordinates: 03°20′43.44″S 35°40′10.92″E
- Country: Tanzania
- Region: Arusha Region
- District: 1997
- Capital: Karatu Town

Area
  - Total: 3,207 km^{2} (1,238 sq mi)
  - Rank: 4th in Arusha
- Highest elevation (Marang Mountains): 1,910 m (6,270 ft)

Population (2022)
  - Total: 280,454
  - Rank: 4th in Arusha
  - Density: 87.45/km^{2} (226.5/sq mi)
- Demonym: Karatuan

Ethnic groups
  - Settler: Swahili
  - Native: Hadza, Datooga & Iraqw
- Time zone: UTC+3 (EAT)
- Tanzanian Postcode: 236xx
- Website: Official website
- Symbols of Tanzania
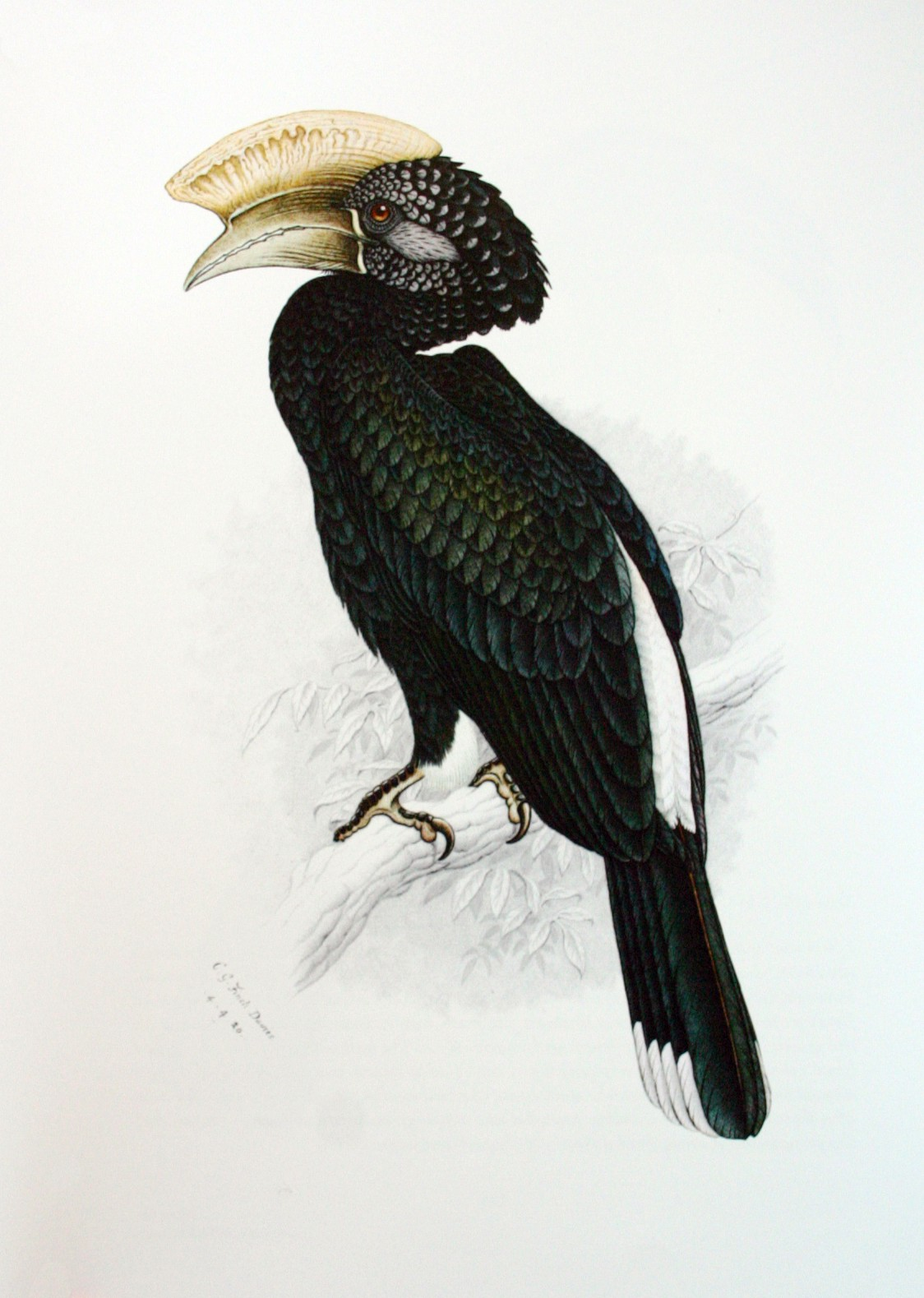
- Bird: Silvery-cheeked hornbill

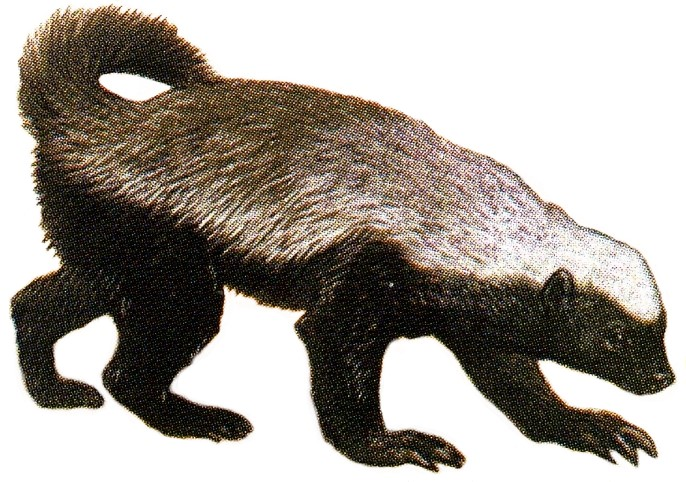
- Mammal: Honey badger

Karatu District (Swahili: Wilaya ya Karatu) is one of seven districts of the Arusha Region of Tanzania. The district is bordered to the north by the Ngorongoro District and to the west by the Meatu District in the Simiyu Region. The district is bordered to the east by the Monduli District, and to the south and southeast by the Mbulu District and the Babati District. The district covers an area of 3,207 km^{2} (1,238 sq mi). The district is comparable in size to the land area of Samoa. The district has a max elevation of 1,739 m (5,705 ft) on Oldeani Peak. Predominantly settled by Iraqw, Karatu district is home to the hunter-gatherer community of the Hadza people. Also Karatu is known agriculturally as the onion capital of Tanzania. The district capital is the town of Karatu. According to the 2022 census, the population of the district was 280,454.

== Geography ==
Karatu District is located between three major natural features in Arusha region. Physically, it is bordered to the east by Lake Manyara and to the south west the district is bordered by Lake Eyasi. In the north east the district is bordered by the Ngorongoro Crater rim. Northern Karatu district is very fertile due to the many streams and volcanic soil from the Ngorongoro highlands. The south west side of the district in the Eyasi basi is semi arid. Karatu district is the fourth largest district in Arusha region at 3,300 square kilometers, slightly larger than the island country of Samoa.

=== Climate ===
The district's climate differs from one place to the next. Annual rainfall in the Eyasi basin averages between 300mm and 400mm, whereas in Karatu town it is between 900mm and 1000mm. The intensity of the rain in April can be high enough to cause significant erosion. Short and long rains are usually separated by one or two months of relatively less rain in most regions. The District has four seasons: short rainy-extended seasons from November to December, short and hot dry seasons from January to March and mid-May, and lengthy and cold seasons from June to October.

Karatu District is divided into three agro-ecological zones: the Highland bordering Ngorongoro, the Midland bordering the Marang forest, and the Lowlands bordering the Lake Eyasi Basin. Zone of the Highlands are: Lositete, Upper Kitete, Slahhamo, Kambi ya Simba, Kilimatembo, Rhotia Kati, Kainam Rhotia, Ayalabe, Tloma, Oldeani, Getamock, Buger, Ayalalio, Endonyawe, and Makhoromba are all included. The Highland zone is located between 1400-2000m above sea level and receives 600-800mm of rain per year. It has a clay loam soil type.

Locations such as; Chemchem, Kilimamoja, Gyekrum Lambo, Gyekrum Arusha, Gongali, Bashay Qurus, Endashangwet, Changarawe, Bassodawish, Endamarariek, Khusmayi, Endallah, Qaru, Endabash, Kambi ya Faru, Laja, and Ngaibara are all part of the Midlands Zone. The zone is located between 900 and 1400 meters above sea level and receives more than 600mm of rain every year. The soil is clay loam sand.

The lowlands includes Matala, Dumbechand, Jobaj, Mbuga Nyekundu, Qangdend, Endamaghan, Maleckchand, Mang'ola Barazani, and Laghangarer. It receives more than 300mm of rain every year. The soil type is sand slit loam.

== Economy ==
Agriculture and livestock keeping account for more than 85% of Karatu's economic activities. There are no businesses. Some people work in retail establishments in Manyara and Karatu towns, as well as Endabash, Oldeani, and Mang'ola commercial centers.

=== Infrastructure and mass communication ===
The District has a total road network length of 713 km, of which the regional road accounts for 253 km. 52 kilometers of the 253 kilometers are tarmac roads, while 460 kilometers are district roads, with 76.3 kilometers being gravel and 383.7 kilometers being earth roads. There are five airstrips in the area: Manyara, Qurus, Matala, Qangdend, and Buger. Only Manyara has a commercial airport. Vodacom, Tigo, Zain, and Zantel operate 548 telephone lines (TTCL) and a cellular network. Paved trunk road T17 from Arusha to the Ngorongoro National Park passes through the district.

As of 2016, the district per capita income is still expected to be 800,000/= TZS each year. Other important indicators of development include the following: literacy rate of 64%, population growth rate of 3.1, dependency ratio of 97, employment in agriculture 61%, livestock keeping 7.49%, office 3.14%, elementary occupation 21.33%, plant operations/assemble 0.37%, business operation 3%, hand hoes owned by 79% of the population, sex ratio of 108, energy consumption (electricity) is 4%, and firewood is 96%.

=== Agriculture ===
The district's total arable land area is 1,025.75 square kilometers, accounting for 31.1% of the entire area. The potential land for irrigation agriculture is 6,231ha, with approximately 4,050ha under irrigation. The springs of Qang'nded, Manyara (Chemchem), and Endashangwet provide water. The District has 102,573 acres of arable ground for farming. Coffee, onion, wheat, barley, pigeon peas, and sunflower are the main income crops, while maize, beans, finger millet, and sorghum are the important food crops. In 2015/2016, the District cultivated 48,197.1 ha of food crops and 27,782.5 ha of cash crops. In 2015/16, maize production was 81,112.8 tonnes, equivalent to 15 to 20 bags per acre. Farmers in the district are advanced in agriculture since 65% of them utilize hybrid seeds, artificial fertilizers, and tractors in farm preparation. The average maize production per hector is 3 tonnes in rainfed areas and 5.75 tonnes in irrigation areas.

Livestock husbandry is an essential economic activity for Karatu District people. According to estimates, the council has 811,360 animals, including 271,885 cattle and 373,588 goats and sheep. Pigs (12,816), chickens (165, 887), chicken broilers (46,766), and donkeys are among the other livestock kept in the district (9116). Milk production for daily cattle increased from 8 to 10 liters per day, while indigenous cattle climbed from 1.5 to 3 liters per day. In 2015, 97,879,190 liters were produced for dairy cattle.

=== Industry ===
Industrialization is making steady progress, especially in small-scale industrial facilities relative to medium and large-scale establishments. There are 5 small-scale companies that mostly process agricultural and livestock products; 1 medium-sized industry that prepares and cans milk (Ayalabe Dairy milk industry). Small-scale enterprises primarily process farm goods, however others employ other inputs such as coffee.

As of 2016, a significant number of Karatu residents are involved in trading, with over 2,000 trading entities in operation, ranging from retail and wholesale shops to hospitality industries such as kiosks, restaurants, and hotels; apartments, boarding houses, lodging, and guest houses, as well as liquors bars; transport business; banking; bookshops, stationeries, and printing; beauty salon and barber shops; professional consultancies; farm implements; butchers; pharmacies and mobile phones retailers.

=== Tourism ===
Endoro waterfalls, Lake Eyasi, Kambi ya simba Forest Reserve, Mount Oldeani, Mumba rock paintings, and Yaeda Valley for cultural tourism to see the Hadzabe and Datooga communities are some of the important attractions in Karatu district.

== Demographics ==
The largest ethnic population in the district is the Iraqw people, followed by the Datooga and the Hadza people. According to the 2022 Census, the Council has a population of 256,838 people, with 131,417 men and 125,422 women, and 48,345 homes. The District's birth rate is 3.1%. The average population density is 73.4 people per square kilometer, with lower densities (7-10 people per square kilometer) along Lake Eyasi and higher densities (100 people per square kilometer) in Karatu and Mbulumbulu Divisions.

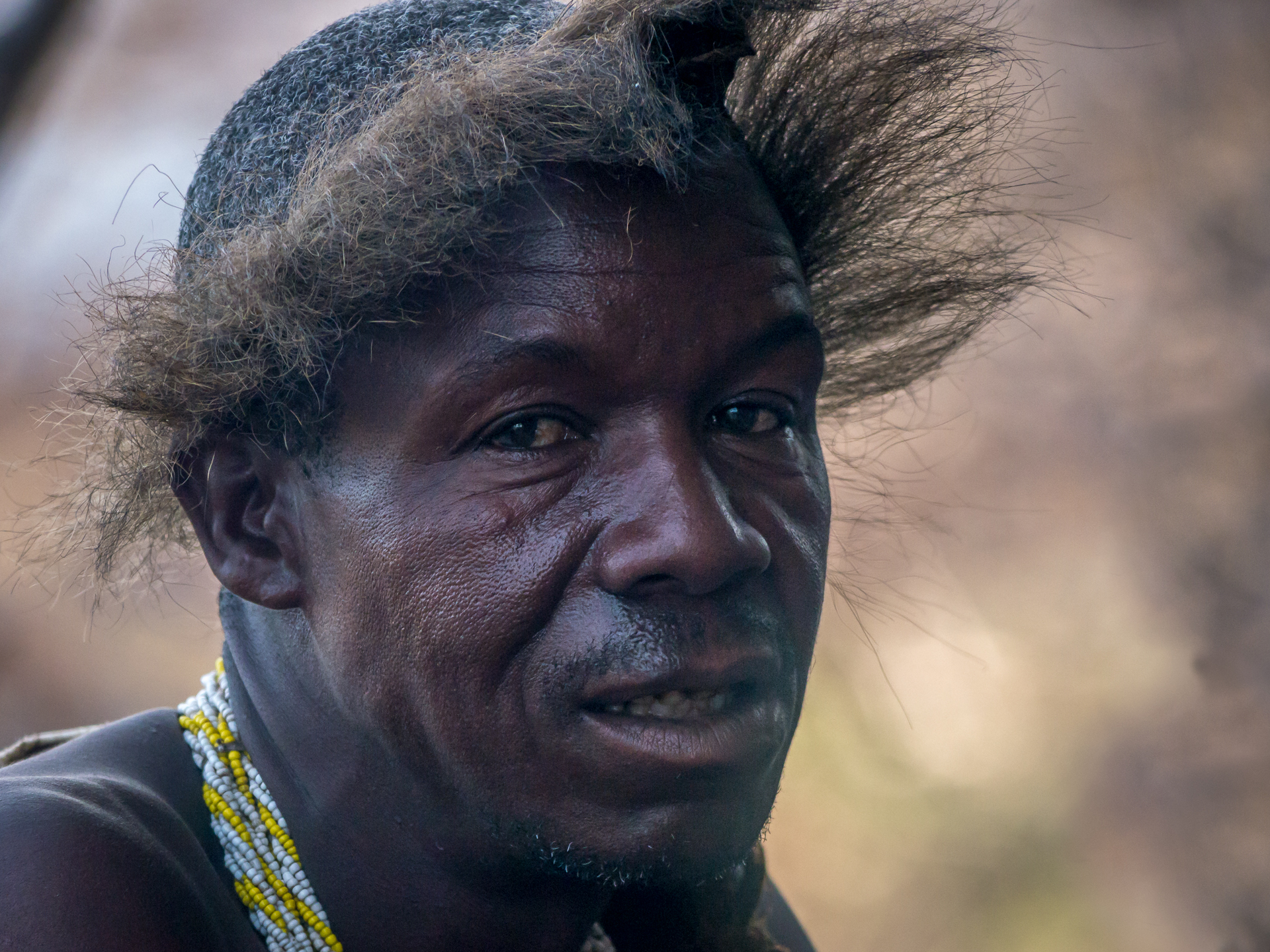
Portrait of Hadzabe Leader in Karatu's Baray Ward

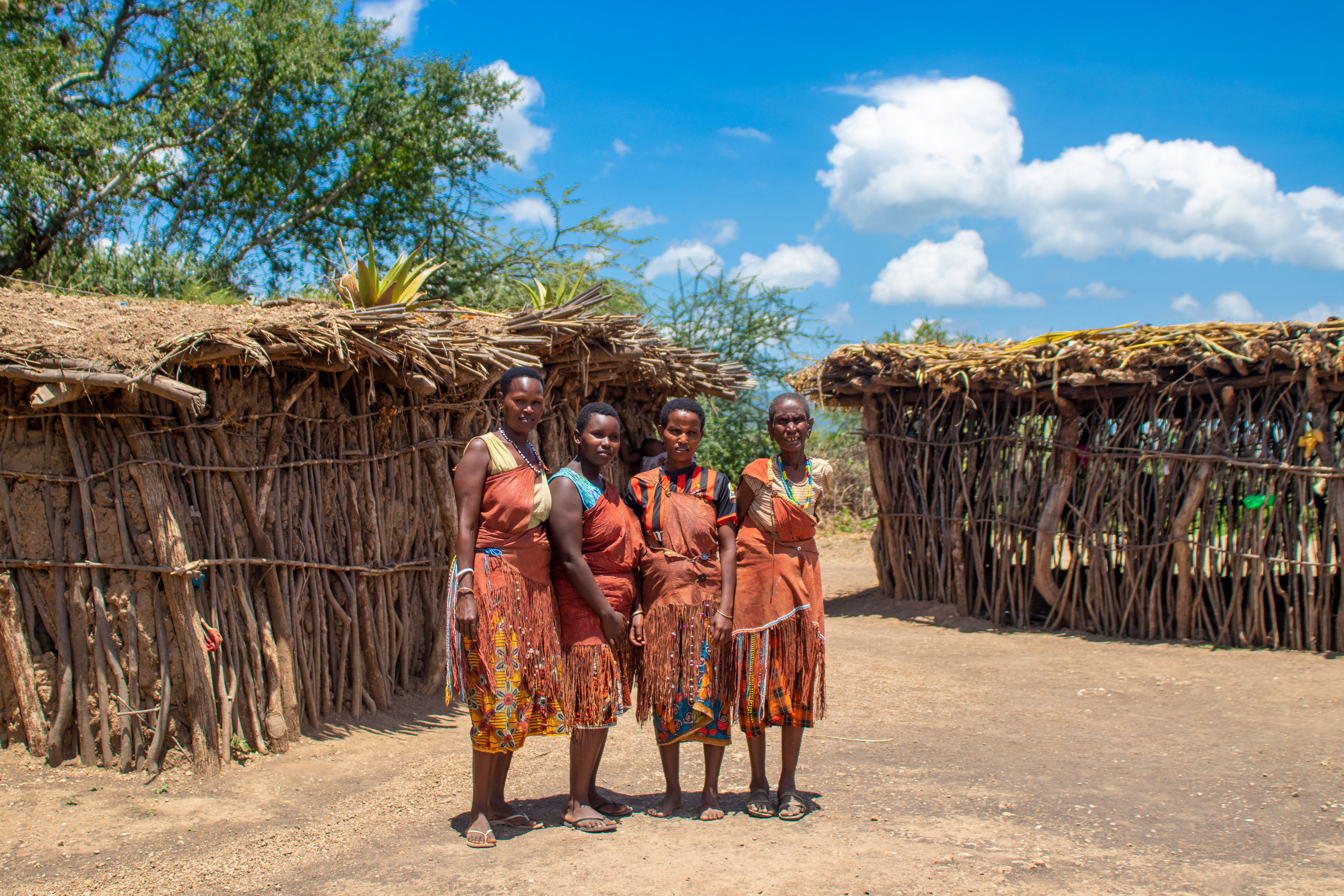
Datooga Family

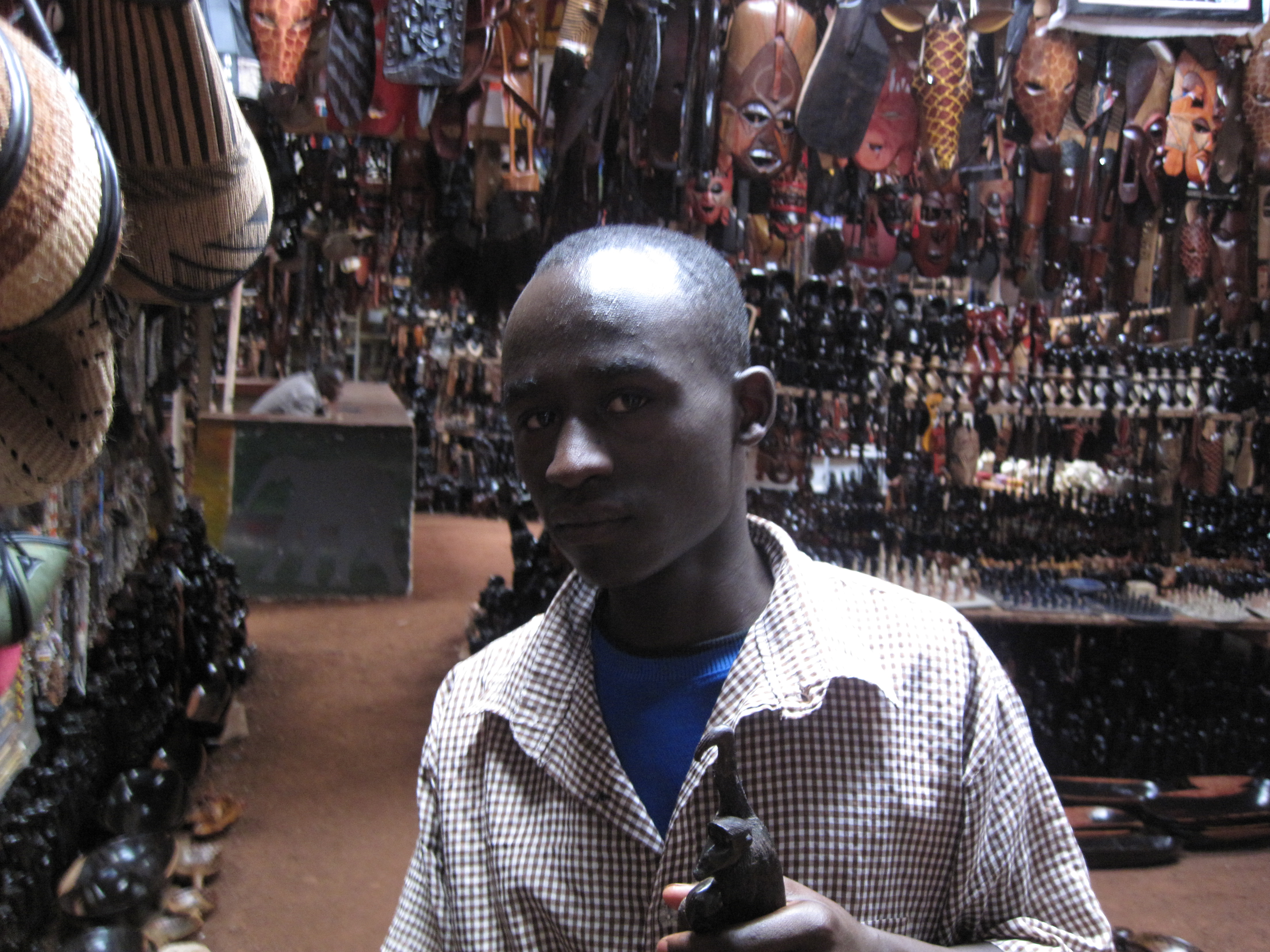
Iraqw man

== Administrative subdivisions ==
=== Wards ===
Karatu District is divided into four divisions, 14 wards, and 58 registered villages (Mbulumbulu, Eyasi, Karatu, and Endabash). As of 2012, Karatu District is administratively divided into 14 wards:

1. Baray
2. Buger
3. Daa
4. Endabash
5. Endamaghang
6. Endamarariek
7. Ganako

1. Kansay
2. Karatu
3. Mang'ola
4. Mbulumbulu
5. Oldeani
6. Qurus
7. Rhotia

== Notable people from Karatu District ==
- Saigilo, Datooga King
- Filbert Bayi, Tanzanian athlete
- Dr. Wilbrod Peter Slaa, A Lawyer, Prominent Opposition Leader and Theologian
- Prof. Mayo (University of Dar Es Salaam) Professor Of Civil Engineering
