= Baray, Arusha =

Ward in Karatu, Arusha, Tanzania

Baray
- Ward
- Kata ya Baray
- Location within Tanzania
- Coordinates: 03°44′39″S 36°07′12″E
- Country: Tanzania
- Region: Arusha Region
- District: Karatu District

Population (2012)
  - Total: 23,554

Baray is an administrative ward in the Karatu district of the Arusha Region of Tanzania. The ward is home to the Hadza. According to the 2012 census, the ward has a total population of 23,554.
