= Endamaghang =

Ward in Karatu, Arusha, Tanzania

- Ward
- Kata ya Endamaghang
- Location within Tanzania
- Coordinates: 03°22′31″S 35°20′11″E
- Country: Tanzania
- Region: Arusha Region
- District: Karatu District

Population (2012)
  - Total: 24,996

Endamaghang is an administrative ward in the Karatu District of the Arusha Region of Tanzania. According to the 2012 census, the ward has a total population of 24,996.
