= Kansay =

Ward in Karatu, Arusha, Tanzania

- Ward
- Kata ya Kansay
- Location within Tanzania
- Coordinates: 03°39′27″S 35°35′06″E
- Country: Tanzania
- Region: Arusha Region
- District: Karatu District

Population (2012)
  - Total: 14,198

Kansay is an administrative ward in the Karatu district of the Arusha Region of Tanzania. According to the 2012 census, the ward has a total population of 14,198.
