= Buger (Tanzanian ward) =

Ward in Karatu, Arusha, Tanzania

- Ward
- Kata ya Buger
- Location within Tanzania
- Coordinates: 03°39′31″S 36°38′17″E
- Country: Tanzania
- Region: Arusha Region
- District: Karatu District

Population (2012)
  - Total: 9,919

Buger is an administrative ward in the Karatu district of the Arusha Region of Tanzania. According to the 2012 census, the ward has a total population of 9,919.

Three quarters of Buger ward is a forest reserve.

The ward has three primary schools, one dispensary and one secondary school.

Buger Ward has a small airstrip for a small plane, which is near the secondary school.
