= Qurus =

Ward in Karatu, Arusha, Tanzania

- Ward
- Kata ya Qurus
- Location within Tanzania
- Coordinates: 03°25′58″S 35°36′28″E
- Country: Tanzania
- Region: Arusha Region
- District: Karatu District

Population (2012)
  - Total: 15,919

Qurus is an administrative ward in the Karatu district of the Arusha Region of Tanzania. According to the 2012 census, the ward has a total population of 15,919.

The Qurus ward is composed of 4 villages namely, Gongali, Bashay, Genda and Qurus

A grassroots antipoverty program was developed in Gongali Village.
