= Ambilocal residence =

Societal system of married couples residing with either spouse's parents

Ambilocal residence (or ambilocality), also called bilocal residence (bilocality) is the societal postmarital residence in which couples, upon marriage, choose to live with or near either spouse's parents. This is contrasted with matrilocality and patrilocality, where the newlyweds are expected to live with either the wife's parents or the husband's parents respectively, as well as neolocality, where the couple lives away from both sets of parents.

== Bibliography ==
- Fox, Robin (1967). Kinship and Marriage: An anthropological perspective. New York: Cambridge University Press. ISBN 0-521-27823-6.
- Korotayev, Andrey. 2001. An Apologia of George Peter Murdock. Division of Labor by Gender and Postmarital Residence in Cross-Cultural Perspective: A Reconsideration. World Cultures 12(2): 179-203.
