= Mbulu =

Town in Manyara Region, Tanzania

Mbulu Imboru
- Town
- Motto: Culture is Treasure
- Location within Tanzania
- Coordinates: 3°51′0″S 35°33′0″E
- Country: TanzaniaTanzania
- Region: Manyara Region
- District: Mbulu District
- Ward: Imboru
- Established: 1907
- Founder: German colonists

Government
  - District Chairperson: Zakaria Issaäy (CCM)

Population (2022 census)
  - Urban: 45,384
- Time zone: UTC+3 (East Africa Time)

Mbulu is a town in Tanzania and the capital of the Mbulu District. The town is inhabited by the Iraqw people. The Roman Catholic Diocese of Mbulu is also in Mbulu.

Mbulu is located in the Mbulu Highlands. The town, also known as Imboru among the Iraqw speakers, is the core of the Iraqw people, who speak a Cushitic language.

Mbulu was founded by Germans in 1907 when they colonized former German East Africa (Tanganyika, Burundi and Rwanda). Mbulu's climate favoured Germans, and the hospitality of the indigenous people favoured them. Germans were less harsh to the Iraqw people than to the rest of the Tanganyikans. Thus Iraqw were used by Germans on white-collar jobs. Today most Afro-German with Tanzanian ancestry are Iraqw from Mbulu. During the British regime, Mbulu peasants were able to form trade unions, particularly the Mbulu Wheat Growers association (1923).

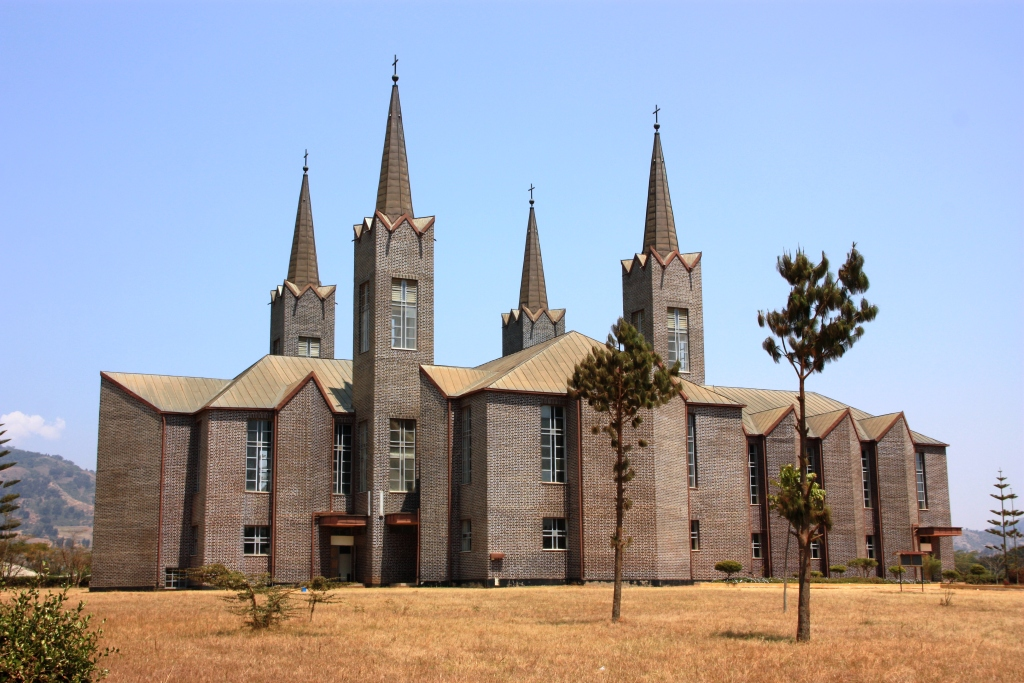
Catholic Church in Mbulu

The main economic activities in Mbulu are agriculture and trade. Mbulu area is one of the earliest wheat-growing plantations.
