= Endamarariek =

Ward in Karatu District, Arusha Region

Endamarariek Kata ya Endamarariek
- Ward
- Location within Tanzania
- Coordinates: 3.478760°S 35.70650°E
- Country: Tanzania
- Region: Arusha Region
- District: Karatu District
- Ward: Endamarariek

Population (2016)
  - Total: 27,893
- Time zone: UTC+3 (EAT)

Endamarariek is an administrative ward in the Karatu district of the Arusha Region of Tanzania. In 2016 the Tanzania National Bureau of Statistics report there were 27,893 people in the ward, from 24,996 in 2012.

The ward borders Lake Manyara National Park to the east.
