= Rhotia =

Ward in Karatu, Arusha, Tanzania

- Ward
- Kata ya Rhotia
- Location within Tanzania
- Coordinates: 03°18′36″S 35°44′00″E
- Country: Tanzania
- Region: Arusha Region
- District: Karatu District

Population (2012)
  - Total: 24,268

Rhotia is an administrative ward in the Karatu district of the Arusha Region of Tanzania. According to the 2012 census, the ward has a total population of 24,268. Rhotia is the second most populous ward in Karatu district.
