= Herman Pontzer =

American anthropologist

- Education: Penn State University (BA); Harvard University (MA, PhD)
- Known for: Human evolution
- Scientific career
- Fields: Biology; evolutionary anthropology
- Workplaces: Duke University

Herman Pontzer is an American evolutionary anthropologist at Duke University, where he is associate professor of evolutionary anthropology and global health. He is known for his research into human bioenergetics.

== Constrained daily energy expenditure model ==
In the context of the exercise paradox—where increased physical activity does not always lead to weight loss—Pontzer helped develop a theory of human metabolism known as the "constrained daily energy expenditure model". According to this theory, total daily energy expenditure is not simply the sum of separate metabolic processes (such as basal metabolism, movement, digestion, reproduction, and immune function). Instead, energy expenditure increases with activity only up to a certain point, after which it plateaus. This suggests that humans have evolved a biological constraint that limits the total amount of energy expended per day.

== Bibliography ==
=== Books ===
- Pontzer, Herman (2021). Burn: The Misunderstood Science of Metabolism. Penguin.
- — (2025). Adaptable: How Your Unique Body Really Works and Why Our Biology Unites Us. Random House.

=== Articles ===
- Pontzer, Herman (January 2023). "The Human Engine". Scientific American. 328 (1): 22–27. (Note: Online version is titled "New human metabolism research upends conventional wisdom about how we burn calories".)

———————

Bibliography notes
