= Oldeani =

Ward in Karatu, Arusha, Tanzania

- Ward
- Kata ya Oldeani
- Location within Tanzania
- Coordinates: 3°21′S 35°33′E
- Country: Tanzania
- Region: Arusha Region
- District: Karatu District

Population (2012)
  - Total: 6,870

Oldeani is an administrative ward in the Karatu district of the Arusha Region of Tanzania. According to the 2002 census, the ward has a total population of 6,870.
