= Mang'ola =

Ward in Karatu, Arusha, Tanzania

- Ward
- Kata ya Mang'ola
- Location within Tanzania
- Coordinates: 03°31′12″S 35°18′44″E
- Country: Tanzania
- Region: Arusha Region
- District: Karatu District

Population (2012)
  - Total: 6,087

Mang'ola is an administrative ward in the Karatu district of the Arusha Region of Tanzania. It is mainly known for its onion farms and for being the onion capital of Tanzania.

== Population ==
According to the 2012 census, the ward had a total population of 6,087.

== Geography ==
lies near the East African Plateau and the Great Rift Valley, approximately 51 km southwest of the town center of Karatu and about 150 km southwest of the city of Arusha.
