= Iraqw people =

Cushitic ethnic group from Arusha and Manyara Regions of Tanzania

Iraqw
Wa Iraqw
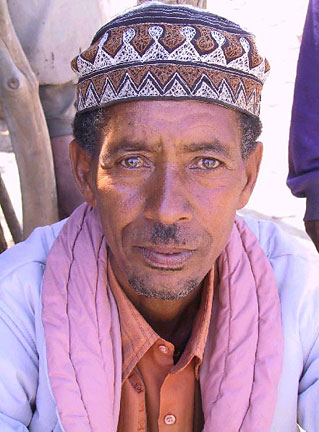
- An Iraqw man from Karatu District

Total population
- c. 603,000 (2009)

Regions with significant populations
- Tanzania

Languages
- Iraqw, Swahili, English

Religion
- Predominantly Christianity; minority Islam

Related ethnic groups
- Alagwa • Burunge • Gorowa • Rendille • Oromo and Other Cushitic people

The Iraqw or Iraqu (/ɪˈrɑːkuː/) are a Cushitic ethnic group inhabiting the northern Tanzanian regions. They dwell in southwestern Arusha and Manyara regions of Tanzania, near the Rift Valley. The Iraqw people then settled in the southeast of Ngorongoro Crater in northern Karatu District, Arusha Region, where the majority of them still reside. In the Manyara region, the Iraqw are a major ethnic group, specifically in Mbulu District, Babati District and Hanang District.

== History ==
Many Kenyan tribes and cultures recall a community, or more specifically, two closely associated ethnicities, which in part practiced Sirikwa culture. Among the Ameru inhabiting Mount Kenya today, they recall upon their ancestors' arrival, they met two peoples living in harmony, one, Kalenjin speaking hunter-gather cave-dwellers (probably the aboriginal Ogiek), and another, practicing Stone Bowl cultural complex. The latter, they called Lumbwa, Humba, and Humbua. The description of these two communities coincides with similar oral traditions for a group of communities that were referred to as Oropom, Jenqwel, Sirikwa, Sengwer, Sikker, among others.

Profoundly, among the Kalenjin and the Turkana, their word for Sirikwa culture-practicing community sound close in resemblance to the word Iraqw, such as Sirikwa among Kipsigis and Nandi. A remnant of the Sirikwa culture peoples is the Sengwer tribe of Kalenjin that inhabits Cherangany Hills. There's an association through the Sengwer people through their other eponym, Cherangany, to events that took place and resulted in their refuge in the hills; the Maasai accorded them the name Cherangany derogatively due to loss of wealth in cattle and territorial claim. They would also have been called Kwavi.

It is believed that upon displacement of Maliri people by Jie into offshoot Kalenjin tribes including Dasaanach of Ethiopia, Sebei of Uganda and Pokot of Kenya, interaction between the latter and Iraqw resulted in cultivating a seedbed of Kalenjin tribes such as Sengwer, Marakwet, Nandi, Kipsigis and Okiek/Ogiek in Lake Baringo. Borowed Somali words in Kalenjin, including the number system, demonstrate influence and interaction with a Cushitic culture that may have most likely resulted from their interaction.

=== Kerio Valley, Kenya ===
The Iraqw have traditionally been viewed as remnants of Afro-Asiatic peoples who practiced agriculture and animal husbandry in the Great Lakes region — a succession of societies collectively known as the Stone Bowl cultural complex. Most of these early northern migrants are believed to have been absorbed by later movements of Nilotic and Bantu peoples. In the Kerio Valley of Kenya, among other neighboring areas, there are vestiges of the Neolithic tillers' civilization in the form of elaborate irrigation systems. Although these particular structures are today maintained by the Marakwet subgroup of the Nandi Kalenjin Nilotes, the latter aver that they were the work of a northern people of peculiar language called the Sirikwa, who were later decimated by pestilence. According to the Marakwet, the Sirikwa "built the furrows, but they did not teach us how to build them; we only know how to keep them as they are." Iraqw oral tradition also refers Lake Manyara as "Tlawta Moyar tsar" meaning "Second Lake Moya." The legend says the first Lake Moya is far north probably Lake Turkana of western Moyale around Kenya-Ethiopia border.

=== Engaruka, Monduli District ===
Additionally, the Iraqw's ancestors are often credited with having constructed the sprawling Engaruka complex in Monduli District, Arusha Region, Tanzania. The modern Iraqw practice an intensive form of self-contained agriculture that bears a remarkable similarity to the ruins of stone-walled canals, dams and furrows that are found at Engaruka. Iraqw historical traditions likewise relate that their last significant migration to their present area of inhabitation occurred about two or three centuries ago after conflicts with the Barbaig sub-group of the Datog Nilotes, herders who are known to have occupied the Crater Highlands above Engaruka prior to the arrival of the Maasai. This population movement is reportedly consistent with the date of the Engaruka site's desertion, which is estimated at somewhere between 1700 and 1750. It also roughly coincides with the start of the diminishment of the Engaruka River's flow as well as those of other streams descending from the Ngorongoro highlands; water sources around which Engaruka's irrigation practices were centered.

According to the Maasai Nilotes, who are the present-day occupants of Engaruka, the Iraqw also already inhabited the site when their own ancestors first entered the region during the 18th century.

== Distribution ==
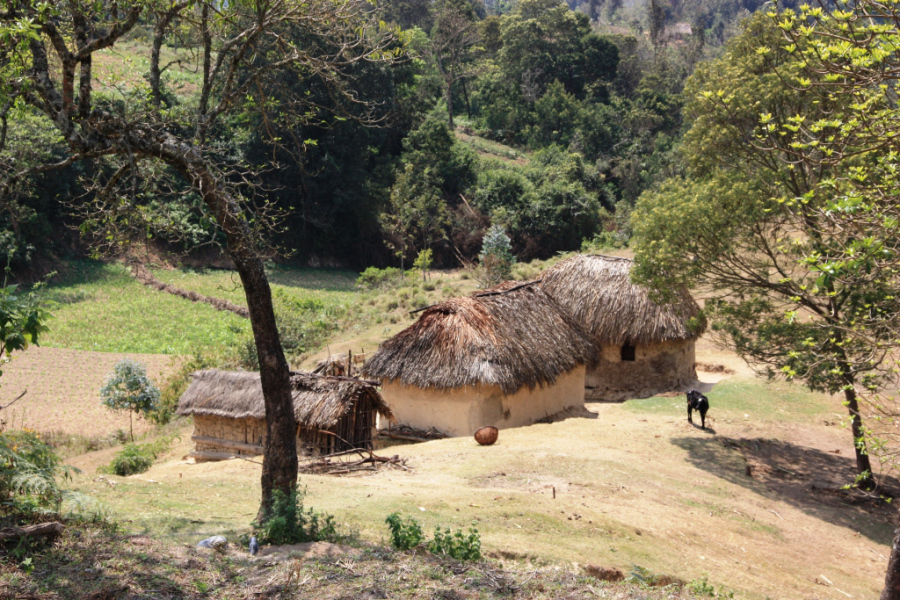
Iraqw homestead.

In 2001, the Iraqw population was estimated to number around 462,000 individuals. Current estimates suggest the population of Iraqw people to the region of 1,000,000.

Their core area of inhabitation is Iraqw’ar Da/aw (or Mama Issara) in the Mbulu Highlands in northern Manyara Region. It has long been known for its intensive cultivation, and referred to as an "island" within a matrix of less intensive cultivation.

The areas surrounding Karatu town in the Arusha region are also predominantly settled by the Iraqw.

== Culture ==
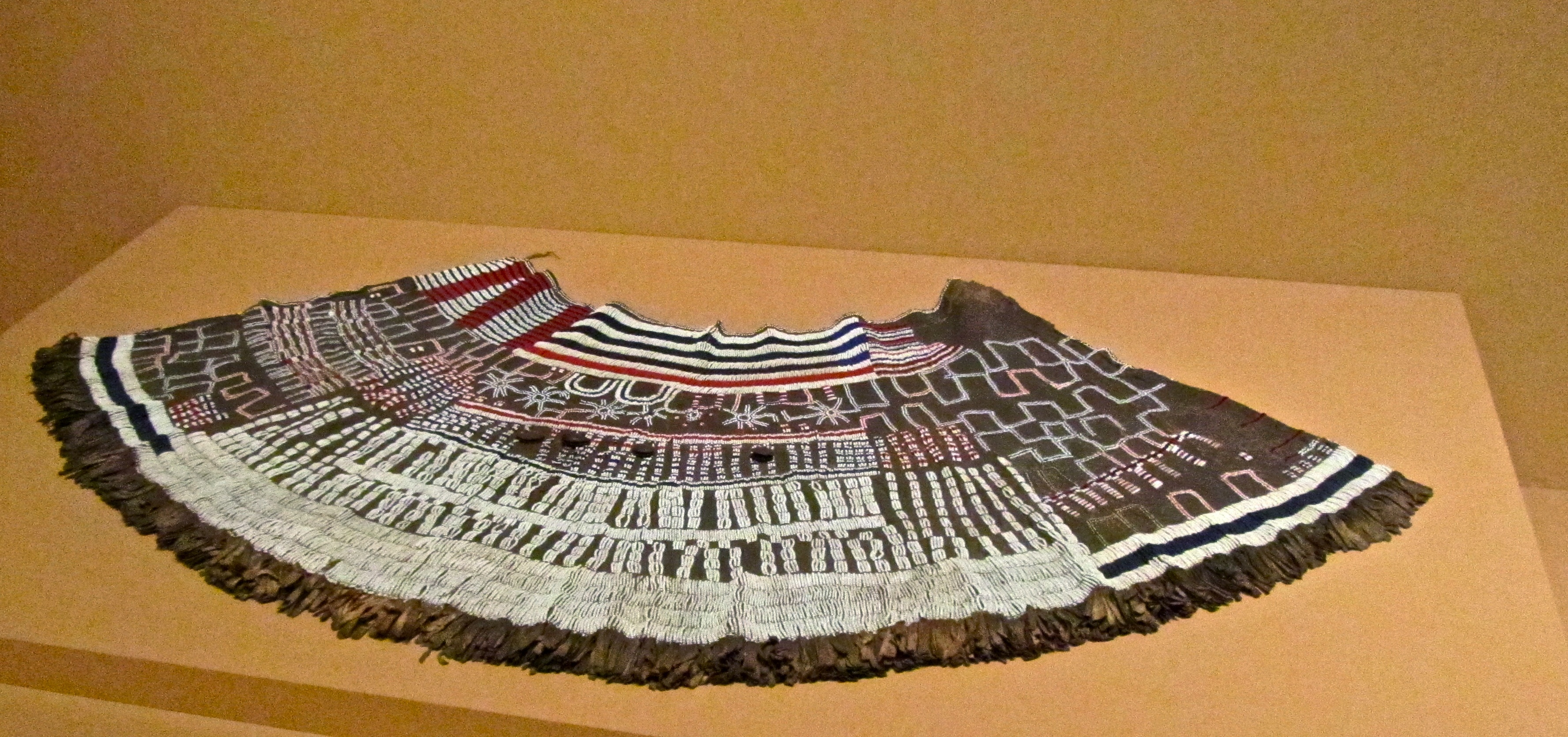
Leather skirt adorned with glass and metal beads

Comprehensive anthropological analyses of the ethnic Iraqw by Ikeda et al. (1982) suggests that they share significant affinities with other Cushitic-speaking populations generally. However, due to intermarriage with the surrounding Tanzanian populations, the Iraqw also have some morphological ties with local Bantu groups.

== Language ==
The Iraqw speak the Iraqw language, which belongs to the South Cushitic branch of the Afro-Asiatic family. Iraqw speakers also speak Swahili, the national language of Tanzania.

== Genetics ==
Recent advances in genetic analyses have helped shed some light on the ethnogenesis of the Iraqw people. Genetic genealogy, although a novel tool that uses the genes of modern populations to trace their ethnic and geographic origins, has also helped clarify the possible background of the modern Iraqw.

=== Y DNA ===
A Y-chromosome study by Wood et al. (2005) tested various populations in Africa for paternal lineages, including 9 Iraqw males from Tanzania. The authors observed the E1b1b haplogroup in 56% of the studied Iraqw, which is typical of Afro-Asiatic males from North and Northeast Africa, who possess the haplogroup at high frequencies. The second most frequent paternal lineage among the Iraqw was Haplogroup B, which is commonly found in Nilotic populations; it was observed in 22% of Iraqw males. The third most frequently observed paternal DNA marker in the Iraqw was the E1b1a haplogroup (E-P1), which is now very common among Bantus; it was found in 11% of the Iraqw samples. In a larger sample, haplogroup T y-DNA was found in 11% of Iraqw.

=== Autosomal DNA ===
The Iraqw's autosomal DNA has been examined in a comprehensive study by Tishkoff et al. (2009) on the genetic affiliations of various populations in Africa. According to Bayesian clustering analysis, the Iraqw generally grouped with other Afroasiatic-speaking populations inhabiting the Great Lakes region, with these lacustrine groups forming a cluster distinct from that of the Afroasiatic-speaking populations in the Horn of Africa, North Africa and the Sahara. This difference was attributed to marked genetic exchanges between the Iraqw and neighboring Nilo-Saharan and Bantu communities over the past 5,000 or so years.

== Notable Iraqw ==
=== Politicians ===
- Willibrod Slaa - Politician and Diplomat
- Mary Nagu - Former Minister and Member of the parliament
- Philip Marmo - Former Ambassador of Tanzania to China
- Maxmillian Matle Iranqhe Former international Athletic and Mayor of Arusha City

=== Statespeople ===
- Frederick Sumaye, Former Prime Minister of Tanzania

=== Sportsmen and entertainment ===
- Filbert Bayi
- John Stephen Akhwari
- Gabriel Gerald Geay
- Vanessa Mdee

=== Religious People ===
- Wolfgang Pisa - President of the Catholic's Tanzania Episcopal Conference
- Saigilo - Iraqw Folk Religion's Prophet
