= Njombe District =

Coordinates: 9.250°S 35.000°E

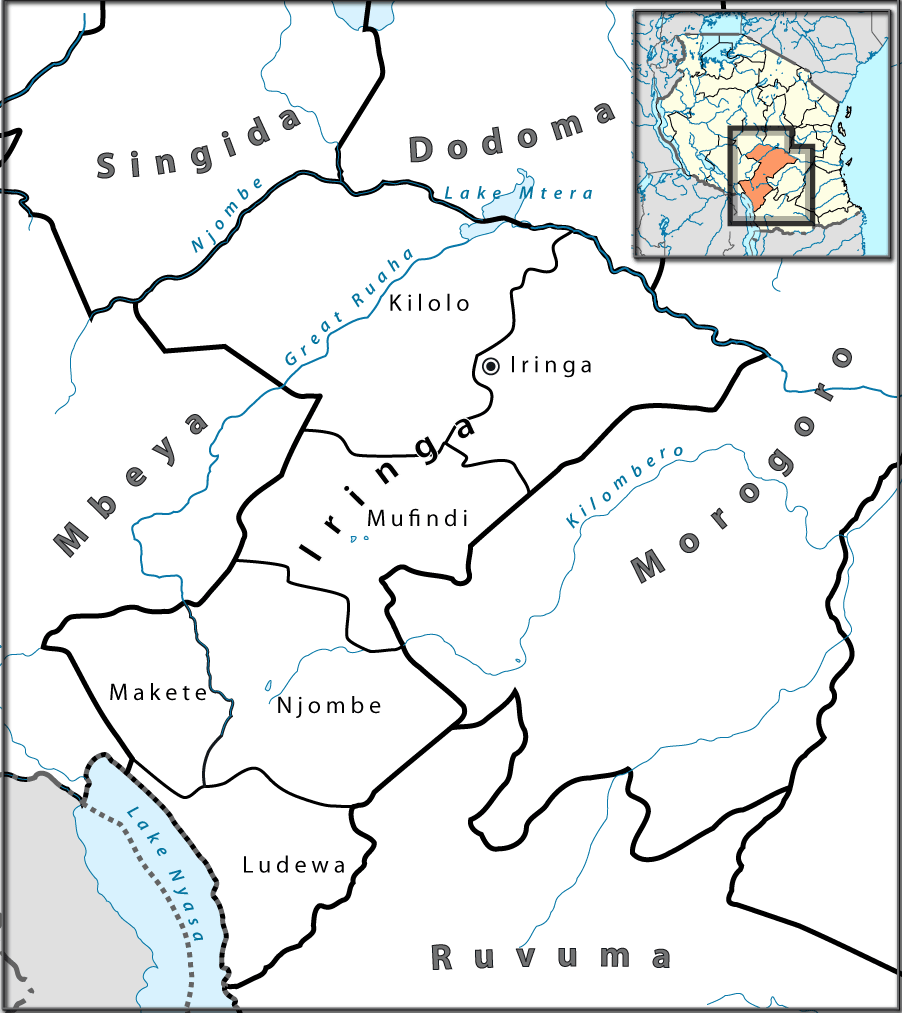
Old Njombe District in Iringa Region

Njombe District is a former district of the Iringa Region of Tanzania. The current Njombe districts are Njombe Rural District and Njombe Urban District.

Up until 2012 Njombe District was among the districts of the Iringa Region. In 2012, the area that had been within the old Njombe District was incorporated into the new Njombe Region. Within the new region there were created three districts that had wards that were formerly within Njombe District: Njombe Rural District, Njombe Urban District (Njombe Town Council) and Wanging'ombe District. In addition Njombe Region received Makete District and Ludewa District from Iringa Region.

== Etymology ==
The name Njombe originates from a name of a tree species "Mdzombe" that was by then dominant in the place called Mdandu which was a German "Boma" during German colonialism, this tree species has a medicinal value.

== Population ==
According to the 2002 Tanzania National Census, the population of the Njombe District was 420,348. A large population belong to the Christian religion and little Muslims and some Local Religion.

== Economic Activities ==
The main economic activities of the people of Njombe include cultivation of food crops. Njombe was one of the largest producers of Irish Potatoes, Maize and partly beans.

As for cash crops, timber and electric poles are produced at large amounts. It has come up of recent that a large population has embarked onto planting trees for timber. The common tree species grown here include Pines at a very large percent and a little of Eucalyptus and Cypress.

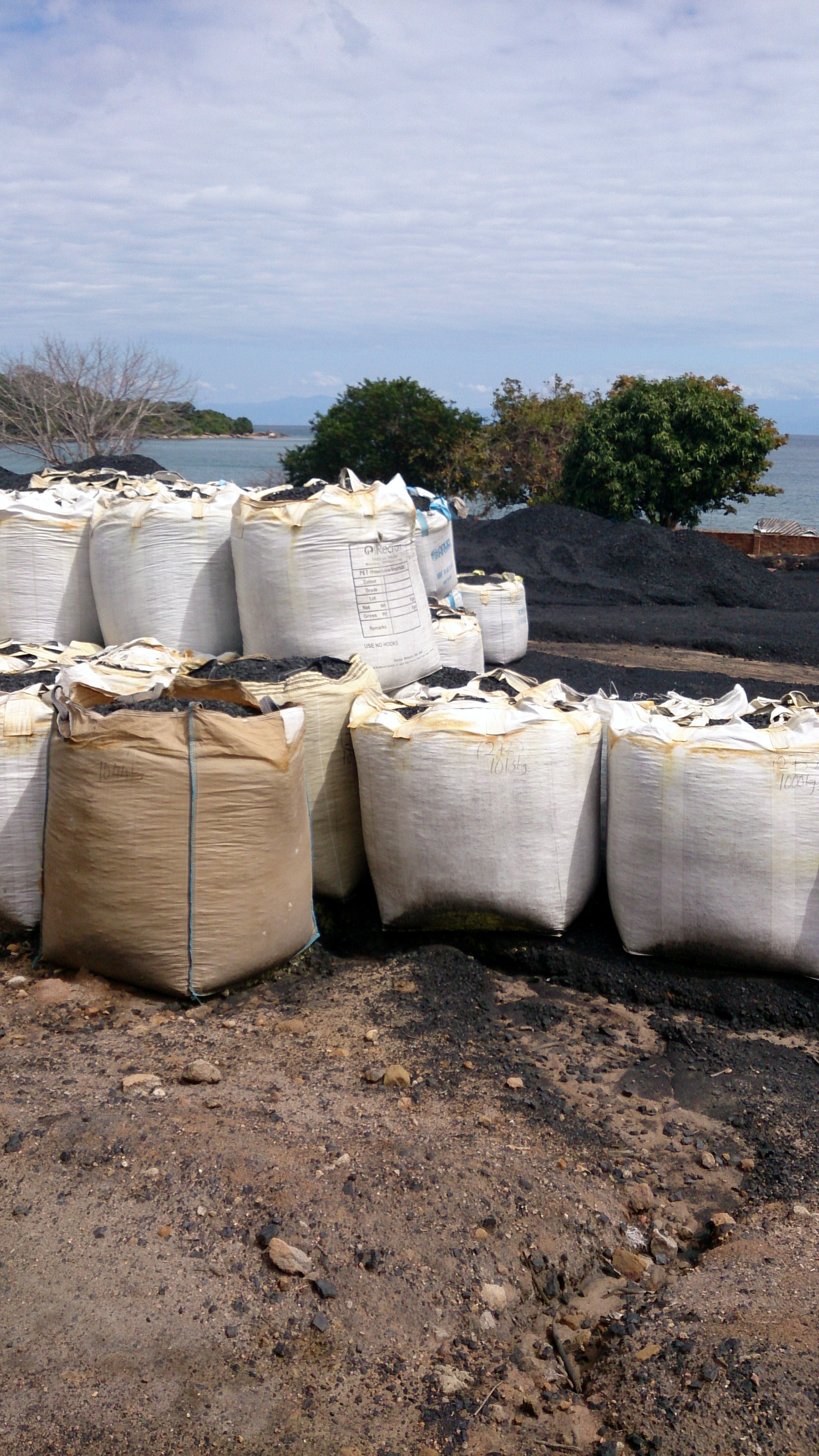
Coal mining in Ludew District near Lake Nyassa

Timber is sold directly to Dar es Salaam where there is the larger market and the other is locally sold for carpentry, building and construction activities.

== Wards ==
As of 2002, Njombe District was administratively divided into twenty-five wards:

1. Idamba
2. Igongolo
3. Igosi
4. Ikondo
5. Ikuna
6. Ilembula
7. Imalinyi
8. Iwungilo
9. Kidegembye
10. Kifanya
11. Luduga
12. Lupembe
13. Luponde
14. Mahongole
15. Makambako
16. Matola
17. Mdandu
18. Mtwango
19. Njombe Mjini
20. Saja
21. Usuka
22. Uwemba
23. Wangama
24. Wanging'ombe
25. Yakobi

== Sources ==
1. Njombe District Homepage for the 2002 Tanzania National Census
