= Njombe Rural District =

- District
- location in Njombe Region
- Coordinates: 08°51′S 034°50′E
- Country: Tanzania
- Region: Njombe Region

Population (2022 census)
  - Total: 182,127

Njombe Rural District is one of the six districts of the Njombe Region of Tanzania, East Africa. Its administrative seat is Njombe town. The 2022 population was 182,127.

== History ==
Njombe Rural District was formally established when it was gazetted in March 2012. It was created out of the northern part of the old Njombe District that had been in Iringa Region. Western Njombe District became Wanging'ombe District, and south-eastern part became Njombe Urban District.

== Economy ==
Most people are employed in herding and subsistence farming.

Roads are poor.

== Administrative subdivisions ==
=== Constituencies ===
For parliamentary elections, Tanzania is divided into constituencies. As of the 2010 elections the area that became Njombe Rural District had one constituency:

- Njombe Kaskazini (Njombe North) Constituency

=== Divisions ===
Njombe Rural District is administratively divided into divisions.

=== Wards ===
As of 2012, Njombe Rural District was administratively divided into fourteen wards:

- Idamba
- Igongolo
- Ikondo
- Ikuna
- Kidegembye
- Kitandililo
- Lupembe
- Mahongole
- Mfriga
- Matembwe
- Matola
- Mtwango
- Ninga
- Utengule
