= Makambako =

- Town and district
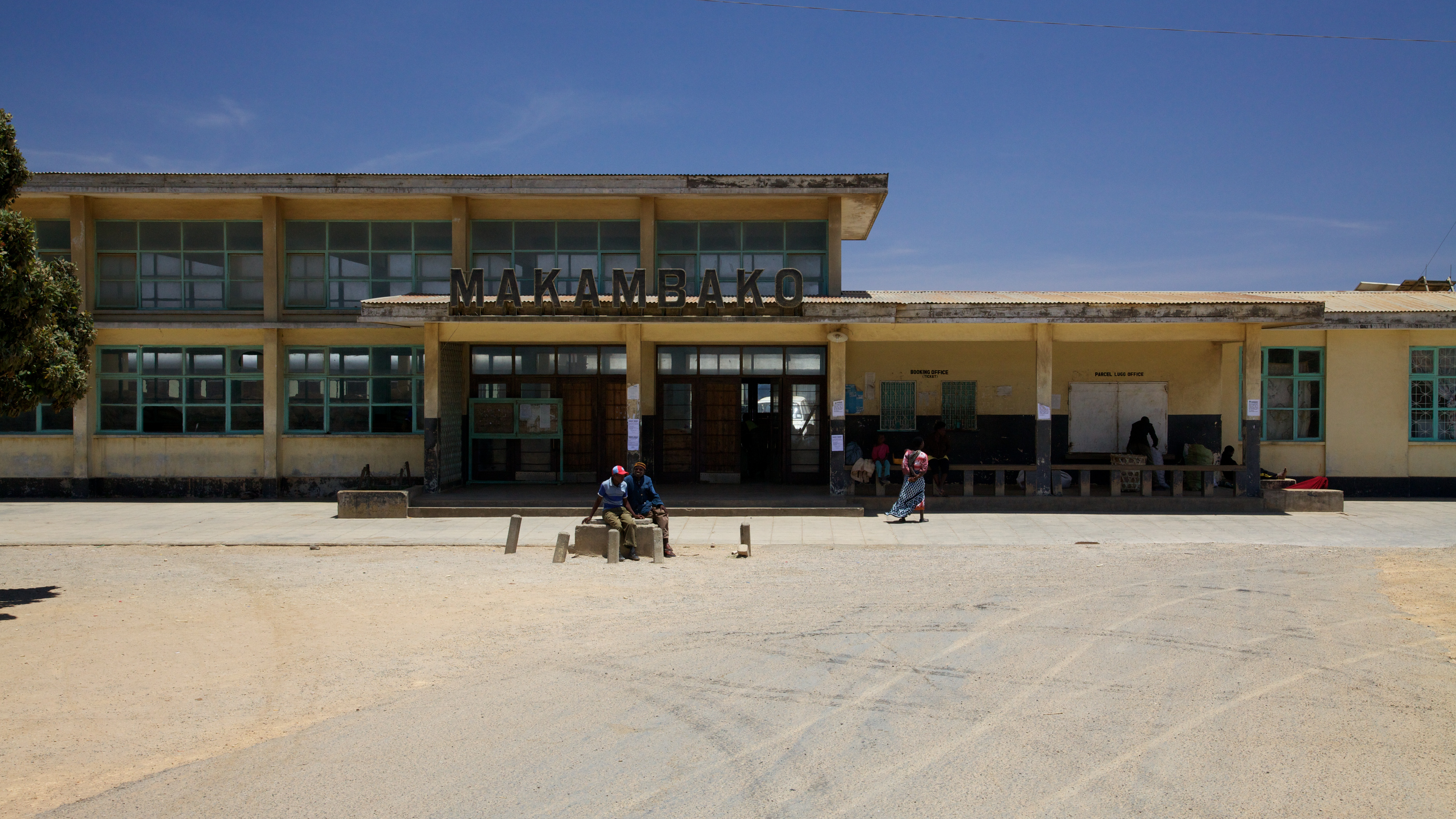
- The Makambako Rail station.

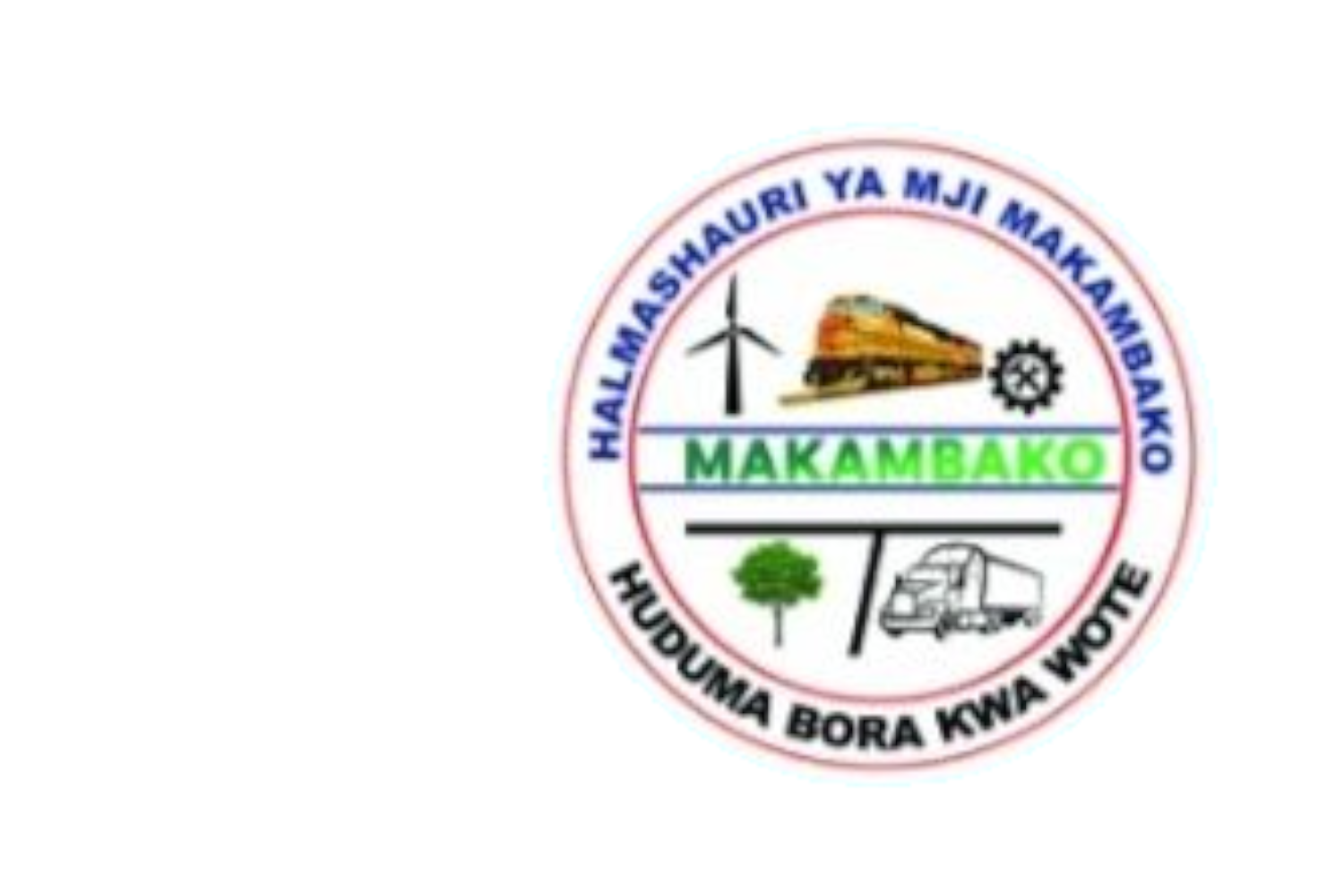
- Flag

- location in Njombe Region
- Coordinates: 8°51′S 34°50′E
- Country: Tanzania
- Region: Njombe Region
- District: Makambako Urban District

Area
  - Town and district: 341.1 sq mi (883.4 km^{2})

Population (2022 census)
  - Town and district: 146,481
  - Density: 429.5/sq mi (165.8/km^{2})
  - Urban: 116,232
- Time zone: UTC+3 (EAT)
- Website: www.makambakotc.go.tz

Makambako is a medium-sized town and district in the Njombe Region of the Tanzanian Southern Highlands, located roughly 40 miles north of Njombe city by road. It is located at junction of the A104 and B4 roads between Njombe, Iringa, and Mbeya. Its population according to the 2002 Tanzanian census was 51,049.

== Etymology ==
The name of the town come from "Makhambako" (singular Likhambako), a Bena word for bulls. This was the name of the forest which had large tree called Likhambako. Bena residing in this area performed religious rituals at that tree leading to the whole forest being referred to as Makhambako. There are few trees found in Miti ya Makhambako Street in Ubena Ward, which are protected for history of the name of the town.

== History ==
Makambako was visited by Paul Theroux who in his book Dark Star Safari: Overland from Cairo to Cape Town described it not as a town but "a collection of hovels on stretch of paved road where idle people sat or stood."

The town of Makambako has seen fast development. As a result, the northwest Wabena are advocating for Makambako to become its own district.

Makambako's rapid development owes to being the location where Songea Road branches off Tanzania Zambia Road (TANZAM), Presence of Tanzania Zambia Railway Authority (TAZARA)'s railway station. Presence of TAZARA railway station lead to establishment of police station, TAZARA workers quarters, development of TAZARA water intake at Bwawani which is now being developed by the government. Presence of Tanzania People Defence Force (TPDF) Legion. All these led to the influx of workers from different parts of Tanzania as a well as people from nearby villages to trade in the area. These development led to development of market, modern and local bars etc making it the business centre.

== Geography ==
Makambako is now a town, located in the Southern Highlands of Tanzania, approximately 60 kilometers north of the district capital of Njombe. The town of Makambako contains the settlements of Ikwete, Maguvani, Ubena, Kipagamo, Idofi, Mlowa, Mkolango, Lyamkena, Kiumba, Mwembetogwa, Mjimwema, Kitisi, Kivavi and Kilimahewa.

The Makambako Plateau is one of three agroecological zones in the Njombe District, the other two being the Eastern Highlands and the Njombe Plateau.

Maize is commonly grown in the plateau while Makambako is notable for tomato cultivation and trade.

== Culture ==
=== Ethnic groups ===
The largest ethnic group in Makambako town are the Bena. Their living arrangements include large, polygamous, extended families and on average, there are more than five children in a household. Farming responsibility is left to women with almost all of them following an occupation. Female headed households are more dependent on subsistence food, operating as "street vendors" or with mobile fast-food kitchens.

Other group of people includes Kinga from Makete district who famous in trading activities. Pangwa from Ludewa District and Hehe are from nearby Iringa Region.

There is also a significant number of people from other regions who came to work as Soldiers, Police officers and Railway workers who have established permanent settlement in the town.

=== Language ===
Kiswahili is widely spoken just as other urban areas of Tanzania.

The native tribe of this area are Bena who are at adjacent to the Iringa Region where Hehe is spoken hence many residents speak Kisovi a variation of Kibena which some vocabulary and pronunciation resemble that of Hehe counterparts

== Education ==
There are several educational institutions in Makambako including primary schools, secondary schools and one university. Some of these include primary schools like Azimio Primary School, Makambako primary School, Maendeleo primary school, Uhuru primary school, Umoja primary school, also secondary schools like Makambako secondary school, Lyamkena secondary school, Maguvani secondary school, Kipagamo secondary school, Naboti secondary school, genesis secondary school, Mcf-Makambako Girls Secondary School, Ngogo secondary school, Mukilima secondary school. Also there is one university named St. Joseph University of Tanzania.

== Health services ==
Governmental Health Institutions

Makambako Town Hospital which is located in Ubena District which is within the Town CBD.

Makambako District hospital: There is the ongoing construction of the new Makambako District hospital in Mlowa Ward.

Lyamkena Dispensary where during COVID-19 Outbreak there was quarantine facilities provided there though no patient was reported

Religious Health Institutions

Saint Joseph Hospital Ikelu: This is found in Ikelu, Iliunda, Makambako Town along the Dar es Salaam - Songea Road. The hospital is in the level of District Hospitals.

RC Mission Dispensary which is located at Bwawani, Mjimwema Ward in Makambako Town and the Kitanewa Dispensary in the town of Kitanewa. The Makambako Parish is run by the Benedictine Sisters, Congregation of Saint Agnes, Saint Bikira Maria wa Huruma. Under the Archdiocese of Songea.

== Transportation ==
=== Road ===
The 322 kilometres road between Songea and Makambako was funded by the ADB and was built between 1980 and 1985. There is a regular quick bus service. The trunk road between Tanzania and Zambia (Tan-Zam Road), founded by The World Bank and completed in 1973, goes through the district.

=== Railway ===
Makambako lies along the TAZARA Railway. The bridge section of the railway in Makambako was said to have been completed in early 1973.

== Public works ==
Makambako is a major centre for rural planning in the region and contains a Rural Service Centre, where thousands of plots have been surveyed and allocated to developers. Councillors based in Makambako are also responsible for the facilitation and planning of other works in the area.

Makambako was connected by electricity in 1981, however, high installation costs has meant that by 1992, only 2% used electricity for cooking and only 22% had it installed. The Italian organization, ABB-SAE Sadelmi has erected high-tension power lines and worked on the rehabilitation of the National Grid between Makambako and Mbeya.

In 1992, a piped water supply project received financial and technical assistance from UNICEF, but even after completion, it was considered inadequate, requiring continued potable water dependency on boreholes, dams and streams. Facing an acute problem of water, the Makambako Shallow Wells Project is expected to ease water woes. Organized under the auspices of the GEF/Small Grants Programme, the project started in September 2008 and is expected to be completed in December 2010. Ubena Cultural Reforms Association is the Grantee of the US$36,799 grant.
