= Nyumbanitu =

Nyumbanitu is a forest near the village of Mlevela, [Mdandu] ward in Wanging'ombe District of Tanzania's Njombe Region. It is at a distance of 15 km (9.3 mi) from Njombe.

It is notable as one of only three habitats for the rare Udzungwa forest partridge (Xenoperdix udzungwensis) and important site for the mythology for the local Bena people.

The caves inside the forest served as a hiding places during wars between the local Bena and their Hehe neighbours during the 19th century and also during the Maji Maji Rebellion in 1905–1906.

It has been used for worship and sacrifice by traditionalists.

A number of legends are connected to the forest.

== Footnotes ==
- Msitu wa Nyumbanitu wenye simulizi za Maajabu, Tumaini Msowoya in Mwananchi newspaper, 29 August 2016, lookup April 2018
- Xenoperdix udzungwensis, IUCN redlist, lookup April 2018]
- Stanley Elias, Inside Nyumbanitu: Reinterpretation of forest embedded folklores of Wabena in Njombe; published in: Journal of humanities and cultures studies, Vol.3, No.1, 22 January 2018 (NYUMBANITU TRADITIONAL FOREST REINTERPRETATION OF FOREST EMBEDDED FOLKLORES OF WABENA IN NJOMBE)
