= Njombe Urban District =

- District
- location in Njombe Region
- Coordinates: 09°20′S 034°46′E
- Country: Tanzania
- Region: Njombe Region

Population (2022 census)
  - Total: 109,311
- Website: www.tanzania.go.tz

Njombe Urban District is one of the six districts of the Njombe Region of Tanzania, East Africa. The administrative seat for the district is in the city of Njombe.

== History ==
Njombe Urban District was formally established when it was gazetted in March 2012. It was created out of the south-eastern part of the old Njombe District that had been in Iringa Region. Western Njombe District became Wanging'ombe District, and the northern part became Njombe Rural District.

== Economy ==
Outside of the 109,311 people city of Njombe, most people are employed in herding and subsistence farming.

=== Challenges facing the economy ===
Roads are poor and is not proper in heavy vehicle/truck.

== Administrative subdivisions ==
=== Constituencies ===
For parliamentary elections, Tanzania is divided into constituencies. As of the 2010 elections the area that became Njombe Urban District had one constituency:

- Njombe Kusini (Njombe South) Constituency

=== Divisions ===
Njombe Urban District is administratively divided into divisions.

=== Wards ===
As of 2012, Njombe Urban District was administratively divided into fourteen wards:

- Ihanga
- Iwungilo
- Kifanya
- Lugenge
- Luponde
- Lyamkena
- Matola
- Mji Mwema
- Mjimwema (A & B)
- Mlowa
- Mwembetogwa
- Njombe Mjini
- Ramadhani
- Ubena
- Utalingolo
- Uwemba
- Yakobi
