= Ruhudji Hydroelectric Power Station =

Power station in Tanzania

- Map of Tanzania showing the location of Ruhudji HPP. Ruhudji Hydroelectric Power Station (Africa) Ruhudji Hydroelectric Power Station (Earth)
- Country: Tanzania
- Location: Njombe District, Njombe Region
- Coordinates: 09°31′28″S 35°22′43″E
- Purpose: Power
- Status: Proposed
- Opening date: 2028 Expected
- Owner: Government of Tanzania
- Operator: TANESCO

Dam and spillways
- Impounds: Ruhudji River

Power Station
- Installed capacity: 358 megawatts (480,000 hp)
- Annual generation: 2,000 GWh

Ruhudji Hydroelectric Power Station is a planned 358 megawatts hydroelectric power station in Tanzania. The lead developer of this renewable energy project is Tanzania Electric Supply Company Limited (TANESCO), the government-owned electricity utility company. TANESCO plans to develop the power station, as a public private partnership (PPP) project. Work is contemporaneously ongoing, along with the development of the 222 megawatts Rumakali Hydroelectric Power Station, also located in Njombe Region.

== Location ==
The power station is located across the Ruhudji River, about 75 kilometres (47 mi), southeast of the town of Njombe, in the Njombe District of the Njombe Region, in southwestern Tanzania. This is about 760 kilometres (472 mi), southwest of Dar es Salaam, the largest city in Tanzania.

== Overview ==
The contract for a feasibility study and preparation of tender documents, worth US $6 million, was awarded to a consortium comprising the engineering firms Multiconsult of Norway, as the lead, Norplan Tanzania Limited and Tanzania Photomap Limited, as sub-contractors. Work includes feasibility studies for the two proposed hydropower dams and power stations, preparation of conceptual design and tender documents, and conduct of environmental and social impact assessment studies for the two power stations and associated evacuation transmission lines.

The design calls for an earth and rockfill dam, measuring 70 metres (230 ft) in height and 810 metres (2,657 ft) in length, forming a reservoir capable of holding 269,000,000 cubic meters (2.69×10^{11} L) of water.

== See also ==
- List of power stations in Tanzania
- Njombe Region
- Njombe District
