= Rumakali Hydroelectric Power Station =

Power station in Tanzania

- Map of Tanzania showing the location of Rumakali HPP. Rumakali Hydroelectric Power Station (Africa) Rumakali Hydroelectric Power Station (Earth)
- Country: Tanzania
- Location: Njombe District, Njombe Region
- Coordinates: 09°10′59″S 34°07′45″E
- Purpose: Power
- Status: Under construction
- Opening date: 2025 Expected
- Construction cost: US$553 million
- Owner: Tanesco–China Gezhouba Group Consortium
- Operator: TANESCO

Dam and spillways
- Type of dam: Earth and rockfill dam
- Impounds: Rumakali River

Power Station
- Turbines: 3 x 74 MW
- Installed capacity: 222 megawatts (298,000 hp)
- Annual generation: 2,450 GWh

Rumakali Hydroelectric Power Station is a 222 megawatts hydroelectric power station under construction in Tanzania. The power station is under development by a consortium comprising Tanzania Electric Supply Company Limited (TANESCO), the government-owned electricity utility company and the China Gezhouba Group. The power generated at this power station will be sold to TANESCO, for integration into the national electric grid.

== Location ==
The power station is located across the Rumakali River, northwest of the town of Njombe, in the Njombe District of the Njombe Region, in southwestern Tanzania. This is about 116 kilometres (72 mi), northwest of Njombe, the nearest large town.

== Overview ==
In 2020, a consortium consisting of the engineering firms Multiconsult of Norway, Norplan Tanzania Limited and Tanzania Photomap Limited, was awarded the contract, worth over US$6 million, for a feasibility study and preparation of tender documents. Multiconsult was the lead, with the other two being sub-contractors. Work included feasibility studies for the two dams, the 338 MW Ruhudji Hydroelectric Power Station and the 222 MW Rumakali Hydroelectric Power Station. Other tasks included in the contracts involves preparation of conceptual design and tender documents, and conduct of environmental and social impact assessment studies for the two power stations and associated evacuation transmission power lines.

The design calls for the following developments, among others: (a) construction of a powerhouse (b) construction of a substation (c) installation of three turbines, each rated at 74 MW (d) laying of transmission lines from the power station to Iganjo in Mbeya Region, about 89 kilometres (55 mi) away.

== Construction costs ==
The most recent cos estimates are reported at US$553 million, inclusive of the high voltage transmission line to carry the energy to a substation where it will be integrated into the national grid.

== Other considerations ==
In 2011, TANESCO had agreed for a Russian company, Zarubezhstroy Corporation, to build this power station at a price of US$700 million, over a five-year period. However those plans did not materialize.

== See also ==
- List of power stations in Tanzania
- Njombe Region
- Njombe District
