= Lugarawa =

Village in Njombe Region, Tanzania

Lugarawa Lugalawa (Swahili)
- Village of Lugarawa
- Location within Tanzania
- Coordinates: 9.82772°S 34.78017°E
- Country: Tanzania
- Region: Njombe Region
- District: Ludewa District
- Ward: Lugarawa Ward

Population (2022)
  - Total: 9,687
- Time zone: UTC+3 (EAT)

Lugarawa is a village of Ludewa District in Njombe Region, in the southern highlands of Tanzania. The zip code is 59418. The village is located a few kilometers off the main road from Njombe to Ludewa.

In the 2022 census, the population of the ward was counted as 9,687. At the time of the 2012 census, the ward had about 8,535 residents.

== Lugarawa Hydropower Plant ==
Lugarawa was the headquarters for the ACRA development project to build the 1.7 MW Lugarawa hydropower plant. The project lasted from 2010 to 2019, and was mainly funded (about 75%) by the European Commission under the EuropeAid program. The name of the project was "Hydroelectric energy for 20 isolated rural villages in the Ludewa District – Tanzania".

The hydropower plant provides electricity to approximately 51,000 inhabitants who live in Lugarawa and the 20 surrounding villages.

== Lugarawa Days Festival ==
The Lugarawa Days Festival was a cultural festival first held in 2015 by Lugarawa Development Foundation and Stikado. The festival was arranged during Nane Nane Day and was created to raise awareness about important community issues, through cultural, educational and sporting activities.

== St John’s Hospital Lugarawa ==
The St. John's Hospital in Lugarawa, operated by the Diocese of Njombe, is the most important point of contact for medical matters for the entire region with around 75,000 residents within a radius of up to 100 kilometers.
