= Hadow =

Hadow is a Scottish surname. A number of notable people have this name:

- Lieutenant-Colonel Arthur Lovell Hadow (1877–1968) who was commanding the Royal Newfoundland Regiment on the day of its destruction on the first day of the Battle of the Somme
- Colonel Arthur De Salis Hadow (1858–1915) was commander of the 10th battalion of the Yorkshire Regiment and was killed in the Battle of Loos.
- Charles Scott Hadow (1801–1849) co-owner of Willis, Hadow and Co, wine merchants of Scot's Yard, Bush lane, London and trader in India.
- Douglas Robert Hadow (1846–1865) who died during the descent after the first ascent of the Matterhorn
- Edward Ash Hadow, (1831–1866) chemist who conducted pioneering research on cyanide.
- Major-General Frederick Edward Hadow (1836–1915) served during the Indian Mutiny, in the Madras Artillery, later became a Justice of the Peace in Hereford.
- Professor George Hadow (1712–1780) professor of Hebrew and oriental languages at St Mary's College, University of St Andrews from 1748 to 1780
- Canon Gerald Edgcumbe Hadow OBE (1911–1978) Missionary to Tanzania.
- Gilbert Bethune Hadow (1832–1876) Surgeon in the 1st Battalion 5th Foot (Northumberland Fusiliers)
- Sir Gordon Hadow (1908–1993) masterminded the transition of Gold Coast to independence from Great Britain.
- Grace Eleanor Hadow (1875–1940) author, principal of St Anne's College, Oxford University and former vice-chairman of the Women's Institute
- Principal James Hadow (1667–1747) Principal of St Mary's College, University of St Andrews from 1707 till 1747
- Reverend James Hadow (1757–1847) Vicar of St Margaret's Church, Streatley, Bedfordshire for fifty nine years.
- Sir (Reginald) Michael Hadow former British Ambassador to Israel and Argentina.
- Patrick Douglas Hadow (1812–1876) former Chairman of P&O.
- Patrick Francis Hadow (1855–1946) Wimbledon champion and big game hunter.
- Pen Hadow (1962 - ) British explorer and the first man to walk solo and unsupported the 478 miles (769 km) from the northern coast of Canada to the North Pole.
- Commander Philip Henry Hadow, RN (1903–1942) Commander of HMS Ivanhoe which was mined and damaged in the North Sea.
- Sir Robert Henry Hadow(1895–1963), diplomat and appeaser.
- Walter Hadow (1849-1898) English cricketer, HM Commissioner for Prisons for Scotland.
- Sir William Henry Hadow (1859–1937) educational reformer, musicologist and vice-chancellor of Sheffield University.
