= Mtwango, Njombe =

Coordinates: 9°01′S 34°48′E

Mtwango
- Town and ward
- Interactive map of Mtwango
- Country: Tanzania
- Region: Njombe Region
- District: Njombe

Population (2002)
  - Total: 20,487
- Time zone: UTC+3 (EAT)

Mtwango is a town and ward in Njombe district in the Njombe Region of the Tanzanian Southern Highlands. Its population according to the 2002 Tanzanian census is 20,487.
