= Ludewa District =

District of Njombe Region, Tanzania

Ludewa Wilaya ya Ludewa (Swahili)
- District
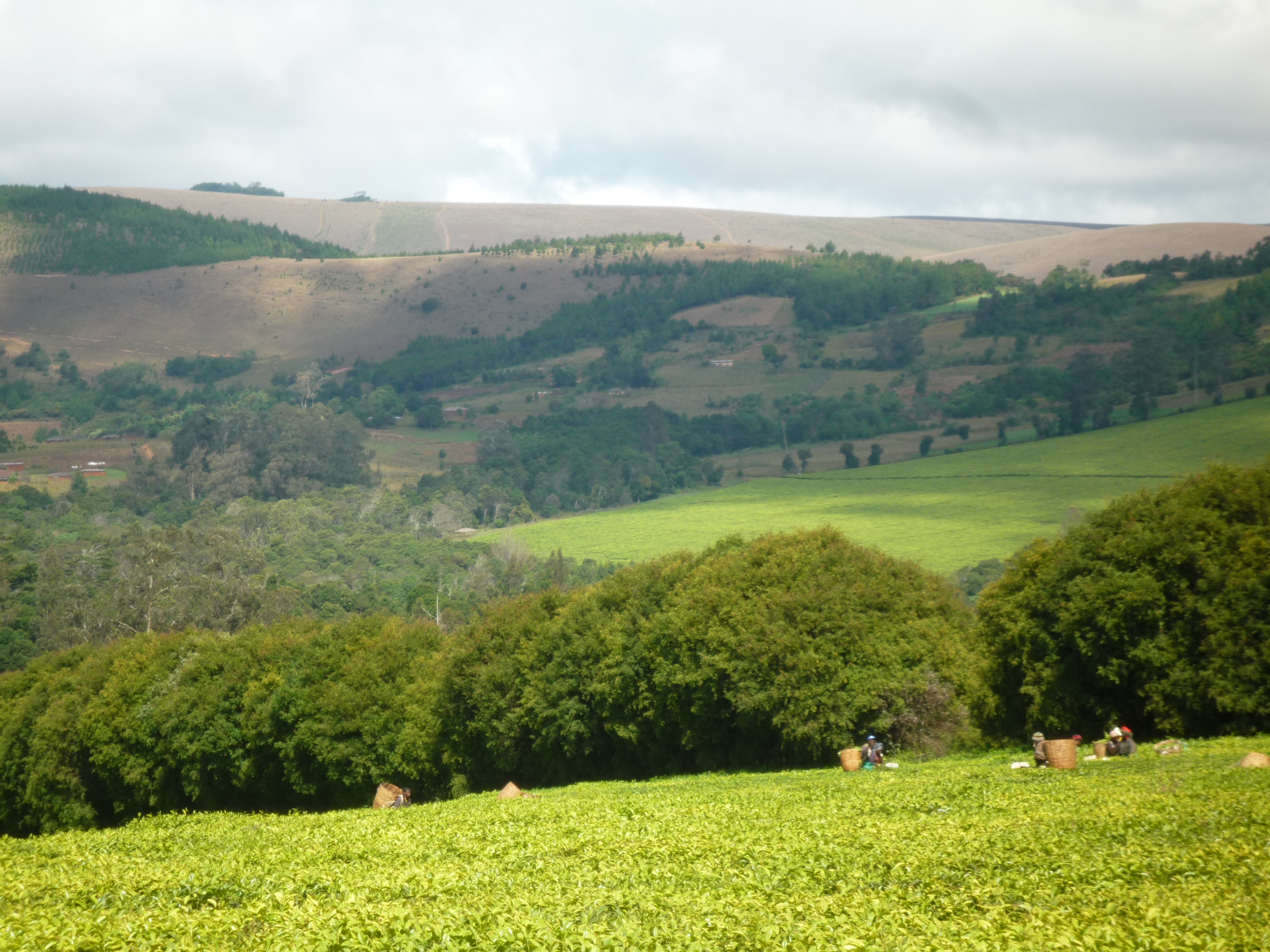
- Tea farms in the South Tanzania Highlands in the Ludewa, Njombe

- Location in Njombe Region
- Coordinates: 10°00′S 34°45′E
- Country: Tanzania
- Region: Njombe Region
- District: Ludewa District
- Established: 31 December 1983

Government
  - Type: Council
  - Chairman: Wise Charles Mgina
  - Director: Sunday N. Deogratias

Area
  - Total: 8,397 km^{2} (3,242 sq mi)

Population (2016)
  - Total: 137,520
  - Density: 16.38/km^{2} (42.42/sq mi)
- Time zone: EAT
- Postcode: 594xx
- Area code: 026
- Website: District Website

Ludewa District is one of six districts in the Njombe Region in Tanzania, East Africa. Prior to 2012, the district was one of the seven districts of Iringa Region. The town of Ludewa is the administrative seat of the district. A hospital is located in the city. The district is bordered to the north by the Njombe Rural District and Makete District, to the southeast by the Ruvuma Region and to the southwest by the country of Malawi across Lake Nyasa.

In 2016 the Tanzania National Bureau of Statistics report there were 137,520 people in the district, from 133,218 in 2012.

== Geography ==
The district has a wide shore of Lake Nyasa with beaches in Lupingu and Manda and the mouth of Ruhuhu River. The district covers and area of 8,397 square kilometres (3,242 sq mi), of which 6,325 km^{2} (2,442 sq mi) that is 75% is land, and 2,072 km^{2} (800 sq mi) that is 25% is water.

== Economy ==
The primary occupations are livestock raising, subsistence farming, and fishing which encompasses 78% of peoples livelihoods.

=== Mining ===
The Liganga iron ore mine in Ludewa is a US$1.8 billion project to mine iron ore and manufacture steel sheets. The complex is to produce one mt/y of steel, iron, titanium dioxide, and vanadium pentoxide.

There is a small amount of artisanal mining of gold and gem quality green tourmaline.

== Administrative subdivisions ==
Ludewa District is administratively divided into five divisions, twenty-six wards, with 77 villages, and 337 vitongoji.

=== Constituencies ===
For parliamentary elections, Tanzania is divided into constituencies. As of the 2010 elections Ludewa District had one constituency:

- Ludewa Constituency

=== Wards ===
Below are the 26 wards as follows:

- Ibumi
- Iwela
- Kilondo
- Lifuma
- Luana
- Ludende
- Ludewa
- Lugarawa
- Luilo
- Lumbila
- Lupanga
- Lupingu
- Madilu
- Madope
- Makonde
- Manda
- Masasi
- Mavanga
- Mawengi
- Milo
- Mkongobaki
- Mlangali
- Mundindi
- Nkomang'ombe
- Ruhuhu
- Lubonde

== Gallery ==
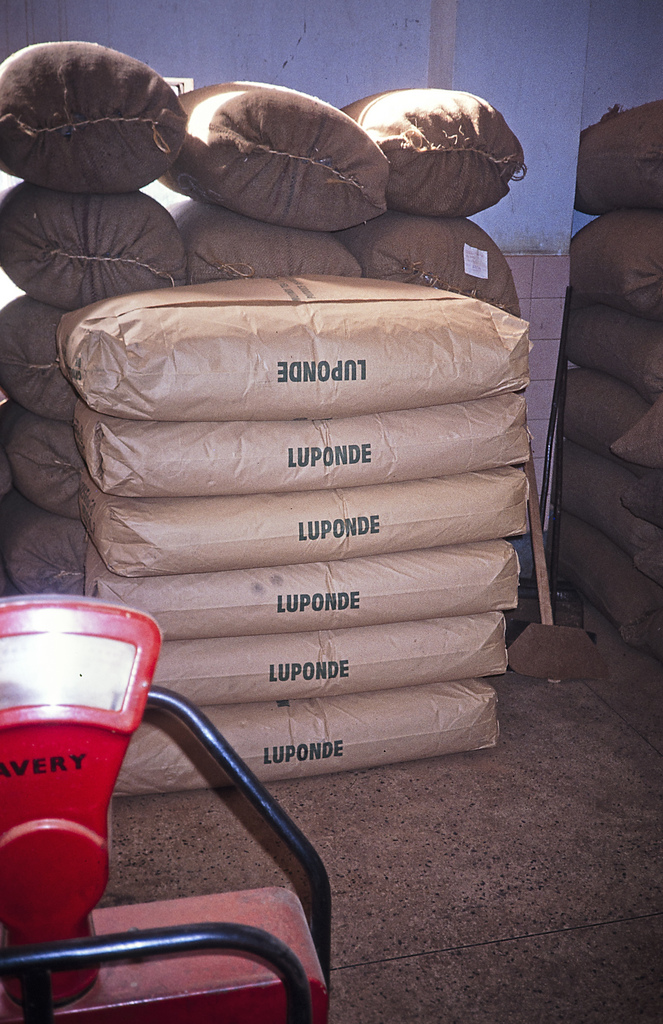
Raw Tea bags before processing at Luponde tea factory in the rear 1992

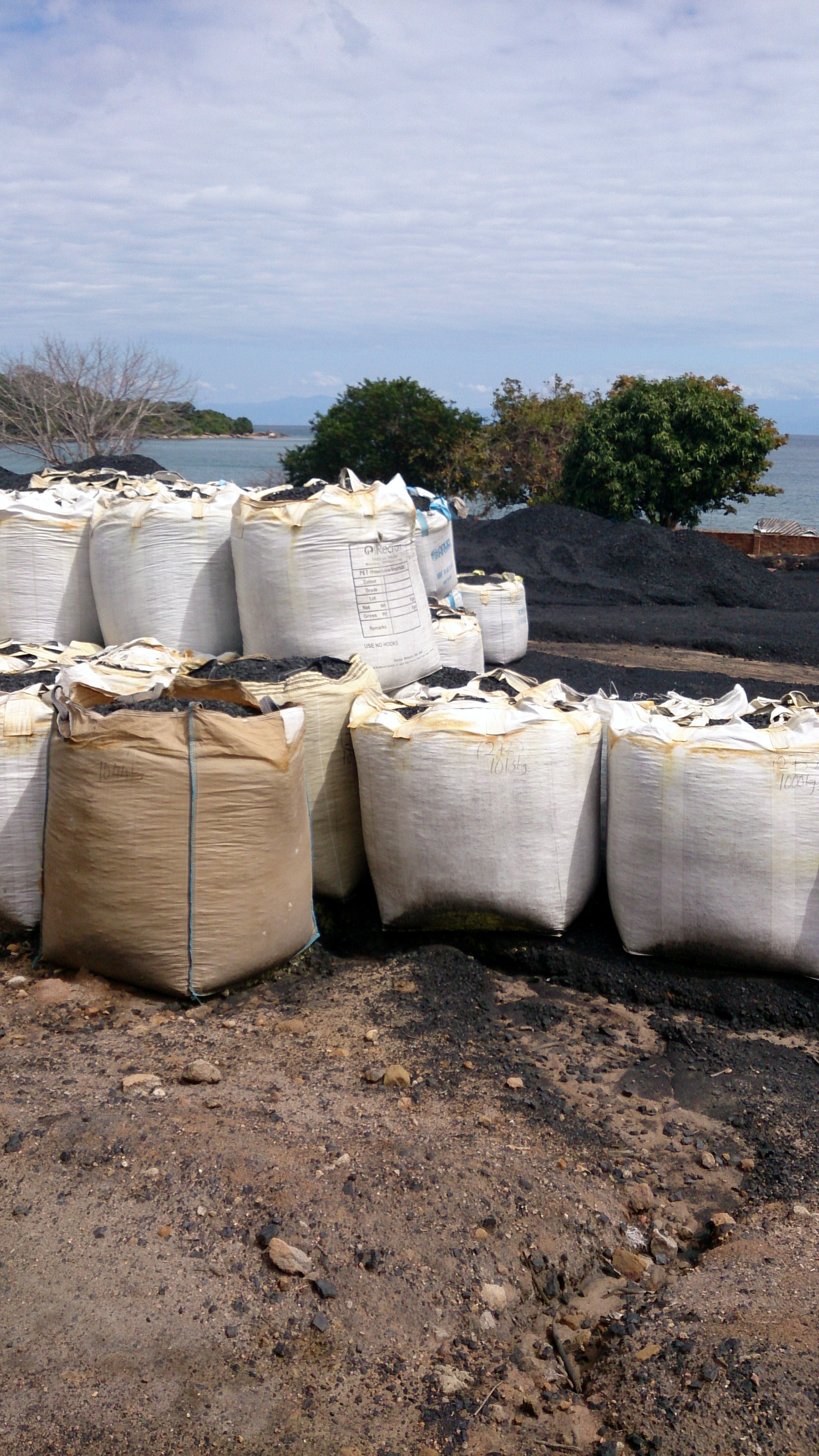
Coal mining in the Ludewa District near the Lake Nyassa

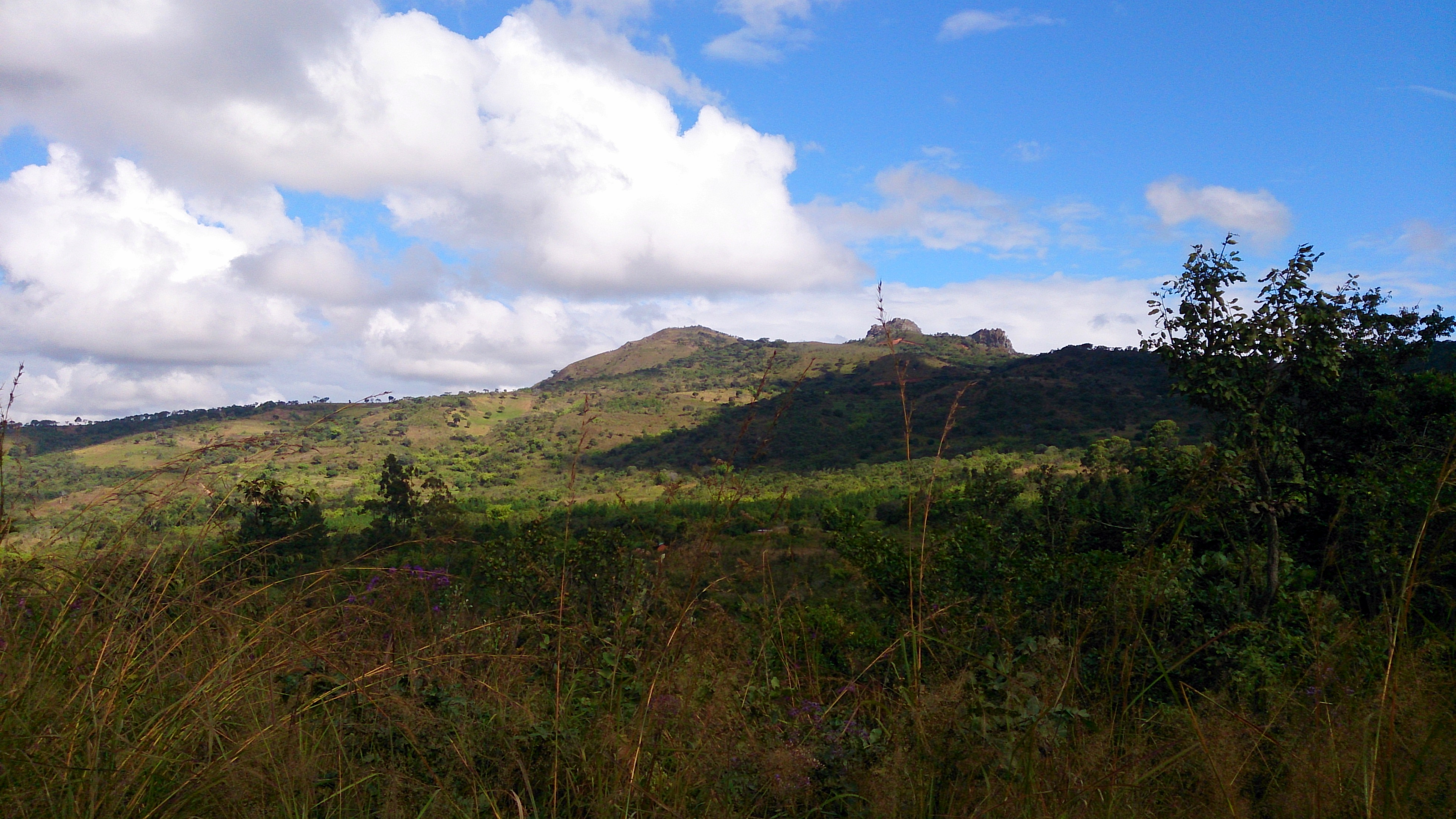
Liganga iron mountain in Ludewa District

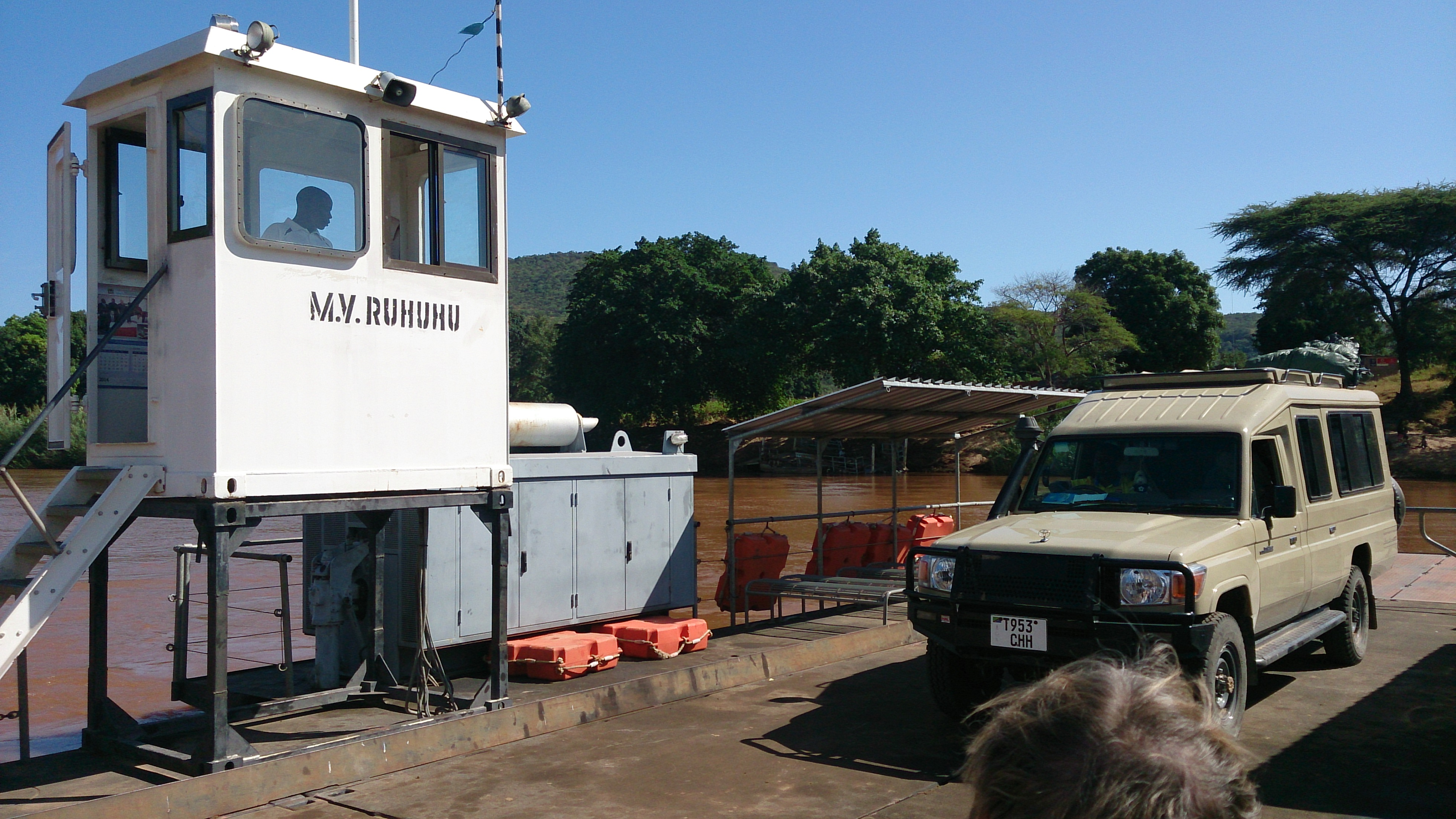
A ferry across the Ruhuhu river in Tanzania
