= Madunda =

Coordinates: 9°52′0″S 34°28′0″E

Madunda is a small settlement in the Ludewa District, Njombe region, Tanzania. It is surrounded by the Livingstone Mountains, from which Lake Malawi can be seen.

The Madunda Secondary School, a boarding school based on parents' initiative, is based there. It is located close to the Catholic church. The school and the region have been supported by the Afrikahilfe Schondorf organisation, which has supplied goods for the school and a dispensary which is run by the local church.

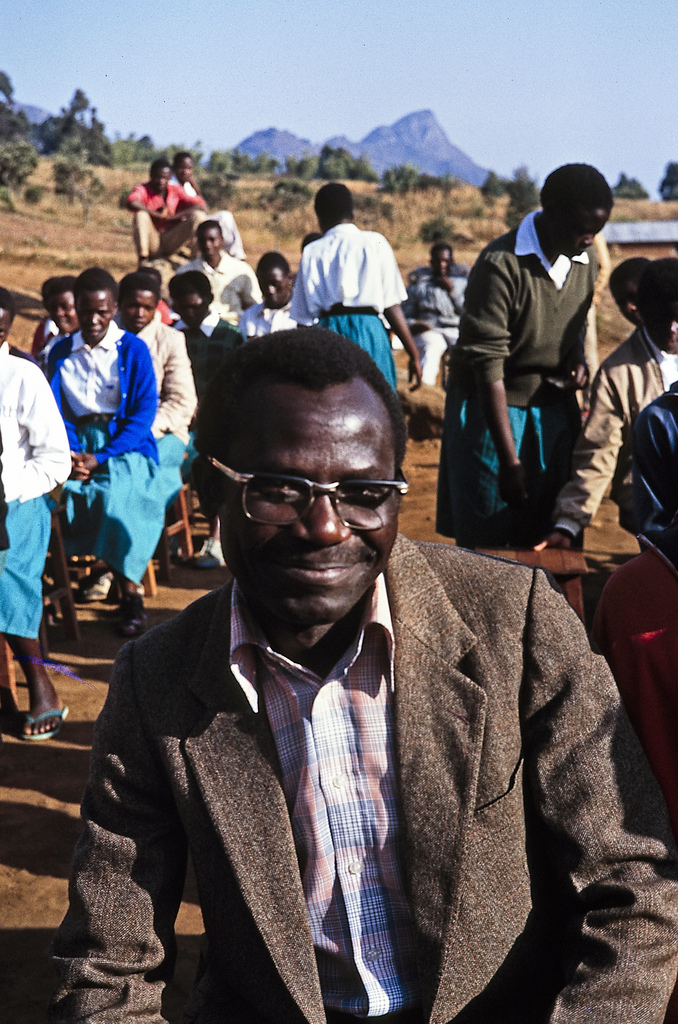
Gerold Pangisa Haule, founder and first headmaster of Madunda Secondary School

== See also ==
- Milo, Tanzania, a village about 15 km east of Madunda
