= Ikondo, Njombe =

Ward in Njombe, Tanzania

Ikondo
- Town and ward
- Location in Tanzania
- Coordinates: 9.100444°S 35.266237°E
- Country: Tanzania
- Region: Njombe Region
- District: Njombe

Population (2016)
  - Total: 7,163
- Time zone: UTC+3 (EAT)

Ikondo is a town and ward in Njombe district in the Njombe Region of the Tanzanian Southern Highlands. In 2016 the Tanzania National Bureau of Statistics report there were 7,163 people in the ward, from 6,312 in 2012.
