= Makambako Urban District =

- District
- Interactive map of Makambako Urban District
- Coordinates: 08°53′S 034°58′E
- Country: Tanzania
- Region: Njombe Region

Area
  - Total: 883.4 km^{2} (341.1 sq mi)

Population (2022 census)
  - Total: 146,481
  - Density: 165.8/km^{2} (429.5/sq mi)

Makambako Urban District (or Makambako Town Council) is one of the six districts of the Njombe Region of Tanzania. Its administrative seat is Makambako town. It is bordered to the north and east by Mufindi District, to the south by Njombe Rural District and to the west by Wanging'ombe District.

According to the 2012 Tanzania National Census, the population of Makambako Urban District was 93,827.

== Transport ==
=== Road ===
Paved Trunk road T1 from Dar es Salaam to the Zambia border passes through the district. In the town of Makambako paved trunk road T6 branches off. This roads passes through Njombe and ends in Songea town, Ruvuma Region.

=== Railway ===
The TAZARA Railway - from Dar es Salaam to Lusaka - passes through the district from east to west; a train station is located in the town of Makambako.

== Administrative subdivisions ==
As of 2012, Makambako Urban District was administratively divided into 8 wards.

=== Wards ===
- Kitandililo
- Lyamkena
- Mahongole
- Mjimwema
- Mlowa
- Mwembetogwa
- Ubena
- Utengule
