= Iwungilo =

Ward in Njombe, Tanzania

Iwungilo Kata ya Iwungilo
- Ward
- Location within Tanzania
- Coordinates: 9.592074°S 34.892824°E
- Country: Tanzania
- Region: Njombe Region
- District: Njombe Urban District
- Ward: Iwungilo

Population (2016)
  - Total: 8,691
- Time zone: UTC+3 (EAT)

Iwungilo is a town and ward in Njombe Urban District in the Njombe Region of the Tanzanian Southern Highlands. In 2016 the Tanzania National Bureau of Statistics report there were 8,691 people in the ward, from 8,419 in 2012.
