= Kidegembye =

Ward in Njombe, Tanzania

Kidegembye Kata ya Kidegembye
- Ward
- Location within Tanzania
- Coordinates: 9.26965183°S 35.014949°E
- Country: Tanzania
- Region: Njombe Region
- District: Njombe Rural District
- Ward: Kidegembye

Population (2016)
  - Total: 8,329
- Time zone: UTC+3 (EAT)

Kidegembye is a town and ward in Njombe Rural District in the Njombe Region of the Tanzanian Southern Highlands. In 2016 the Tanzania National Bureau of Statistics report there were 8,329 people in the ward, from 8,068 in 2012.
