= Ninga, Njombe =

Ninga
- Town and ward
- Location in Tanzania
- Coordinates: 09°06′25″S 35°00′17″E
- Country: Tanzania
- Region: Njombe Region
- District: Njombe Rural District
- Time zone: UTC+3 (EAT)

Ninga is a town and ward in Njombe Rural District in the Njombe Region of the Tanzanian Southern Highlands. Ninga Ward was created since the 2002 Tanzanian census, so the first population reports for the ward will be for the 2012 census. The name Ninga comes from the Swahili word for dove, ninga.

The area is primarily farmland with major crops being maize and coffee.

The ward consists of three towns, or large villages: Ninga, Lima and Isitu. Each of these has rural areas or small villages under them.

Ninga	Lima	Isitu
Mlangali	Ulinzi	Isitu Kati
Ninga Kati	Igelehedza	Landani
Magomati	Mjimwema	
Manyunyu		
