= Njombe Mjini =

Coordinates: 9°20′S 34°46′E

- ward
- Modernist church in Njombe.
- Interactive map of Njombe Mjini
- Country: Tanzania
- Region: Njombe Region
- District: Njombe Urban District

Population (2002)
  - Total: 42,180
- Time zone: UTC+3 (EAT)

Njombe Mjini is an administrative ward in the Njombe Urban District, in the Njombe Region of southern Tanzania.

== Description ==
The ward represents the central downtown area of the City of Njombe. The city is the capital of the Njombe Region, in the Tanzanian Southern Highlands

The Njombe Mjini ward's population was 42,180 in the 2002 Tanzanian census.
