= Saja, Tanzania =

Coordinates: 8°41′S 34°46′E

Saja
- Town and ward
- Interactive map of Saja
- Country: Tanzania
- Region: Njombe Region
- District: Wanging'ombe District

Population (2002)
  - Total: 10,004
- Time zone: UTC+3 (EAT)

Saja is a town and ward in Wanging'ombe District in the Njombe Region of the Tanzanian Southern Highlands. The population of the ward, according to the 2002 Tanzanian census, was 10,004.
