= Wangama =

Coordinates: 6°56′S 34°19′E

- Town and ward
- Interactive map of Wangama
- Country: Tanzania
- Region: Njombe Region
- District: Wanging'ombe District

Population (2002)
  - Total: 3,649
- Time zone: UTC+3 (EAT)

Wangama is a town and ward in Wanging'ombe District in the Njombe Region of the Tanzanian Southern Highlands. The population of the ward, according to the 2002 Tanzanian census, was 3,649.

The ward consists of two towns, or large villages: Wangama and Imalilo. Both of these have rural areas or small villages under them.

Wangama Village	Imalilo Village
Lutowelo	Ilula "A"
Ngelele	Ilula "B"
Mdandu	Msaada
Ikanga	Kibena
Utunidza	Mtakuja
Uhalafu	Ngongomu
