= Ikuna =

Ward in Njombe, Tanzania

Ikuka
- Town and ward
- Location in Tanzania
- Coordinates: 9.207683°S 34.908532°E
- Country: Tanzania
- Region: Njombe Region
- District: Njombe Rural District

Population (2016)
  - Total: 9,474
- Time zone: UTC+3 (EAT)

Ikuna (Ikuka) is a town and ward in Njombe Rural District in the Njombe Region of the Tanzanian Southern Highlands. In 2016 the Tanzania National Bureau of Statistics report there were 9,474 people in the ward, from 9,178 in 2012.
