= Kifanya =

Ward in Njombe, Tanzania

- Town and ward
- Location in Tanzania
- Coordinates: 9.5467030°S 35.1223956°E
- Country: Tanzania
- Region: Njombe Region
- District: Njombe Urban District

Population (2016)
  - Total: 9,302
- Time zone: UTC+3 (EAT)

Kifanya is a town and ward in Njombe Urban District in the Njombe Region of the Tanzanian Southern Highlands.

As of 2022, the ward has four villages, namely Kifanya, Mikongo, Liwengi and Lilombwi, with a total population of 9011 and average people per household of 4.2(National bureau of statistics- Tanzania, March 2013). Main activities within the local area are agriculture and timber industry. The indigenous tribe of the locality is Bena tribe, therefore main languages spoken are bena and kiswahili(National language). If you visit Kifanya expect to hear names like: Mhule, Mgeni, Mwenda, Wandelage, Mayemba, Mtewele and so forth around because they constitute what is indignity of the locality.

The area is seeing what could be described as reasonable technological advancement and economic opening-up. The International telecom union report showed that the number of internet user in Tanzania increased from 3 in 2001 to 20 in 2020. The same progress is seen in the ward with the main usage being on social media(WhatsApp, Facebook and JamiiForum){ITU and world telecommunication ICT database, published 2021}. Main telecom companies that provide network services are VodaCom, tigo and halotel. More could be sought about how this rapidly escalating internet usage rate is of importance to Kifanya or Njombe residents in general. Kifanya has one central tarmac road (Songea road) which is fed by several earth/gravel road(also see; Kifanya-Mikongo: old-Songea road), that are used as supply networks for timber industry. This industry is somehow affected and halted during rainy seasons due to bad conditions that rain sees them into. More about infrastructure, see Kifanya market center).

In 2016 the Tanzania National Bureau of Statistics report there were 9,302 people in the ward, from 9,011 in 2012.
