= Mahongole, Njombe =

Ward in Njombe, Iringa Region, Tanzania

Mahongole Kata ya Mahongole
- Ward
- Location within Tanzania
- Coordinates: 8.61656°S 34.2335°E
- Country: Tanzania
- Region: Iringa Region
- District: Njombe
- Ward: Mahongole

Population (2016)
  - Total: 9,520
- Time zone: UTC+3 (EAT)

Mahongole is a town and ward in Njombe district in the Iringa Region of the Tanzanian Southern Highlands. In 2016 the Tanzania National Bureau of Statistics report there were 9,520 people in the ward, from 9,222 in 2012.
