= 2002 census =

2002 census may refer to:

- Polish census of 2002
- Russian Census (2002)
- Tanzanian census (2002)
