= Ilembula =

Coordinates: 8°54′S 34°35′E

- Town and ward
- Interactive map of Ilembula
- Country: Tanzania
- Region: Njombe Region
- District: Wanging'ombe

Population (2002)
  - Total: 18,126
- Time zone: UTC+3 (EAT)

Ilembula is a town and ward in Wanging'ombe district in the Njombe Region of the Tanzanian Southern Highlands. Its population according to the 2002 Tanzanian census is 18,126.

== International relations ==
=== Twin towns, Sister cities & Partnership cities ===
Ilembula has a partnership relationship with:

- (Finland) Oulu
