= Matola (disambiguation) =

Matola is a city in southern Mozambique.

Matola may also refer to

== People ==
- James Matola (born 1977), Zimbabwean football (soccer) defender
- Sharon Matola (1954–2021), American-born Belizean biologist, conservationist, and zookeeper
- Nando (Mozambican footballer), born Fernando Paulo Matola (1982-2007), Mozambican football (soccer) player

== Places ==
- Matola, a locality in Elche, Spain
- Matola, Tanzania, a town ward in Tanzania
- Matola River, a watercourse located in the Maputo Province of Mozambique
