= Kitandililo =

- Town and ward
- Location in Tanzania
- Coordinates: 08°49′27″S 035°02′40″E
- Country: Tanzania
- Region: Njombe Region
- District: Njombe Rural District
- Time zone: UTC+3 (EAT)

Kitandililo is a town and ward in Njombe Rural District in the Njombe Region of the Tanzanian Southern Highlands. Kitandililo Ward was created since the 2002 Tanzanian census, so the first population reports for the ward will be for the 2012 census. The town lies on both the north and south banks of the Mlenga River, and there is a station there on the TAZARA Railway which passes through the town.

The ward consists of four towns, or large villages: Kitandililo, Ibatu, Nyamande and Mbugani. Each of these has rural areas or small villages under them.

Kitandililo	Ibatu	Nyamande	Mbugani
Uhuru	Ibatu	Uchachikile	Mbugani
Mwongozo	Isaula	Nyamande	Ilongo
Madaraka			Mtenga
Ulinzi			Itulike
Mfumbi			Kichangani
