= Ihanga =

Coordinates: 9°12′46″S 035°02′01″E

- Town and ward
- Interactive map of Ihanga
- Country: Tanzania
- Region: Njombe Region
- District: Njombe Urban District
- Time zone: UTC+3 (EAT)
- Postcode: 59109

Ihanga is a town and ward in Njombe Urban District in the Njombe Region of the Tanzanian Southern Highlands.
