= Igosi =

Ward in Wanging'ombe, Njombe, Tanzania

- Town and ward
- Location in Tanzania
- Coordinates: 9.2537503°S 34.504685°E
- Country: Tanzania
- Region: Njombe Region
- District: Wanging'ombe District

Population (2016)
  - Total: 7,437
- Time zone: UTC+3 (EAT)
- Area code: 121

Igosi is a town and ward in Wanging'ombe district in the NJOMBE of the Tanzanian Southern Highlands. In 2016 the Tanzania National Bureau of Statistics report there were 7,437 people in the ward, from 7,204 in 2012.
