= Pangwa language =

Bantu language of Tanzania

Pangwa
- Ekipangwa
- Native to: Tanzania
- Native speakers: 95,000 (2002)
- Language family: Niger–Congo?: Atlantic–Congo; Volta-Congo; Benue–Congo; Bantoid; Southern Bantoid; Bantu; Northeast Bantu; Kisi-Pangwa; Pangwa

Language codes
- ISO 639-3: pbr
- Glottolog: pang1287
- Guthrie code: G.64
- Linguasphere: 99-AUS-uc

The Pangwa are a Bantu ethnolinguistic group based in the Kipengere Range on the eastern shore of Lake Malawi, in the Ludewa District of Njombe Region in southern Tanzania. In 2002 the Pangwa population was estimated to number 95,000 . The Pangwa language is a member of the Bantu family.

Alternate names for Pangwa are Ekipangwa and Kipangwa.

== See also ==
- Nena people
