= Lupembe =

Ward in Njombe, Tanzania

Lupembe Kata ya Lupembe
- Ward
- Location within Tanzania
- Coordinates: 9.2743503°S 35.23594357°E
- Country: Tanzania
- Region: Njombe Region
- District: Njombe Rural District
- Ward: Lupembe

Population (2016)
  - Total: 7,958
- Time zone: UTC+3 (EAT)

Lupembe is a town and ward in Njombe Rural District in the Njombe Region of the Tanzanian Southern Highlands.

In 2016 the Tanzania National Bureau of Statistics report there were 7,958 people in the ward, from 7,709 in 2012.
