= Nena people =

Nena
Total population
- unknown

Regions with significant populations
- Livingstone Mountains, Tanzania

Languages
- unknown (Bena? Pangwa?)

Related ethnic groups
- unknown (Bena? Pangwa?)

The Nena people are an African tribe first encountered in the last quarter of the 19th century in the north-east Livingstone Mountains in what is now Tanzania by two different European travellers. The Scottish explorer Joseph Thomson stumbled across them in 1879 during his journey from the East African coast to Lake Nyasa (now also known as Lake Malawi) (Thomson 1881). Eighteen years later, in 1897, they were encountered a second time by the German priest Alphonse Adams (Adams 1899).

Thomson and Adams' accounts had a number of similarities, which makes it probable that they met the same group of people. However, the next European visitor could find no trace of the Nena (Fülleborn 1906): they went missing from the ethnographic record and did not feature in subsequent German and British colonial reports. In the 1970s, however, people called Nena were reported to be living much further south in the Livingstone Mountains, and they were presumed to be related to the group described by Thomson and Adams (Stirnimann 1976). It remains to be established whether this is the case.
