= Luponde =

Ward in Njombe, Tanzania

Luponde Kata ya Luponde
- Ward
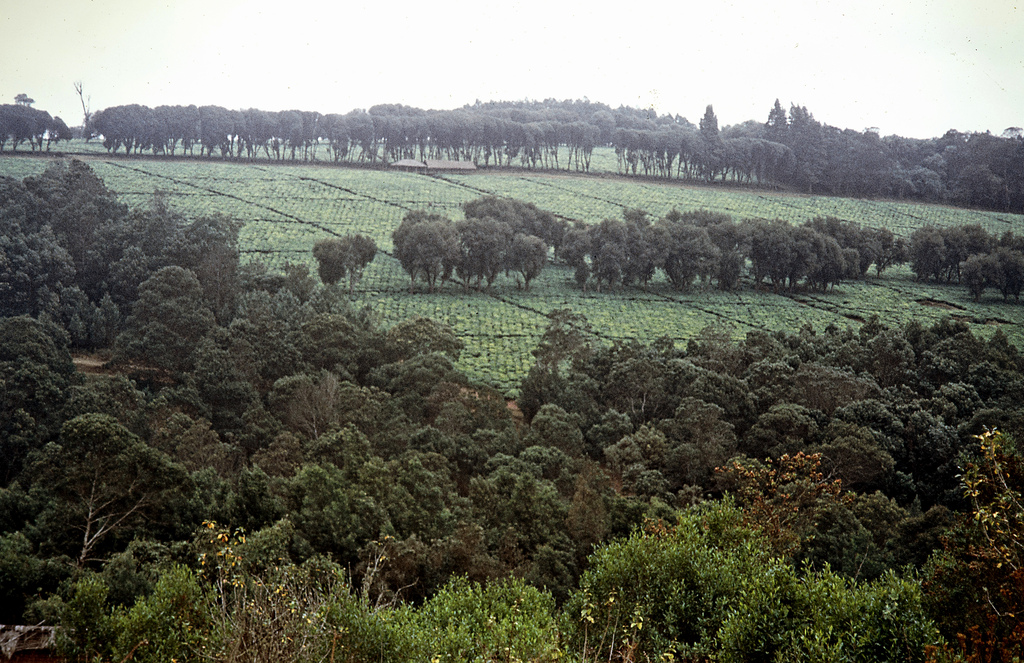
- Luponde tea farm

- Location within Tanzania
- Coordinates: 10.248349°S 38.699212°E
- Country: Tanzania
- Region: Njombe Region
- District: Njombe Urban District
- Ward: Luponde

Population (2016)
  - Total: 9,675
- Time zone: UTC+3 (EAT)

Luponde is a town and ward in Njombe Urban District in the Njombe Region of the Tanzanian Southern Highlands. The biggest employer is the Luponde tea factory.

In 2016 the Tanzania National Bureau of Statistics report there were 9,675 people in the ward, from 9,372 in 2012.
