= Lugenge =

- Town and ward
- Location in Tanzania
- Coordinates: 09°27′51″S 34°35′29″E
- Country: Tanzania
- Region: Njombe Region
- District: Njombe Urban District
- Time zone: UTC+3 (EAT)
- Postcode: 59111

Lugenge is a town and ward in Njombe Urban District in the Njombe Region of the Tanzanian Southern Highlands.
