= Yakobi =

- Town and ward
- Location in Tanzania
- Coordinates: 9°25′S 34°56′E
- Country: Tanzania
- Region: Njombe Region
- District: Njombe

Population (2002)
  - Total: 5,904
- Time zone: UTC+3 (EAT)

Yakobi is a town and ward in Njombe district in the Njombe Region of the Tanzanian Southern Highlands. Its population, according to the 2002 Tanzanian census, is 5,904.
