= Luduga =

Ward in Wanging'ombe, Njombe, Tanzania

Luduga Kata ya Luduga
- Ward
- Location within Tanzania
- Coordinates: 8.8595622°S 34.48668757°E
- Country: Tanzania
- Region: Njombe Region
- District: Wanging'ombe District
- Ward: Luduga

Population (2016)
  - Total: 9,587
- Time zone: UTC+3 (EAT)

Luduga is a village and ward in Wanging'ombe District in the Njombe Region of the Tanzanian Southern Highlands.

In 2016 the Tanzania National Bureau of Statistics report there were 9,587 people in the ward, from 11,947 in 2012.
