= Lyamkena =

- Town and ward
- Location in Tanzania
- Coordinates: 8°54′10″S 34°49′02″E
- Country: Tanzania
- Region: Njombe Region
- District: Njombe Urban District
- Time zone: UTC+3 (EAT)
- Postcode: 59116

Lyamkena is a town and ward in Makambako Urban District in the Njombe Region of the Tanzanian Southern Highlands.
