= Wanging'ombe =

- Town and ward
- Interactive map of Wanging'ombe
- Coordinates: 08°51′10″S 034°37′56″E
- Country: Tanzania
- Region: Njombe Region
- District: Wanging'ombe District

Population (2002)
  - Total: 18,545
- Time zone: UTC+3 (EAT)
- UFI: -2574657

Wanging'ombe (Wangi Ngombe) is a town and ward in Wanging'ombe District in the Njombe Region of the Tanzanian Southern Highlands. As of 2002, the population of the ward was 18,545.

== History ==
In 2012 it was incorporated in the new eponymous district of the new Njombe Region. Prior to that it was part of the old Njombe District in the Iringa Region.
