= Usuka =

Ward in Njombe, Iringa, Tanzania

Usuka Kata ya Usuka
- Ward
- Location within Tanzania
- Coordinates: 8.971225°S 34.641947°E
- Country: Tanzania
- Region: Iringa Region
- District: Njombe District
- Ward: Usuka

Population (2016)
  - Total: 6,344
- Time zone: UTC+3 (EAT)

Usuka is a town and ward in Njombe District in the Iringa Region of the Tanzanian Southern Highlands. In 2016 the Tanzania National Bureau of Statistics report there were 6,344 people in the ward, from 6,146 in 2012.
