= Gerald Edgcumbe Hadow =

British Christian missionary

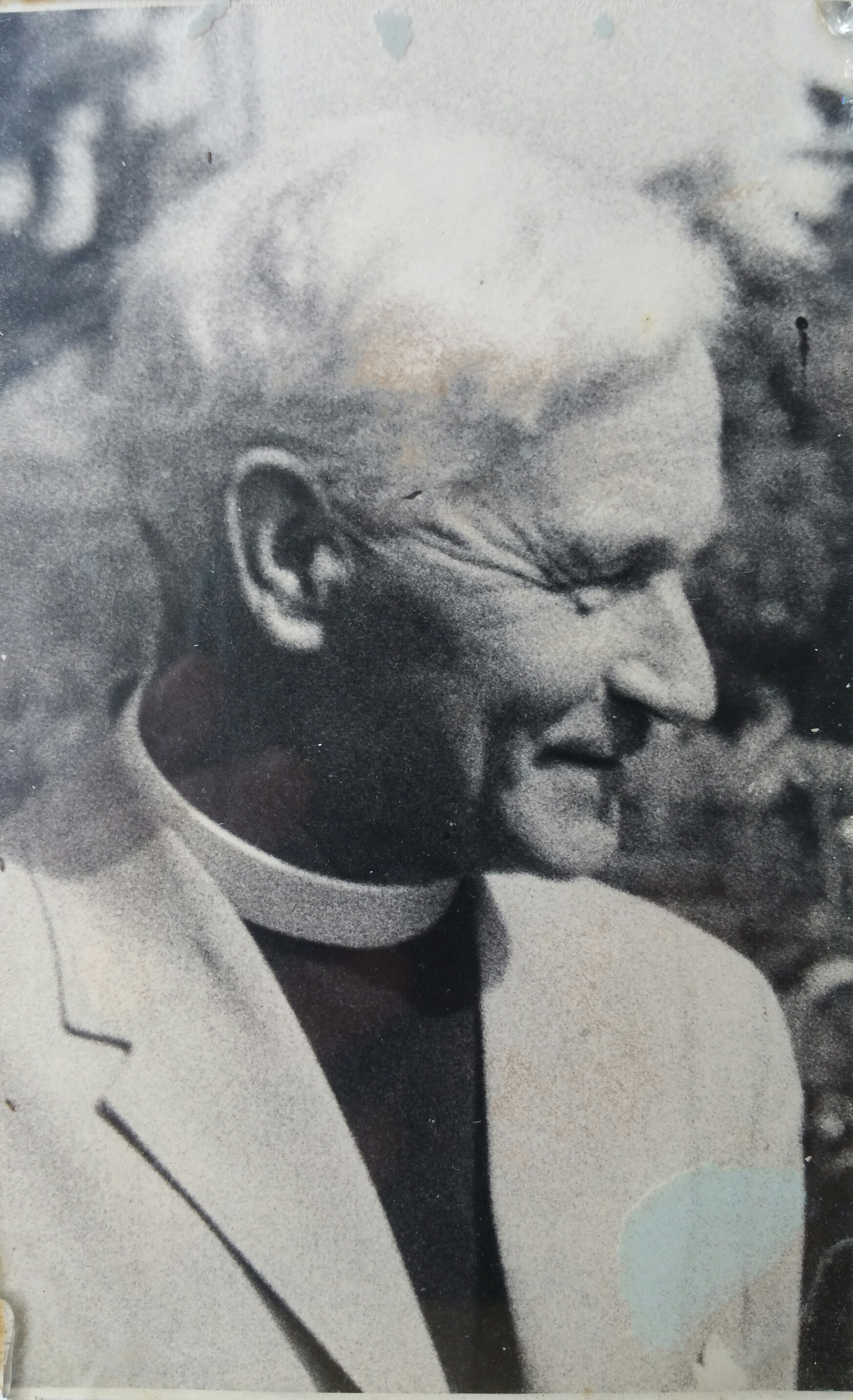
Gerald Edgcumbe Hadow OBE was an English Christian missionary to East Africa in the mid-twentieth century

Gerald Edgcumbe Hadow OBE (13 June 1911 – 27 February 1978 Cambridge) was a British Christian missionary in East Africa.

== Early life ==
He was the son of Canon Herbert Edgcumbe Hadow and Edith Rose Abell. He grew up at Quedgeley Vicarage, Gloucestershire. He attended Haileybury College, leaving in about 1930. From there he went to Oriel College, Oxford University. His uncle was musician Sir William Henry Hadow and his aunt author Grace Eleanor Hadow. He was a keen singer and was a Tenor Solo at Haileybury College.

== Later life ==
He was ordained a priest at Bristol Cathedral in 1936. He was a missionary for the Society for the Propagation of the Gospel in Foreign Parts in East Africa from 1939 to 1977. He served in Manda, Likoma and Milo, Tanzania. During this time in South Western Tanzania he was a regular visitor to Uwemba Mission in the Livingstone Mountains. He was fluent in Swahili and also spoke Kipanga, the local tongue in Milo. He was interested in the different Swahili dialects. In 1961 he was awarded the Order of the British Empire, and in 1972 he was made Canon of the Diocese of South West Tanganyika

He was taken ill at Milo in 1977 and travelled back to Cambridge, where he died ten weeks later.
