= Wanji people =

Ethnic group from Njombe Region of Tanzania

The Wanji are a Bantu ethnolinguistic group native to Makete District, in the Kipengere Mountains of Njombe Region and also native to Mbeya Region in southern Tanzania. In 2003 the Wanji population was estimated to number 28,000. The wanji language is the composition of nearby languages like Sangu, Kinga, Nyakyusa, Safwa and Bena.
