= Idamba =

Ward in Njombe, Iringa, Tanzania

- Town and ward
- Location within Tanzania
- Coordinates: 9.413288°S 35.283880°E
- Country: Tanzania
- Region: Iringa Region
- District: Njombe

Population (2016)
  - Total: 3,250
- Time zone: UTC+3 (EAT)

Idamba is a town and ward in Njombe district in the Iringa Region of the Tanzanian Southern Highlands. In 2016 the Tanzania National Bureau of Statistics report there were 3,250 people in the ward, from 3,148 in 2012.
