= Igongolo =

Ward in Iringa, Tanzania

- Town and ward
- Location in Tanzania
- Coordinates: 8.9691098°S 34.90073°E
- Country: Tanzania
- Region: Iringa Region
- District: Njombe

Population (2016)
  - Total: 8,720
- Time zone: UTC+3 (EAT)

Igongolo is a town and ward in Njombe district in the Iringa Region of the Tanzanian Southern Highlands. In 2016 the Tanzania National Bureau of Statistics report there were 8,720 people in the ward, from 8,447 in 2012.
