= Imalinyi =

Coordinates: 9°11′S 34°38′E

- Town and ward
- Interactive map of Imalinyi
- Country: Tanzania
- Region: Iringa Region
- District: Njombe

Population (2002)
  - Total: 23,602
- Time zone: UTC+3 (EAT)

Imalinyi is a town and ward in Njombe district in the Iringa Region of the Tanzanian Southern Highlands. Its population according to the 2002 Tanzanian census is 23,602.
