= Mdandu =

- Town and ward
- Location in Tanzania
- Coordinates: 09°08′48″S 34°41′30″E
- Country: Tanzania
- Region: Njombe Region
- District: Wanging'ombe

Population (2002)
  - Total: 26,149
- Time zone: UTC+3 (EAT)
- UFI: -2568732

Mdandu is a town and ward in Wanging'ombe District of Njombe Region in the southern highlands of Tanzania, East Africa. As of 2002, the population of the ward was 26,149.
