= Uwemba =

Ward in Njombe, Iringa, Tanzania

Uwemba Kata ya Uwemba
- Ward
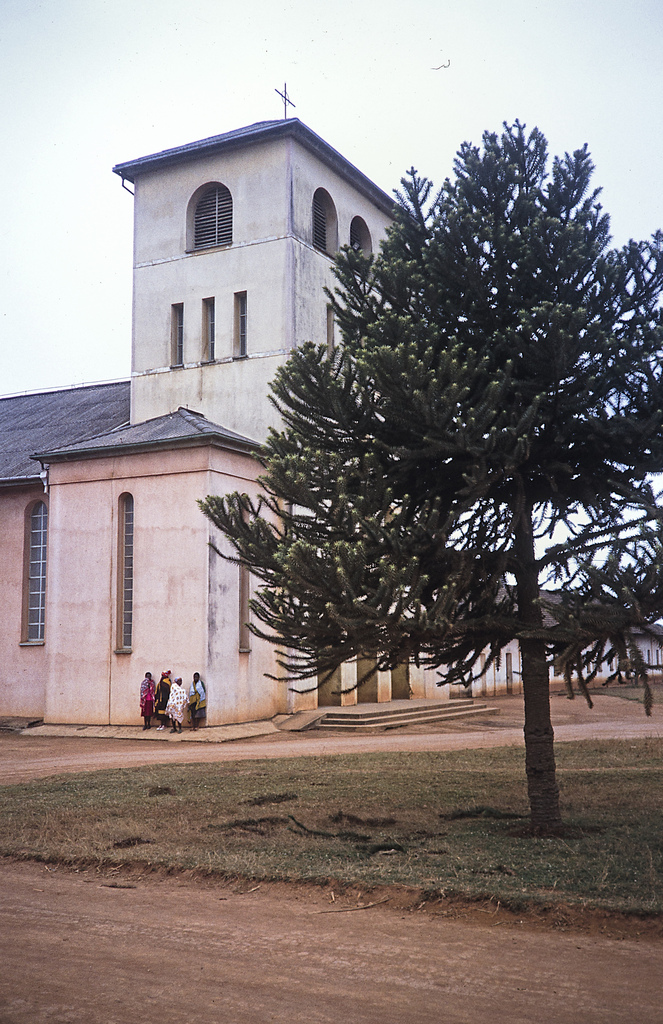
- Uwemba monastery

- Location within Tanzania
- Coordinates: 9.474839°S 34.786409°E
- Country: Tanzania
- Region: Iringa Region
- District: Njombe District
- Ward: Uwemba

Population (2016)
  - Total: 9,187
- Time zone: UTC+3 (EAT)

Uwemba is a town and ward in Njombe District in the Iringa Region of the Tanzanian Southern Highlands. Uwemba has a big Benedictines monastery and Secondary school. Economic activities includes agriculture (farming Irish potatoes, maize, wheat) and business.

In 2016 the Tanzania National Bureau of Statistics report there were 9,187 people in the ward, from 8,900 in 2012.
