= Milo, Tanzania =

Village in Tanzania

Coordinates: 9°53′S 34°39′E

Milo is a village in south western Tanzania, East Africa, in the southern highlands of Tanzania, three hours drive from the nearest region of Njombe. It has a mission run by the United Society for the Propagation of the Gospel and a hospital, St. Luke's. Its name originates from Milow, a municipality in east Brandenburg, Germany, the birthplace in honor of its first sponsor Carl Bolle, a businessman.

== St Luke's Hospital ==
St Luke's is an Anglican mission hospital run by the Diocese of South West Tanganyika. It serves a population of about 150,000 and people come from a radius of 40 kilometres (25 mi), sometimes walking for two days to reach the hospital. The hospital has 50 beds with male, female and maternity wards. Relatives cook all the food required by ‘their’ patient whilst they are in the hospital, themselves staying in a very basic hostel. There is also an Outpatients Dispensary that treats about 5,500 people a year. Dr Simeon is the only doctor. There is no main electricity, only a diesel generator that operates for two hours every day. There is no gas or oil heating and patients can get very cold on the frosty nights. Pneumonia, malaria, TB, diarrhoea are commonly treated, but there is also a large incidence of AIDS. The Church is giving a lead in trying to make people aware of the dangers of HIV.

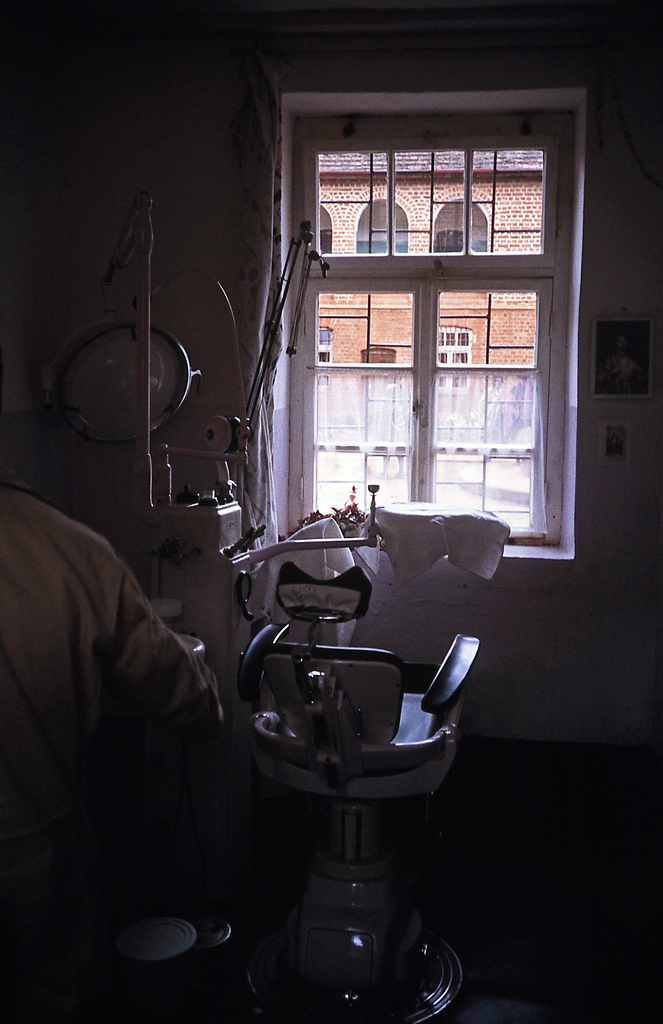

The mission has a link with The Parish Church of St. James, Hampton Hill, England and the parish of St Luke with St Bartholomew Reading through the USPG. The information above comes from St James' website and updated by St Luke's after the visit from USPG in October 2010. The previous Doctor had died. Several Italian doctors have worked here.

An early missionary to Milo was Gerald Edgcumbe Hadow.

== Local area ==
Swahili, the national language of Tanzania, is widely spoken in Milo. The local language is known as Kipangwa. the village currently will benefit from the hydro-electricity project from Mawengi village. By March 2019, the project will be finished. Hopefully the hospital will have sufficient sources of power and energy instead of using a generator.

There is a small village called Madunda about 15 km west of Milo, near the shore of Lake Malawi.

Madunda is located on the base of Mount Living stone which on the other side of Mountains there is Lake Nyasa. Timber production dominates the major area of Madunda (Mawengi at all).
