= Wanging'ombe District =

- District
- location in Njombe Region
- Coordinates: 08°51′S 034°38′E
- Country: Tanzania
- Region: Njombe Region

Area
  - Total: 3,437 km^{2} (1,327 sq mi)

Population (2022)
  - Total: 191,506
  - Density: 55.72/km^{2} (144.3/sq mi)

Wanging'ombe District is one of the six districts of the Njombe Region of Tanzania, East Africa. The administrative seat is in Igwachanya. According to the 2022 Tanzania National Census, the population of Igunga District was 191,506 in 2022.

== History ==
Wanging'ombe District was formally established when it was gazetted in March 2012. It was created out of part of the old Njombe District that had been in Iringa Region.

== Wards ==
As of 2015, Wanging'ombe District was administratively divided into 21 wards:

1. Saja
2. Uhenga
3. Kijombe
4. Wanging'ombe
5. Ilembula
6. Udonja
7. Uhambule
8. Usuka
9. Igwachanya
10. Mdandu
11. Itulahumba
12. Igima
13. Imalinyi
14. Ulembwe
15. Makoga
16. Kipengele
17. Igosi
18. Wangama
19. Kidugala
20. Luduga
21. Malangali
