= Edward Ash Hadow =

English chemist

Edward Ash Hadow (18 April 1831 – 11 August 1866) was an English chemist.

== Early life and education ==
Edward Ash Hadow was born in Clifton, Bristol. He was the son of George John Hadow (1789–1869) of the Madras Civil Service and later of Sundon House, Clifton and Margaret Julia Timins (1796–1875) and grandson of Reverend James Hadow of Streatley, Bedfordshire.

He attended Bristol medical school and subsequently the University of London. He achieved a diploma of the Royal College of surgeons and a bachelor of medicine. At King's College, London, he won a Daniell Scholarship following an essay on gun-cotton.

== Career ==
Hadow became demonstrator of chemistry at King’s College and studied the detection of alum in bread. His research also examined the action of oxidizing agents on the sulphocyanides and the method of converting them into cyanides and the composition of the platinocyanides.

Hadow also invented a process for producing "soluble cotton", involved in early photography This formula is described in the Photographic Journal.

== Personal life ==
In 1865, Hadow married Mary Ann Robinson. On 11 August 1866, Hadow died of pneumonia. Hadow was 35.

== Publications ==
- "Notes on the action of oxidising agents on sulphocyanides" Q. J. Chem. Soc., 1859, 11, 174 - 180
- "The Platinum bases" Journal of the Chemical Society: Transactions, Volume 4; Volume 19

He was joint editor of Hardwich’s Manual of Photography.
