= Matola, Tanzania =

Matola
- Town and ward
- Country: Tanzania
- Region: Iringa Region
- District: Njombe

Population (2002)
  - Total: 14,106
- Time zone: UTC+3 (EAT)

Matola is a town and ward in Njombe district in the Iringa Region of the Tanzanian Southern Highlands. Its population according to the 2002 Tanzanian census is 14,106.
