= Ramadhani =

Ramadhani may refer to the following people

Given name

- Ramadhani Athumani Maneno, Tanzanian politician

Surname

- John Ramadhani (born 1932), Tanzanian Anglican archbishop
- Nia Ramadhani (born 1990), Indonesian actress, singer, rapper, and dancer
- Samson Ramadhani (born 1982), Tanzanian marathon runner
- Sara Ramadhani (born 1987), Tanzanian long-distance runner
- Waso Ramadhani (born 1984), Burundian football defender

== See also ==
- Ramadani
