= Bena language =

Bantu language spoken in Tanzania

Bena
- Ekibena
- Native to: Tanzania
- Ethnicity: Bena
- Native speakers: 590,000 (2009)
- Language family: Niger–Congo?: Atlantic–Congo; Benue–Congo; Bantoid; Bantu; Northeast Bantu; Bena–Kinga (G60); Bena
- Dialects: Bena; Benamanga

Language codes
- ISO 639-3: Either: bez – Bena egm – Benemanga (includes Kidugala and Lupembe dialects)
- Glottolog: bena1262
- Guthrie code: G.63
- Linguasphere: 99-AUS-ub incl. varieties 99-AUS-uba...-ubg

Bena is a Bantu language spoken by the Bena people of the Iringa region of Tanzania.

== Phonology ==
=== Consonants ===
| | | Labial | Alveolar | Palatal | Velar | Glottal |
|---|---|---|---|---|---|---|
| Nasal | | m | n | ɲ | ŋ | |
| Plosive | voiceless | p | t | | k | |
| Plosive | voiced | b | d | | ɡ | |
| Plosive | prenasal | ᵐb | ⁿd | | ᵑɡ | |
| Affricate | | | ts | | | |
| Fricative | voiceless | f | s | | | h |
| Fricative | voiced | v | | | | |
| Fricative | prenasal | | ⁿs | | | |
| Approximant | | | l | j | w | |

Voiceless sounds almost always occur as aspirated stops; [pʰ, tʰ, kʰ].

- /v/ can be realized as [ʋ] intervocalically.
- [ɖ] can occur as an allophone of /d/ before long non high vowels.
- [x] can occur as an allophone of /k/, /h/ in the Maswamu dialect.
- [cç, tʃ] can occur as allophones of /ts/, in the Twangabita dialect.
- [ⁿz] can occur as an allophone of /ⁿs/.
- [ɟ] can occur as an allophone of /j/ in the Maswamu dialect.
- [β, ʋ] can occur as allophones of /w/ among some speakers.
- Prenasalised stops may be devoiced when occurring word-finally (ex. /ᵐb/ ~ [ᵐb̥]).

=== Vowels ===
| | Front | Central | Back |
|---|---|---|---|
| High | i iː | | u uː |
| Mid | ɛ eː | | o oː |
| Low | | a aː | |

- /i, u/ before non-rounded vowels are recognized as glides [j, w].
