= Bena people =

Ethnic group from Njombe Region of Tanzania

The Bena or Wabena are a Bantu ethnolinguistic group based in the Njombe Region of south-central Tanzania who speak the Bantu Bena language. In 2001, the Bena population was estimated to number 670,000.

Groups include the Bena of Njombe highlands and their offshoot, the Bena of Ulanga.

== See also ==
- Nena people
- List of ethnic groups in Tanzania
