= Ludewa =

Town and ward of Ludewa District, Njombe Region

- Town and Ward
- Location of Ludewa Town
- Coordinates: 10°06′03″S 034°41′01″E
- Country: Tanzania
- Region: Njombe Region
- District: Ludewa District

Population (2002)
  - Total: 8,747
- Time zone: UTC+3 (EAT)

Ludewa is a town and ward in Ludewa District of Njombe Region in Tanzania, East Africa. The town is the administrative seat for Ludewa District. As of the 2002 census, the ward had a population of 8,747.

== Notes ==
Major economic activities are agriculture (food crops & animal keeping), fishing is conducted in some parts (along Lake Nyasa) and to a small extent timber production is conducted in different parts (wards) of the district.

Major transport system is road, which join various parts of the district. the main road is from Njombe to Ludewa town, then continues up to Manda (Nyasa lake shore).
