= 2002 Tanzanian census =

The 2002 Tanzanian census was conducted in August 2002 by the National Bureau of Statistics (NBS) of the Government of Tanzania. This included a census of agriculture in the country providing important data about the economy.
