= Njombe =

Capital city of Njombe Region, Tanzania

- City of Njombe Region
- Church in Njombe town.

- Location in Tanzania
- Coordinates: 09°20′S 34°46′E
- Country: Tanzania
- Region: Njombe Region
- District: Njombe Urban District

Population (2012)
  - Total: 40,607
- Time zone: GMT + 3
- Website: www.tanzania.go.tz

Njombe is a town in southern Tanzania. It is the regional capital of Njombe Region as well as the district headquarter of Njombe Rural District and Njombe Urban District. It is located at nearly 2000 meters of altitude on the eastern edge of the Kipengere Range and has the reputation of being a cold town.

== Transport ==
=== Road ===
Paved Trunk road T6 from Makambako to Songea passes through the town.

=== Railway Station ===
The nearest train station on the TAZARA Railway – from Dar es Salaam to Lusaka – is located in the town of Makambako.

=== Airport ===
The nearest airstrip in Njombe is available at Melinze street near Mjimwema ward, most of time the airport is used by private flights and three years back there was commercial flight from Njombe airport to Dar es Salaam airport terminal 1 by Auriq air

== Population ==
According to the 2012 national census the population of Njombe town – Njombe Mjini and Mjimwema wards – is 40,607.
