= National Bureau of Statistics (Tanzania) =

Tanzania

- Ofisi ya Taifa ya Takwimu (Swahili)

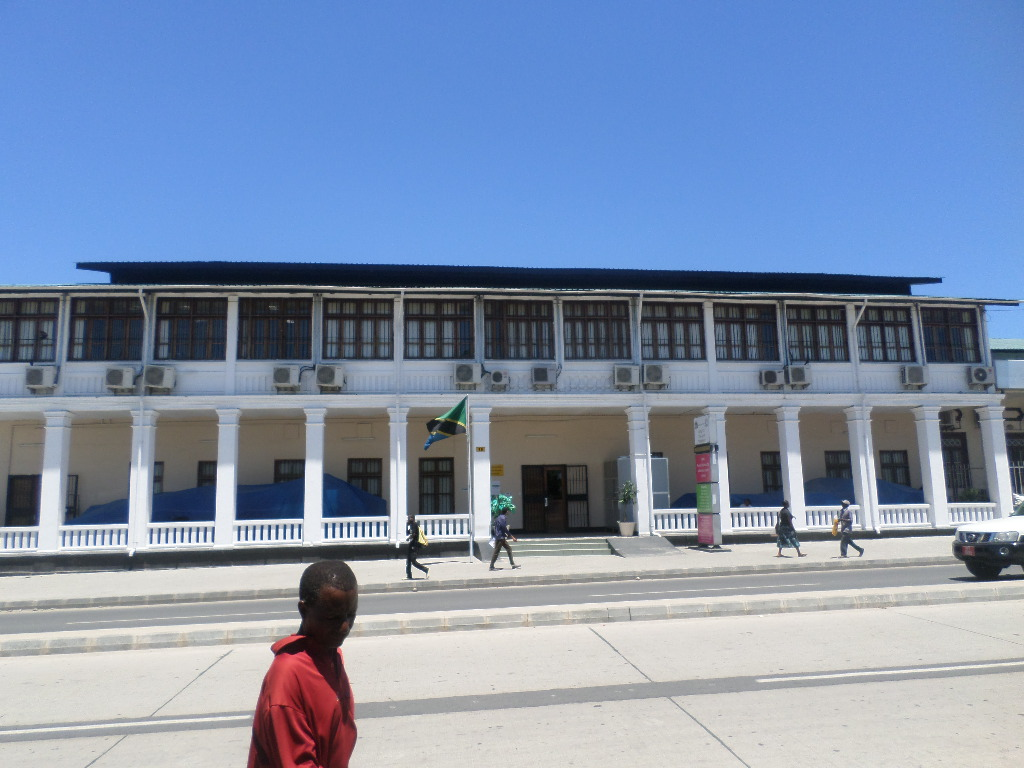

Government agency overview
- Formed: 26 March 1999
- Preceding Government agency: Bureau of Statistics
- Jurisdiction: Tanzania mainland^{1}
- Headquarters: P.O. Box 2683, Dodoma
- Motto: Statistics for development
- Minister responsible: Ministry of Finance and Planning
- Government agency executive: Dr. Albina A. Chuwa, Statistician General
- Key document: Statistics Act No 9, 2015
- Website: www.nbs.go.tz

Footnotes
- ^{1} Applies to Zanzibar in the case of census and some of surveys

The National Bureau of Statistics is a branch of the Government of Tanzania which has the mandate to provide official statistics to the Government of Tanzania, business community and the public at large. It is based in Dodoma and obtains a wide range of economic, social and demographic statistics about the country. The bureau compiled data on every village in Tanzania for the censuses of 2002, 2012 and 2022, but also provides the results of the previous censuses of 1967, 1978 and 1988.
