= Njombe Region =

Region of Tanzania

Njombe Region Mkoa wa Njombe (Swahili)
- Region
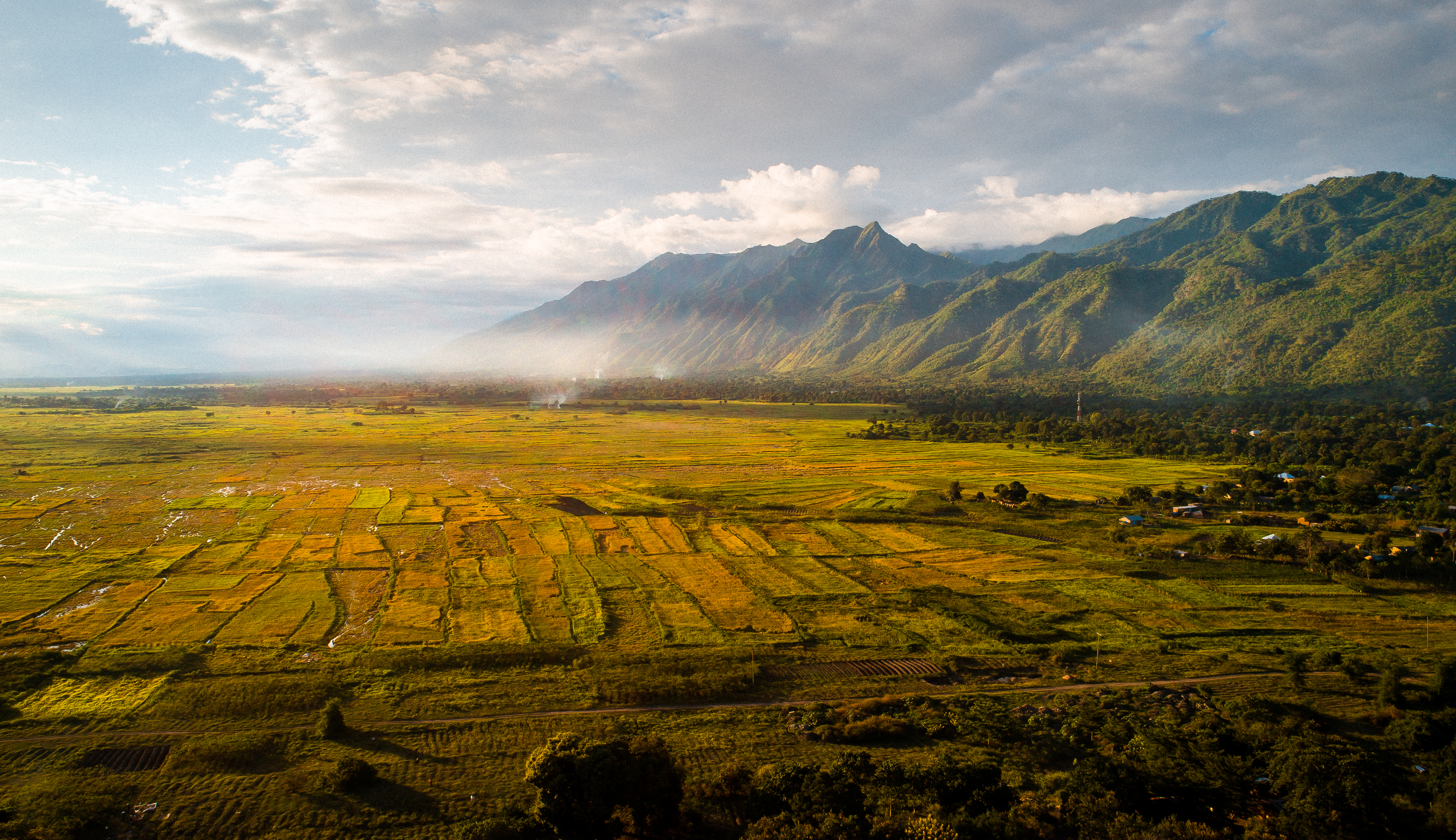
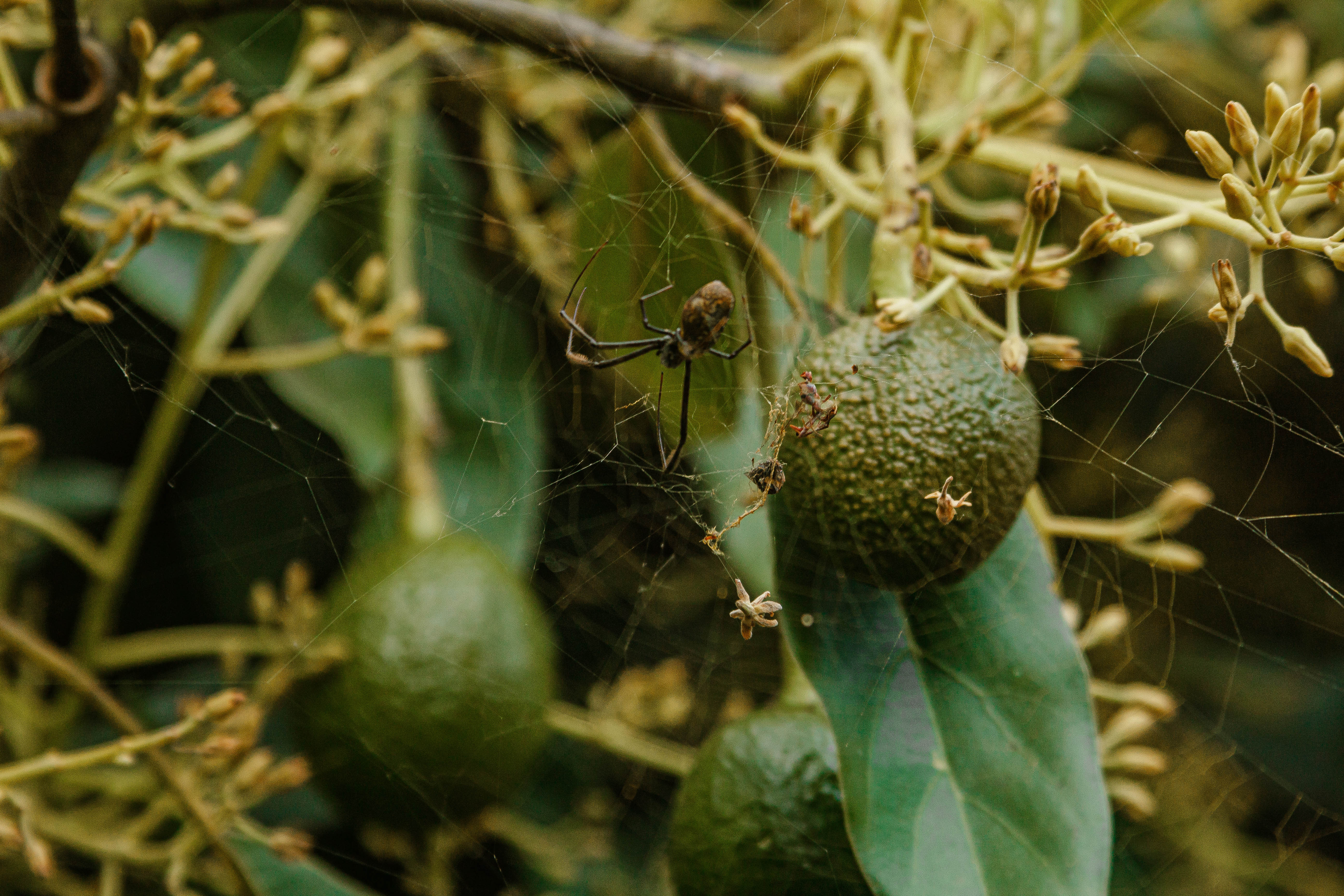
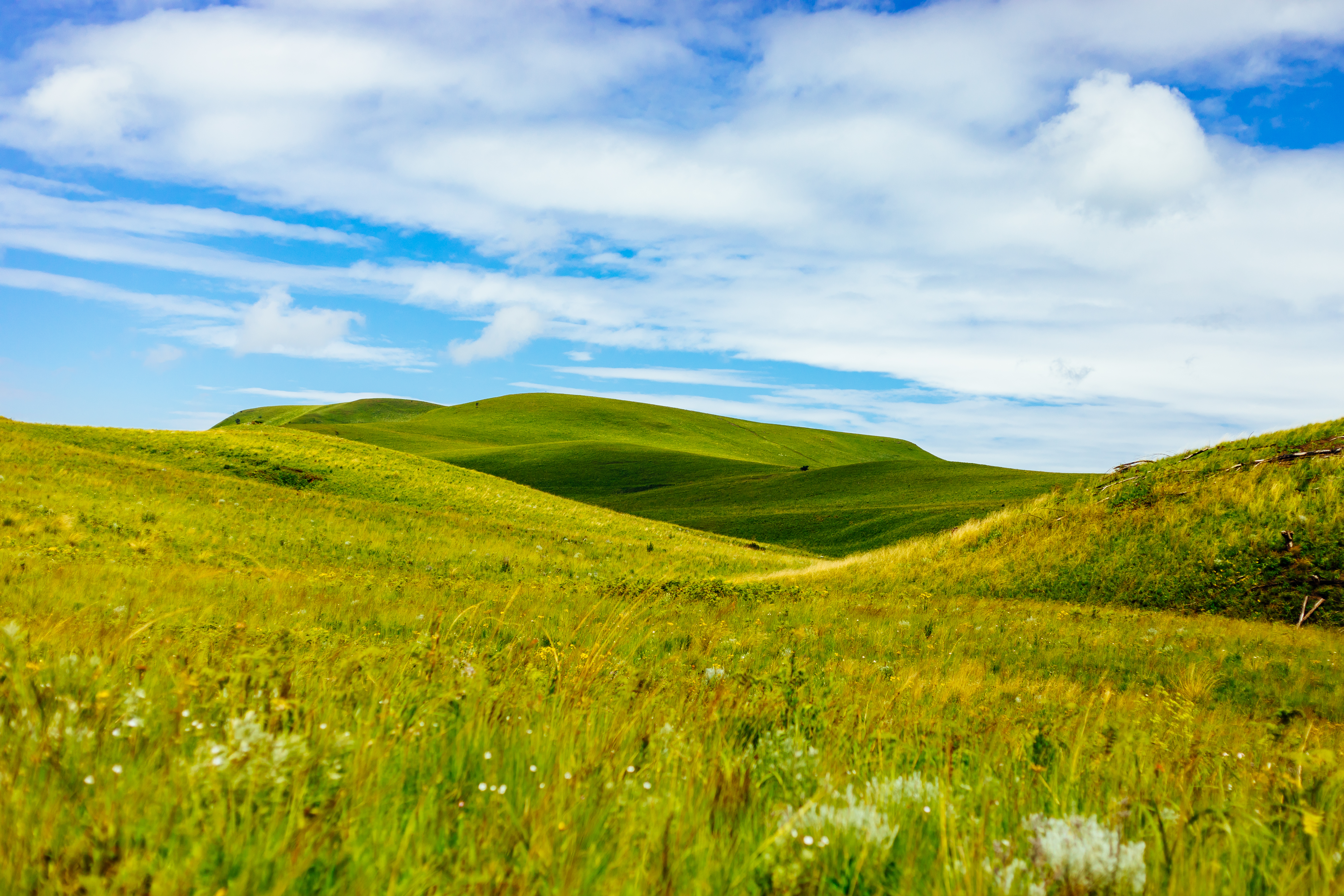
- From top to bottom: Kipengere Range in western Njombe, Avocados in Ludewa District and scene at Kitulo National Park
- Nicknames: The coolest part of Tanzania; The garden of the gods, The avocado region
- Location in Tanzania
- Coordinates: 9°31′5.16″S 34°41′8.52″E
- Country: Tanzania
- Zone: Southern Highlands
- Region: 2012
- Capital: Njombe
- Districts: List: Ludewa District; Makambako Town; Makete District; Njombe District; Njombe Town; Wanging'ombe District

Government
  - Regional Commissioner: Anthony Mtaka (CCM)

Area
  - Total: 21,347 km^{2} (8,242 sq mi)
  - Rank: 6th of 31
- Highest elevation (Mtorwi): 2,729 m (8,953 ft)

Population (2022)
  - Total: 889,946
  - Rank: 27th of 31
  - Density: 41.690/km^{2} (107.98/sq mi)
- Demonym: Njombean

Ethnic groups
  - Settler: Swahili, Hehe & Nyakyusa
  - Native: Bena, Pangwa, Kinga, Wanji, Mahanji, Poroto, Kisi, Mwelya, Sandia & Manda
- Time zone: UTC+3 (EAT)
- Postcode: 59xxx
- Area code: 026
- ISO 3166 code: TZ-29
- HDI (2021): 0.577 medium · 7th of 25
- Website: Official website
- Symbols of Tanzania
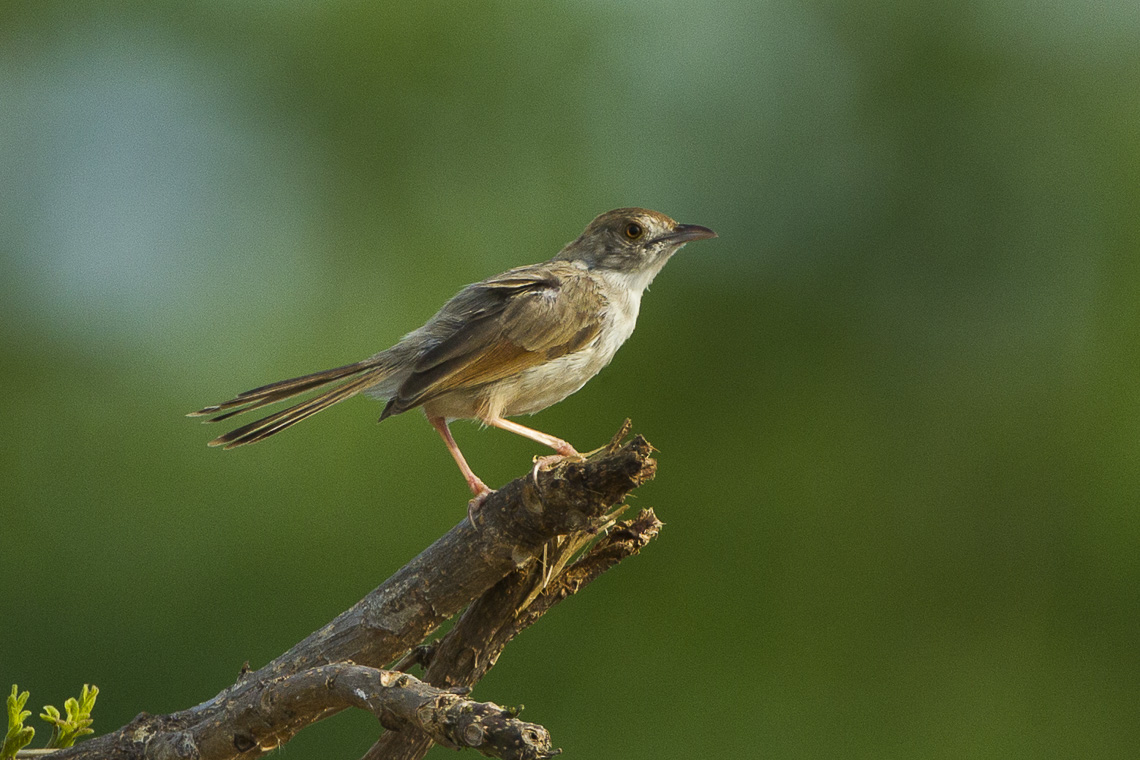
- Bird: churring cisticola

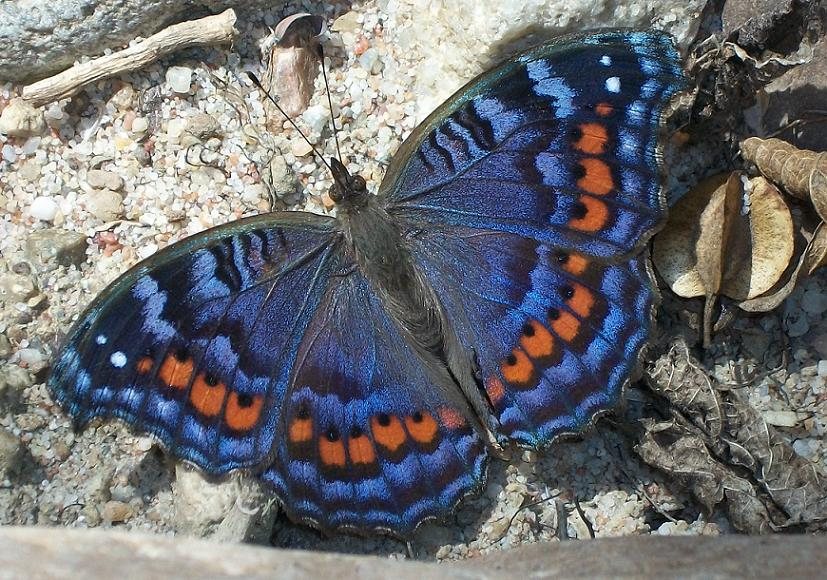
- Butterfly: Precis octavia

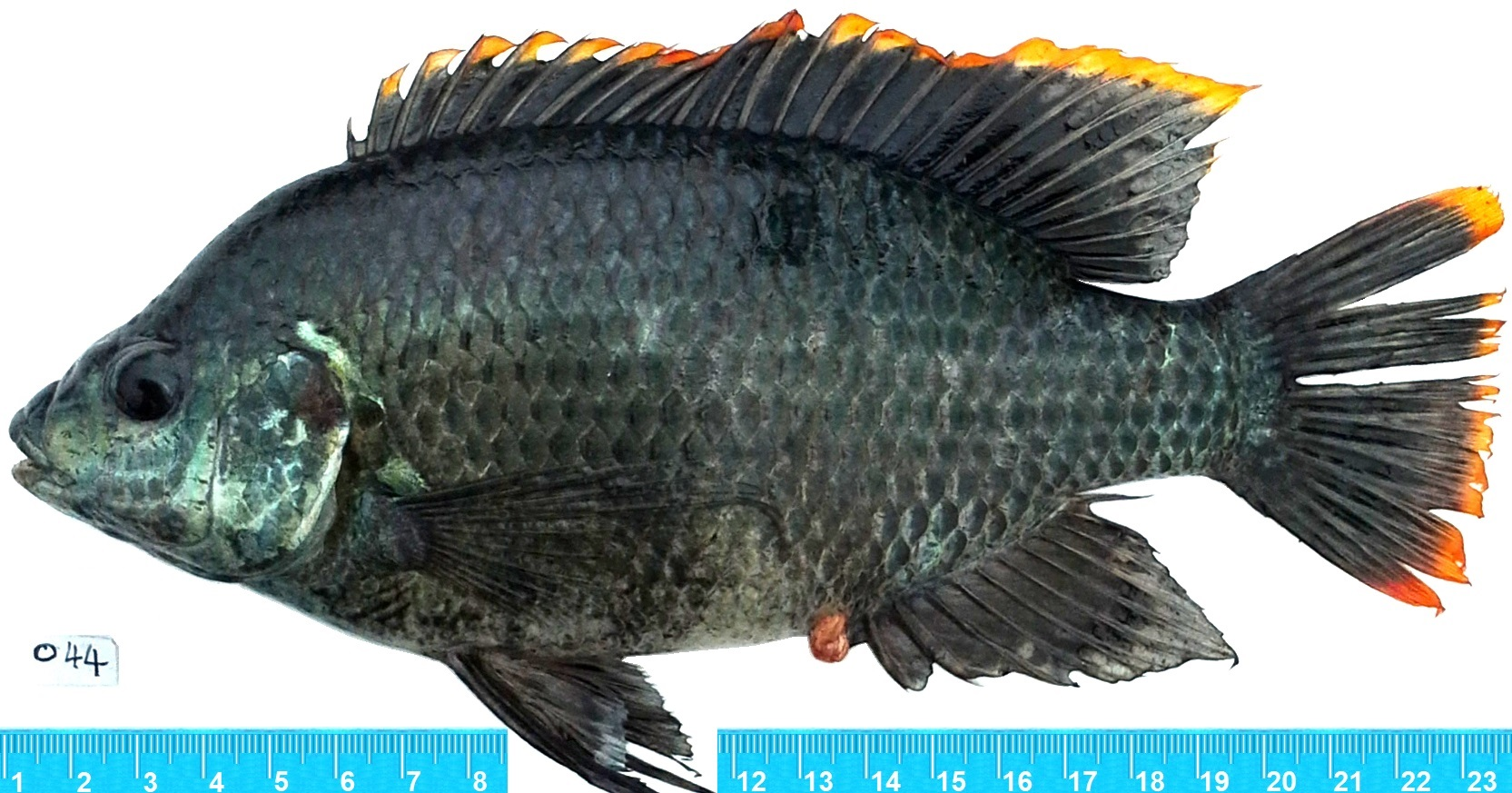
- Fish: Oreochromis variabilis

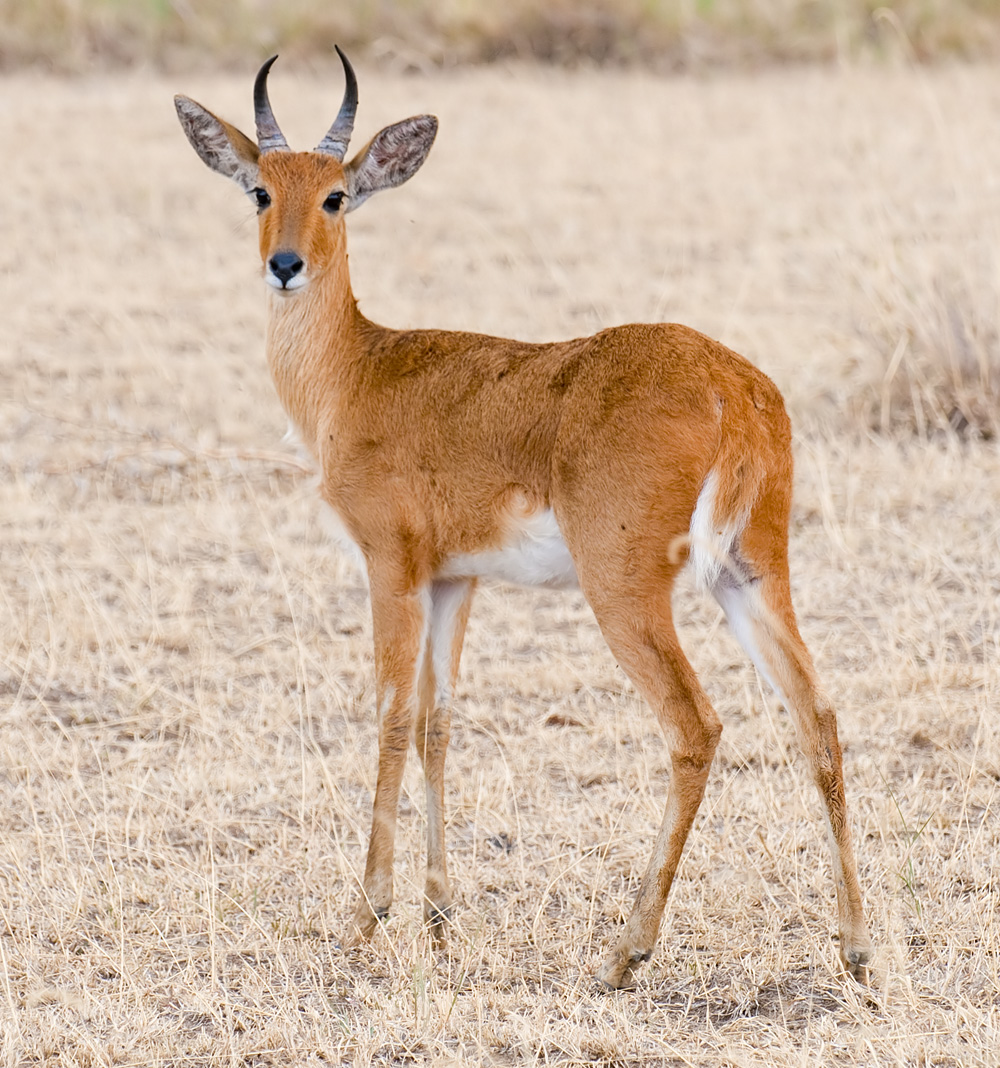
- Mammal: Reedbuck

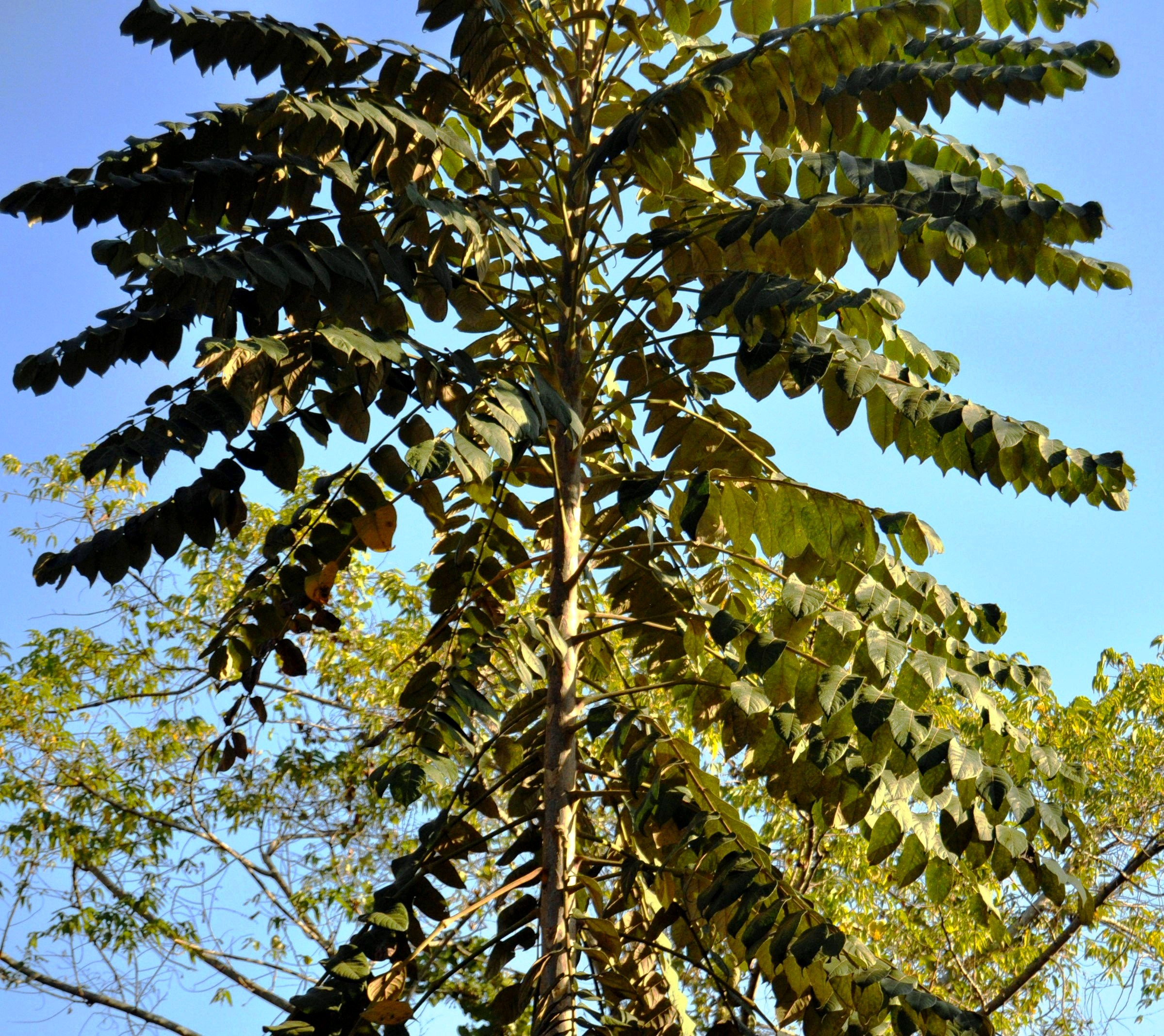
- Tree: Polyscias fulva

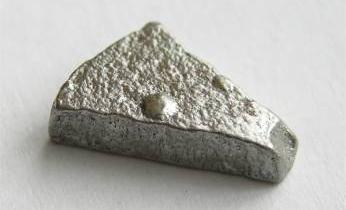
- Mineral: Iron

Njombe Region (Swahili: Mkoa wa Njombe) is one of Tanzania's 31 administrative regions which covers a land area of 21,347 km^{2} (8,242 sq mi). The region is comparable in size to the combined land area of the nation state of El Salvador. Njombe Region is bordered to the north by the Iringa Region and Mbeya Region, to the east by Morogoro Region, to the south by the Ruvuma Region and to the west by Lake Nyasa. The regional capital is the municipality of Njombe. According to the 2012 national census, the region had a population of 702,097.

== Etymology ==
The name Njombe originated from a name of a tree species called ‘Mdzombe’ for singular and Mazdombe for plural which then dominant in one of its localities known as Mdandu. And it was in Mdandu where the Germans chose to build an administrative and defence block; the Boma.

== Geography ==
The Njombe Region is situated in Tanzania's Southern Highlands Zone. It shares borders with the regions of Iringa to the north, Morogoro to the east, Mbeya to the west, Ruvuma to the south, and the Republic of Malawi to the north west via Lake Nyasa. The Njombe region has a total surface area of 24,994 square kilometers, of which 3,695 square kilometers (14.8 percent) are water from Lake Nyasa, and 21,299 square kilometers (85.2 percent) are land. The Njombe region occupies around 2.8 percent of the 881,300 km^{2}. of territory on the Tanzanian Mainland, making it the fifth-smallest region in terms of total area in the entire nation.

At the district level, Ludewa District Council has the most land (8,397 km^{2}, or 33.6%), with a land area of 6,325 km^{2} and a water area of 2,072 km^{2}. With a surface size of 5,800 km^{2}., Makete DC comes in second, followed by Wanging'ombe DC, which has 3,570 km^{2}. of territory. The Makambako Town Council recorded the least land area at 862 square kilometers, or 3.4 percent. Additionally, it was noted that the town councils of Njombe and Makambako do not have any water areas, although Ludewa DC (2,072 km^{2}) and Wanging'ombe DC both have tiny water areas (226 km^{2}.).

=== Climate ===
The Njombe Region, a part of Tanzania's Southern Highlands zone, has extensive rainy seasons and brief dry seasons, which are typically cool with moderate winds. The yearly total rainfall varies greatly geographically, seasonally, and annually, ranging from 600mm to 1,600mm. A single, very distinct rainy season that lasts from November through May is followed by a chilly, dry season that lasts from May to September. Depending on the altitude, the temperature in the area can range from 0 °C in May and June to roughly 20 °C to 24 °C in October and November. Furthermore, there can be significant temperature changes between day and night, with scorching afternoons reaching temperatures of up to 26 °C and chilly evenings and nights reaching temperatures of less than 0 °C.

=== Topography ===
The Njombe region is located on Tanzania's southern plateau, which rises from 600 to 3,000 meters above sea level. A significant scarp that can reach 800 meters in height, which is the eastern portion of the Kipengere Range, surrounds the area on all sides. Massive outcrops escarpments and metamorphic rocks are a notable aspect of the land escarpment in Makete and Ludewa DCs. These outcrops, also known as inselbergs, are the remains of old land surfaces that have been eroded to create a vast, gently undulating pen plain in the nearby areas. The Kipengere and Livingstone Mountains, which divide the Njombe and Mbeya areas in the west, are the dominant features of the area. The eastern arm of the Great Rift Valley, through which the tributaries of the Great Ruaha River flow, cuts across the northern parts of the region, leaving comparatively flat, high plains. The existence of a sizable plateau section, the area's common landform, adds to its distinctiveness. The Ruhuji, Hagafilo, Ruaha, Mbarali, and Ruhuhu are the only long-lasting, significant rivers in the area.

== Economy ==
The agricultural industry dominates the local economy of Njombe Region. Agriculture made up 42.3 percent of the economy in 2016, 48.4 percent in 2017, 47.4 percent in 2018, and 45.2 percent in 2019. The second-largest contributor to GDP, the services sector, generated 33.6 percent of it in 2016, 30 percent in 2017, 29.6 percent in 2018, and 32.6 percent in 2019. In each of the four years, the industry and construction sectors made up a smaller portion of the GDP. There is subsistence farming as well as commercial farming. The majority of the region's cash income in 2019 comes from the agriculture industry, primarily from the production of tea, beans, maize, groundnuts, potatoes, paddy, and sunflowers. Additionally, it contributes roughly 45.2% of the region's GDP.

=== Service sector ===
After agriculture, services are the second-most significant economic sector, accounting for around 32.6% of the region's GDP in 2019. The third largest economic contributor to the region's GDP is the industry and construction sector. In 2019, the sectors are predicted to contribute roughly 22.1% of the GDP. Of this more than half (73.5 percent) of all service jobs in the Njombe Region were in the education sector between 2016 and 2018. Agriculture and livestock are second with 4.3 percent of employment, followed by the health industry with 22 percent. With only 0.3% of the region's total employees working in the government, the natural resources sector had the lowest percentage of employees.

Makambako TC (26.6%) contributed the most to the region's GDP in 2016, followed by Njombe TC (24.8%) and Wanging'ombe DC (2.4%). (13.9 percent). The two districts that contributed the least to the region's GDP were Njombe (10.4%) and Makete (10.6 percent). From 2017 to 2019, the economic performance trend shifted, with Njombe TC having a large percentage of the region's GDP (27.7 percent in 2017, 26.6 percent in 2018, and 27.4 percent in 2019), followed by Makambako TC (24.4% in 2017, 24.8 percent in 2018, and 24.6 percent in 2019). On the other hand, Njombe DC's part of the GDP was extremely low during the course of the three years, while Makete DC's share was the lowest in 2019.

=== Wealth Distribution ===
The district with the greatest poverty rate was Ludewa DC, with 29.5 percent of its residents living below the poverty line for basic requirements, according to the 2012 Region and District Poverty Estimates for Tanzania Report. In the councils of Wanging'ombe DC and Njombe DC, respectively, 28.7 and 26.4 percent of the populace were living in poverty. Njombe TC, which had 16.1% of its population below the poverty line for basic requirements, and Makambako TC, which had 23.5 percent, were the two districts with the lowest percentages of people living poverty. The worst district in the Njombe region in terms of the rate of poverty gap was Ludewa, with 6.9 percent, followed by Wanging'ombe DC and Njombe DC, with 6.4 and 5.8 percent, respectively. Makete DC, which was leading in the Njombe region's unequal wealth distribution with 30.7 percent, was closely followed by Njombe TC, which had 30.2 percent, and Ludewa DC, which had 29.3 percent.

=== Wildlife, Tourism and Reserves ===
The overall forest area in the Njombe region is 332,086.6 ha, or 13.3 percent of the region's total land area of 2,499,400 ha. With 132,129.5 ha, Wanging'ombe DC has the most forest cover, followed by Njombe DC (40,530.6 ha), and Makete DC (58,155 ha). Njombe region is home to the Kitulo National Park. Nyumba Nitu forest, meaning a Black house, consists of natural caves and a natural forest located at Mlevela village in Mdandu ward, approximately 15 kilometers away from Njombe Township. The forest has its root from Nyumba Nitu caves, since the caves are very dark for one to see and they are associated by the myth of black cows which lived in the cave. Inside the caves, local Wabena people hid or took refugee during tribal wars between rival Wahehe fighters during Chief Mkwawa conquests in Iringa Region, back in last quarter of 19th century. The caves also provided safe hideout from German forces during the Maji Maji uprising.

“Lwivala Stone”, or Glittering stone, the slab-rock has a feature similar to a map of Africa. It is located in Lwivala natural forest which local communities perform rituals and traditional ceremonies. The7.5-acre rock is grown with short grass with glittering outgrows during rainy season. There are some unreadable inscriptions which, according to local legend, appeared naturally. It is located in Igodiva village, about three kilometres from Nyumba Nitu forest. Luhuji waterfall in Njombe town is a tourist attraction, used for filming and picnics.

Old colonial buildings including a Catholic Cathedral and a Lutheran church are located in Njombe town. A memorial monument to honour Tanzanians who fought the Second World War is found in Njombe. This bears inscriptions of the veterans who fought under the command of King's African Rifles (KAR) of the British Army. An early German built Primary Magistrate's Court and a German administrative block are historical sites found in Njombe Township. A mass grave of the local Wabena warriors killed during the Maji Maji war in 1906 is found in Utengule village. The mass grave bears hundreds of remains of the fallen warriors who were slaughtered by German colonial forces.

=== Infrastructure ===
The region of Njombe has a total of 6,403.49 kilometers of roads. Trunk roads made up 6.1 percent of the regional network, regional roads 12.45 percent, and district roads made up a total of 81.45 percent of the network (Paved roads 0.52, Gravel 19.93 and Earth 60.8). Wanging'ombe (1,305.07 kilometers), Ludewa DC (1,369.35 kilometers), Njombe TC (1,359.19 kilometers), Makete DC (946.9 kilometers), Njombe DC (724.07 kilometers), and Makambako TC make up the region's total 6,403.49 kilometers of highways (698.91 kilometers).In the Njombe region, 3.29.43 kilometers, or 5.14 percent of the entire regional road network, are made of tarmac (Figure 4.1). 2,180.93 kilometers, or 34.06 percent, of the network are made up of gravel roads, while 3,893.13 kilometers, or 60.8 percent, are made up of the Earth Road Network.

Since there is a strong correlation between road worthiness and tarmac/gravel surface, it can be said that 39.2 percent of the region's road network is usable throughout the year, especially during the rainy season. Tarmac and gravel roads made up 39.20 percent of the network. The length of the tarmac and gravel road network is 606.63 kilometers in Makete DC, followed by 563.8 kilometers in Ludewa DC, 463.41 kilometers in Wanging'ombe DC, 425.07 kilometers in Njombe TC, 328.01 kilometers in Njombe DC, and 123.44 kilometers in Makambako TC.

The TAZARA railway line, which runs through Makambako Station in Makambako Ward and Utiga in Wanging'ombe Ward, serves the Njombe region and travels to Mbeya and New Kapiri Mposhi . These two railroad stations act as a hub for transporting large commodities and services to the area. There are just two aerodromes in the area that cater to air passengers. The two small airports are at Njombe TC and Wanging'ombe DC, respectively, but due to the lack of regular flights, there is no information on passengers boarding and disembarking at either location. Their earth-surfaced airstrips can only accommodate tiny aircraft or charter flights.

The Njombe region has 349 landline telephone services, no TV stations, 8 radio stations, 7 internet cafés, 6 mobile phone providers, four post offices, and three sub-post offices, according to information received from the six District Councils.

A total of 293 villages/mitaas out of 463 have been connected to electricity services through TANESCO, which is equivalent to 63.3 percent of the region's villages/mitaas. The least connected council in the region is Makete, with only 31.2 percent of its villages having power. Makambako TC is leading in the region with roughly 85.3 percent of its villages/mitaa connected.

== Population ==
The Njombe Region is the ancestral homeland to the following people groups: Bena, Pangwa, Kinga, Wanji, Poroto, Kisi, Mwelya, Sandia and Manda. The majority of the District is populated by the Bena ethnic group, while the majority of the Ludewa DC is made up of Pangwa, Manda, and Kisi. Wanji ethnic group is only present in Makete DC, while Ngoni and Nyakyusa make up the majority of Njombe TC and Makete DC.

=== Demographic ===
According to the 2012 population census, there are 702,097 people living in the Region, with women making up 53.1% of that total population (or 372,738) and men making up 46.9% (329,359).The number of residents in the region increased significantly by 49,052 individuals between the 2002 and 2012 censuses, from 653,045 to 702,097, or 7.5%, according to the 2012 Population Census. The region had 1.6 percent of Tanzania's Mainland's overall population of 43,625,354 in 2012. From 2002 to 2012, the population of the Njombe region increased by 7.5%, but the rate of growth differed at the council level. Makambako experienced the highest growth, at 35.9%, followed by Njombe TC (14.6%) and Wanging'ombe DC (6.3 percent). Njombe DC (4.0%) and Ludewa DC (4.0%) (1.9 percent). A distinct picture emerges from the council population growth between 2002 and 2012, with Makete DC experiencing negative growth (-8.0 percent). The region's two most densely inhabited district councils in 2012 were Makambako TC (109 people per square kilometer) and Wanging'ombe DC (48 people per square kilometer).

== Administrative divisions ==
=== Districts ===
Njombe Region is divided into six districts, each administered by a council:

Districts of Njombe Region
District	Population (2012 Census)
Ludewa District	133,218
Makambako Town	93,827
Makete District	97,266
Njombe District	85,747
Njombe Town	130,223
Wanging'ombe District	161,816
Total	702,097

== Health and Education ==
=== Health ===
New health facilities are still being built in Njombe Region in an effort to improve the health care system. The number of institutions expanded from 3 in 1961 to 146 in 2003 (10 hospitals, 19 health centers, and 117 dispensaries), 241 in 2012 (10 hospitals, 22 health centers, and 209 dispensaries), and 273 in 2018 (10 hospitals, 33 health centers, and 230 dispensaries). The most dispensaries are found in Njombe Town Council (59). The least number of dispensaries were located in Makambako Town Council (7). Similarly, Njombe Town Council had the most health centers (9) compared to Makambako Town Council, which had the least (3). The most hospitals were located in the district councils of Makete and Ludewa (3 each).

The number of health facilities in the Region increased from 237 in 2015 to 273 in 2018, an increase of 36 establishments (69.2 percent). From 183 in 2015 to 211 in 2018, the number of publicly owned health facilities increased by 28 facilities (15.3 percent). From 27 in 2015 to 42 in 2018, Makete District Council saw the most increase in the number of public health facilities. Unusual tendency led to a reduction of three and four public health facilities in the Ludewa and Makambako Councils, respectively. From 54 in 2015 to 62 in 2018, the region's private healthcare facilities saw an increase of eight (14.8%). From 11 in 2015 to 18 in 2018, Njombe Town Council saw the largest rise in the number of private health facilities by 7 (63.6 percent).

=== Morbidity ===
The Region's leading cause of morbidity for outpatients in 2016 was upper respiratory infections. Urinary tract infections came in third, followed by malaria. Intestinal worms and pneumonia were the fourth and fifth illnesses, respectively. In Njombe Region in 2016, malaria was the most common illness among inpatients, followed by pneumonia, urinary tract infections, diarrhea, and hypertension. In 2018, different observations were made regarding in-patients. For patients in the region, pneumonia was the most common ailment. Hypertension, peptic ulcers, HIV infection, and typhoid fever were the second, third, fourth, and fifth diseases, respectively.

The data that are currently available do not accurately depict the mortality rate in the Njombe Region. But according to the medical records, pneumonia was the leading cause of death for inpatients of all ages in 2016.Pneumonia accounted for 198 (21.7%) of the 911 recorded deaths in 2016, followed by clinical AIDS (20.5%), acute respiratory infections (ARI) (13.8%), specified symptoms (13.2%), and severe malaria (9.9 percent). Diarrhoea, non-infectious illnesses, TB, and simple malaria were among the other illnesses. Acute respiratory infections (ARI) (12.2 percent), severe malaria (29.4 percent), diarrhoea (6.6 percent), and anemia were the top five causes of death for inpatients of all ages in 2018. (4.5 percent). Fractures, clinical AIDS, burns, poisoning, and other diagnoses were among the other ailments.

=== Primary Education ===
Out of the 503 elementary schools in the Region as of 2018, 483 (96.0%) were owned by the government, while 20 (4.0%) were privately held. From 497 in 2016 to 503 in 2018, the region's primary school enrollment increased by six schools (1.2%). Only Njombe TC and Wanging'ombe DC saw a rise in the number of primary schools. Ludewa DC (110 schools, 21.9%) led the Region in the number of primary schools at the Council level in 2018. Makete DC (103 schools, 20.5 percent) and Wanging'ombe DC (109 schools, 21.9 percent) came in second and third, respectively. In 2018 in the Region, Makambako Town Council has the fewest number of primary schools (40 schools, 8.0%). As the region included 463 villages and 483 public/government operated primary schools in 2018, there was an average of one primary school per village. The average number of primary schools per village varied between Ludewa and Makambako, with 1.4 being the highest average number (0.6).

=== Primary Performance ===
17,832 students (79.5%) of the 22,431 students enrolled in standard one in 2011 finished standard seven in 2017. In 2017, more girls than boys (9,509, 53.3%) completed primary education (8,323, 46.7%). Njombe Town Council had the highest completion rate, at 87.8%, while Makambako Town Council had the lowest, at 61.2 percent, along with the differences seen among councils. When compared to 2017, when the completion rate was 79.5 percent, primary schools performed somewhat better in 2018 with a completion rate of 79.7 percent (Table 5.28a) (Table 5.29). Moreover, the completion rate for girls was greater in 2017 (84.0%) than in 2018 (85.2%). Table 5.28a at the council level reveals that in 2018, Makambako Town Council had the lowest completion rate at 74.9 percent, while Njombe District Council had the highest at 83.0 percent. Makambako Town Council had the most school dropouts at the council level (181), followed by Wanging'ombe DC (144) and Makete DC (127). The least number of dropouts occurred in Ludewa DC (9). In 2018, Makete DC had the most dropouts (189), followed by Makambako (152) and Wanging'ombe (152). (60). The least number of dropouts occurred in Njombe DC (28).

=== Secondary Education ===
There were just three public high schools in the area in the 1970s. However, there were now 114 secondary schools. There were 116 secondary schools in operation in 2018.11,882 students took the PSLE (Primary leaving exams) in total, and 98.9% of them were accepted into the region's Form One schools (Table 5.31). The similar thing occurred in 2018, when all 13,735 PSLE-passing students entered form 1.

=== Secondary Performance ===
In 2016 and 2018, more than 98 percent of students passed the Form VI exam. At the district level, the Makete district excelled, achieving 100% in both 2016 and 2018. Since all district councils in the Njombe Region achieved a pass rate of at least 97 percent over the course of two years, overall Form VI performance was good.Boys performed better than girls in terms of performance in 2014, with 73 percent of boys passing exams compared to 67.4 percent of girls, whereas in 2018, both boys and girls passed exams equally (83 percent). At the district level, Njombe TC had the highest performance in 2014 with a pass rate of 76.5 percent, and Wanging'ombe DC had the best performance in 2018 with an 89.3 pass percentage. And Ludewa DC had the poorest results, with pass rates of 58.4% in 2014 and 74.6 percent in 2018.

=== Higher Education ===
There were 26 vocational training centers in the region as of 2018, and they were spread over Makambako TC, Njombe TC, Wanging'ombe DC, Makete DC, Ludewa DC, and Njombe DC. Automobile mechanics, auto electrical installation, agricultural and animal husbandry, carpentry, tailoring, masonry, and driving are among the courses provided.
