= Masaguro =

- Village
- Location in Tanzania
- Coordinates: 10°34′S 36°15′E
- Country: Tanzania
- Region: Ruvuma Region
- District: Songea
- Time zone: UTC+3 (EAT)

Masaguro is a village in the Ruvuma Region of southwestern Tanzania. It is located along the A19 road, to the southeast of Namtumbo and northwest of Mchomolo.
