= Liparamba Game Reserve =

Protected wildlife area in the Ruvuma region of Tanzania

- IUCN category IV (habitat/species management area)
- Location within Tanzania
- Location: Mbinga, Songea & Nyasa Districts of Ruvuma Region, Tanzania
- Nearest city: Songea
- Coordinates: 11°27′0″S 35°12′0″E
- Area: 571 km^{2} (220 mi^{2})
- Designation: Game Reserve
- Established: 2006
- Named for: Klipspringer in Kimatengo
- Governing body: Tanzania Wildlife Management Authority (TAWA) under the Ministry of Natural Resources and Tourism
- Website: Official Page

The Liparamba Game Reserve (Hifadhi ya Akiba ya Liparamba, In Swahili) is a protected area located in the Mbinga, Songea & Nyasa Districts of the Ruvuma Region of Tanzania that covers an area of 571 km^{2} (220 sq mi). The Liparamba Game Reserve was established by Government Notice Number 289 of the year 2000. Following designation, Mbinga District Council managed it until 2006, when Director of Wildlife at Tanzania Wildlife Management Authority (TAWA) took over its management.

== Etymology ==
The Klipspringer antelope is referred to in the Matengo language as Liparamba.

== Attractions ==
Elephant herds traveling from the Selous Game Reserve in Northern Ruvuma Region to the Niassa Reserve in Mozambique use the large Ruvuma River as a route through the Liparamba Game Reserve. The main attraction of the region is seeing the large elephant herds, and the Ruvuma riverbanks offer prime viewing of this wildlife display. The Ruvuma River is encircled by primarily swampy landscapes, riparian forests, and Miombo woodlands, which serve as an ideal natural home for hippo, basks of crocodiles, zebra, lions, leopards, wild cats, colobus monkeys and African otters.
