= Nahoro =

- Village
- Location in Tanzania
- Coordinates: 10°33′10″S 36°4′20″E
- Country: Tanzania
- Region: Ruvuma Region
- District: Songea
- Time zone: UTC+3 (EAT)

Nahoro is a village in the Ruvuma Region of southwestern Tanzania. It is located along the A19 road, to the east of Njuga and southwest of Namtumbo.
