= Mata Mondo =

- Village
- Location in Tanzania
- Coordinates: 10°42′0″S 35°22′59″E
- Country: Tanzania
- Region: Ruvuma Region
- Time zone: UTC+3 (EAT)

Mata Mondo is a village in the Ruvuma Region of southwestern Tanzania. It is located along the A19 road, to the east of Kitai and west of Likuyufusi.
