= Njuga =

- Village
- Location in Tanzania
- Coordinates: 10°33′S 35°55′E
- Country: Tanzania
- Region: Ruvuma Region
- District: Songea
- Time zone: UTC+3 (EAT)

Njuga is a village in the Ruvuma Region of southwestern Tanzania. It is located along the A19 road, to the east of Mlete and west of Nahoro.
