= Mchomolo =

- Village
- Location in Tanzania
- Coordinates: 10°35′3″S 36°20′3″E
- Country: Tanzania
- Region: Ruvuma Region
- District: Songea
- Time zone: UTC+3 (EAT)

Mchomolo is a village in the Ruvuma Region of southwestern Tanzania. It is located along the A19 road, to the southeast of Masaguro.
