= Lilambo =

- Village
- Location in Tanzania
- Coordinates: 10°40′59″S 35°32′57″E
- Country: Tanzania
- Region: Ruvuma Region
- Time zone: UTC+3 (EAT)
- Area code: 025

Lilambo is a village in the Ruvuma Region of southwestern Tanzania. It is located along the A19 road, to the east of Likuyufusi and west of Songea.
