= Ndengo =

- Village
- Country: Tanzania
- Region: Ruvuma Region
- Time zone: UTC+3 (EAT)

Ndengo is a village in the Ruvuma Region of southwestern Tanzania. It is located along the A19 road, north of Nyoni and south of Mbinga.
