= Kawawa =

Kawawa may refer to:

- Rashidi Kawawa (1926–2009), Prime Minister of Tanganyika in 1962 and of Tanzania in 1972 to 1977
- Shudo Kawawa (born 1965), Japanese swimmer
- Sofia Kawawa (née Selemani Mkwela, 1936–1994), Tanzanian activist, founder of the Tanzania Women's Union
- Vita Kawawa (born 1964), Tanzanian politician and Member of Parliament
