= Mbinga =

Mbinga Mbinga Mjini
- Town and ward
- Location in Tanzania
- Coordinates: 10°56′28″S 35°0′0″E
- Country: Tanzania
- Region: Ruvuma Region
- District: Mbinga District

Area
  - Town and ward: 24.48 sq mi (63.41 km^{2})

Population (2012 census)
  - Town and ward: 37,893
  - Density: 1,548/sq mi (597.6/km^{2})
  - Urban: 35,000
- Time zone: UTC+3 (EAT)

Mbinga is a town and ward in the Ruvuma Region of southwestern Tanzania. It is located along the A19 road, to the northeast of Ndengo and southwest of Kigonsera.
