= Likonde, Tanzania =

Likonde mkako
- Village
- Location in Tanzania
- Coordinates: 10°45′59″S 35°7′0″E
- Country: Tanzania
- Region: Ruvuma Region
- District: Mbinga District
- Time zone: UTC+3 (EAT)

Likonde is a small village in the Ruvuma Region of southwestern Tanzania. It is located along the A19 road, to the northeast of Kigonsera.
