= Kigonsera =

- Village
- Location in Tanzania
- Coordinates: 10°48′S 35°4′E
- Country: Tanzania
- Region: Ruvuma Region
- District: Mbinga District

Population (2024)
  - Total: 10,275
- Time zone: UTC+3 (EAT)

Kigonsera is a village in the Ruvuma Region of southwestern Tanzania. It is located along the A19 road, to the northeast of Mbinga and to the southwest of Likonde.
