= Kitai, Tanzania =

Kitai
- Village
- Location in Tanzania
- Coordinates: 10°42′57″S 35°11′45″E
- Country: Tanzania
- Region: Ruvuma Region
- Time zone: UTC+3 (EAT)

Kitai is a village in the Ruvuma Region of southwestern Tanzania. It is located along the A19 road, to the northeast of Kigonsera and Likonde. It is a notable mining location.
