= Matemanga =

- Village and ward
- Location in Tanzania
- Coordinates: 10°45′S 37°0′E
- Country: Tanzania
- Region: Ruvuma Region
- District: Tunduru
- Time zone: UTC+3 (EAT)

Matemanga is a village and ward in the Ruvuma Region of southern-central Tanzania. It is located along the A19 road, to the northwest of Tabora.
