= Nyoni, Tanzania =

Ward in Mbinga, Ruvuma, Tanzania

Nyoni Kata ya Nyoni
- Ward
- Location within Tanzania
- Coordinates: 11.085974°S 34.9195717°E
- Country: Tanzania
- Region: Ruvuma Region
- District: Mbinga District
- Ward: Nyoni

Population (2016)
  - Total: 11,885
- Time zone: UTC+3 (EAT)

Nyoni is a ward in Mbinga District the Ruvuma Region of the Tanzanian Southern Highlands. It is located along the A19 road.

In 2016, the Tanzania National Bureau of Statistics report there were 11,885 people in the ward; this is up from a population of 10,918 in 2012.
