= Sofia Kawawa =

Tanzanian women's union activist (1936–1994)

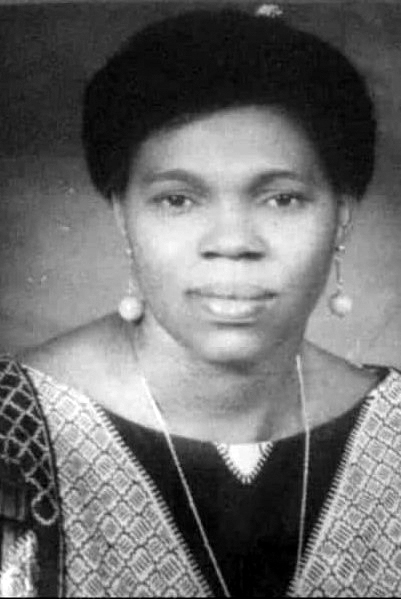
- Sofia Kawawa

2nd Chairwoman Union of Women of Tanzania
- In office 15 May 1980 – 18 April 1990

Personal details
- Born: 12 August 1936 Masonya Village, Tunduru, Ruvuma
- Died: 11 February 1994 (aged 57) Moshi, Kilimanjaro, Tanzania
- Resting place: Madale Dar es Salaam
- Party: TANU, CCM
- Spouse: Rashid Kawawa (m. 1951)
- Children: 8,including Vita Kawawa
- Occupation: Activist/politician

Sofia Kawawa (née Selemani Mkwela, 12 August 1936 – 1994) was one of the co-founders of the Tanzania Women's Union (UWT). She was a member of the Tanganyika African National Union (TANU) party and later Chama Cha Mapinduzi (CCM).

== Early life ==
Sofia Kawawa was born on August 12, 1936, in the southern Masonya village, which was part of the Tunduru District in the Ruvuma region. Kawawa’s parents enrolled her in primary school; after her father died, her brother paid her school fees. She completed her education at Tabora Girls School in 1950. The next year, at 15, she married Rashidi Mfaume Kawawa, who later became the first Prime Minister of Tanzania.

Kawawa became a prominent figure in the fight for gender equality because colonial misogyny defined her early life. The British colonial education system focused on boys’ education at the expense of girls’, and the imbalance was heavily entrenched in Tanzanian society. Very few girls were able to attain an education, and Kawawa’s family was privileged to send her to school. Colonial ideas about gender marginalized women, especially in employment, because they emphasized rural women performing domestic and agricultural labor. Careers for women were scarce, and without an education, most remained trapped in agricultural work. This was the case with Kawawa’s mother, who was restricted to agricultural work by colonial policies. Kawawa used her marriage and education to advance her social status and champion women’s rights.

== Political career ==
By 1964, Tanganyika and Zanzibar declared independence and unified to form Tanzania. Organized discontent within the colonies played a large part in dismantling colonial structures. In 1955, Kawawa joined the Tanganyika African National Union (TANU) before her husband and became one of the first women in the party. The women of TANU used their shared identities to strengthen the party. They transformed small community groups into political action networks through which they could exchange information, attend rallies and marches, and fundraise. These groups were especially important in rural areas, which were more difficult to unify. Compared to her husband, whose involvement in trade unions allowed him access to politics, Kawawa did not have a large official role in the independence movement. Colonial mentalities about women’s places in society persisted. Despite their contributions to TANU’s strength and popularity, Kawawa and other women were expected to fulfill traditional feminine roles.

With Bibi Titi Mohamed, Kawawa helped found the Tanzania Women’s Union (UWT) in 1962 to fight for inclusion in ujamaa. The socialist ideology was based on an idealized view of a pre-colonial, self-reliant Africa, but in practice, it emphasized Western, disconnected nuclear families. After decolonization, women faced largely the same discrimination in society. They were expected to be devoted to motherhood by giving birth to sons who would usher in social development, rather than to be agents of change. Kawawa had already shown her ability to unify rural and urban women through TANU, and she sought to create the UWT to make politics more accessible to women. Organizations aimed solely at women were the most visible forms of political mobilization, and tended to focus on literacy, health, financial stability, and hygiene. Female activists used the societal emphasis on motherhood to gain more members by comparing reproductive power to the political power TANU and UWT membership held. Women in TANU, including Kawawa and Mwasaburi Ali, used the saying “all people are equal” to fight for women's right to autonomy and self-determination. TANU women stated that equality and non-discrimination were essential to personhood and nationhood and highlighted the opportunities now available to the daughters and granddaughters under TANU leadership.

Kawawa’s position as the wife of a high-profile politician allowed her to enter politics more easily. The emphasis on motherhood had an especially significant impact given that women needed enough power to break through male-dominated careers. Women often put aside their professional goals to take care of children and the home, while men were able to leave and financially support the family. Kawawa succeeded Bibi Titi as chairman of the UWT in 1967 and established herself as a strong advocate for women’s rights. She fought for more equitable access to education for girls and adults and paid maternity leave for all working women, and criticized Islamic rules such as polygamy. Tanzanian women supported Kawawa as chairman until 1990. Kawawa redefined the role of women in Tanzanian society through the UWT and sought to improve the lives of girls through social development.

Mama Kawawa and other activists had a slogan saying "It must be from the grassroots stems". She campaigned for women to be leaders. She helped Anna Abdallah and Gertrude Mongella become members of parliament.
