= Ndendeule people =

Ethnic group from Ruvuma Region of Tanzania

The Ndendeule are an ethnic group in Namtumbo District, Ruvuma Region, Tanzania, who speak the Ndendeule language. In 2000 the Ndendeule population was estimated to number 100,000.

The Ndendeule mainly practice Christianity or Islam.
