= Ndwewe language =

Bantu language spoken in Tanzania

Ndwewe
- Native to: Tanzania
- Region: Ruvuma
- Ethnicity: Ndwewe (ethnically Ngindo)
- Native speakers: 30,000 (2021)
- Language family: Niger–Congo?: Atlantic–Congo; Benue–Congo; Bantoid; Bantu; Rufiji–Ruvuma; Mbinga; Lwegu; Ndwewe

Language codes
- ISO 639-3: nww
- Glottolog: ndwe1234

Ndwewe is an endangered Bantu language of Tanzania.
