= Kitai =

Kitai may refer to:

- Kitai, Tanzania
- Kitay-gorod, a part of central Moscow formerly within the city walls
- Kitai Raige, a character in the movie After Earth
- Kitai, another name for Qitai, a city in Xinjiang Province, China
- Kitai, a Japanese term for airframe used before 1945 by the Japanese army; see Japanese military aircraft designation systems § Short designation ("Ki" number)
- An alternative form of Cathay in several languages, as an exonym for China
- Kitai (band), a Spanish band

== People ==
- Davidi Kitai, Belgian professional poker player
- Kazuo Kitai, Japanese photographer
- Yuki Kitai, Japanese footballer
- Yuko Kitai, Japanese dressage rider

== See also ==
- Kitay (disambiguation)
