= Mchesi =

Rural ward in Ruvuma, Tanzania

- Ward
- Location within Tanzania
- Coordinates: 11°23′03″S 37°21′38″E
- Country: Tanzania
- Region: Ruvuma
- District: Tunduru

Area
  - Total: 553.2 km^{2} (213.6 sq mi)
- Elevation: 395 m (1,296 ft)

Population (2012)
  - Total: 8,781
  - Density: 15.87/km^{2} (41.11/sq mi)
- Time zone: UTC+3 (EAT)

Mchesi is a rural ward of Tunduru District in Ruvuma Region, Tanzania. It is located on the northern shore of Ruvuma River, at an average elevation of 395 meters above the sea level. According to the census held in 2012, it had a population of 8,781.
