= Likuyufusi =

- Village
- Location in Tanzania
- Coordinates: 10°40′49″S 35°29′15″E
- Country: Tanzania
- Region: Ruvuma Region
- Time zone: UTC+3 (EAT)

Likuyufusi is a village in the Ruvuma Region of Southwestern Tanzania. It is located along the A19 road, to the east of Sinai Village and west of Lilambo.
