= Oyster Bay Range Front Lighthouse =

- Location: Oyster Bay; Dar es Salaam; Tanzania
- Coordinates: 6°46′57.6″S 39°17′12.3″E

Tower
- Construction: concrete tower
- Height: 9 metres (30 ft)
- Shape: cylindrical tower with balcony and lantern
- Markings: white tower
- Operator: Tanzania Ports Authority

Light
- Focal height: 20 metres (66 ft)
- Range: 12 nautical miles (22 km; 14 mi)
- Characteristic: Q W

The Oyster Bay Range Front Lighthouse is located on the coast of Dar es salaam, Tanzania in Oyster Bay. The lighthouse works in conjunction with the Oyster Bay Rear Range Lighthouse to warn ships away from the cliffs at the Msasani peninsula.

The tower is a white cylindrical tower with one red white strip facing the ocean. The lighthouse has a small 1 story equipment room adjacent to the tower.

== See also ==
- List of lighthouses in Tanzania
