= Nindi language =

Bantu language of Tanzania

Nindi
- Native to: Tanzania
- Region: Ruvuma
- Native speakers: 5,700 (2009)
- Language family: Niger–Congo?: Atlantic–Congo; Benue–Congo; Bantoid; Bantu; Rufiji–Ruvuma; Mbinga?; Nindi

Language codes
- ISO 639-3: nxi
- Glottolog: nind1242
- Guthrie code: N.102

Nindi is a minor Bantu language of Tanzania. Classified as Bantu N.10 by Guthrie and said to be close to Ndendeule, it is presumably one of the Rufiji–Ruvuma languages with the rest of the N.10 group.
