= Oyster Bay Rear Range Lighthouse =

- Location: Oyster Bay; Dar es Salaam; Tanzania
- Coordinates: 6°47′02.0″S 39°17′2.5″E

Tower
- Construction: stone tower
- Height: 26 metres (85 ft)
- Shape: square tower attached to a building
- Markings: white tower with a red vertical stripe on the range line, red lantern
- Operator: Tanzania Ports Authority

Light
- Focal height: 37 metres (121 ft)
- Range: 17 nautical miles (31 km; 20 mi)
- Characteristic: Fl W 7.5s.

The Oyster Bay Rear Range Lighthouse is located on the coast of Dar es salaam, Tanzania in Oyster Bay. The lighthouse works in conjunction with the Oyster Bay Range Front Lighthouse to warn ships away from the cliffs at the Msasani peninsula.

The tower is a red square stone tower with one red white strip on the range line. The lighthouse has a small red roofed building adjacent to the tower.

== See also ==
- List of lighthouses in Tanzania
