= Tingatinga (painting) =

Painting style from East Africa

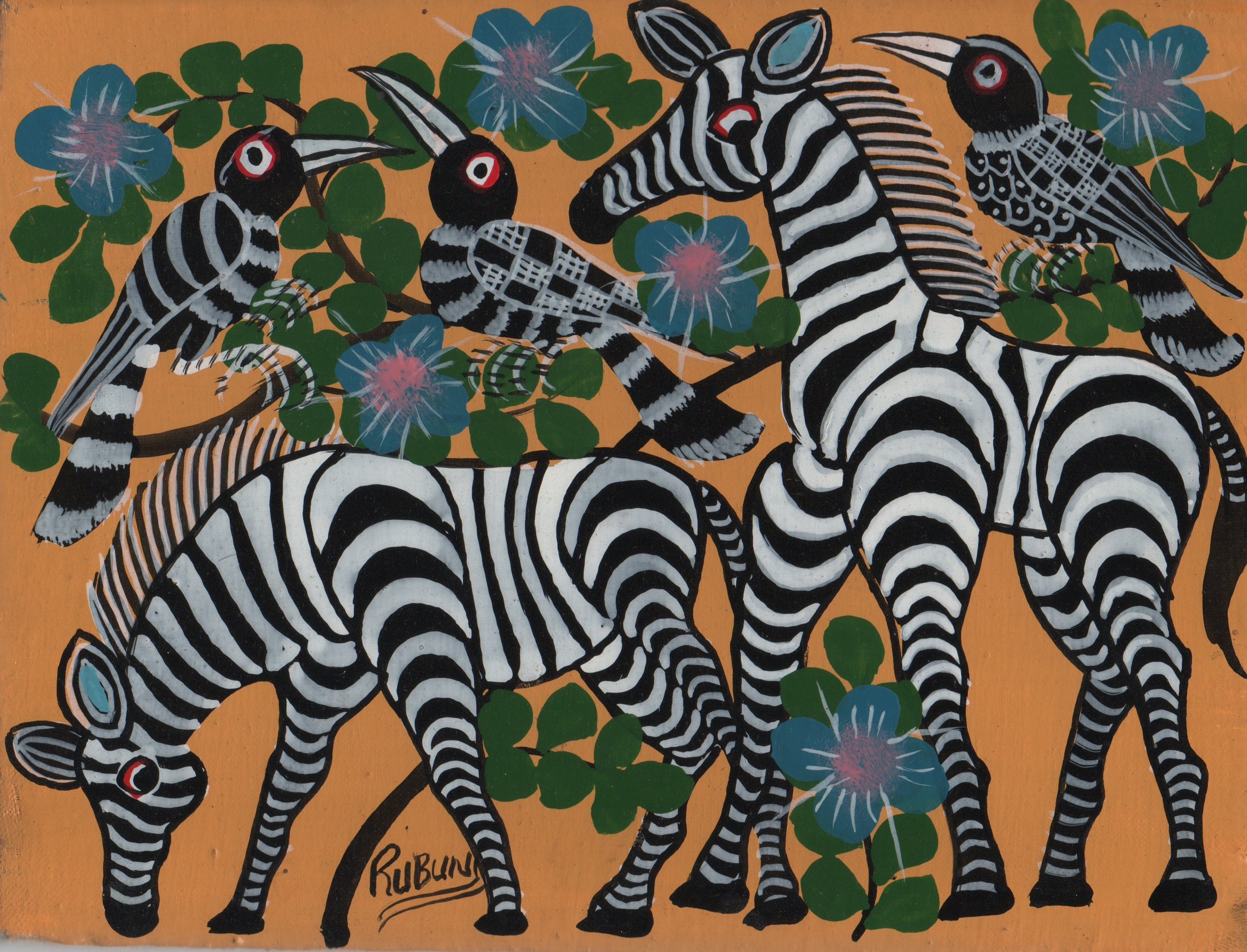
Punda Milia Baba na Mama – painting in Tingatinga style by Rubuni Rashidi Sais (2021)

Tingatinga (also spelled Tinga-tinga or Tinga Tinga) is a painting style from East Africa. Tingatinga is one of the most widely represented forms of tourist-oriented painting in Tanzania, Kenya, and neighbouring countries. The genre is named after its founder, Tanzanian painter Edward Tingatinga, whose work also inspired kids-animation tales, namely Tinga Tinga Tales.

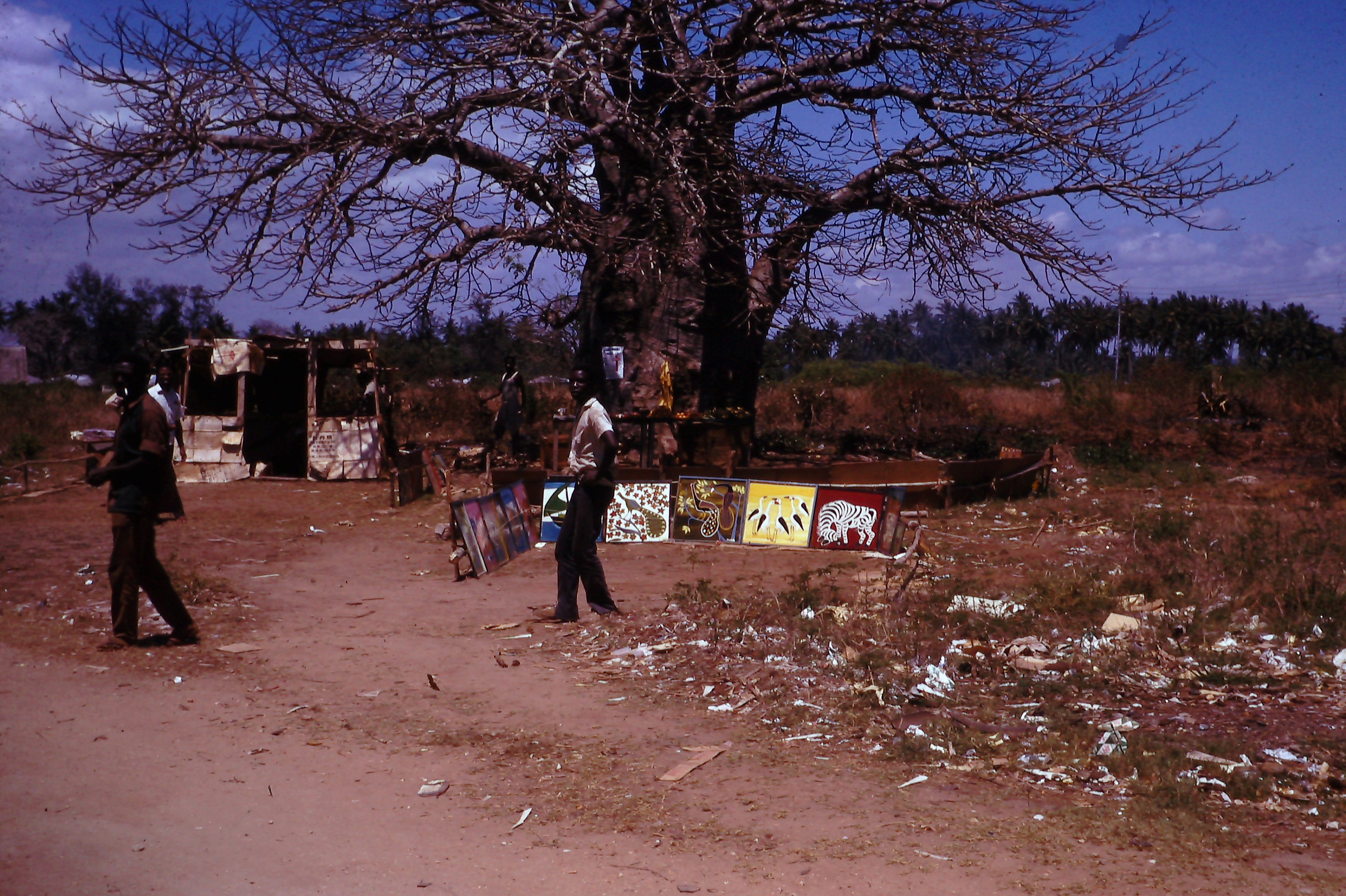
The Tingatinga cooperative sold their work in Oyster Bay, Dar es Salaam. Picture from 1973.

Tingatinga painting is traditionally made on masonite, using several layers of bicycle paint, which makes for brilliant and highly saturated colours. Many elements of the style are related to the requirements of the tourist-oriented market; for example, the paintings are usually small so they can be easily transported, and subjects are intended to appeal to Western buyers (e.g. the Big Five and other wild animals). In this sense, Tingatinga paintings have been considered a form of "airport painting". The images can be described as both naïve and caricatural; humour, and sarcasm are often explicit.

== History ==
The later so-called Tingatinga painting style originated in Tanzania in 1978. It was named after Edward Tingatinga, who started painting in 1968. He employed low-cost materials such as masonite and bicycle paint and attracted the attention of tourists for the colourful, both naïve and surrealistic style. When Tingatinga died in 1972, his style had become so popular that it had started a movement of imitators and followers, sometimes informally referred to as the "Tingatinga school".

The first generation of artists from the Tingatinga school basically reproduced the works of the school's founder. In the 1990s new trends emerged in response to the transformations that Tanzanian society was undergoing. New subjects related to the new urban and multi-ethnic society of Dar es Salaam as for example crowded and busy streets and city squares were introduced, together with occasional technical novelties such as the use of perspective. One of the well-known second-generation Tingatinga painters is Edward Tingatinga's brother-in-law, Simon Mpata.

Because of his short life as artist, Tingatinga left only a relatively small number of paintings, which are sought after by collectors. It is known that fakes were produced from all famous Tingatinga paintings including The Lion, Peacock on the Baobab Tree, Antelope, Leopard, Buffalo, or Monkey.

== Influences ==
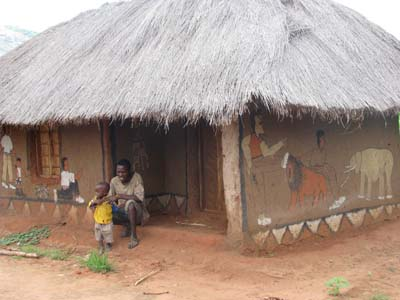
Wall paintings in Ngapa, the village of Edward Tingatinga's father

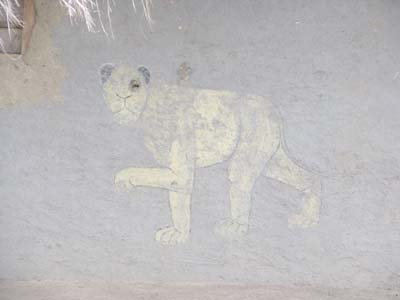
Wall painting in Ngapa depict animals in a naïve style related to Tingatinga art

It is controversial whether Tingatinga's style is completely original or a derivative of traditional forms of East Africa. In his paper Tingatinga and His Followers, Swedish critic Berit Sahlström claimed that Tingatinga was of Mozambican origin and thus suggested that his style might have connections with modern Mozambique. The claim that Tingatinga was of Mozambican descent is nevertheless rejected by most scholars and by the Tingatinga Society.

Art trader Yves Goscinny suggested that Edward Tingatinga might have been influenced by Congolese paintings that were sold in Dar es Salaam at his time. The source of this claim could be some articles by Merete Teisen, where she also claims that Tingatinga decorated two house walls for payment before he started painting on masonite boards.

The claim by Merete Teisen about Tingatinga decorating house walls might also be interpreted as a clue to another origin of Tingatinga's paintings, namely the traditional hut wall decorations of Makua and Makonde people. These paintings were first witnessed by Karl Weule in 1906 and described in his book Negerleben in Ostafrika. Also, ethnologist Jesper Kirknaes and Japanese painting curator Kenji Shiraishi, as well as modern travellers, have seen and documented these paintings in several locations in southern Tanzania, including Ngapa, a village where many relatives of Tingatinga's father still live today.

Jesper Kirknaes also documented those paintings being done in Dar es Salaam by Makua and Makonde migrants. Shiraishi is one of the scholars who most firmly supported the theory that Tingatinga's art is connected to traditional Makua wall paintings. Among other considerations, Shiraishi observed that it is unlikely that a style emerged and spread so quickly over most of East Africa without any connection to traditional art. He claimed that his studies provided evidence for this claim.

In 2010 Hanne Thorup interviewed Tingatinga student Omari Amonde, who confirmed that Tingatinga used to paint on hut walls as a young boy (around 12 years old).

Further elaborating on the Makua painting hypothesis, Shiraishi also suggested a connection between hut walls, painting, and traditional rock paintings, an art form that in Africa has continued past Stone Age to at least the 19th century. Based on this connection, Shiraishi concludes that Tingatinga art might be seen as the "longest artist trend ever".

== The Tingatinga Cooperative Society ==
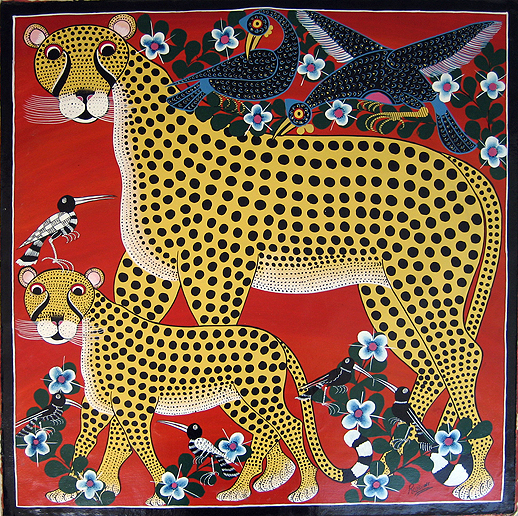
Leopards by Rubuni

After Tingatinga's death, his six direct followers: Ajaba Abdallah Mtalia, Adeusi Mandu, January Linda, Casper Tedo, Simon Mpata, and Omari Amonde tried to organise themselves. Relatives of Tingatinga also joined this group, which would later be called the "Tingatinga (or Tinga Tinga) Partnership". Not all of Tingatinga's followers agreed to be in the partnership; some created a new group at Slipway. In 1990, the Tingatinga Partnership constituted itself into a society, renamed to Tingatinga Arts Cooperative Society (TACS).

The Tingatinga Arts Cooperative Society launched its own website in May 2018, www.TingaTingaArt.com.

== Tingatinga and George Lilanga ==
Although the internationally acclaimed Tanzanian artist George Lilanga was not a student of the Tingatinga school nor a member of the Tingatinga Society, he's known to have frequented Tingatinga artists, and some influence of Tingatinga is evident in his work, for what concerns painting (an art form that Lilanga approached in 1974). This influence has been recognised by Lilanga himself in an interview with Kenji Shiraishi, specifically in reference to the use of enamel paint and square hardboards. Besides using materials and techniques originally adopted by Tingatinga painters, Lilanga's art resembles Tingatinga also in its use of vibrant colours and its composition style, which shares the same horror vacui of Tingatinga art. It has been suggested that Lilanga (who was originally a sculptor) actually learnt to paint from Tingatinga painters such as Noel Kapanda and later Mchimbi Halfani, who collaborated with him. The collaboration between Lilanga and Kapanda lasted several years.
