= Bibi Titi Mohammed =

Tanzanian feminist, independence activist, and politician

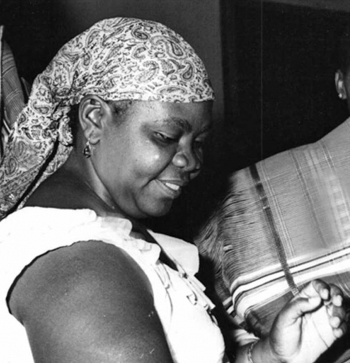
- Bibi Titi Mohammed
- Born: June 1926; Dar es Salaam, Tanzania
- Died: 5 November 2000 (aged 74); Johannesburg, South Africa
- Occupation: Politician

Bibi Titi Mohammed (June 1926 – 5 November 2000) was a Tanzanian politician and activist. She was born in June 1926 in Dar es Salaam, at the time the capital of former Tanganyika. She first was considered a freedom fighter and supported the first president of Tanzania, Julius Nyerere. Bibi Titi Mohammed was a member of the Tanganyika African National Union (TANU), the party that fought for the independence of Tanzania, and held various ministerial positions. In October 1969, she was sentenced for treason, and, after two years in prison, received a presidential pardon.

== Biography ==
=== Early life ===
As she was growing up in the Matumbi tribe, her father refused to send her to school, because he feared she would lose her Muslim faith. After her father died, her mother decided to send her to school, because she saw the importance of an education for a young woman. Bibi Titi's mother's influence helped Bibi fight for women's rights and helped her in her fight for independence.

=== Marriage and children ===
At age fourteen, she married an older man, whom she divorced after the birth of her first child, a daughter named Halima. Because of Bibi Titi's ideals, her daughter was not allowed to marry, until she completed school. Bibi Titi later remarried and divorced two more husbands.

=== Political career ===
Bibi Titi Mohammad began her public career as the lead singer in a ngoma (a dance and music group), where she celebrated the birth of the prophet Mohammed during Maulidi. In the 1950s, after World War II, she started to get involved with the nationalist movement in Tanzania and on July 7, 1954, TANU was created by Julius Nyerere. She became a close friend of his, after being introduced to him in 1954 by the driver of a family cab.

In 1955, Mohammed became the chairperson of the 'Umoja wa Wanawake wa Tanzania' (UWT - United Women of Tanzania), which was the women's branch of TANU. Within three months of her coming into the position, she was able to enroll more than 5000 women into TANU and helped play a major role in the fight for independence against British colonial rule. Mohammed was able to bring the UWT's ideas to the masses and also unified women against colonialism by giving them one voice.

Tanzania became an independent country in 1961, and her leadership also helped with writing the constitution in 1964. She became junior minister for women and social affairs and achieved a place for women in the Tanzanian government. Also, she played an important role in the creation of the All African Women Conference.

In 1965, Bibi Titi lost her parliamentary seat, which meant her loss of power. By 1967, she resigned her position in the party's central committee. She was protesting a provision in the Arusha Declaration, Nyerere's plan for African socialism. This declaration banned all central committee members from renting properties. Because of most women's lack of education, the right to rent properties was one of the few things that helped them earn a stable income.

=== UWT ===
Bibi Titi Mohammed was a key person for the creation of TANU (Tanganyika African National Union), which became the major political party in Tanzania. Mohammed's involvement began when she met Julius Nyerere, who would eventually become the first president. Mohammed and other women, such as Sofia Kawawa and Mwasaburi Ali, were able to hold positions of leadership with TANU, mostly due to Nyerere's belief in gender equality. Giving women visibility was a major priority of Nyerere's policy, giving Mohammed the platform she needed. Bibi Titi Mohammed was the leader of the women's wing of TANU, called Umoja wa Wanawake wa Tanzania (UWT). This organization was key in promoting the beliefs and ideals of TANU. UWT also was an important tool in uniting women throughout Tanzania.

=== Arrest and detention ===
In October 1969, Bibi Titi and the former Labour Minister Michael Kamaliza were arrested, along with four army officers, charged with plotting to overthrow the government. Seen as in instigator of protests, she was put on trial for plotting to take over Tanzanian government. Tanzania's first treason trial was held, and after a 127-day trial, Mohammed was sentenced to life imprisonment; she was put on house arrest. During the trial, her political associates disowned her, and most of her friends deserted her. While in prison, her husband, who was ashamed of her, divorced her and left her alone to try to prove her innocence. After two years into her life sentence, Nyerere commuted her sentence, and she was released from prison.

=== Death and late recognition ===
After Bibi Titi was released from prison, she disappeared from public life and lived the rest of her life in Johannesburg, South Africa. In 1991, when Tanzania was celebrating 30 years of independence, Bibi Titi appeared in the ruling party's paper as "A Heroine of Uhuru (Freedom) Struggle". On November 5, 2000, Mohammed died at Net Care Hospital in Johannesburg, where she had been treated.

== Legacy ==
Bibi Titi Mohammed's legacy lives on in Tanzania. She played a pivotal role in education and women's equality. She fought her government for what she believed in, even when it got her in trouble. Today, one of Dar es Salaam's major roads is named after Mohammed in honour of the great achievements made by her toward Tanzanian independence.

In 2020, Deutsche Welle's 'African Roots' history project for young people in Africa produced an animated story and video about her life.

== Bibliography ==
- Anderson, Gary L.; Herr, Kathryn G. (2007). Encyclopedia of Activism and Social Justice. SAGE Publications. p. 966. ISBN 978-1452265650.
- Cornwall, Andrea (2005). Readings in Gender in Africa. Indiana University Press. p. 211. ISBN 0253345170.
- Sheldon, Kathleen E. (2005). Historical Dictionary of Women in Sub-Saharan Africa. Scarecrow Press. p. 155. ISBN 0810853310.
