= Bransgrove =

Bransgrove is a surname. Notable people with the surname include:

- James Bransgrove (born 1995), English footballer
- Peter Bransgrove (1914–1966), English architect
- Rod Bransgrove (born c. 1950), English businessman and cricket administrator
