= Peter Bransgrove =

Charles Alfred "Peter" Bransgrove (7 April 1914 – 26 January 1966) was an architect who mostly worked in Dar es Salaam but also in other parts of Tanganyika, Kenya and Uganda.

== Biography ==
Born in Kingston, Surrey, England on 7 April 1914 he was the fourth child to Sidney and Julie Bransgrove. He studied at the School of Architecture at the Regent Street Polytechnic in London and at the Royal Academy of Architecture, also in London. In 1947 he was employed as an architect for the Tanganyika Groundnut Scheme. When Peter's role in the scheme came to an end in 1948, he moved from Kongwa to Dar es Salaam and opened the first independent architectural practice in Dar es Salaam, C. A. Bransgrove & Partners. His design style was a climate-driven version of the Modernist movement.

== Modernism ==
Modernism in Architecture was a result of both advancement in technology and fabrication, as well as social enlightenment, that swept through the Western World soon after the First World War. Walter Gropius founded the Bauhaus, Le Corbusier published his "ideas" about architecture and by the end of the 1920s, Mies van der Rohe had built the Barcelona Pavilion.

== Biography ==
Peter finished primary school in 1926 and in 1927, at the age of thirteen, was enrolled into the School of Architecture at the Regent Street Polytechnic in London. From an early age he was exposed to the new architectural style of the day. It was an exciting period to be part of, with old traditional ways of designing a building opposed to the new movement of thinking sweeping Europe and North America. There would have been much discussion between those 'for' and those 'against'.

Having completed five years at the Polytechnic, Peter was employed by the architect Herbert William Matthews in 1934, located at 1 Manchester Square, London. Later (1943), in Peter's nominations papers to be accepted into the Royal Institute of British Architects, Mr Matthews writes:

"For some years he (Peter) was Principal Assistant in my office. I regard him as a very competent architect and a person of integrity and suitable for election to the RIBA."

In 1935, Peter was accepted into the Royal Academy of Architecture. It is quite likely that he continued to work in the office of Mr Matthews during this time. Whilst at the Royal Academy, Peter won many prizes for his student work, including:

- 1935 – 1st Landseer Prize (£15) and silver medal for a set of measured drawings of any building or part of a building.
- 1938 – 1st Landseer Prize (£20), silver medal and a hand-bound with tooled leather book on "discourses" (lectures) by Sir Joshua Reynolds for An Architectural Design.
- 1939 – RA Gold medal and "Edward Stott Travelling Studentship" (£200), for the architectural design of a Campo Santo (holy field and Crematorium). This is the highest award given to students of Architecture.

Having completed his time at the Academy in 1939, Peter may have left his place of employment to work for various Government Departments. The war in Europe had begun and it would have been difficult to find work.

In 1942, during the Second World War, Peter was stationed in Bangalore, India as a "Sapper" (Royal Engineers) Captain, where he was involved in defusing bombs. On his return to England in 1944, Peter resumed his employment with Herbert William Matthews. During this time he also carried out commissions under his own name, mostly around reconstructive work of bomb affected housing.

He passed his Registration Final in London in 1944 and was accepted into the RIBA as an Associate in 1945. By 1946 he had taken up work for the Ministry of Works and Planning.

After the war, Britain was stretched financially. All round the world they had assets that had been shipped to various theatres of war and were left idle and unused. In Tanganyika, there was a large amount of civil works machinery that was going to have to be abandoned. At the same time the Overseas Food Corporation saw the need to supply the world with more vegetable oils from nuts, but required civil engineering equipment to make it work. Hence the Tanganyika Groundnut Scheme was formed and in 1947 Peter took up the opportunity to be involved.

APPOINTMENTS
Mr. C. A. Bransgrove [A] has been appointed Chief Architect to Messrs. Pauling & Co., Ltd., Civil Engineering Contractors for the groundnut project in Tanganyika. He will be pleased to receive trade catalogues, etc., from firms interested in exporting to East Africa. His address is P.O. Kongwa, Tanganyika, East Africa.

Pauling & Co., Ltd. were employed by the United Africa Company to undertake ground clearance.

By 1948, either the demise of the Scheme was becoming apparent or the work for architects was complete. Whatever the reason, Peter's involvement in the Groundnut Scheme came to an end. In lieu of payment for himself and his new family to return to England, he accepted a plot of land, owned by the Overseas Food Corporation, in the suburb of Kurasini in Dar es Salaam. Here he designed and built the family house that they would live in until the completion of Luther House in 1963. The family then moved into the penthouse of Luther House, which adjoined the practice offices on the fifth floor.

In the same year (1948) Peter opened the first independent architectural practice in Dar es Salaam. C. A. Bransgrove & Partners was based in TanCott House and one of his first employees was Alf "Tigger" Hastings. A few years after, Hastings left the practice to set up his own office and co-founded the practice of French & Hastings. Both French and Hastings were possibly with the Royal Engineers during the war.

Another notable name to be employed by Peter was H. L. "Sukhi" Shah. His father Luvji Kara Shah, was the bookkeeper for C. A. Bransgrove. Sukhi joined the practice with an eye to becoming an architect. He was shipped off to England in 1952 by his father to attend the Regent Street Polytechnic and studied architecture between 1952–1958. He started his own practice on his return to Dar es Salaam in 1960.

Joe Herbert Betts joined Peter as a Partner in the early days of the practice and became sole owner of C. A. Bransgrove and Partners for a further four years after Peter's death. A month after the passing of Peter, an architect by the name of Raymond Howes was met off the plane from Australia by Joe Betts to join the practice and stayed until 1971. During that time Joe and Raymond designed many buildings in Dar and other locations in Tanzania. In 1970 the practice was taken over by Jackson Hill Architects. The practice of Jackson Hill was incorporated into the firm of Covell Matthews Partnership Ltd, Tanzania in 1972.

Peter was involved in many projects and building types throughout Tanganyika, Kenya and Uganda. Mostly however they were in Dar es Salaam and included high rise office blocks, low rise offices, schools, hospitals, hostels, churches, post offices, embassies and private residences.

Most notably, the countries for which Peter designed houses for their Consuls were:

- America: Robert A. McKinnon (Consul) and William B. Edmondson (Vice-Consul). Both houses were on Queens Drive (now Toure Drive), Oyster Bay.
- Holland: Ernst Henry van Eeghen. Queens Drive (now Toure Drive), Oyster Bay.
- Belgium: 3 houses on Upanga Rd (now Ali Hassan Mwinyi Rd), Oyster Bay.
- British High Commission: originally designed for Antoniou at #1 Kingsway (now Kenyatta Drive), Oyster Bay.
- Italy: originally designed for Amir Karimjee on Kingsway Drive (now 104 Kenyatta Drive), Oyster Bay.

During the early 1960s, Peter made a number of trips to Rome to the architectural firm of Whiting Associates International, to co-design the Kilimanjaro Christian Medical Centre in Moshi, Tanzania for the Protestant Churches in the country, known collectively as The Good Samaritan Foundation.

There is no denying that Peter's design style was a climate-driven version of the Modernist movement. Known simply as "tropical modernism", the term and therefore type of architecture was a direct mix of both the "international style" of the time and that of the location and requirement to address the heat by ensuring any breeze was unhindered through the building and at the same time deny the sun direct access. Usually based on a grid system, there was a notable lack of fanciful adornment and a strong sense of simplicity. The climate to a certain extent dictated the type of materials used and the methods employed to combat the heat and humidity.

From 1951 to 1955 he was a member of the Dar es Salaam City Council and he also served on the Tanganyika Advisory Council for Education and the National Housing Corporation. In 1961, Peter had helped to set up the International School of Tanganyika. At the time of his death in 1966 he was chairman of the International School Board of Directors.

On 10 April 1956 Peter put forward a Patent for "louvre blocks" for use in building in the tropics:

"The concrete building block comprises two parallel end panels united by one or more inclined webs extending upwardly from the front edges of the panels to the rear thereof. The blocks are laid in superposed courses, to form louvres, the web having an upward extension which fits between the end panels of the block above it. Keying grooves are provided at the ends of the block."

Many of his buildings used this concrete block for ventilation as well as preventing both direct sunlight and rain to enter.

Peter has been described by current architects and researchers as a leading exponent of the Modernist style in Tanzania during that period and an architect to be admired and extolled for what he contributed during his time. "He shaped a considerable part of the old city centre of Dar es Salaam in the fifties and sixties."

Peter died in Nairobi Hospital on 26 January 1966, aged 51.

== Some of the Bransgrove-designed buildings in Dar es Salaam ==
1. British Legion Offices and Hostel
2. First Permanent Building Society
3. Luther House
4. Government European School
5. Barclays Bank DCO
6. Pamba House
7. Branch Post Office
8. YWCA Dar es Salaam
9. Tanganyika Standard Offices
10. Libya Street Post Office

== Details of some of the Bransgrove-designed buildings in Dar es Salaam ==
=== 1. British Legion Offices and Hostel ===
- Dar es Salaam, Tanzania
- Client: British Legion
- Completion Date: 1952
- Address: Main Avenue (Sokoine Drive) and Said Bargash Street (Algeria Street)
- Building type: commercial
- Building usage: office building

=== 2. First Permanent Building Society ===
- Dar es Salaam, Tanzania
- Variant names: Hifadhi House (current), First Permanent Building Society of Tanganyika, Permanent House
- Completion Date: 1961, refurbishment 1999
- Address: Ingles Street (Azikiwe Street) and Acacia Avenue (Samora Avenue)
- Building type: commercial
- Building usage: office building/complex

=== 3. Luther House ===
- Dar es Salaam, Tanzania
- Variant names: Luther House Hostel (Variant)
- Completion Date: 1962
- Client: Christian Council of Tanganyika
- Address: Main Avenue (Sokoine Drive) opposite Byatt Road (Pamba Road)
- Building type: commercial
- Building usage: office building/hotel

=== 4. Government European School ===
- Dar es Salaam, Tanzania
- Variant names: Burton Street School, Junior European School, Bunge Primary School (Current)
- Completion Date: 1957
- Client: The European Education Authority and the P.W.D.
- Address: Burton Street (Shaarban Robert Road)
- Building type: government
- Building usage: education

=== 5. Barclays Bank DCO ===
- Dar es Salaam, Tanzania
- Variant names: NMB Bank House (Current)
- Completion Date: 1955
- Address: Acacia Avenue (Samora Avenue) and Byatt Road (Pamba Road)
- Building type: commercial
- Building usage: bank offices

=== 6. Pamba House ===
- Dar es Salaam, Tanzania
- Client: Lint & Seed Marketing Board
- Completion Date: 1958 (original 2 storey), 1962 (current, shown)
- Address: Garden Avenue and Byatt Road (Pamba Road)
- Building type: commercial
- Building usage: office building/complex

=== 7. Branch Post Office ===
- Dar es Salaam, Tanzania
- Client: East African Posts and Telecommunications Corp.
- Completion Date: 1969
- Address: Ingles Street (Azikiwe Street)
- Building type: government
- Building usage: post office

=== 8. YWCA Dar es Salaam ===
- Dar es Salaam, Tanzania
- Variant names: Young Women's Christian Association (Variant), YWCA Hostel (Variant)
- Design: Joe Betts
- Completion Date: 1969
- Address: Ingles Street (Azikiwe Street) and Gymkhana Avenue (Ghana Street)
- Client: YWCA of Tanzania
- Building type: commercial
- Building usage: hotel

=== 9. Tanganyika Standard Offices ===
- Dar es Salaam, Tanzania
- Variant names: Tanganyika Standard Newspaper Offices (Variant)
- Completion Date: 1952, later additions
- Address: Ingles Street (Maktaba Street)
- Building type: commercial
- Building usage: demolished

=== 10. Libya Street Post Office ===
- Dar es Salaam, Tanzania
- Variant names: Sultan Street Post Office (Original name)
- Completion Date: 1956
- Address: Sultan Street (Libya Street) and South Street
- Building type: government
- Building usage: post office

<

== Author ==
This article was written and compiled by Graham Hutton B.Arch., who is a grandson of C.A. "Peter" Bransgrove.
