= Mwera language =

Bantu language of Tanzania

Mwera
- Cimwera
- Native to: Tanzania
- Ethnicity: Mwera people
- Native speakers: (470,000 cited 2001)
- Language family: Niger–Congo?: Atlantic–Congo; Benue–Congo; Bantoid; Bantu; Rufiji–Ruvuma; Ruvuma; Yao–Mwera; Mwera

Language codes
- ISO 639-3: mwe
- Glottolog: mwer1248
- Guthrie code: P.22

Mwera is a Bantu language of Tanzania.
