= Mwasaburi Ali =

Mwasaburi Ali, also known as Bi Mwasaburi and Azizi Ali, was a Tanzanian activist and member of Umoja wa Wanawake wa Tanzania and Tanganyika African National Union. She was born in Segera village near Dar es Salaam, the capital of former Tanganyika. She worked alongside other prominent women to fight for independence and helped to mobilize women nationally. She later became an Observer in a Primary Court; little is known about her death due to archival limitations.

== Early life ==
Mwasaburi Ali identified as both Shirazi and “Kila Kisoma,” a reference to readers of the Quran. Shirazis in Dar es Salaam had roots in Bava, which was in present-day Somalia, and they had a sizable influence on the East African coast. Mwasaburi Ali’s father, Ali bin Mussa, was a government railway technician during German rule. Her mother, Nyembo binti Mwinyi, was one of his two wives, and Mwasaburi Ali described her as “just a housewife.” Mwasaburi’s childhood was one of playing, learning Arabic, and reading the Quran. She spent most of her life growing up inside her house. At the age of fifteen, Mwasaburi Ali married a truck driver and construction worker; she led a life of solitude and had five children during this time.

== Tanganyika African National Union /Activism ==
Mwasaburi Ali was an active participant in TANU and credited the organization for women gaining the freedom of movement and independent thought. Mwasaburi Ali experienced strict seclusion during her youth and young adulthood, both as a daughter and a wife. She saw this restriction of her movement as unjust and sought ways to engage with others and build something for herself. When expressing the importance of TANU, she spoke of women’s position prior to its existence remarking, “The women had no say. We had nothing to say, and whatever we wanted to say, we had to follow what [someone else] said. That was why we increased our efforts.” She expressed that prior to TANU women had right to speak their minds in front of men. Women in TANU, including Mwasaburi, used the saying “all people are equal” to fight for women's right to autonomy and self-determination. TANU women stated that equality and non-discrimination were essential to personhood and nationhood and highlighted the opportunities now available to the daughters and granddaughters under TANU leadership.

Women were mediators between out-of-touch African male elites and the general Tanganyikan public. They travelled to rural areas and mobilized thousands to join the movement. Especially successful at recruiting women, they had a far wider reach due to the accessibility of their goals. Women were prominent leaders across TANU, and the success of the movement relied on their ability to rally people from diverse backgrounds. As a prominent figure in the organization, Mwasaburi Ali accompanied Nyerere to India and had the opportunity to see much of the country.

== Umoja wa Wanawake wa Tanzania ==
Within the organization Mwasaburi Ali was part of the women’s section of TANU, headed by Bibi titi Mohammed, called Umoja wa Wanawake wa Tanzania (UWT) - along with other prominent women like Sofia Kawawa, Urmila Jhaveri, Sara Lusinde, Sara Nyerenda, and Bi Hawa Mafuta. They were involved in grassroots work in many regions of the country. UWT regularly met in Shinyanga but visited other districts around Tanganyika like Mara and Nzega. In Nzega, the women worked the fields in the early morning, clearing the ground, digging, and meeting with groups of people to find solutions to their day-to-day problems. In these villages, women faced issues such as a lack of educational opportunity for their children, a lack of water and medicine, declining health, and overbearing village elders/government bureaucrats and husbands.

== Ngoma and Taraab Drum Dance ==
Mwasaburi Ali was also part of the Ngoma and Taraab dance groups within TANU and highlighted the importance of them in mobilizing women’s support and raising money for TANU. Bi Hawa Mafuta was the mother or leader of the dance groups. Taraab was culturally significant to sophisticated urban women in Dar es Salaam. It was restricted to those who spoke standard Swahili and dressed “well.” Mwasaburi stated that those from outside Dar es Salaam could not join until they moved to the region and adopted the customs. The group would invite Nyerere or Mwalimu (teacher) as Mwasaburi referred to him “not as a leader but as a special guest to join”, the money garnered from playing taraabs was given to Nyerere as a gift to contribute to independence and support his travel costs so that all would be liberated.

== Interview with Geiger ==
Mwasaburi Ali was interviewed by Susan Geiger in 1984. Geiger is a famous historian, and her interview with Mwasaburi Ali increased her visibility and recognition. At the time of the interview, she was an observer in a Primary Court (a position typically held by older women). She refused to comment on Bibi titi Mohammed, who had fallen from grace and been exiled, though she was later recognized for her contributions. Mwasaburi Ali did, however, mention the other women she deemed as particularly important to TANU’s success, including Mrs. Sophia Kawawa, stating that Kawawa is to the women what Mwalimu is to the movement. She also highlighted Tatu Mzee, Halima Hamisi, and Asha Ngoma.
