= Ngindo language =

Language

Ngindo
- Kingindo
- Native to: Tanzania
- Ethnicity: Ngindo people
- Native speakers: (220,000 cited 1987)
- Language family: Niger–Congo?: Atlantic–Congo; Benue–Congo; Bantoid; Bantu; Rufiji–Ruvuma; Mbinga; Lwegu; Ngindo

Language codes
- ISO 639-3: nnq
- Glottolog: ngin1244
- Guthrie code: P.14

Ngindo is a Bantu language of Tanzania.
