= Edward Tingatinga =

Tanzanian painter

Edward Saidi Tingatinga (1932–1972) was a Tanzanian painter, best known as the founder of the eponymous painting style and school.

== Biography ==
=== Birth and family ===
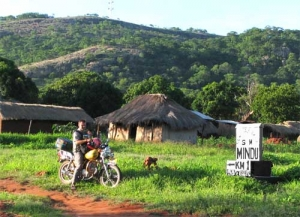
Mindu, the nearest village to Namochelia where E. S. Tingatinga was born. Daniel Augusta on motorbike, Mindu (2009)

Tingatinga was born in 1932 in a village called Namochelia, in the Tunduru District of Ruvuma Region in southern Tanzania, near the border with northern Mozambique. A village by that name no longer exists; it may have ceased to exist in the 1960s as a consequence of the relocation of small villages that was part of the Ujamaa program of President Julius Nyerere. Today's settlements in that area include Mindu, Nakapanya and Mtonya. Many members of Edward Tingatinga's family (on the mother's side) still live in those villages; relatives from the father's side live in Ngapa, about 20 km north of Nakapanya.

Edward Tingatinga was born from a poor family. His mother, Agnes Binti Ntembo, belonged to the Makua ethnic group and was a Christian, while his father, Saidi Tingatinga, was a Ngindo and a Muslim. This is why the child was given both a Christian name (Edward) and a Muslim name (Saidi). Because of the matrilinear heritage of the Makua traditional society, Edward Tingatinga should be considered of Makua descent. As a child, he was mostly cared for by his mother's family. Eventually, the relationship between Agnes Ntembo and Saidi Tingatinga broke down. Agnes Ntembo had three more sons with two other partners, namely Andrea Gallusi, Simon Mpata and Cesilia Mpata. Simon Mpata, as well as Agnes Mpata (Cesilia's daughter) would later follow Edward's footsteps and join the society of painters he would found.

=== Career ===
In the 1950s, Edward left his mother and went to work in the plantations of sisal in Tanga Region of northern Tanzania; later, he was invited by his uncle Salum Mussa Mkayoga (also known as Mzee Lumumba), who worked as a cook of a British officer in Dar es Salaam. Tingatinga found favour with him and was employed as gardener. At the same time he began experimenting first as a musician and (in 1968) as a painter.

His paintings were made using recycled, low-cost materials, such as masonite squares, ceramic fragments, and bicycle paint. His style was naïve, bordering on surrealistic and humorous.

In 1970 he married Agatha Mataka, who was a Makonde from Mozambique. Eventually, Tingatinga's paintings became very popular among European residents and tourists, so that he was able to work full-time as an artist. He later gathered a group of apprentices and followers, that would later organize themselves into the Tingatinga Art Co-operative Society. Some of Tingatinga's followers in the Society (e.g., January Linda, Adeusi Mandu, Ajaba Adballah Mtalia, Casper Tedo, Simon Mptata and Omari Amonde) were Edward's or his wife's relatives, either Makua or Makonde. Of the first generation of Tingatinga students, only Edward's nephew Omari Amonde is still living.

=== Death and heritage ===
In 1972 Tingatinga was accidentally killed by a policeman who mistook him for a fugitive. The Tingatinga school survived, and grew in size and relevance. Through Tingatinga's followers and imitators, the Tingatinga style gradually became the prominent type of tourist-oriented paintings in both Tanzania, Kenya, and a large part of East Africa.

Tingatinga is buried at the Msasani Cemetery in Dar es Salaam.

== Dispute about the origin ==
Some sources claim that he was born in Mozambique rather than Tanzania. According to Daniel Augusta of the Tingatinga Arts Cooperative Society, all these sources can be traced back to a mistake found in 1996 article by Swedish art critic Berit Sahlström, Tingatinga and His Followers, that also reports Tingatinga's first name as "Eduardo" instead of "Edward". Sahlström herself never met or interviewed the Tingatinga painters, but admittedly relied on a research paper by her student Mia Terent, who in turn reportedly got this information from the Swedish-Tanzanian missionary Barbro Johansson (also known as "Mama Barbro") in an interview on 12 May 1996.

The Tingatinga painters, the Tingatinga Arts Co-operative (TACS), and members of Edward's family (including his living son and daughter Daudi and Martina, his brother-in-law Gallusi and his half brother Omari Amonde), as well as scholars and art traders (among them, Jesper Kirknaes, Merete Teisen, Yves Goscinny, and Felix Lorenz, who long worked with the Tingatinga painters) reject the idea that Tingatinga was born in Mozambique. Despite being invited by the Tingatinga Society to publicly correct her mistake, Sahlström refused to do so, but not on the basis that she was certain of her claim.

== Bibliography ==
- Tingatinga Arts Cooperative Society, Tingatinga in Kiswahili and English (Mture Educational Publishers Ltd, 1998, 2005) ISBN 9976-967-34-9
- Tine Thorup, Cuong Sam, Tingatinga - Kitsch or Quality (ThorupArt, 2011) ISBN 978-87-992635-2-3
