= Rufiji–Ruvuma languages =

Group of Bantu languages

Rufiji–Ruvuma
- Geographic distribution: Mozambique, Malawi, Tanzania
- Linguistic classification: Niger–Congo?: Atlantic–Congo; Benue–Congo; Southern Bantoid; Bantu; Rufiji–Ruvuma

Language codes
- Glottolog: rufi1235

The Rufiji–Ruvuma languages are a group of Bantu languages established by Gloria Waite (1979) and subsequent researchers: N10 (less Manda), P10 (Ngindo moved to N10), P20.

The languages, or clusters, along with their Guthrie identifications are:

- Ruvuma (P20):
  - Yao–Mwera
  - Makonde: Makonde–Machinga, Mabiha
- Mbinga
  - Ruhuhu (N10): Matengo, Mpoto
  - Matandu (P10): Matumbi, Ndengereko (Rufiji)
  - Lwegu: Ngindo (P10), Ndendeule, Ndwewe (N10)
- Songea (N10): Ngoni

Among the Guthrie languages not specifically classified are Nindi (N10, said to be close to Ndendeule); and Tonga of Malawi (N10).

Nurse moves Manda to Bena–Kinga, but Ehret keeps it here.
