= Michael Kamaliza =

Tanzanian politician

Michael Kamaliza was a Tanzanian politician who was a minister of labor and general secretary of the National Union of Tanganyika Workers.

In October 1969, he was arrested, along with a group of army officers and former head of the National Women's Organisation Bibi Titi Mohammad. Kamaliza and the others were alleged to have plotted a coup and assassination against Tanzania president Julius Nyerere. After a trial that lasted from 24 June 1970 to February 1971, they were sentenced for treason.

Kamaliza was co-founder of the African Commercial Employee's Association in 1951 and the Tanganyika Federation of Labour (TFL) in 1955.
