= Manda people =

Ethnic group from Ruvuma Region and Njombe Region of Tanzania

The Manda is an ethnic group based in Ludewa District in the Iringa Region and northern Ruvuma Region of southern Tanzania, along the eastern shore of Lake Malawi. The group migration patterns follows those of others such as the Tumbuka Mulonga Mbulalubilo.

In 2002 the Manda population was estimated to number 22,000. Some of these lived in Gua land and Mkwajuni, Chunya district in Mbeya region. They also found in areas where fishing activities take place like Mtera Reservoir, nyumba ya mungu, mlimba etc. Manda peoples have their own language and customs linked to the Manda people on the western shore of the lake especially in the Nkhata Bay district of Malawi
