= Yao language =

Bantu language spoken in southeast Africa

Yao
- chiYao
- Native to: Malawi, Mozambique
- Ethnicity: Yao
- Native speakers: 3.7 million (2017–2020)
- Language family: Niger–Congo?: Atlantic–Congo; Volta-Congo; Benue–Congo; Bantoid; Southern Bantoid; Bantu; Rufiji–Ruvuma; Ruvuma; Yao–Mwera; Yao
- Writing system: Latin script Mwangwego script

Official status
- Recognised minority language in: Malawi

Language codes
- ISO 639-2: yao
- ISO 639-3: yao
- Glottolog: yaoo1241
- Guthrie code: P.21

- Person: 'Myao
- People: WaYao
- Language: chiYao
- Country: Uyao

Yao is a Bantu language of Malawi and Mozambique. In Malawi, the main dialect is Mangochi, mostly spoken around in Mangochi District. In Mozambique, the main dialects are Makale and Massaninga.

In Malawi, most Yao speakers live in the Southern Region near the southeast tip of Lake Malawi and bordering Mozambique to the east. In Mozambique, most speakers live in Niassa Province from the eastern shore of Lake Malawi (Lago Niassa) to the Lugenda River up to where it meets the Rovuma River. In Tanzania, most speakers live in the south Ruvuma, east of Lake Malawi along the Mozambican border.

== Phonology ==
The phonology of Yao is shown below.

=== Consonants ===
| | | Labial | Alveolar | Palatal | Velar |
|---|---|---|---|---|---|
| Plosive/ Affricate | voiceless | p | t | t͡ʃ | k |
| Plosive/ Affricate | voiced | b | d | d͡ʒ | ɡ |
| Fricative | | | s | | |
| Nasal | | m | n | ɲ | ŋ |
| Approximant | | ʋ | l | j | w |

=== Vowels ===
| | Front | Central | Back |
|---|---|---|---|
| Close | i iː | | u uː |
| Mid | e eː | | o oː |
| Open | | a aː | |

=== Tones ===
Like most Bantu languages, tone plays a role in Yao phonology and morphology. See Mtenje (1990) for discussion of Malawian Yao tone. See Ngunga (1997) for detailed presentation of the segmental phonology of Mozambican Yao.

== Orthography ==
As in English, unvoiced plosives are aspirated and voiced plosives are not. There are conventionally only five 'pure' vowels, viz. a, e, i, o, u, though there is some variation in vowel length. Yao is minimally tonal language, as is common in Bantu languages.

In each of the main three countries where Yao is spoken, the orthography differs widely, and there is a low literacy rate. In Tanzania, the orthography is based on that of Swahili, whereas in Malawi it is based on that of Chewa. The Malawian form uses the following characters:

| Letter: | A | B | Ch | D | E | G | I | J/Dy | K | L | Ly | M | N | Ng' | Ny | O | P | S | T | U | W | Ŵ | Y |
| Value: | a | b | tʃ | d | e~ɛ | ɡ | i | dʒ | k | l | ʎ | m | n | ŋ | ɲ | ɔ~o | p | ʂ | tʰ | u | w | ʋ | j |

Macrons can be used to prevent ambiguity that would otherwise arise due to the lack of representation of vowel length.

== Grammar ==
Yao is an SVO language. Like all Bantu languages, Yao is agglutinative, with a highly regular paradigm of verbal inflection, and its nouns placed in a variety of classes indicated by prefixes, these partially corresponding to actual categories of objects or people. To each class is associated a characteristic, used in the formation of pronouns and concord links, prefixes used before verbs governed by, and adjectives describing, a noun of the given class.

=== Noun classes ===
| Class | Prefix | Class characteristic | Used for |
|---|---|---|---|
| 1 | m-, mu-, mw- | ju | persons singular |
| 2 | ŵa-, a-, acha-, achi- | ŵa | persons plural |
| 3 | m-, mu-, mw- | u | living things singular |
| 4 | mi- | ji | living things plural |
| 5 | li-, ly- | li | miscellaneous singular |
| 6 | ma- | ga | plurals of class 5 |
| 7 | chi-, ch'- | chi | miscellaneous singular |
| 8 | i-, y- | i | plurals of class 7 |
| 9 | n-, ny-, mb-, (nw-) | ji | miscellaneous singular |
| 10 | n-, ny-, mb-, (nw-) | si | plurals of class 9 |
| 11 | lu- | lu | like 9, also singulars of class 10 |
| 12 | ka- | ka | diminutives singular |
| 13 | tu- | tu | plurals of class 13 |
| 14 | u- | u | collective and abstract, no plural; also some singulars of class 6 |
| 15 | ku, kw- | ku | infinitives |
| 16 | (pa-) | pa | locality (at) |
| 17 | (ku-, kwa-) | ku | locality (to) |
| 18 | (mu-, mwa-) | mu | locality (in) |

The corresponding concord links are identical to the nominal prefixes except in the cases of classes 1 and 2, which have concord links 'mb-' and 'a-' respectively. The convention of including classes 16, 17 and 18 deviates from the traditional Bantu system, their prefixes being more properly prepositional or case determiners.

=== Verbal forms ===
The personal forms are given below, with informal forms given in brackets.

| Personal form prefix | English equivalent (pronoun) |
|---|---|
| n-, ni- | I |
| (u-) | (thou) |
| a- | he, she, it, you |
| tu- | we |
| m-, mu-, mw- | you |
| ŵa-, a- | they (he, you) |

There are affirmative and negative forms of the verb, each with approximately the following divisions:

==== Indicative mood ====
As in many Bantu languages, this is characterised by an ending 'a'. Present, immediate future, present perfect, past and past perfect tenses are distinguished, the last being irregular in formation.

==== Subjunctive mood ====
The subjunctive mood is similar in form to the indicative, but as in many Bantu languages, the final 'a' is changed to 'e'. It can be used as a polite imperative, and is usually associated with subordinate clauses.

==== Imperative ====
To form the 'ordinary' (often less polite) imperative, the simple stem may be used, or 'n' may be prefixed to the indicative, or the continuative suffixes '-ga' or '-je' may be added.

=== Pronouns ===
The personal pronouns relate only to classes 1 and 2. Other pronouns are formed from the class links. These pronouns, as a common Bantu feature, are absolute, in that they stand alone from the rest of the sentence: for nominative accusative and prepositional forms, affixes must be used. The third person pronouns depend on noun class, as explained above.

| Absolute pronoun | English equivalent (subject pronoun, object pronoun) |
|---|---|
| une | I, me |
| (ugwe) | thou, thee |
| uwe | we, us |
| umwe | you |

These forms may be combined according to certain normal Bantu laws of vowel elision with prefixes such as 'na' (with, and).

There are also several demonstratives, most of which form triples ('this one', 'that one nearby', and 'that one far away')- that is, triple deixis is used.

== See also ==
- Yao people (East Africa)
- Bantu languages

== Bibliography ==
- Centre for Language Studies (Zomba, Malawi) "Amendments and/or Additional Rules to Ciyawo Orthography 2010"
- Dicks, Ian & Dollar, Shawn (2010) "A Practical Guide to Understanding Ciyawo"
- Hetherwick, Alexander (1889), "Introductory Handbook of the Yao Language"
- Hetherwick, Alexander (1902), "A Handbook of the Yao Language"
- Kaunjika, David Jones (2006), "A Chiyao course in three languages", Montfort Media, Balaka, Malawi
- Yusuf Jonas Msume (2017) https://en.wikipedia.org/wiki/Yao_people_(East_Africa)
- Mtenje, Al (1990), Verb morphology and tone assignment in Chiyao. Afrikanistische Arbeitspapiere (AAP) 22. 41–59.
- Ngunga, Armindo (1997), Lexical Phonology and Morphology of the CiYao Verb Stem. University of California, Berkeley, PhD dissertation. https://escholarship.org/content/qt3xw7j0c2/qt3xw7j0c2_noSplash_5b3f6edf3cbb24dad546d3d22b4de150.pdf
- Sanderson, George Meredith (1922), "A Yao Grammar"
- Sanderson, George Meredith (1954), "A dictionary of the Yao language"
- SIL Mozambique, "Linguas de Moçambique Vocabulario de CIYAO "
- Steere, Edward (1871) "Collections for a Handbook of the Yao Language"
- U.S. Peace Corps manual
- Whiteley, Wilfred Howell (1966), "A study of Yao sentences"
