= Kitay =

Kitay may refer to:

- China (Kitay), in some Slavic languages
- Cathay, alternative English name for China
- David Kitay (born 1961), American film composer
- Kitay-gorod, business district in Moscow
- The New China (Osvobozhdyonnyy kitay), 1950 Soviet documentary

== See also ==
- Kitai (disambiguation)
