= Vita Kawawa =

Tanzanian politician (born 1964)

Honourable Vita Kawawa MP

Member of Parliament for Namtumbo
- Incumbent
- Assumed office December 2005
- Preceded by: Pius Mbawala

Personal details
- Born: 20 January 1964 (age 62) Tanganyika
- Party: CCM
- Relations: Rashidi Kawawa (father); Sofia Kawawa (mother)
- Education: IDS, Cairo; CBE

Vita Rashid Mfaume Kawawa (born 20 January 1964) is a Tanzanian CCM politician and Member of Parliament for Namtumbo constituency since 2005. As of March 1, 2016, Kawawa was serving as the district commissioner of the Kahama district.
