= Simon Mpata =

Tanzanian painter (1942–1984)

Simon George Mpata
- Born: 1942 (age 83–84); Tanzania
- Died: 1984
- Occupation: Painter

Simon George Mpata (1942–1984) was a Tanzanian painter of the Tingatinga school. He was the youngest half-brother of Edward Tingatinga, founder of the school, and belonged to the restricted group of six students that were directly taught by Tingatinga himself. Among Tingatinga's students, Mpata is considered the most faithful to his teacher's style. Upon Edward Tingatinga's death, Mpata left Tanzania, moving to Nairobi, where he established his own studio. Mpata's art has received international acclaim, mostly thanks to Japanese magazine editor Kazumi Oguro, who was impressed by Mpata's art while visiting Kenya and later organized an exposition in New York and popularized Mpata's art in Japan.
