= Ngapa, Mozambique =

Ngapa
- Village
- Location in Mozambique
- Coordinates: 11°16′04″S 39°17′14″E
- Country: Mozambique
- Province: Cabo Delgado Province
- District: Mueda

Ngapa is a village in Mueda District, in Cabo Delgado Province of northern Mozambique.
