= Conference of Women of Africa and African Descent =

The Conference of Women of Africa and African Descent (CWAAD) was a women's conference held in Accra, Ghana in July 1960. CWAAD was "a high point in transnational solidarity efforts among Black diaspora women where they attempted to lay out the terms of their transnational relationships".

The conference was held at the University College of Ghana in July 1960. The conference was organized by the Ghana Organization of Women, including Hannah Cudjoe. They aimed to encourage transnational links between black women in several ways:

(a) to promote leadership and citizenship amongst women of Africa and African descent; (b) to give the...opportunity to discuss their common problems and how best these could be solved; (c) to promote friendship amongst women of Africa and African descent.

The agenda of Kwame Nkrumah, who opened the conference with a speech, combined non-aligned neutrality in the Cold War with Ghanaian leadership of pan-Africanism. Nkrumah called for a Union of African States, saying that men alone could not eliminate the "artificial boundaries which separate brother from brother and sister from sister".

At the conference there was particular controversy over a resolution condemning the United States and South Africa for their oppression of black people. US conference delegates and observers included Shirley Graham DuBois, Dorothy Ferebee, Anna Arnold Hedgeman, Harold Isaacs and Pauli Murray. Several of the American contingent, such as Hedgeman and Murray, objected to equating the two countries.

Out of the conference evolved the All African Women's Conference.
