= Tunduru District =

District of Ruvuma Region

Coordinates: 11°00′S 37°30′E

Tunduru
- District
- location in Ruvuma Region
- Country: Tanzania
- Region: Ruvuma Region

Area
  - Total: 18,412 km^{2} (7,109 sq mi)

Population (2022)
  - Total: 412,054
  - Density: 22.380/km^{2} (57.963/sq mi)

Tunduru District is one of the five districts in the Ruvuma Region of Tanzania. It is bordered to the north by the Lindi Region, to the east by the Mtwara Region, to the south by Mozambique and to the west by the Namtumbo District. The district is the birthplace of artist Edward Tingatinga.

As of 2022, the population of the Tunduru District was 412,054.

== Administrative subdivisions ==
Tunduru District is administratively divided into seven divisions and twenty-four wards.

=== Divisions ===
The divisions are:

1. Namsakata
2. Nampungu
3. Nalasi
4. Matemanga
5. Nakapanya
6. Lukumbule
7. Mlingoti (comprising the whole of Tunduru township)

=== Wards ===
The wards are:

1. Kalulu
2. Kidodoma
3. Ligoma
4. Ligunga
5. Lukumbule
6. Marumba
7. Matemanga
8. Mbesa
1. Mchesi
2. Mchoteka
3. Mindu
4. Misechela
5. Mlingoti Magharibi (West)
6. Mlingoti Mashariki (East)
7. Mtina
8. Muhuwesi
1. Nakapanya
2. Nalasi
3. Namasakata
4. Nampungu
5. Namwinyu
6. Nandembo
7. Ngapa
8. Tuwemacho
