= Songea District =

District of Ruvuma Region

Coordinates: 10°40′S 36°00′E

Songea
- District
- location in Ruvuma Region
- Country: Tanzania
- Region: Ruvuma Region

Area
  - Total: 578.3 km^{2} (223.3 sq mi)

Population (2022)
  - Total: 286,285
  - Density: 495.0/km^{2} (1,282/sq mi)

Songea Urban District is one of the five districts in the Ruvuma Region of Tanzania. It is bordered to the north by the Songea Rural District, to the east by the Namtumbo District, to the south by Mozambique and to the west by the Mbinga District.

According to the 2022 Tanzania National Census, the population of the Songea Urban District was 286,285.

== Wards ==
The Songea Urban District is administratively divided into 21 wards:

- Bombambili
- Lizaboni
- Majengo
- Matarawe
- Mateka
- Matogoro
- Mfaranyaki
- Misufini
- Mletele
- Mshangano
- Ruhuwiko
- Ruvuma
- Songea Mjini
- Subira
- Tanga
- Mwengemshindo
- Lilambo
- Seedfarm
- Ndilimalitembo
- Msamala
- Mjimwema

== Sources ==
- Songea Urban District Homepage for the 2002 Tanzania National Census
