= Songea Rural District =

District of Ruvuma Region

Coordinates: 11.0221°S 35.6671°E

- District
- Location in Ruvuma Region
- Country: Tanzania
- Region: Ruvuma Region

Area
  - Total: 7,258 km^{2} (2,802 sq mi)

Population (2022)
  - Total: 178,201
  - Density: 24.55/km^{2} (63.59/sq mi)

Songea Rural District is one of five districts in the Ruvuma Region of Tanzania. It is bordered to the north by the Morogoro Region, to the east by the Namtumbo District, to the south by the Songea Urban District, to the west by the Mbinga District and to the Northwest by the Iringa Region.

In 2022, the population of Songea Rural District was 178,201.

== Sources ==
- Ruvuma Region Homepage for the 2002 Tanzania National Census
