= Ngindo people =

Native peoples of Ruvuma, Morogoro and Lindi Region

The Ngindo are an ethnic and linguistic group based in southern Pwani Region, eastern Ruvuma Region, southern Morogoro Region and northern Lindi Region, which in the current area includes Liwale and Kilwa districts in current Tanzania or former Tanganyika, who speak the Ngindo and Ndendeule languages. In 1987, the Ngindo population was estimated to number 220,000.

== Notable Ngindo people ==
- Saidi Alli Amanzi, former District Commissioner of Masasi, Nyamagana, Morogoro and Singida from 2006 to 2016;
- Poet Amir Abdallah Sudi 'Andanenga' whose nickname Andanenga derives from two Ngindo words where anda means 'like' and nenga means 'right me' or 'me', therefore better translated as 'like me and some others'.
