= Nyasa District =

District in Ruvuma, Tanzania

Nyasa Wilaya ya Nyasa (Swahili)
- District
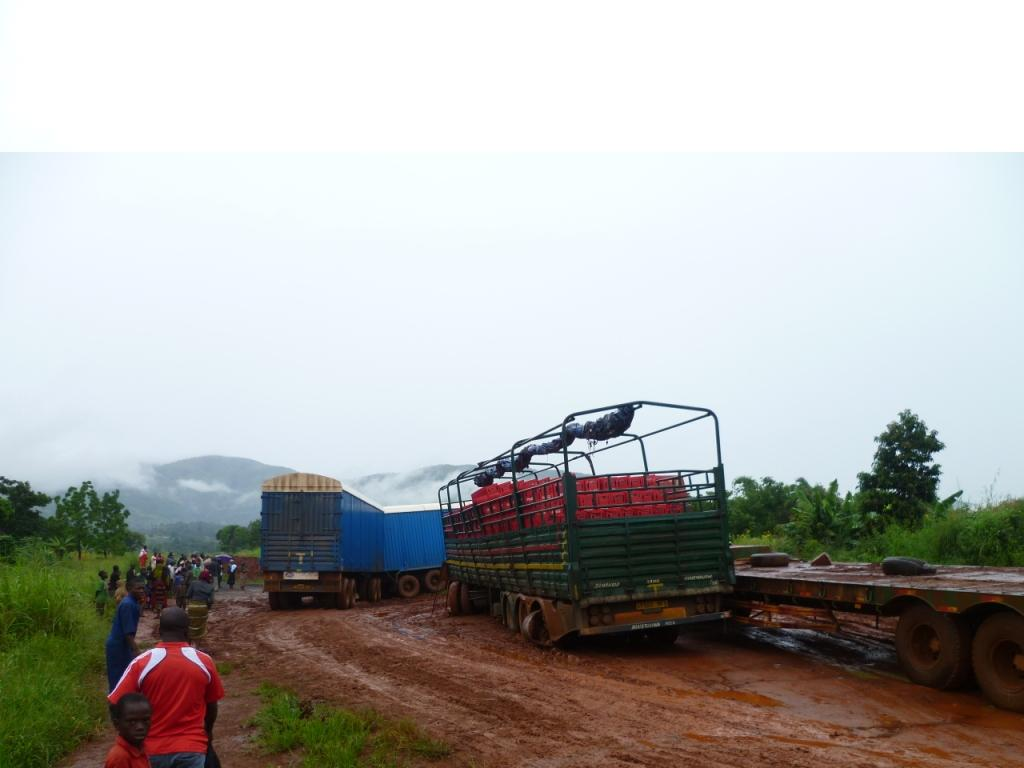
- Road to Mbamba Bay

- Location in Ruvuma Region
- Coordinates: 11.31103°S 34.89892°E
- Country: Tanzania
- Region: Ruvuma Region
- District: Nyasa District
- Established: 8 March 2013
- Headquarters: Mbamba Bay

Government
  - Type: Council
  - Chairman: Stewart J. Nombo
  - Director: Jimson Peter Mhagama

Population (2022)
  - Total: 191,193
- Time zone: EAT
- Postcode: 57xxx
- Area code: 025
- Website: District Website

Nyasa District is a district of the Ruvuma Region of Tanzania.

In 2022 the Tanzania National Bureau of Statistics census report there were 191,193 people in the district, from 146,160 in 2012.

The district has 3 divisions, 20 wards, and 84 villages.
