= Oyster Bay, Tanzania =

Oyster Bay
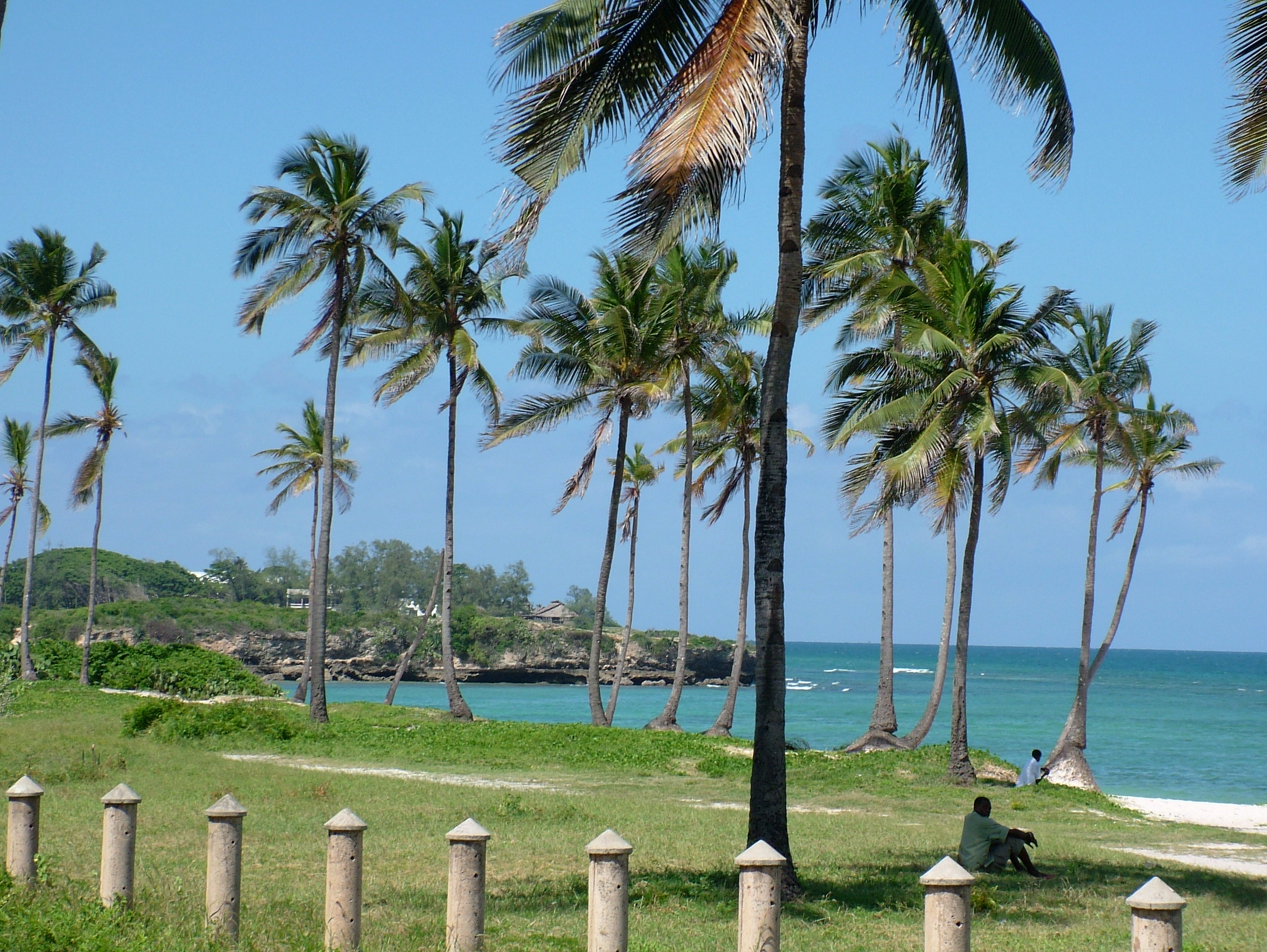
- The Indian Ocean viewed from Oyster Bay in the year 2005.

- Location of Oyster Bay Oyster Bay (Africa) Oyster Bay (Earth)
- Coordinates: 6°46′S 39°18′E
- Country: Tanzania
- Region: Dar es Salaam
- Time zone: UTC+3 (EAT)
- Area code: 022
- Website: City Website

Oyster Bay (also spelled Oysterbay), also known as Cocoa Beach and Coco Beach, is an affluent neighbourhood in Dar es Salaam, Tanzania. It is popularly known for its attractive beach. Oyster Bay is located north west of Dar es Salaam's central business district along the Indian Ocean. Europeans have resided here since colonial times. Since independence, Europeans working for development aid organizations, and senior government officials, including ministers, permanent secretaries, directors and commissioners, reside here and the area is noted for its affluence and social exclusivity.

The area is bounded by the Indian Ocean on the east, Mawenzi Road on the North, Ali Hassan Mwinyi Road to the south, and Ali bin Said Road to the West. Some local institutions are named Oysterbay, including a police station, a hospital and a school.

== Food ==
Oyster Bay is popular for the food sold there, such as Muhogo (cassava), Mishkaki (Grilled meat skewers) and Madafu (Coconut water) sold by traders. Some new restaurants have also been constructed including M Burger.

== Expansion and Renovation ==
In 2015, it was reported that there are plans of developing Coco Beach, which will continue to remain a free open space for public. The main reasons for this plan is to keep it clean, to boost tourism and employment, and to further improve security in the area. Cocoa Beach is being renovated at the cost of TSh 11.6 billion. As of September 2019, transformation of the beach has been started. As of January 2022, renovation is going at a good pace, with many food stalls being constructed to give the beach a beautiful look.

== Economics ==
=== Retail ===
Oysterbay Shopping Centre is located in the centre of the neighbourhood, along with several other businesses.

== Art galleries ==
The founder of the popular Tingatinga painting style, Edward Tingatinga, began his artistic career while in Oyster Bay. The Tanzanian Tingatinga Art Gallery is located here.

== Embassies hosted in Oyster Bay ==
The following 11 embassies are hosted in and near the Oyster Bay area;

1. The Embassy of the People's Republic of China
2. The Embassy of the Republic of Turkey
3. The Embassy of the Federative Republic of Brazil
4. The Embassy of Ireland
5. The Embassy of the Kingdom of Saudi Arabia
6. The Embassy of the Republic of Namibia
7. The Embassy of the Republic of Angola
8. The Embassy of the Republic of Rwanda
9. The Embassy of the Republic of Kenya
10. The Embassy of the French Republic
11. The Embassy of the Russian Federation
