= Ndendeule language =

Bantu language spoken in Tanzania

Ndendeule
- Native to: Tanzania
- Region: Ruvuma
- Ethnicity: Ndendeule (ethnically Ngoni)
- Native speakers: 140,000 (2009)
- Language family: Niger–Congo?: Atlantic–Congo; Benue–Congo; Bantoid; Bantu; Rufiji–Ruvuma; Mbinga; Lwegu; Ndendeule

Language codes
- ISO 639-3: dne
- Glottolog: nden1249
- Guthrie code: N.101
- Linguasphere: 99-AUS-rf

Ndendeule is a Bantu language of Tanzania. Speakers are mostly monolingual.
