= Mbinga District =

District of Ruvuma Region, Tanzania

Coordinates: 10°50′S 34°50′E

Mbinga
- District
- location in Ruvuma Region
- Country: Tanzania
- Region: Ruvuma Region

Mbinga District is one of the five districts of the Ruvuma Region of Tanzania. It is bordered to the north by the Njombe Region, to the east by Songea Rural District and Songea Urban District, to the south by Mozambique and to the west by Lake Nyasa. The district is partly home to the Liparamba Game Reserve.

According to the 2002 Tanzania National Census, the population of the Mbinga District was 404,799. Mbinga District covers an area of 11,396 square kilometres, about 18 percent of the land area of the Ruvuma Region and about 1% of the land mass of Tanzania.

== Wards ==
The Mbinga District is administratively divided into 37 wards:

- Chiwanda
- Kigonsera
- Kihagara
- Kihangi Mahuka
- Kilimani
- Kilosa
- Kingerikiti
- Kitura
- Langiro
- Liparamba
- Lipingo
- Linda
- Litembo
- Lituhi
- Litumbandyosi
- Liuli
- Maguu
- Matiri
- Mbaha
- Mbamba Bay
- Mbangamao
- Mbinga Urban
- Mbuji
- Mikalanga
- Mkumbi
- Mpapa
- Mpepai
- Mtipwili
- Myangayanga
- Ndongosi
- Ngima
- Ngumbo
- Nyoni
- Ruanda
- Tingi
- Ukata
- Utiri

Kilindi

- Mapera

== Notable people ==
Oscar Kambona, former minister of formal affairs
