= Namtumbo District =

District of Ruvuma Region

Coordinates: 10.466417°S 36.130085°E

Namtumbo
- District
- location in Ruvuma Region
- Country: Tanzania
- Region: Ruvuma Region

Area
  - Total: 21,764 km^{2} (8,403 sq mi)

Population (2022)
  - Total: 271,368
  - Density: 12.469/km^{2} (32.294/sq mi)

Namtumbo District is one of the five districts of the Ruvuma Region of Tanzania. It is bordered to the north by the Morogoro Region, to the east by the Tunduru District, to the south by Mozambique and to the west by the Songea Urban District and Songea Rural District.

As of 2022, the population of the Namtumbo District was 271,368.

== Wards ==
The Namtumbo District is administratively divided into 21 wards:

- Kitanda
- Ligera
- Luchili
- Luegu
- Lusewa
- Magazini
- Msisima
- Mgombasi
- Mkongo Nakawale
- Msindo
- Namabengo
- Namtumbo
- Rwinga
- Mchomoro
- Hanga
- Mputa
- Likuyuseka
- Lisimonji
- Mkongo Gulioni
- Litola
- Limamu
- Suluti
- Mtonya
- Nambecha
- Mtwaro pachani

== Notable persons from Namtumbo District ==
- Rashid Kawawa, First Tanzanian Prime Minister
