= Songea =

Capital of Ruvuma Region, Tanzania

- < City of Ruvuma Region
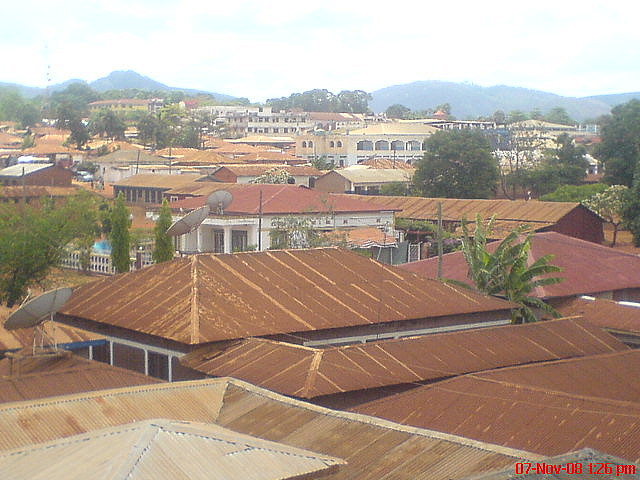
- View of Songea city from Sinyanga Hotel

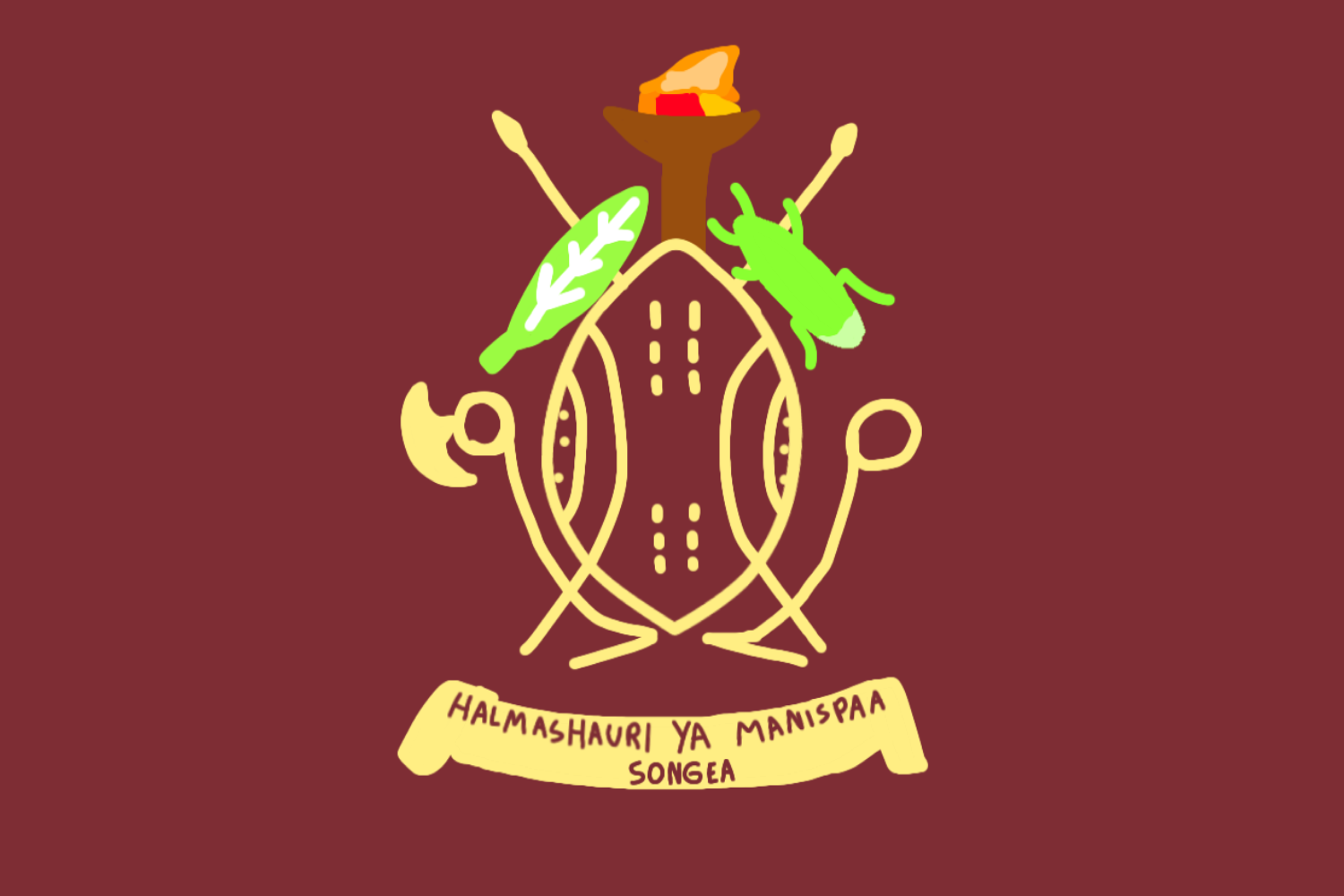
- Flag

- Location of Songea. Songea (Africa)
- Coordinates: 10°41′S 35°39′E
- Country: Tanzania
- Region: Ruvuma
- District: Songea Urban

Population (2022 census)
  - Total: 286,285
- Time zone: UTC+3 (EAT)
- Area code: 025
- Climate: Aw
- Website: Regional website

Songea is the capital of Ruvuma Region in southwestern Tanzania. It is located along the A19 road. The city has a population of 286,285, and is the seat of the Roman Catholic Archdiocese of Songea. Between 1905 and 1907, the city was a centre of African resistance during the Maji Maji Rebellion in German East Africa. The city is poised to experience significant economic growth in the near future as the Mtwara Corridor opens up in a few years. It is projected to be the sixth fastest growing city on the African continent between 2020 and 2025, with a 5.74% growth.

== History ==
The city took its names after one of the Ngoni warriors, killed in 1906 during the time of German repression of the Maji Maji rebellion.

After the Second World War, the area was marked for rapid agricultural development linked to the ultimately disastrous groundnut scheme. A railway had been planned from the coast to Songea and actually appeared in 1950s high school geography text books. During the liberation war with Mozambique the Songea area was a restricted zone and occasionally suffered aerial attacks by Portuguese forces. Its remoteness made it vulnerable to ivory poaching, and communications remained unreliable until 1985 when a new British funded road was opened linking it northwards to the road and rail hub of Makambako.

Songea became a municipality in 2006.

== Education ==
Songea is the home to many educational institutions including;

1. Matogoro Teachers Colleges
2. Peramiho School of Nursing
3. Kigonsera High School
4. Songea Boys Secondary School
5. Songea Girls Secondary School
6. Peramiho Girls School
7. The St. Augustine University
8. The Ghetto brand College

== Administration ==
Songea is coextensive with Songea Urban District and is divided into wards. It is managed by the Songea Municipal Council.

== Climate ==
Climate data for Songea (1991–2020)
Month	Jan	Feb	Mar	Apr	May	Jun	Jul	Aug	Sep	Oct	Nov	Dec	Year
Mean daily maximum °C (°F)	28.0 (82.4)	28.1 (82.6)	27.6 (81.7)	26.5 (79.7)	25.9 (78.6)	24.6 (76.3)	24.0 (75.2)	25.6 (78.1)	27.8 (82.0)	29.6 (85.3)	30.4 (86.7)	28.8 (83.8)	27.2 (81.0)
Daily mean °C (°F)	23.1 (73.6)	23.0 (73.4)	22.8 (73.0)	21.8 (71.2)	20.8 (69.4)	18.5 (65.3)	18.3 (64.9)	19.7 (67.5)	21.7 (71.1)	23.5 (74.3)	24.6 (76.3)	23.6 (74.5)	21.8 (71.2)
Mean daily minimum °C (°F)	18.4 (65.1)	18.2 (64.8)	18.0 (64.4)	16.9 (62.4)	14.3 (57.7)	11.7 (53.1)	11.2 (52.2)	12.7 (54.9)	14.7 (58.5)	17.0 (62.6)	18.5 (65.3)	18.7 (65.7)	15.9 (60.6)
Average precipitation mm (inches)	262.3 (10.33)	221.0 (8.70)	226.8 (8.93)	98.8 (3.89)	9.6 (0.38)	1.1 (0.04)	0.3 (0.01)	1.2 (0.05)	1.9 (0.07)	6.6 (0.26)	51.6 (2.03)	175.7 (6.92)	1,056.9 (41.61)
Average rainy days (≥ 1.0 mm)	17.7	14.5	17.3	9.6	1.8	0.4	0.1	0.4	0.4	1.0	4.2	12.7	80.1
Source 1: NOAA
Source 2: Tokyo Climate Center (mean temperatures 1991–2020)
