= Mtwara–Mbamba Bay Road =

Road in Tanzania

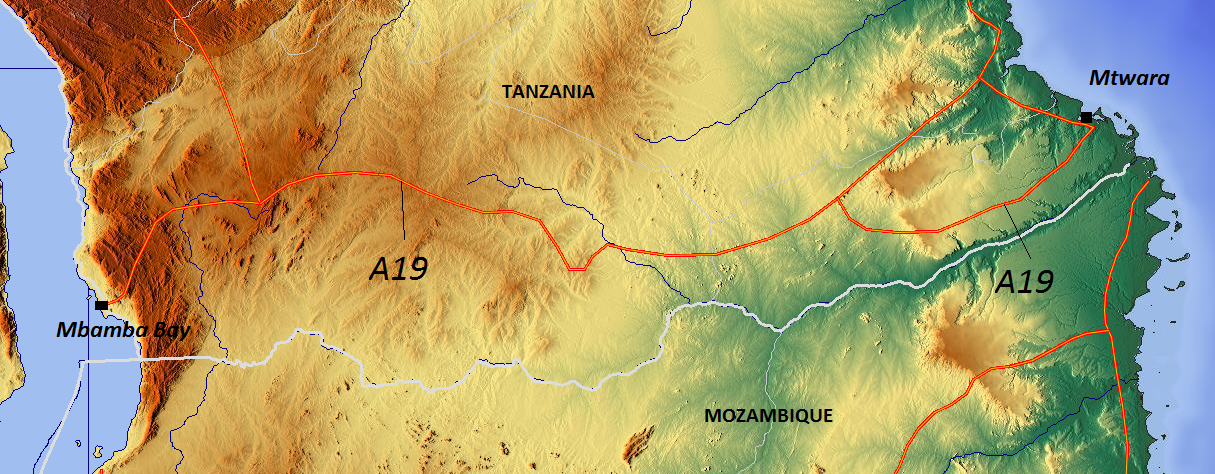

Route information
- Length: 507 mi (816 km)

Major junctions
- East end: Mtwara
- Masasi; Tunduru; Songea
- West end: Mbamba Bay

Location
- Country: Tanzania

Highway system
- Transport in Tanzania

The Mtwara–Mbamba Bay Road, also called the A19 Road, connects the city of Mtwara on the Indian Ocean coast, to the town of Mbamba Bay on the eastern coast of Lake Malawi. It is a busy and important transport corridor in the southern regions of Tanzania. It is also an integral part of the Mtwara Development Corridor that spans four Southern African countries; Malawi, Mozambique, Tanzania and Zambia.

== Location ==
The road starts in downtown Mtwara at the junction with the Mtwara–Dar es Salaam Road (B2 Road). From there, it progresses in a southwesterly direction to the town of Masasi. At Masasi it continues in a westerly direction through Tunduru and Songea. At Songea, it turns southwesterly again, to end at Mbanda Bay. The total length of the road, from end to end is approximately 816 kilometres (507 mi).

== Overview ==
As of 2019, the section of this road from Mtwara to Mbinga, in Ruvuma Region, was already sealed with bitumen. In April 2019, John Pombe Magufuli, the President of Tanzania, officially flagged off the beginning of the upgrade of the 67 kilometres (42 mi) section between Mbinga and Mbanda Bay. Improvements include (a) widening the carriageway to 7 metres (23 ft) (b) digging culverts and drainage channels (c) improving the surface to class II bitumen standard. The work is expected to conclude in 2021.

== Mtwara Development Corridor ==
The Road is a key road in the Mtwara Development Corridor project and will involve the rehabilitation of the road and a parallel rail link between Mtwara and Mbamba Bay. Other proposed developments include the laying of either a crude oil pipeline or a refined petroleum products pipeline along the same route. Discussions between stakeholders have been going on for over 20 years.
