= Ruvuma Region =

Region of Tanzania

Ruvuma Region Mkoa wa Ruvuma (Swahili)
- Region
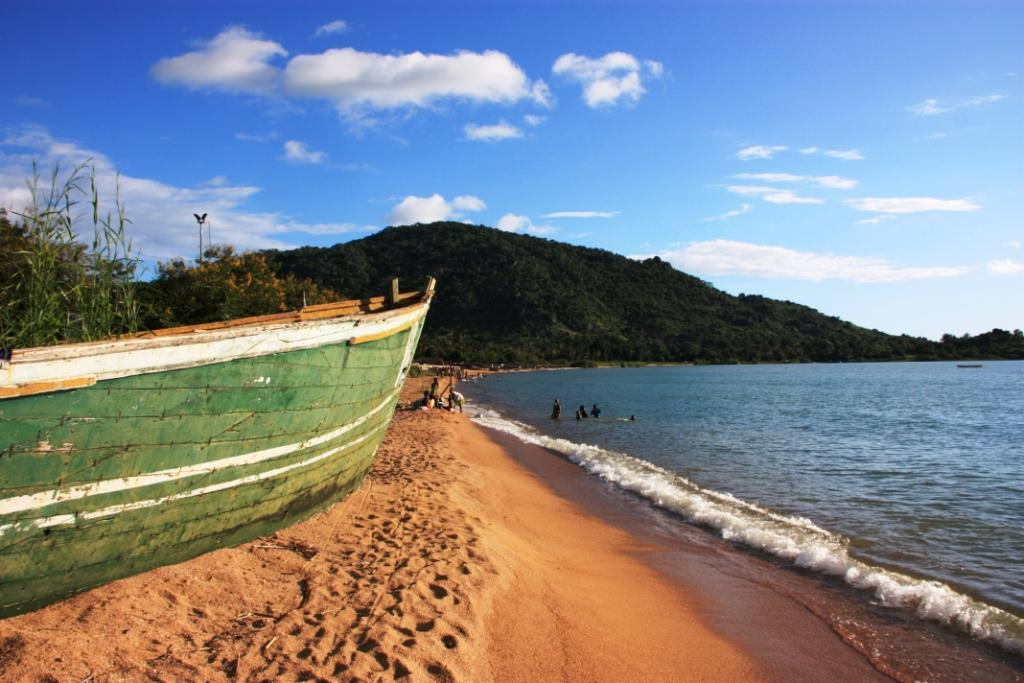
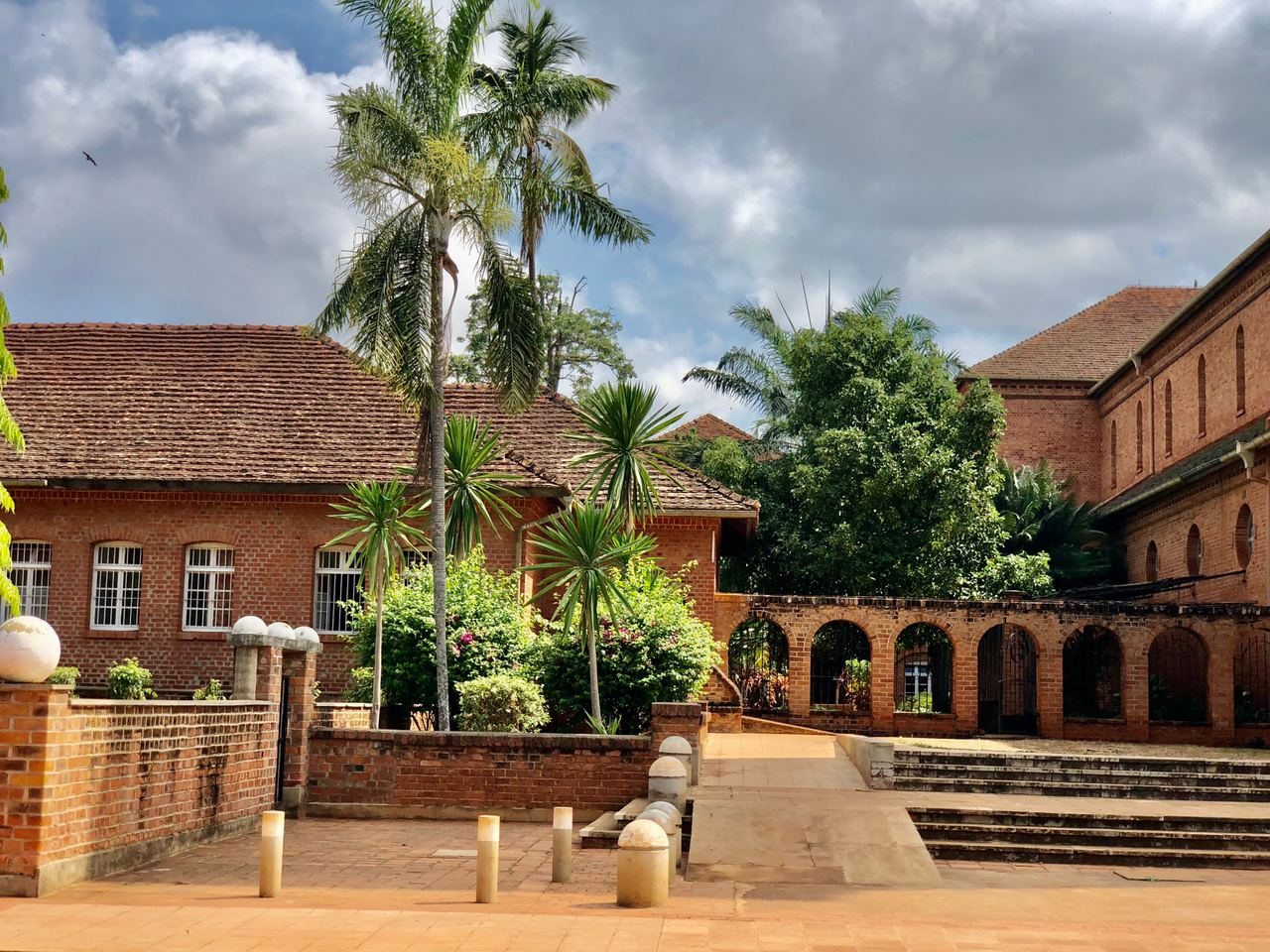
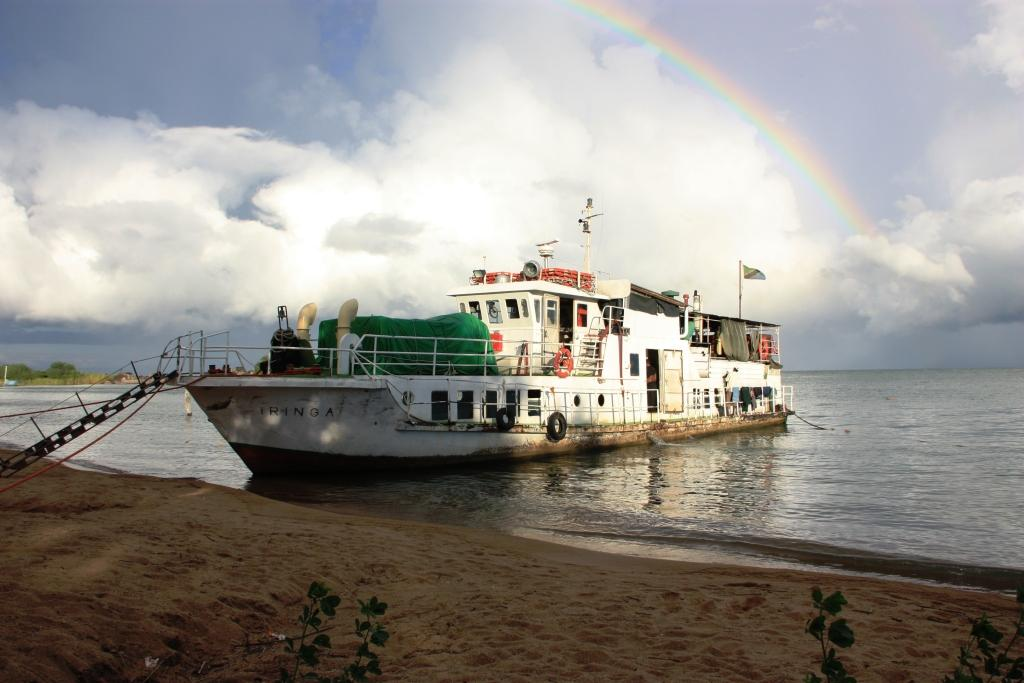
- From top to bottom: Beach scene at Mbamba bay on Lake Nyasa, Peramiho Hospital in Songea & MV Iringa at the Port of Liuli
- Nickname: The pearl of Lake Nyasa
- Location in Tanzania
- Coordinates: 10°41′16.44″S 36°15′47.16″E
- Country: Tanzania
- Zone: Southern Highlands
- Capital: Songea
- Districts: List: Mbinga District; Namtumbo District; Songea Urban District; Songea Rural District; Tunduru District; Nyasa District

Government
  - Regional Commissioner: Laban Elias Thomas (CCM)

Area
  - Total: 63,669 km^{2} (24,583 sq mi)
  - Land: 33,825 km^{2} (13,060 sq mi)
  - Water: 29,844 km^{2} (11,523 sq mi) 46.8%
  - Rank: 4th of 31
- Highest elevation (Lukukura): 1,769 m (5,804 ft)

Population (2022)
  - Total: 1,848,794
  - Rank: 19th of 31
  - Density: 54.658/km^{2} (141.56/sq mi)
- Demonym: Ruvuman

Ethnic groups
  - Settler: Swahili
  - Native: Ngoni, Matengo, Magwangara, Manda, Ndendeule, Ngindo & Yao
- Time zone: UTC+3 (EAT)
- Postcode: 57xxx
- Area code: 025
- ISO 3166 code: TZ-21
- HDI (2021): 0.555 medium · 11th of 25
- Website: Official website
- Symbols of Tanzania
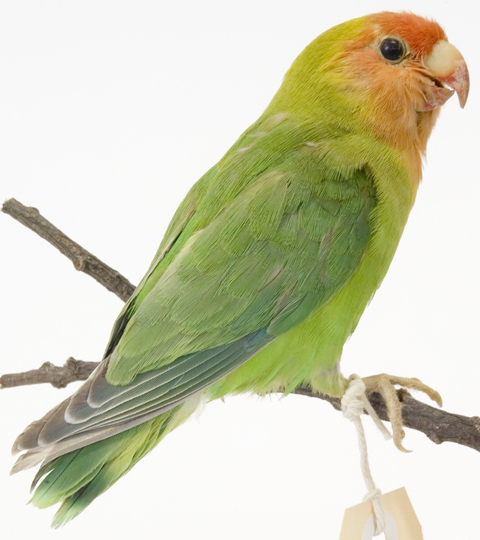
- Bird: Nyasa lovebird

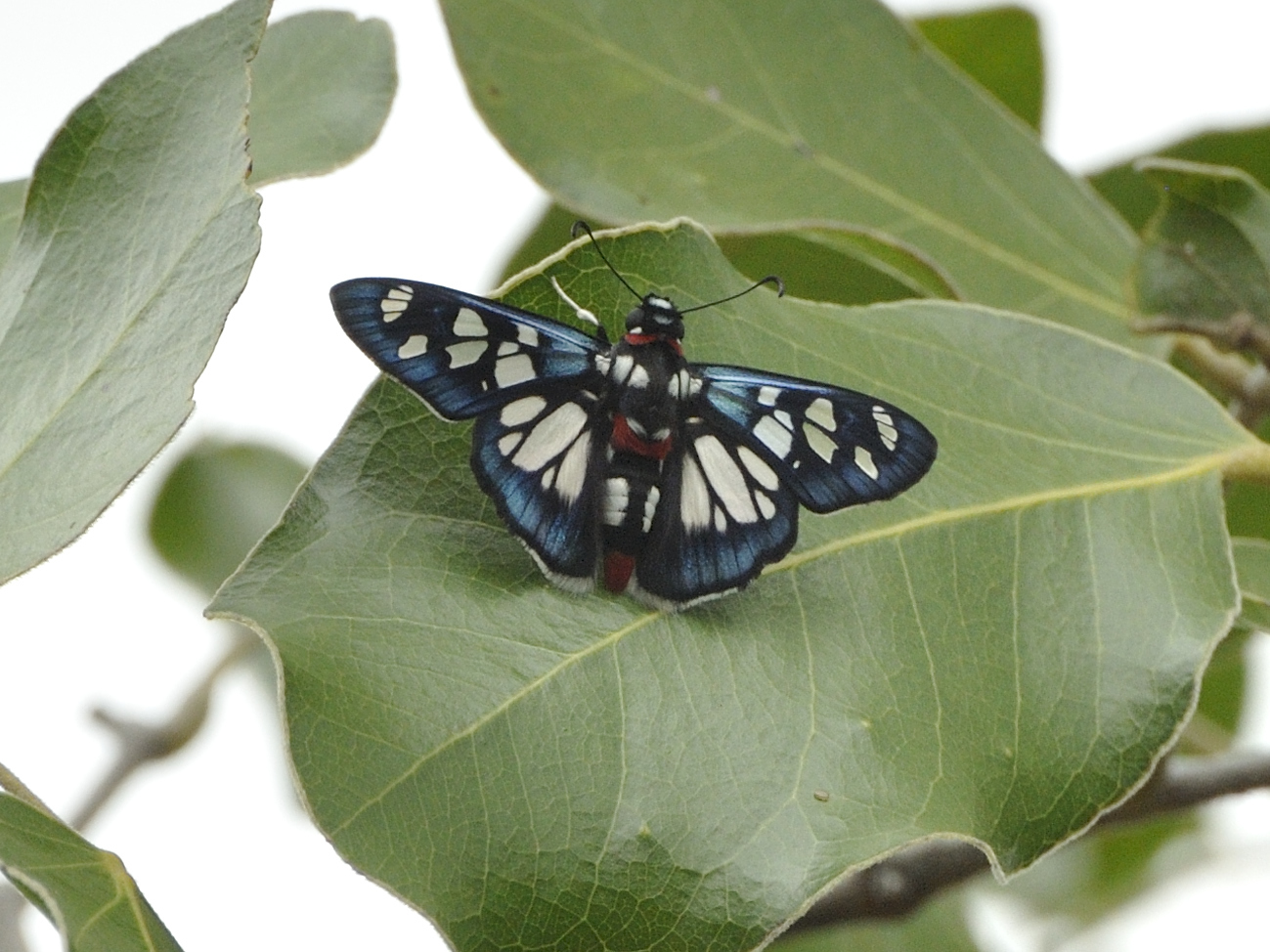
- Butterfly: Zambezi paradise skipper

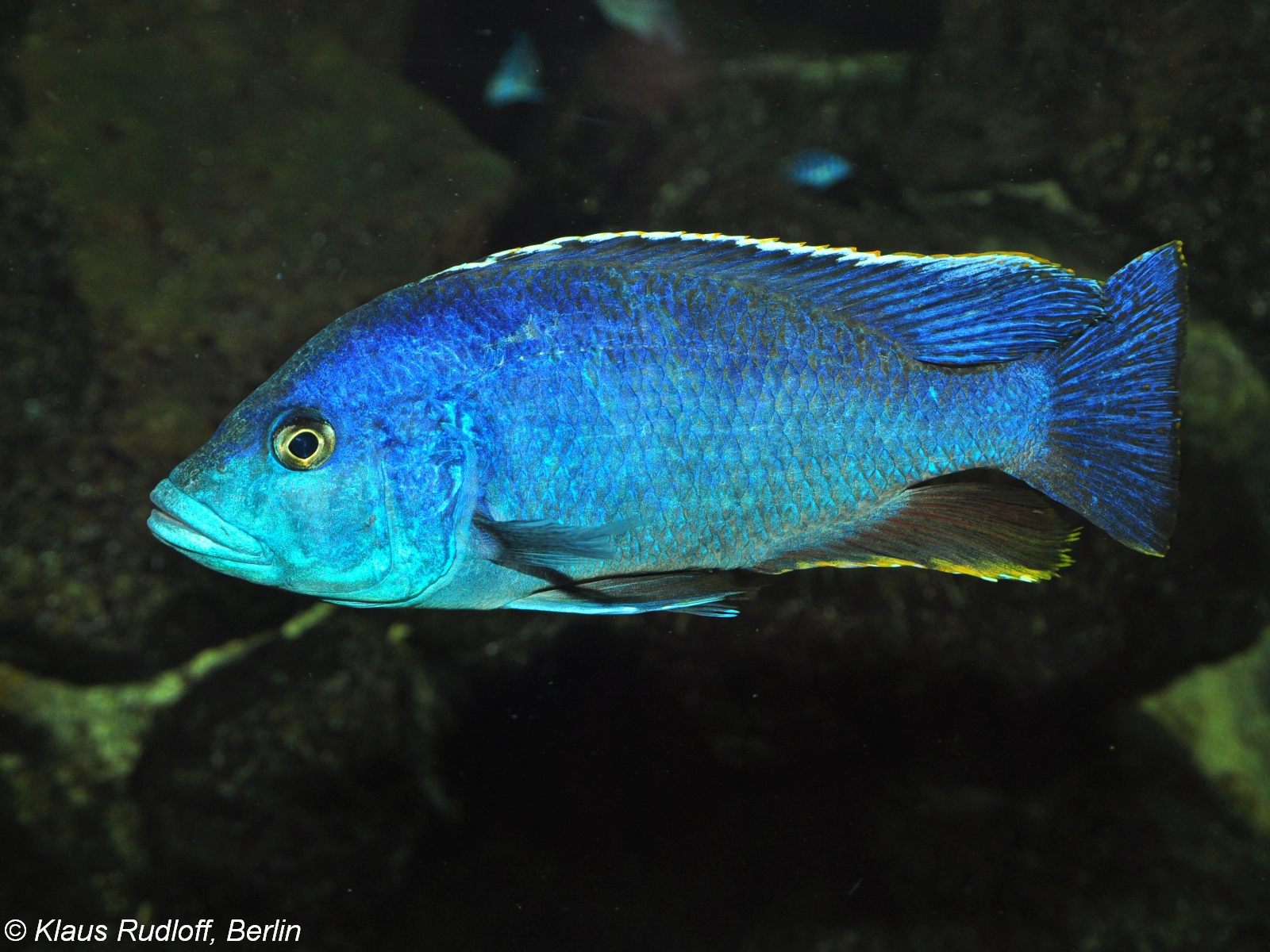
- Fish: Aulonocara nyassae

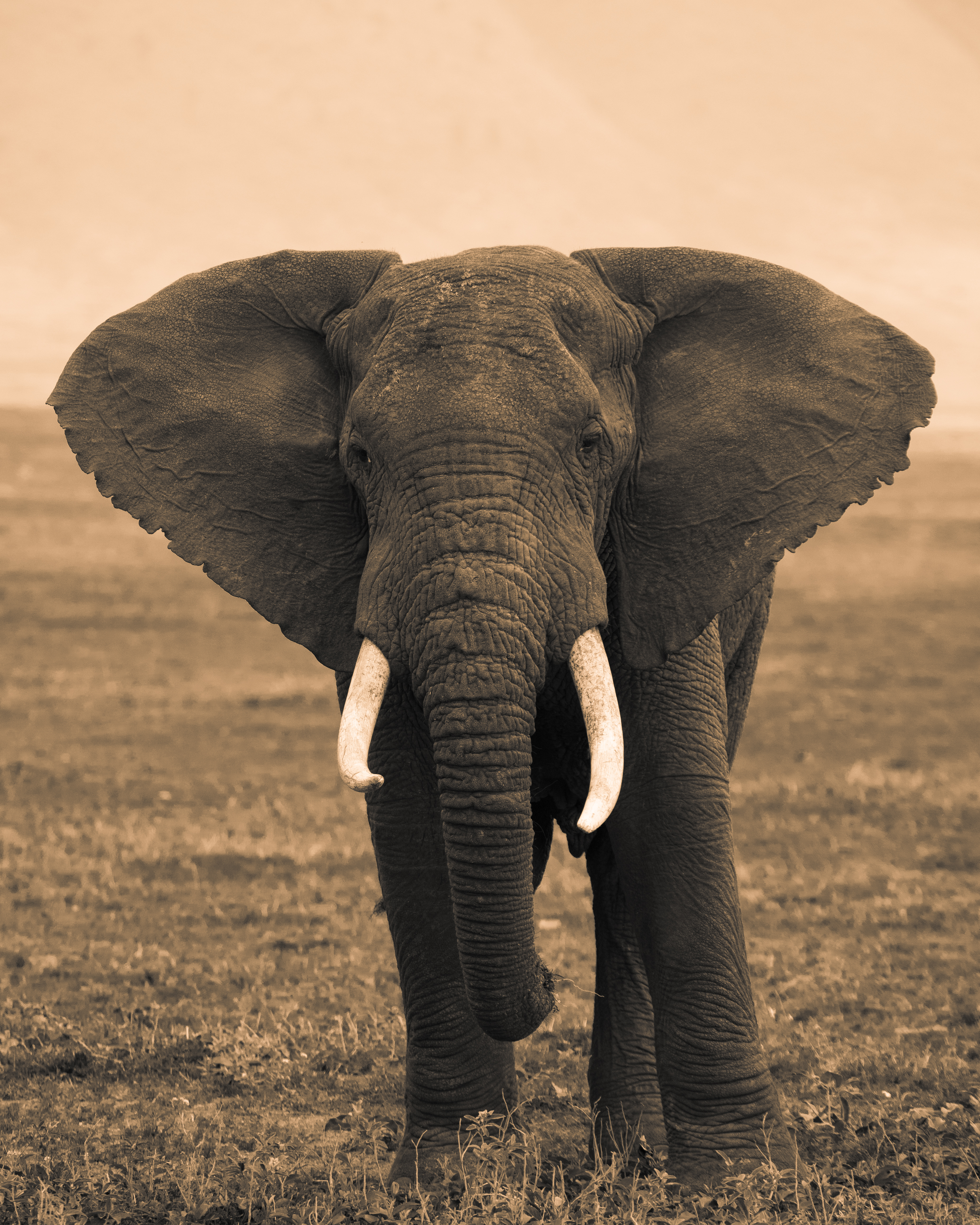
- Mammal: African Bush elephant

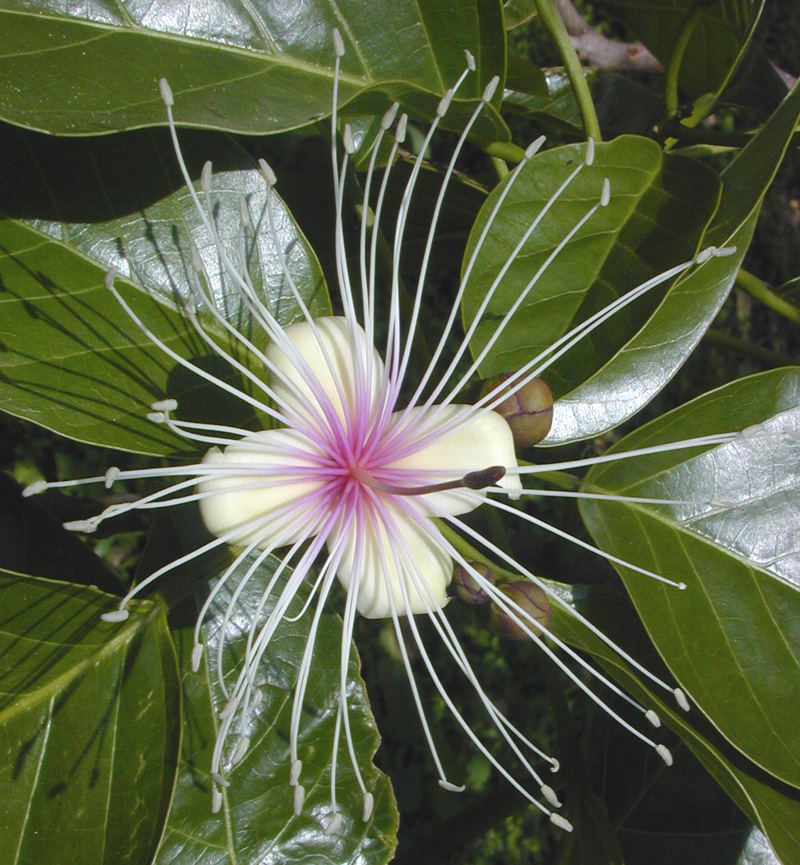
- Tree: Sacred garlic pear

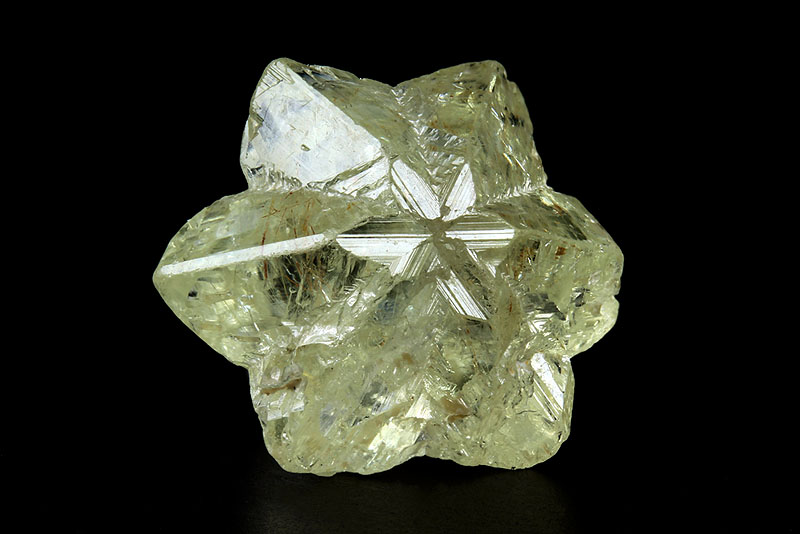
- Mineral: Alexandrite

Ruvuma Region (Swahili: Mkoa wa Ruvuma) is one of Tanzania's 31 administrative regions. The region covers a land area of 63,669 km^{2} (24,583 sq mi), comparable in size to the nation state of Latvia. The region is also bordered to the north by the Morogoro Region, to the northeast by the Lindi Region, to the east by the Mtwara Region, to the west by Lake Nyasa with Malawi and to the northwest by the Njombe Region. The regional capital is the municipality of Songea.

According to the 2012 national census, the region had a population of 1,376,891, which was lower than the pre-census projection of 1,449,830. For 2002–2012, the region's 2.1 percent average annual population growth rate was the twentieth highest in the country. It was also the 28th most densely populated region with 22 inhabitants per square kilometre (57/sq mi).

== Etymology ==
The region is named after the Ruvuma River, the second longest river in Tanzania, which forms most of its southern boundary with Niassa province of Mozambique (where it is known as "Rovuma").

== Geography ==
Ruvuma Region is located in the Southern Highlands, which range between 300 and 2000 meters above sea level. Lake Nyasa, which is located in the Western arm of the Great Rift Valley, covers the western portion of the area. The Matengo Mountains ranges, which reach heights of up to 2000 meters, are to the east of the Rift Valley. In a similar vein, the Lukumburu Mountains, which can reach an elevation of 2000 meters above sea level, are located to the north. The Ruvuma River cuts across the lower plains in the region's south. The region has diverse topology. While the Lukumburu and Matengo mountains' northern and western portions climb to a height of 2,000 meters above sea level, the region's eastern lowlands are only 300 meters above sea level.

=== Climate ===
Depending on the wet or dry season and altitude, the average temperature in the Ruvuma Region is 23 °C. With lows of 13 °C, the months of June, July, and August are particularly frigid in the Mbinga District's sections near the Matengo Highlands. The hottest months are October and November, which have an average temperature of 30 °C. The area receives enough rainfall each year, excluding tough years. The annual cycle of rainfall shows a single, extended season that runs from November to May. The annual rainfall ranges from 800 to 1800 millimeters. The amount of rain varies from one district to the next, with Tunduru District typically receiving less than 900 mm of rain annually, while Mbinga District records the greatest annual average rainfall of 1,225 mm. Particularly early in the day, the location of Ruvuma experiences relatively high mean humidity. In the month of March, the humidity is approximately 88 percent during the day, while in the month of October, it may only be 37 percent at night.

=== Fauna ===
Woodlands, bushland thickets, and grasslands make up the fauna of Ruvuma Region. Arable land's typical vegetation consists of planted trees, bamboos, and shrubs. The majority of the area is covered by miombo forests, which also extend into some areas of Tunduru, Mbinga, and the rural Songea district. Plantations of eucalyptus and pine trees have been planted all around Mount Matogoro.There are three species of common trees in the area: branchstegia, julbernardia, and isoberlinia. In recent times, a sizable portion of the Ruvuma region was covered by the forests (Miombo). Lower slopes include the bushland. The growth of bushes is a result of tree-cutting, shifting cultivation, curing tobacco, and forest clearing. Due to the harmful human activities outlined above, as well as the impacts of drainage and rainfall, grasslands are typically widespread in lowlands and plateau. Ruvuma, Njuga, Ngembambili, Lukimwa, Luegu, Luhuji, Mbarang'angu, Lutukira, and Ruhuhu were just a few of the rivers in the region.

== Economy ==
According to the 2012 Population and Housing Census, approximately 75.8% of the region's population 10 years of age and older are employed in agriculture, which also provides the majority of the region's cash income from the production of coffee, beans, maize, ground nuts, paddy, potatoes, tobacco, cassava, sesame, millet, coconuts, cashew nuts, sorghum, fruits, and sunflowers. Approximately 7.5 percent of the active population work in trade and commerce, which is the second-most significant industry after agriculture. Domestic services (2.2 percent), manufacturing (1.7 percent), sales of raw foods (1.5 percent), fishing, hunting, and raising livestock (1.4 percent), and communications and transportation (2.9 percent) are the next most common occupations (0.1 percent).

=== Agriculture ===
The prevalence of smallholder peasant subsistence farming is one of the general characteristics of agriculture in the area. Smallholder farmers use improved seeds and fertilizers at a relatively higher rate than smallholder farmers in other areas, which accounts for the abundance of perennial goods like coffee (mostly grown in Mbinga District) and cashew nuts as well as annual crops like maize, sunflower, and soy beans that are reported to be marketed in large quantities (mostly in Tunduru and Namtumbo).With a 61 percent share of the planted land, maize is the most common crop, followed by cassava (19 percent), paddy (15 percent), and beans (5 percent).

The appropriateness of Ruvuma's districts for crop production varies: Songea DC has the highest percentage of maize planted land (28.9%), followed by Mbinga DC (23.7%), Namtumbo DC (12.6%), and Madaba DC (10.3 percent). It's interesting to note that, although cultivating only 4.3 percent of the total area under maize, Tunduru DC contributes 13.5 percent of the crop.Of course, Songea DC continues to lead in production, with an average of 119,640 metric tonnes produced year (28.7%), followed by Mbinga DC (20.8%) and Tunduru (56,408 metric tonnes) (13.5 percent). Namtumbo DC appeared to have the lowest productivity since, although having 12.6% of the region's planted maize area, it contributes only 8.4% of the region's total production.

Cassava is another crop that is equally significant for both food and money, and it is mostly grown in Namtumbo DC (40%) as well as Nyasa DC (24.8%), Tunduru DC (18.3%), and Songea DC (12.6 percent). Four LGAs, namely Namtumbo DC (53%), Tunduru DC (24.9%), and Nyasa DC, farm paddy (11.2 percent). Beans are mostly produced in the following districts: Madaba DC (63.9%), Songea DC (24.2%), Songea MC (7.1%), and Namtumbo DC (4.7 percent).

The Region was successful in allocating an average of 70,806 ha (or 22.7 percent of the Region's total land area) per year for cash crops between 2011 and 2015. Sesame is the main crop, covering 16,072 acres (or 22.7 percent). Pigeon peas (13,432 ha, 19.0%), coffee (10,037 ha, 14.2%), soy beans (9,904 ha, 14.0%), tobacco (7,045 ha, 9.9%), sunflower (6,765 ha, 9.6%), cashew nuts (5,643 ha, 8.0%), and groundnuts (5,643 ha, 8.0%) came in second and third, respectively (1,908 ha, 2.7 percent). However, in terms of output volume, tobacco (37.9%) took the top spot, followed by pigeon peas (16.6%), sesame (14.1%), cashew nuts (13%) and ground nuts (13%) as well as coffee (8.8%), soy beans (4.4%), sunflower (2.9%), and sesame (2.3 percent).

Although the bulk of ginger is sold raw, ginger production has increased in popularity in recent years, as well as some small-scale processing. Along the region's river valleys, tomatoes and other vegetables are grown. The region has roughly 197,108.2 ha that seem to be ideal for irrigated farming, however only 7,385.3 ha (equal to 3.7 percent) were utilized during the 2015 season. According to the Ministry of Agriculture, Songea DC has the largest irrigation area (34.3%), followed by Nyasa DC (25.4%) and Tunduru DC (17.3%). Madaba DC has the smallest amount of land used for irrigated agriculture (3.7 percent). Paddy, horticulture crops, maize, and sweet potatoes were the main crops irrigated.

==== Livestock and dairy ====
The number of cattle increased by 517.1% and the number of sheep increased by 25.7% between 2008 and 2012. In terms of animals, goats (272,147) outnumbered pigs (222,420), cattle (177,041), sheep (30,625), and donkeys in the area (997). Tunduru DC had a 33.3 percent share of the total cattle population in the area, followed by Mbinga DC (20.8 percent), Songea DC (13.7 percent), and Songea MC (2.5 percent). There were reportedly 181,700 ha of land suitable for grazing livestock in the area, of which about 80,600 ha (44.4 percent) were actually used. In terms of facilities for animal health, there were 48 cattle dips in 2015, however only 16 of them were operational.

The value of livestock sales climbed from roughly TZS 1.5 billion in 2013 to TZS 7.8 billion in 2015, with sales of indigenous cattle and goats accounting for the majority (85%) of the rise (12.3 percent). There is a chance to raise the percentage of sales value and the quantity of pigs and poultry. The number of units sold for hides and skins grew from 31,044 pieces in 2014 (worth TZS 203,338,200) to 43,020 pieces in 2015. (valued at TZS 259,840,800). Despite a drop in milk output from 40,891 liters in 2014 to 37,738 liters in 2015, the region saw an increase in revenue thanks to an increase in market prices from TZS 1,000 to 1,300 per liter.

=== Industry ===
The National Bureau of Statistics (NBS) states that the classification of businesses as Micro, Small, and Medium-Sized Enterprises (MSMEs) and Large is based on the capital expenditure and number of employees: Micro industries are defined as those that employ fewer than five people and have less than TZS 5 million in capital; Small-scale industries are defined as those that have more capital than TZS 5 million but less than TZS 200 million and employ fewer than 50 people; and Medium-scale industries are defined as those. There were 5,263 small-scale businesses in 2015, and 49.9% of them were engaged in milling grains, primarily maize and paddy. The following industries were welding (7.6 percent), tailoring (7.6 percent), and carpentry (28.8 percent) (6.6 percent). There were just 8 industries that processed sunflower oil (0.2 percent).

In terms of the overall number of small-scale industries, Mbinga DC was in first place (1,248 industries, 23.7 percent). Madaba DC has the fewest smallscale industries in the region, followed by Nyasa DC (22.2%) and Tunduru DC (20.4%). Nyasa DC accounted for the second-highest percentage of the region's overall industries (142 industries, 2.7 percent). Mbinga DC had the biggest concentration of food processing (25) and welding businesses, as well as 858 maize and paddy milling equipment (283). Tunduru DC had the majority of garages (80) and carpentry industries (582) whereas Nyasa DC had the most tailoring businesses (279).

=== Forestry ===
Natural forest reserves made up a total of 1,283,870 ha in the Ruvuma Region in 2015, or 20.0 percent of its 6,476,400 ha total land area. Natural forest reserves covered the largest area (540,036.6 hectares) in Namtumbo DC, followed by Tunduru DC (323,125 ha), and the smallest area (7,632 ha) in Songea MC. There were 38,075 traditional beehives between 2011 and 2015, the majority of which were in Madaba DC (16,708 beehives, or 43.9 percent), Namtumbo DC (8,950 beehives, or 23.5 percent), and Mbinga DC (6,213 beehives, 16.3 percent). The smallest number of traditional beehives was found in Mbinga TC (576 beehives, 1.5 percent).

=== Fisheries ===
The 2,979 square kilometer Lake Nyasa is the primary location for fishing operations. The waters of the Ruhuhu, Ruhuji, Lukimwa, Ruvuma, Mwambesi, Nampungu, and Muhuwesi rivers also produce a considerable number of fish through line fishing. The area distributed 3,345 fishing licenses in 2015. There are 675 unregistered fishing vessels, 1,761 registered fishing vessels, and 4,662 registered fisherman. Fish harvesting totaled 265,629 million tonnes, worth TZS 649,602,500, with the majority of it taking place in Nyasa DC, however fishing and selling are also done at modest levels in Songea DC and Namtumbo DC from the Ruvuma, Luwegu, and Londo rivers as well as from natural dams.

=== Tourism ===
The Ruvuma Region is endowed with attractions, most of which have not been developed to draw tourists. These attractions include landscape scenery, cultural attractions, the Mbamba Bay Port, unspoiled beach sites along Lake Nyasa, game hunting, historical and archaeological sites.

Sites like the Majimaji Museum and the Songea MC German historical buildings (boma) are located in the region. Muhuwesi, Undendeule, Mwambesi, Litumbandyosi, and Liparamba are the five game-controlled areas in Ruvuma. Muhuwesi and Mwambesi are in Tunduru DC, while Undendeule is in Namtumbo DC. Ruvuma has one national park (Nyerere National Park), as well as five other game-controlled regions.

=== Mining ===
Ruvuma Region contains a variety of gemstones, coal, uranium, gold, and diamonds, especially in the southernmost part of the territory. The distribution of the mineral deposits is as follows: coal is known to exist in the five basins of Ngaka, Muhukuru, Mbamba-Bay, Njuga, and Lumecha; gold is primarily thought to be present along Muhuwesi River in Tunduru DC; uranium reserves are particularly abundant in Namtumbo DC.

=== GDP ===
The Ruvuma Region's GDP increased steadily from TZS 1.6 million in 2010 to TZS 2.3 million in 2012, then hit TZS 3.0 million in 2014 before reaching TZS 3.5 million in 2015. This is according to the 2015 National Accounts of Tanzania new series statistics. Therefore, between 2010 and 2015, the economy increased by 119 percent, or 23.8 percent year on average, which is much faster than the country as a whole. In both years, the Ruvuma Region's GDP per capita in current prices placed it fourth in the Tanzanian mainland economy. From TZS 1.7 million in 2012 to TZS 2.4 million in 2015, its per capita GDP grew. It was surpassed by the top-ranking cities of Dar es Salaam, Iringa, and Arusha.

== Population ==
Wamatengo, Wangoni, Wayao, Wanyasa, Wandendeule, Wapoto, Wamanda, Wanindi and Wamatambwe are the indigenous ethnic groups in the Ruvuma Region. With more than 60% of the district's population belonging to one ethnic group, Wamatengo, they are the dominant group in Mbinga district. Along with a few Wangoni, the Wanyasa, Wamanda, and Wapoto live along Lake Nyasa's shoreline.

In Songea Urban, the Wangoni make up the majority of the ethnic groups, followed by the Wandendeule, Wamanda, Wayao, Wamatengo, and Wanyasa. Wayao constitute the majority ethnic group in Tunduru district. Additionally, Wamakua, Wandendeule, and Wamatambwe are contained inside them. The two most common ethnic groups in Songea's rural district are Wangoni and Wandendeule, who live in the Ruvuma and Ndendeule divisions, respectively. The divisions of Muhukuru, Sasawala, and Madaba are occupied by additional small ethnic groups such the Wayao, Wabena, and Wanindi.

In 2018, there were more than 1.56 million people living in the Ruvuma Region, with 74.5 percent of them living in rural areas and 25.5 percent in urban areas.

== Administrative divisions ==
=== Districts ===
Ruvuma Region is divided into five districts, each administered by a council:

Districts of Ruvuma Region
Map	District	Population (2012 Census)
	Mbinga District	353,683
	Namtumbo District	201,639
	Nyasa District	146,160
	Songea District	173,821
	Songea Municipal	203,309
	Tunduru District	298,279
	Total	1,376,891

=== Constituencies ===
For parliamentary elections, Tanzania is divided into constituencies. As of the 2010 elections, the Ruvuma Region had six constituencies:

1. Nyasa Constituency
2. Mbinga Mjini Constituency
3. Mbinga Vijijini Constituency
4. Namtumbo Constituency
5. Peramiho Constituency
6. Songea Mjini Constituency
7. Tunduru Constituency
8. Madaba Constituency

== Healthcare ==
With one health center serving 16 wards as of 2015, Mbinga TC has the greatest shortfall of health centers and dispensaries, followed by Songea DC (16 wards per health center) and Mbinga DC with an average of 15 wards per health center. However, Nyasa District 5 had a ratio of 5 wards per health facility, followed by Namtumbo DC with 4 wards per health facility. Nearly 4 mitaa are typically facilitated by each dispensary, with Madaba DC having the lowest ratio of 2 villages per dispensary. Following it were Mbinga DC, Mbinga TC, Songea DC, and Tunduru DC, each with three villages and a dispensary.

== Education ==
Although students appeared to perform better in transitioning from primary to secondary education (with passes ranging from 60.4 percent for Namtumbo DC to 71.5 percent for Mbinga), Form IV results indicated that something was wrong either at the primary or secondary school level. This is due to the fact that, of those who took the Form IV examination, less than 15% received grades in Divisions I, II, and III. A little over 50% of the remaining students received Division 0 while about 34% received Division IV (failed).

=== Vocational training ===
Only nine vocational training facilities existed in the area up to 2015, and they were situated in Mbinga TC, Namtumbo DC, Songea DC, and Tunduru DC. In all, 476 Vocational Skills Training (VST) students graduated in 2015; the courses provided include driving, electrical installation and plumbing, masonry and joinery, carpentry, and tailoring. As of 2019, the Sokoine University of Agriculture (SUA) has opened branches in Nyasa DC, Tunduru DC, and Madaba DC for the training of programs relating to tourism, wildlife management, and beekeeping.

== Notable people ==
- Sidi Mubarak Bombay, Tanzanian explorer
- Rashid Kawawa, Tanzania's second Prime Minister and later second Vice President
- Godfrey Mwakikagile, Tanzanian author and scholar
- Oscar Kambona, Tanzania's first Minister of Defence and External Affairs
- Edward Said Tingatinga, Tanzanian painter
