= List of ethnic groups in Tanzania =

Tanzania’s population comprises more than 120 ethnic groups, with no single group forming a majority, contributing to a diverse cultural and linguistic landscape without including ethnic groups that reside in Tanzania as refugees from conflicts in nearby countries. These ethnic groups are of Bantu origin, with large Nilotic-speaking, moderate indigenous, and small non-African minorities. The country lacks a clear dominant ethnic majority: the largest ethnic group in Tanzania, the Sukuma people, comprises about 16 percent of the country's total population, followed by the Wanyakyusa, and the Chagga. Unlike its neighbouring countries, Tanzania has not experienced large-scale ethnic conflicts, a fact attributed to the unifying influence of the Swahili language.

The ethnic groups mentioned here are mostly differentiated based on ethnolinguistic lines. They may sometimes be referred to together with noun class prefixes appropriate for ethnonyms: this can be either a prefix from the ethnic group's native language (if Bantu), or the Swahili prefix wa.

Ethnic group	Region	District	Ethnolinguistic group	Notes
Alagwa	Dodoma Region	Kondoa District	Cushite	The community is associated with the arts of rainmaking, despite being 99% Muslim.
Akie	Manyara Region	Simanjiro District	Khoisan	The Akie, like all other hunter-gatherer persons in Tanzania and Kenya, are sometimes referred to as "Dorobo" or "Wandorobo", which is disparaging and false.
Barabaig	Manyara Region	Hanang District	Nilotic	
Assa	Manyara Region	Kiteto District	Cushite	
Arusha	Arusha Region	Arusha District	Nilotic	
Bembe	Katavi Region	Mpanda District	Bantu	
Bena	Njombe Region	Njombe District	Bantu	
Bende	Katavi Region	Mpanda District	Bantu	
Bondei	Tanga Region	Pangani District & Muheza District	Bantu	
Bungu	Mbeya Region	Chunya District	Bantu	
Burunge	Dodoma Region	Kondoa District	Cushite	
Chagga	Kilimanjaro Region	Siha District, Moshi District, Moshi Rural District, Rombo District & Hai District	Bantu	
Datooga	Arusha Region	Karatu District	Nilotic	
Dhaiso	Tanga Region	Muheza District	Bantu	
Digo	Tanga Region	Mkinga District & Tanga District	Bantu	
Doe	Pwani Region	Chalinze District	Bantu	
Fipa	Rukwa Region	Nkasi District & Sumbawanga District	Bantu	
Gogo	Dodoma Region	Chamwino District, Chemba District, Bahi District, Kongwa District & Mpwapwa District	Bantu	
Goma people	Kigoma Region	Kigoma-Ujiji District & Kigoma District	Bantu	
Gorowa	Dodoma Region	Kondoa District	Cushite	
Ha	Kigoma Region	Kasulu District & Kibondo District	Bantu	
Hadimu	Zanzibar	Kati District, Kaskazini A District , Kaskazini B District, Mjini District & Kusini District	Bantu	
Hadza	Arusha Region	Karatu District	Khoisan	
Hangaza	Kagera Region	Ngara District	Bantu	
Haya	Kagera Region	Muleba District, Bukoba Rural District, Bukoba District, & Missenyi District	Bantu	
Hehe	Iringa Region	Iringa District, Kilolo District, Mufindi District & Iringa Urban District	Bantu	
Holoholo people	Kigoma Region	Uvinza District	Bantu	
Ikizu	Mara Region	Bunda District	Bantu	
Ikoma	Mara Region	Serengeti District & Butiama District	Bantu	
Iraqw	Manyara Region	Hanang District, Babati District & Mbulu District	Cushite	
Isanzu	Singida Region	Mkalama District	Bantu	
Jiji	Kigoma Region	Kigoma-Ujiji District	Bantu	
Jita	Mara Region	Rorya District	Bantu	
Joluo	Mara Region	Butiama District, Musoma Urban, Rorya District & Tarime District	Nilotic	
Kaguru	Morogoro Region	Gairo District & Kilosa District	Bantu	
Kami	Pwani Region	Kisarawe District	Bantu	
Kara	Mwanza Region	Ukerewe District	Bantu	
Kerewe	Mwanza Region	Ukerewe District	Bantu	
Kimbu	Mbeya Region	Chunya District	Bantu	
Kinga	Njombe Region	Makete District	Bantu	
Kisi	Njombe Region	Makete District	Bantu	
Konongo	Katavi Region	Mpanda District	Bantu	
Kuria	Mara Region	Tarime District	Bantu	
Kutu	Morogoro Region	Morogoro Rural District	Bantu	
Kw'adza	Manyara Region	Mbulu District	Cushite	
Kwaya	Mara Region	Musoma Rural District	Bantu	
Lambya	Songwe Region	Momba District	Bantu	
Luguru	Morogoro Region	Mvomero District & Morogoro Rural District	Bantu	
Lungu	Rukwa Region	Kalambo District	Bantu	
Maasai	Manyara Region & Arusha Region	Ngorongoro District, Kiteto District, Simanjiro District, Longido District, Monduli District & Arusha District	Nilotic	
Machinga	Lindi Region	Lindi District & Kilwa District	Bantu	
Magoma	Njombe Region	Makete District	Bantu	
Mahanji	Njombe Region	Makete District	Bantu	
Makonde	Mtwara Region & Lindi Region	Mtwara-Mikindani District, Mtwara District, Ruangwa District, Nachingwea District, Masasi District, Lindi District, Tandahimba District & Newala District	Bantu	
Makua	Mtwara Region	Newala District & Tandahimba District	Bantu	
Malila	Songwe Region	Momba District	Bantu	
Mambwe	Rukwa Region	Kalambo District	Bantu	
Manyema	Kigoma Region	Kigoma District	Bantu	
Manda	Njombe Region	Ludewa District	Bantu	
Meru	Arusha Region	Meru District	Bantu	
Matengo	Ruvuma Region	Mbinga District	Bantu	
Matumbi	Lindi Region	Kilwa District	Bantu	
Maviha	Mtwara Region	Mtwara District	Bantu	
Mbugwe	Manyara Region	Babati District	Bantu	
Mbunga	Iringa Region	Kilolo District	Bantu	
Mbugu people	Tanga Region	Lushoto District	Bantu	
Mpoto	Ruvuma Region	Mbinga District	Bantu	
Mwera	Lindi Region	Kilwa District	Bantu	
Ndali	Songwe Region	Momba District	Bantu	
Ndamba	Iringa Region	Kilolo District	Bantu	
Ndendeule	Ruvuma Region	Namtumbo District	Bantu	
Ndengereko	Pwani Region	Mkuranga District, Kisarawe District & Rufiji District	Bantu	
Ndonde	Lindi Region	Nachingwea District	Bantu	
Ngasa	Kilimanjaro Region	Rombo District	Bantu	
Ngindo	Lindi Region	Liwale District	Bantu	
Ngoni	Ruvuma Region	Songea District	Bantu	
Ngulu	Tanga Region	Kilindi District	Bantu	
Ngurimi	Mara Region	Serengeti District & Tarime District	Bantu	
Iramba	Singida Region & Shinyanga Region	Iramba District & Kishapu District	Bantu	
Nindi	Ruvuma Region	Songea District	Bantu	
Nyakyusa	Mbeya Region	Kyela District & Rungwe District	Bantu	
Kwere	Rukwa Region	Nkasi District & Sumbawanga District	Bantu	
Nyambo	Kagera Region	Karagwe District	Bantu	
Nyamwanga	Songwe Region	Momba District	Bantu	
Nyamwezi	Tabora Region & Shinyanga Region	Urambo District, Kaliua District, Sikonge District, Nzega District, Kahama District, Shinyanga District, Uyui District & Igunga District	Bantu	
Nyanyembe	Tabora Region	Uyui District	Bantu	
Nyaturu	Singida Region	Ikungi District & Manyoni District	Bantu	
Nyiha	Mbeya Region	Mbozi District	Bantu	
Pangwa	Njombe Region	Ludewa District	Bantu	
Pare	Kilimanjaro Region	Mwanga District & Same District	Bantu	
Pimbwe	Katavi Region	Mpimbwe District & Mlele District	Bantu	
Pogolo	Morogoro Region	Kilombero District	Bantu	
Rangi	Dodoma Region	Kondoa District	Bantu	
Rufiji	Pwani Region	Rufiji District, Mafia District & Kibiti District	Bantu	
Rungwa	Katavi Region	Mpanda District	Bantu	
Safwa	Mbeya Region	Mbeya District & Rungwe District	Bantu	
Sagara	Morogoro Region	Kilosa District	Bantu	
Sandawe	Dodoma Region	Chemba District	Khoisan	
Sangu	Mbeya Region	Chunya District	Bantu	
Segeju	Tanga Region	Mkinga District	Bantu	
Shambaa	Tanga Region	Korogwe District, Bumbuli District & Lushoto District	Bantu	
Shirazi	Zanzibar	Kati District, Kaskazini A District , Kaskazini B District, Mjini District & Kusini District	Bantu	
Shubi	Kagera Region	Ngara District	Bantu	
Suba	Mara Region	Rorya District	Bantu	
Sukuma	Mwanza Region, Simiyu Region, Geita Region & Shinyanga Region	Ilemela District, Kwimba District , Magu District, Misungwi District, Nyamagana District, Sengerema District , Geita District, Nyang'hwale District, Bariadi District, Busega District , Itilima District, Maswa District, Meatu District Shinyanga District, Kahama District , Kishapu District, Msalala District, Ushetu District & Mbogwe District	Bantu	
Sumbwa	Geita Region	Bukombe District	Bantu	
Swahili	All regions	All districts	Bantu	
Sonjo	Arusha Region	Ngorongoro District	Bantu	
Tongwe	Kigoma Region	Uvinza District	Bantu	
Tumbuka	Rukwa Region	Nkasi District & Sumbawanga District	Bantu	
Vidunda	Morogoro Region	Kilosa District	Bantu	
Vinza	Kigoma Region	Uvinza District	Bantu	
Wanda	Rukwa Region	Sumbawanga District	Bantu	
Wanji	Njombe Region	Makete District	Bantu	
Ware	Mara Region	Rorya District	Bantu	
Yao	Ruvuma Region	Tunduru District & Namtumbo District	Bantu	
Zanaki	Mara Region	Butiama District & Bunda District	Bantu	
Zaramo	Dar es Salaam Region & Pwani Region	Ilala District, Temeke District, Ubungo District , Kigamboni District, Kinondoni District, Bagamoyo District, Kibaha District , Chalinze District, Kisarawe District, Mkuranga District, Mafia District & Kibiti District	Bantu	
Zigua	Tanga Region & Pwani Region	Handeni District, Muheza District, Chalinze District, Kilindi District, Korogwe District & Pangani District	Bantu	
Zinza	Geita Region & Mwanza Region	Sengerema District, Geita District & Chato District	Bantu	

Other groups:

Ethnic group	Region	District	Ethnolinguistic group
Gujarati	Dar es Salaam Region	Ilala District	Indo-Aryan
