= Kinga =

Kinga is a female name, a variant of Kunigunde. It may refer to:

== People ==
- Kinga of Poland, Hungarian saint
- Kinga people, an ethnicity in Tanzania

=== Surname ===
- Sonam Kinga, Bhutanese actor
- Yukari Kinga, Japanese footballer

=== Given name ===
- Kinga Achruk, Polish handball player
- Kinga Augustyn, Polish violinist
- Kinga Baranowska, Polish mountaineer
- Kinga Bóta, Hungarian sprint canoer
- Kinga Choszcz, Polish travel writer
- Kinga Czuczor, Hungarian beauty pageant contestant
- Kinga Czigány, Hungarian sprint canoer
- Kinga Dékány, Hungarian sprint canoer
- Kinga Dunin, Polish writer
- Kinga Fabó, Hungarian poet
- Kinga Gajewska (born 1990), Polish politician
- Kinga Gál, Hungarian politician
- Kinga Göncz, Hungarian politician
- Kinga Grzyb, Polish handball player
- Kinga Janurik, Hungarian handballer
- Kinga Klivinyi, Hungarian handballer
- Kinga Królik (born 1999), Polish steeplechase runner
- Kinga Maculewicz-De La Fuente, French volleyball player
- Kinga Philipps, Polish actress
- Kinga Preis, Polish actress
- Kinga Rusin, Polish TV presenter
- Kinga Seweryn (born 2005), Polish footballer
- Kinga Székely, Hungarian geographer, cartographer
- Kinga Tshering, Bhutanese politician
- Kinga Wojtasik, Polish beach volleyball player
- Kinga Zsigmond, Hungarian javelin thrower

== Animals ==
- Eupithecia kinga, a moth in the family Geometridae

== Other ==
- Kinga people, an ethnic and linguistic group from Njombe Region, Tanzania
- Kinga language, a Bantu language of Tanzania
