= Datooga =

Datooga may refer to:

- the Datooga people
- the Datooga language
