= Kisi =

Kisi may refer to:

- Kisi people of Tanzania
- Kisi language (Tanzania)
- Kisi, Kenya, a town in Nyanza Province
- Kisi, Oyo, a town in Nigeria
- Kissi language of Guinea, Sierra Leone, and Liberia in West Africa
- Kyiv National University of Construction and Architecture, formerly Kiev Civil Engineering Institute (abbr. KISI)
- Kisi (grape), a Georgian wine grape
- * An alternative spelling for a kishie, a type pack basket native to the Shetland Islands.
