= Mwana wa Mwana Island =

Island in Unguja North Region of Zanzibar, Tanzania

- Location within Tanzania

Geography
- Location: Zanzibar Channel
- Coordinates: 05°45′34″S 39°13′14″E
- Archipelago: Zanzibar Archipelago
- Adjacent to: Indian Ocean
- Area: 0.3 km^{2} (0.12 sq mi)
- Length: 1.1 km (0.68 mi)
- Width: 0.472 km (0.2933 mi)

Administration
- Tanzania
- Region: Unguja North Region
- District: Kaskazini A District

Demographics
- Languages: Swahili
- Ethnic groups: Hadimu, Bondei

Mwana wa Mwana Island (Kisiwa cha Mwana wa Mwana, in Swahili) is an island located in Mtakuja ward of Kaskazini A District in Unguja North Region, Tanzania.

The island is situated at the northernmost tip of Tumbatu, where the first inhabitants—sailors from the north of the mainland—arrived (Most likely Bondei of Tanga). One of them was a young woman who was expecting. They stopped travelling and stayed for a few years, constructing additional shelters at that time. The word Mwana in Swahili means child, and it describes a young, pregnant lady who is not married. Mwana gave birth to a child named Mwana a few days later. For this reason, the location is known as "Mwana wa Mwana," which translates to "the child of Mwana."
