= Tumbatu Island Lighthouse =

- Location: Tumbatu Island; Zanzibar Archipelago; Tanzania
- Coordinates: 5°45′20.6″S 39°13′12.4″E

Tower
- Constructed: 1889
- Construction: stone tower
- Height: 23 metres (75 ft)
- Shape: 6-stage square tower with balcony and lantern
- Markings: unpainted white stone
- Operator: Zanzibar Ports Corporation

Light
- Focal height: 26 metres (85 ft)
- Range: 14 nautical miles (26 km; 16 mi)
- Characteristic: Fl W 10s.

The Tumbatu Lighthouse (also known as the Mwana Wa Mwana lighthouse) is located on Tumbatu Island in Zanzibar, Tanzania. The lighthouse is one of the oldest lighthouses in the country and is a six-stage stone tower located on the northern tip of the island.

== See also ==
- List of lighthouses in Tanzania
