= Abeid =

Abeid is both a surname and a given name. Notable people with the name include:

- Aly Abeid (born 1997), Mauritanian footballer
- Bahati Ali Abeid (born 1967), Tanzanian politician
- Mehdi Abeid (born 1992), Algerian footballer
- Kaluta Amri Abeid (1924–1964), Tanzanian Muslim cleric (Sheikh), civil servant, politician and poet
- Abeid Karume (1905–1972), President of Zanzibar
