= Cunégonde =

Fictional character in Voltaire's novel Candide

Cunégonde is a fictional character in Voltaire's 1759 novel Candide. She is the title character's aristocratic cousin and love interest.

At the beginning of the story, the protagonist Candide is chased away from his uncle's home after he is caught kissing and fondling Cunégonde. Shortly afterwards, Cunégonde's family is attacked by a band of marauding soldiers, and she is taken prisoner. However, Cunégonde soon becomes the mistress of two wealthy Portuguese men who decide to share her between them. Candide kills the two men and he, Cunégonde and the Old Woman (Cunégonde's servant) flee to Buenos Aires.

There, Cunégonde becomes the mistress of the provincial governor. Since Candide is wanted for the murders of the two Portuguese men, he is forced to leave her in Buenos Aires. However, he vows to find her and marry her. Finally, near the end of the novel, Candide finds Cunégonde in Istanbul, but she has lost her beauty, and is now very irritable and unfortunately very shallow-minded. Candide reluctantly agrees to marry her.

== Name ==
"Cunégonde" may be derived from Cunigunde of Luxembourg. However, the first part of the name may be intended as a pun, referring to the female genitalia (Latin: cunnus, French: con).

Kunigunde, Kunigunda, or Cunigunde is a European female name of German origin derived from "kuni" (clan, family) and "gund" (war). In Polish this is sometimes Kunegunda or Kinga.

== Candide (operetta) ==
In the 1956 operetta Candide written by Leonard Bernstein, Cunegonde is a soprano, who sings one of the most difficult arias written for the theatre: "Glitter and Be Gay". The role has been portrayed by skilled actresses such as Barbara Cook, who originated the role in 1956, Madeline Kahn, Kristin Chenoweth, June Anderson, Harolyn Blackwell, and Maureen Brennan, who received a Tony Award nomination and won the Theatre World Award for her performance in the 1974 Broadway revival.
