= Tumbatu Island =

Island in Unguja North, Zanzibar, Tanzania

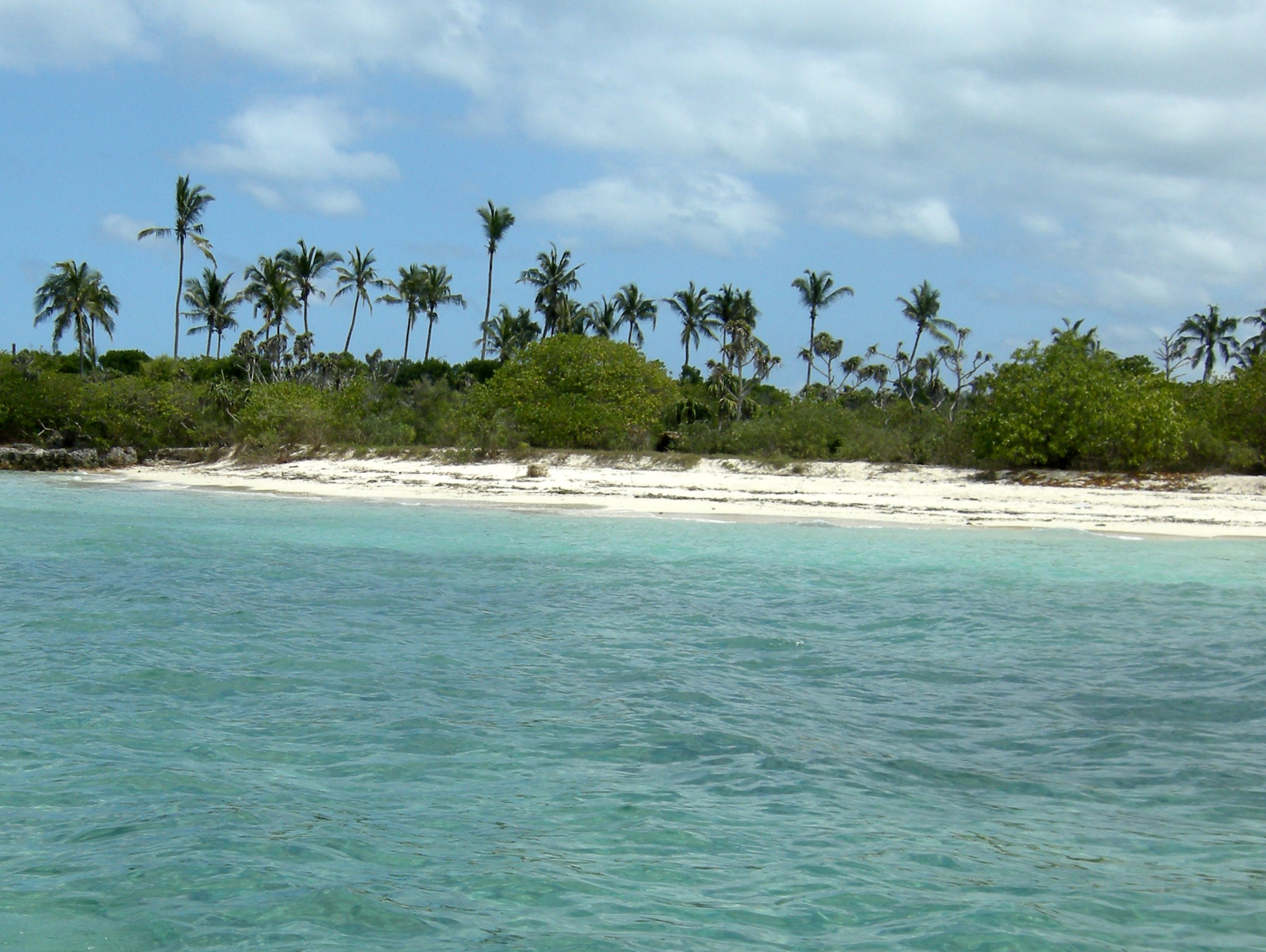
- Beach on Tumbatu Island

- Location within Tanzania

Geography
- Location: Zanzibar Channel
- Coordinates: 05°49′06″S 39°13′20″E
- Archipelago: Zanzibar Archipelago
- Adjacent to: Indian Ocean
- Length: 10.14 km (6.301 mi)
- Width: 3.0 km (1.86 mi)

Administration
- Tanzania
- Region: Unguja North Region
- District: Kaskazini A District

Demographics
- Languages: Swahili
- Ethnic groups: Hadimu

Tumbatu Island (Kisiwa cha Tumbatu, in Swahili) is an island located in Fumba ward of Kaskazini A District in Unguja North Region, Tanzania. In Zanzibar Archipelago, Tumbatu is the third-largest island, after Pemba and Unguja island. The Island is amanitered by three wards; Tumbatu Jongowe, Uvivini and Mtakuja. As of right now, the island is home to two major settlements: the village of Jongowe in the southern end of the island and the town of Kichangani, also known as Gomani, on the northern end.

Tumbatu is a little bit isolated from the rest of Zanzibar despite having a southern side that is only 2 km (1.2 miles) long and surrounded by a reef from Mkokotoni on the island. Tumbatu Island has two islets, Popo Island to the east and Mwana wa Mwana Island to the north. The island has an average elevation of 12 m (39 ft). The Island is the native home of a sub cultural group of the Hadimu known as the Tumbatu.

== History ==
The Hadimu, Pemba, and Tumbatu are regarded as Zanzibar's "indigenous" population. According to archaeological findings, people first settled on Tumbatu 2,000 years ago. The biggest settlements are found close to Jongowe at Makutani. Tumbatu has always occupied a prominent political and economic position in the region. In Zanzibar, the Swahili settlement of Tumbatu was a "higher order" state centre from 1100 to approximately 1300 AD. It was engaged in trade with other significant city-states in the Indian Ocean. Additionally, from 1150 to 1250 AD, the town of Jongowe was one of the biggest towns on the coast of Zanzibar.

Tumbatu was still a significant regional force when the Portuguese arrived in Zanzibar in the sixteenth century, but by the time the Omani Arabs colonised Zanzibar in the late 1700s, Tumbatu's influence had significantly decreased.The Sultan of Oman relocated his Sultanate's capital to Zanzibar in 1840. Up until 1890, Zanzibar was governed by Oman; however, the island was formally designated a protectorate of Britain. Because of their remote location from the capital and the unsuitability of their soil for the plantation cultivation practised in central Unguja, the Tumbatu people managed to maintain a degree of relative independence during this period.

When Seyyid Said bin Sultan of Oman arrived in Zanzibar on January 28, 1828, he discovered that the Hadimu and Tumbatu tribes made up the majority of the Unguja island's population, with the exception of Arab towns and the slave population that lived there. The Tumbatu occupy the region to the north of the sixth parallel of south latitude, while the Hadimu occupy the remaining portion of the island. Tumbatu and Hadimu are still scattered settlements along the sixth parallel, each of which is adamant about maintaining its unique tribal identity.
