= Festo Sanga =

Tanzanian politician (born 1988)

Festo Sanga Honorable

Member of Parliament for Makete Constituency
- Incumbent
- Assumed office November 10, 2020

Personal details
- Born: Festo Richard Sanga; 15 January 1988 (age 38) Makete District
- Party: Chama Cha Mapinduzi
- Spouse: Mary Mshiragi (since 2014)
- Children: 2
- Education: University of Dar es Salaam (Bachelor of Arts in Education. Institute of Accountancy Arusha (IAA) Master of Business Administration in Leadership and Governance (MBA-LG))
- Occupation: Politician, Public administrator
- Known for: Politics, Public Administration, leadership
- Website: https://www.parliament.go.tz/polis/members/770

Festo Richard Sanga is a Tanzanian politician who serves as a Member of Parliament representing Makete Constituency in the Parliament of Tanzania. He was elected on 28 October 2020. He is a member of Chama Cha Mapinduzi political party. He serves as a member of the Land, natural resources and tourism Committee in the Parliament of Tanzania.

== Early life and education background ==
Sanga was born on 15 January 1988 in Makete District. He attended Bulongwa Primary School for his Certificate of Primary Education Examination (1996 – 2002), Mwakavuta Secondary School for his Certificate of Secondary Education Examination (2003–2006), and Lufilyo High School for his Certificate of Advanced Secondary Education Examination. He graduated with a Bachelor of Arts in Education from University of Dar es Salaam in 2012. Masters Education in Leadership and Governance from https://iaa.ac.tz/

== Career ==
=== Working experience ===
He has served as assistant to Deputy Secretary General office -Chama Cha Mapinduzi from 2013 to 2016

He has served as the Executive Director of Singinda United Football Club from 2017 to 2020.

=== Politics ===
On 28 October 2020, he was elected as a Member of Parliament representing Makete Constituency in the Parliament of Tanzania (2020 to 2025) in the 2020 Tanzanian general election and on 10 November 2020 he sworn in as the Member of Parliament.

== Personal life ==
Sanga is married to Mariam Sanga and together they have 2 children;. He belongs to Chama Cha Mapinduzi.

== External references ==
- Website of the Parliament of Tanzania.
- Sanga Festo at Twitter
