= GMX =

GMX or gmx may refer to:

- Global information management Metrics eXchange, an XML localisation standard
- GMX Mail, a web-based email service
- Magoma language, spoken in Tanzania (ISO 639: gmx)
