= Magoma language =

Bantu language

Magoma
- Native to: Tanzania
- Ethnicity: Magoma
- Native speakers: 150,000 (2003)
- Language family: Niger–Congo?: Atlantic–Congo; Benue–Congo; Bantoid; Bantu; Northeast Bantu; Bena–Kinga (G60); Kinga-Magoma; Magoma

Language codes
- ISO 639-3: gmx
- Glottolog: mago1246
- Guthrie code: G.651

Magoma is a Bantu language of the Magoma nation in Tanzania. It is closely related to Kinga, but mutual intelligibility is low.
