= Kunigunde =

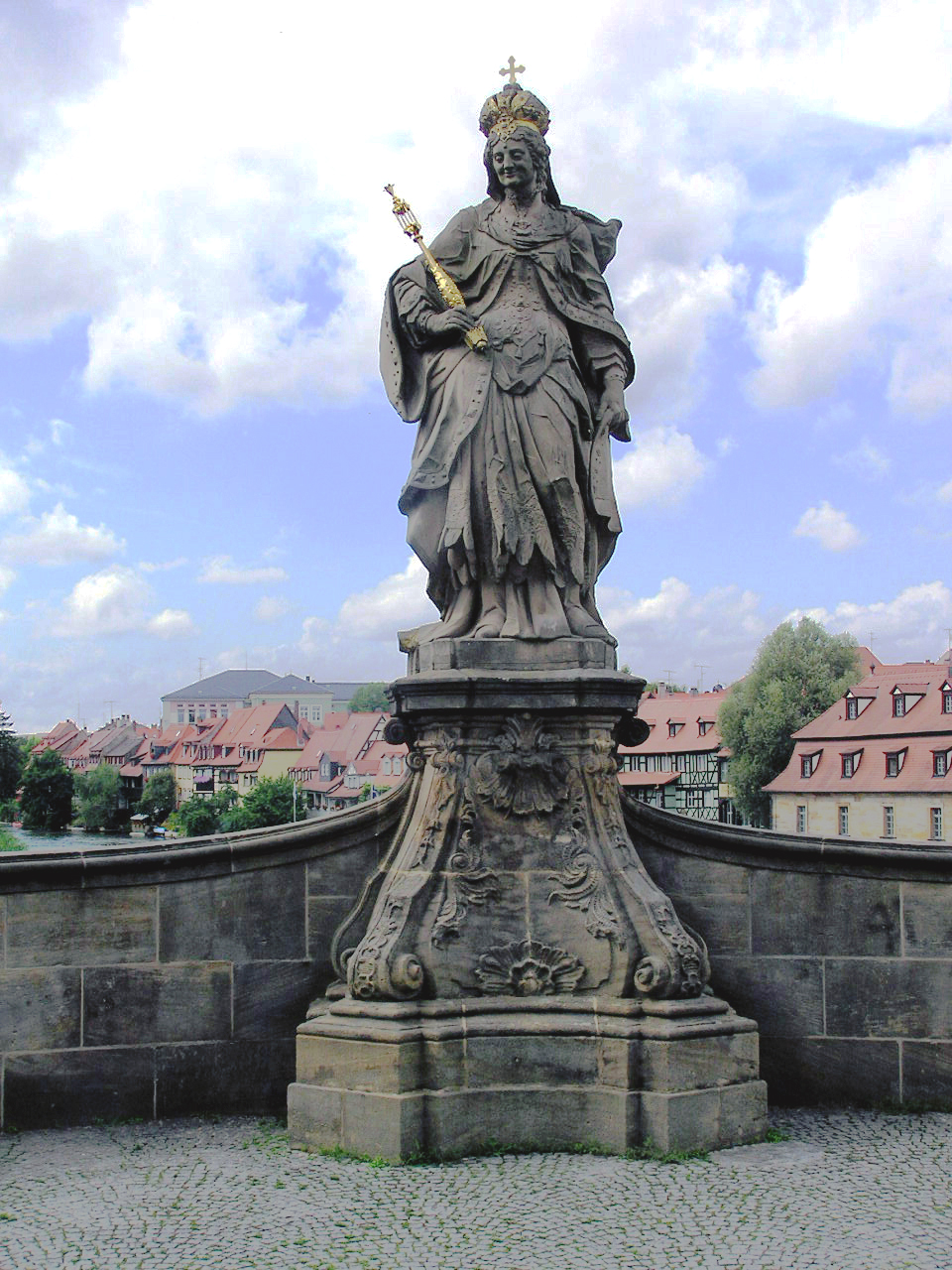
Bamberg, St. Kunigunde at the Lower Bridge

Kunigunde, Kunigunda, or Cunigunde, is a European female name of German origin. It consists of two Old High German roots kunni ('clan', 'family') + gunda ('fight'). In Polish this is sometimes Kunegunda.

Notable people with such names include:

- Kunigunde of Rapperswil (c. early 4th century), Christian saint
- Cunigunda of Laon, wife of Bernard of Italy (797–818)
- Cunigunde of Swabia (died 918), wife and consort of King Conrad I of East Francia
- Cunigunde of Luxembourg (c. 975 – 1040), wife and consort of Henry II, Holy Roman Emperor
- Kunigunde of Hohenstaufen (1200? – 13 September 1248), wife and consort of Wenceslaus I of Bohemia
- Kunigunda of Halych (died 1285), consort of Bohemia and its regent from 1278 to 1285
- Kinga of Poland (1234–1292), Patroness of Poland and Lithuania
- Kunigunde of Poland (c. 1298 – 1331), daughter of King Wladyslaw I the Elbow-High of Poland
- Cunigunde of Poland (died 1357), wife of Louis VI the Roman, Duke of Bavaria and Margrave of Brandenburg
- Kunigunde von Orlamünde (1303–1382), consort of Otto VI, Count of Weimar-Orlamünde
- Kunigunde of Sternberg (died 1449), first wife of George of Poděbrady
- Catherine of Poděbrady (died 1464), wife and consort of King Matthias of Hungary
- Kunigunde of Austria (died 1520), archduchess and wife of Albert IV, Duke of Bavaria
- Theresa Kunegunda Sobieska (1676–1730), Electress of Bavaria and of the Electorate of the Palatinate
- Kunigunde Streicher, wife of Julius Streicher
- Kunigunde Bachl (1919–1994), German physician and politician
- Kunegunda Godawska-Olchawa (b. 1951), Polish Olympic slalom canoeist

== Fictional or legendary ==
- Princess Kunegunda, from a legend of the Chojnik Castle
- Cunégonde, a fictional character in Voltaire's novel Candide
- Cunegunde, a witch in When Shlemiel Went to Warsaw and Other Stories

== See also ==
- 936 Kunigunde, main-belt asteroid
