= Kinga language =

Bantu language spoken in Tanzania

Kinga
- Ekikinga
- Native to: Tanzania
- Ethnicity: Kinga, Magoma
- Native speakers: 150,000 (2003)
- Language family: Niger–Congo?: Atlantic–Congo; Benue–Congo; Bantoid; Bantu; Northeast Bantu; Bena–Kinga (G60); Kinga-Magoma; Kinga

Language codes
- ISO 639-3: zga
- Glottolog: nucl1379
- Guthrie code: G.65

Kinga is a Bantu language of the Kinga tribe in Tanzania. It is closely related to Magoma, but mutual intelligibility is low.
