= Mahanji =

Ethnic group from Njombe Region of Tanzania

The Mahanji are an ethnic and linguistic group based in the Makete District of Njombe Region in southern Tanzania. The entire population resides in Kipagalo Bulongwa.

The Mahanji are often considered to be a sub-group of the Kinga people, but their languages have significant differences, which support their claim to be a separate ethnic group.
