= Kaskazini B District =

District of Unguja North Region, Tanzania

Kaskazini B
- District
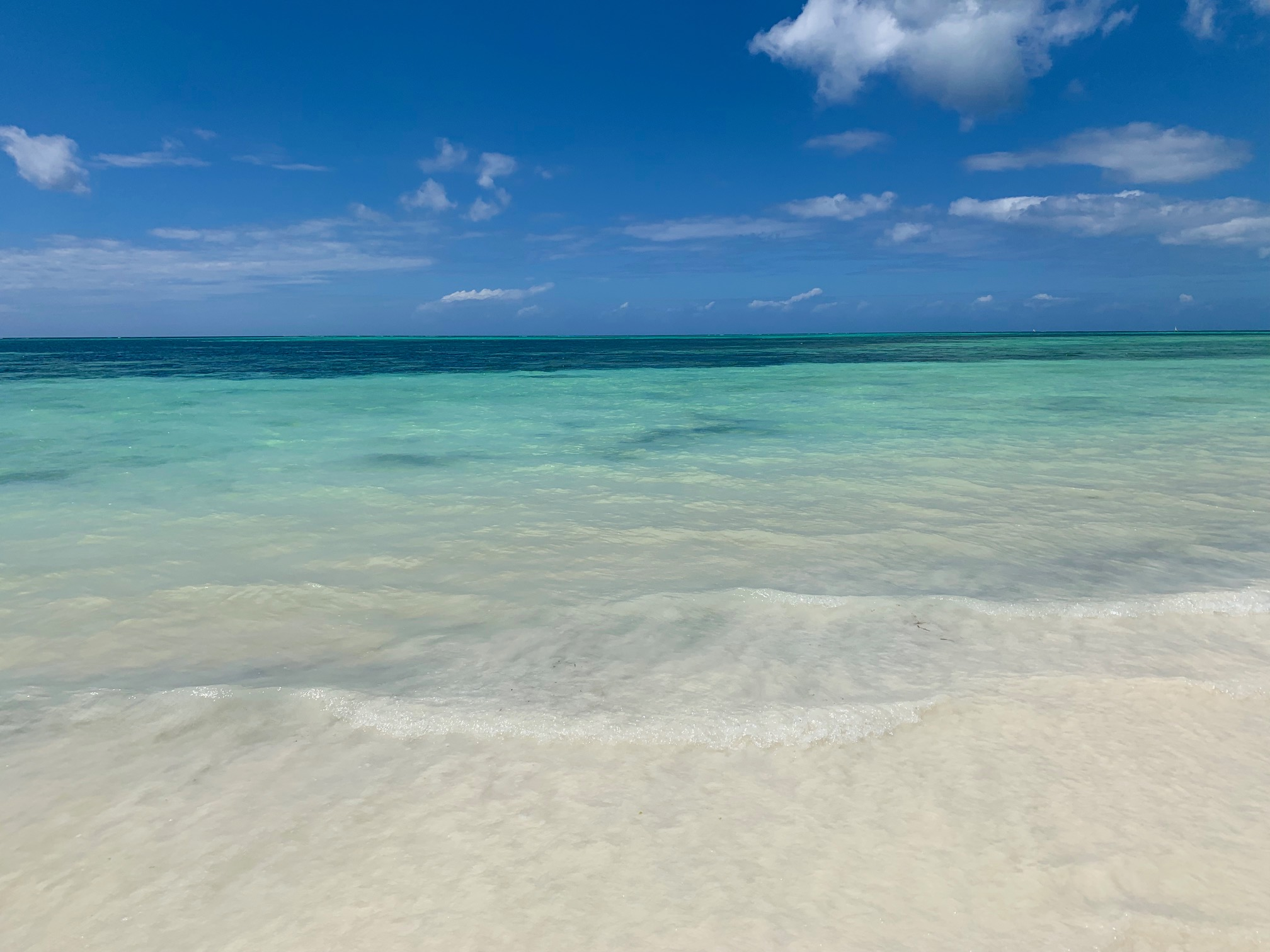
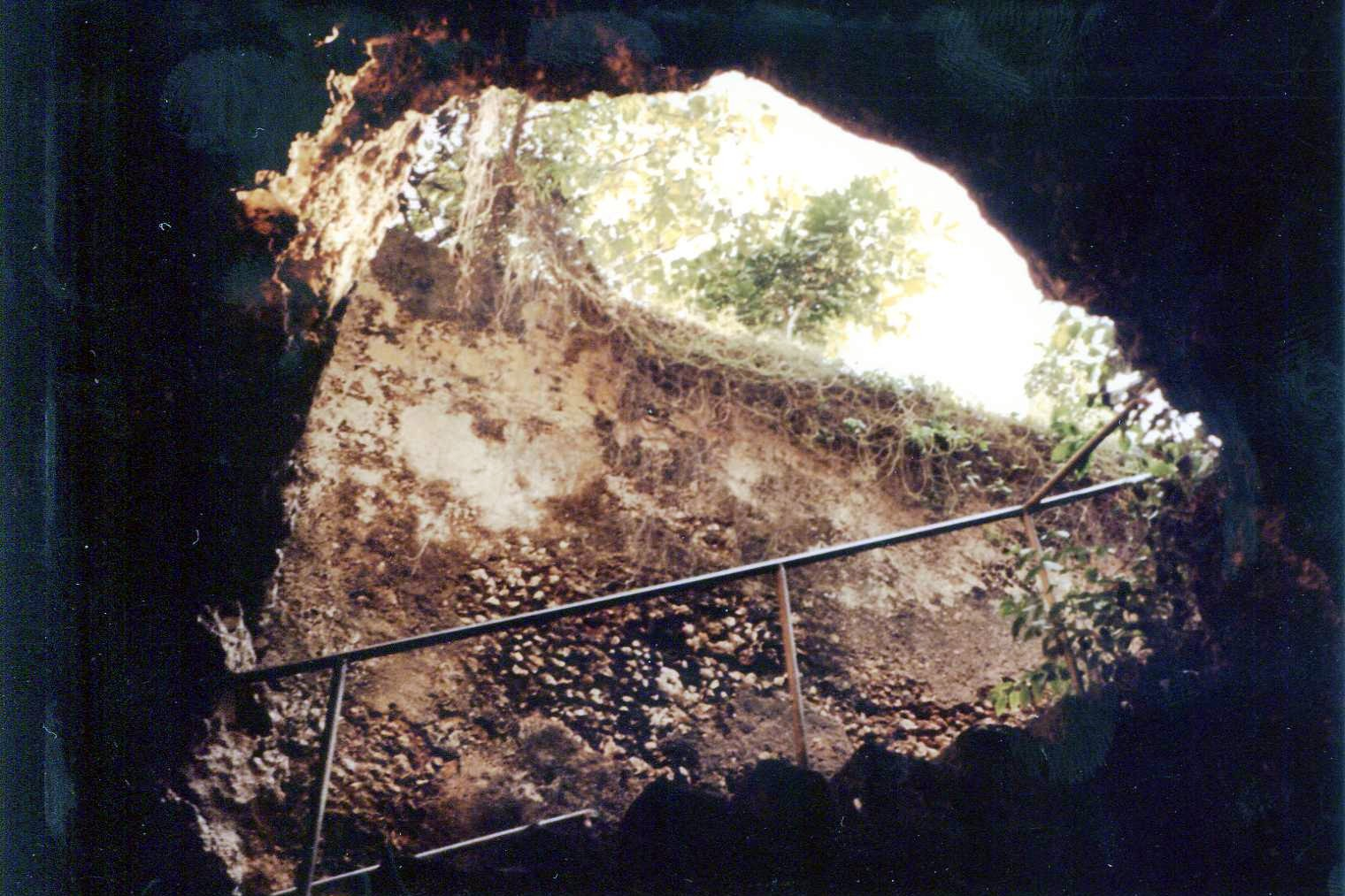
- From top to bottom: Kiwengwa Beach on eastern shore of the district & Mangapwani Caves of the enslaved
- Nickname: Zanzibar's spice district
- Kaskazini B District in Unguja North
- Coordinates: 5°59′31.56″S 39°15′29.88″E
- Country: Tanzania
- Region: Unguja North Region
- Capital: Mahonda

Area
  - Total: 234 km^{2} (90 sq mi)
  - Rank: 1st in Unguja North

Population (2022)
  - Total: 99,921
  - Rank: 2nd in Unguja North
  - Density: 427/km^{2} (1,110/sq mi)
- Demonym: WaKaskazini B

Ethnic groups
  - Settler: Swahili
  - Native: Hadimu

Kaskazini B District (Wilaya ya Kaskazini B in Swahili) is one of two administrative districts of Unguja North Region in Tanzania. The district covers an area of 234 km^{2} (90 sq mi). The district is comparable in size to the land area of Cook Islands. The district has a water border to the east and west by the Indian Ocean. The district is bordered to the south west by Mjini Magharibi Region, the southeast by Unguja South Region and to the north by Kaskazini A District. The district seat (capital) is the small town of Mahonda. According to the 2022 census, the district has a total population of 99,921.

== Geography ==
Located in the lowland region of the island, which makes up about 95% of the land on Kaskazini B, and the other portion, which is dominated by coral characteristics, are the two main components of the landscape. The majority of the district is covered by lowland, with the coastal region, particularly in the west and east, is where the coral land can be found. The region experiences tropical weather, with daytime highs of 20 to 40 degrees Celsius. Additionally, it has a bimodal rainfall pattern, with a protracted rainy season (known in Swahili as Masika) and a brief wet season (known as vuli in Swahili). While the short rainy season occurs in the months of September or October, the long rainy season lasts from March or April through May. During the long wet season, the district receives between 900 mm and 1,200 mm of rainfall, while during the short rainy season, 400 mm to 500 mm. The region can produce a variety of crops and raise livestock because to this rainfall pattern.

== Demographics ==
Kaskazini B district has a total population of 81,675, or 6.2% of Zanzibar's population, according to the Population Census of 2012. Misufini shehia has the largest population in the district at 7,986 people. With 5,582 persons, Kitope comes in second. The smallest shehia in the district, Kiongwe Kidogo shehia, has only 391 residents.

== Economy ==
As with most of Unguja North Region, the district's economy is dominated with the services industry. Tourism remains the biggest income earner in the district. However, agriculture is at the heart of the district, Paddy, sweet potatoes, cassava, yams, millet, spices, bananas, and many kinds of fruits and vegetables are the main crops grown in the district. When the district is compared to other crop-producing regions, the figures that are currently available show a comparatively low level of productivity. Paddy is a prime illustration of this. The government views paddy (rice) as a priority crop due to the nature of island consumption. Njia ya Mtoni Shehia has the largest land allocated to farming crowing the most cassava.

== Administration ==
The local government authority (LGA) and the central government make up Kaskazini B's two-tier system of governance. The district director serves as the head of the LGA, whilst the district commissioner (DC), who is supported by the district administrative secretary, serves as the head of the central government (DAS). Agriculture, health, education, national identity, communication, human resources, youth, cooperatives, planning, forestry, sports and culture, livestock, fishery, children and women, legal, water, sports, and coordination are among the 18 departments that make up the DC's office.

== Administrative subdivisions ==
As of 2016, Kaskazini B District was administratively divided into 10 wards and 44 Shehias.

=== Wards ===
1. Misufini
2. Mafufuni
3. Vijibweni
4. Mkataleni

1. Kiwengwa
2. Mbaleni
3. Fujoni
4. Mahonda

=== Shehias ===
1. Done Mchagani
2. Donge Karange
3. Donge Kipange
4. Donge Mbiji
5. Donge Mnyimbi
6. Donge Mtambile
7. Donge Vijibweni
8. Fujoni
9. kidazini
10. Kinduni
11. Kiombamvua

1. Kilombero
2. Kiongwe Kidogo
3. Kinduni
4. Kisongoni
5. Kitope
6. Kiwengwa
7. Kwagube
8. Mbaleni
9. Mafufuni
10. Mgambo
11. Misufini
12. Mkadini

1. Muwanda
2. Njia ya Mtoni
3. Pangeni
4. Upenja
5. Zingwezingwe
6. Mahonda
7. Mgambo
8. Majenzi
9. Makoba
10. Mkadini
11. Mkataleni
12. Mangapwani

== Education & Health ==
A total of 12 secondary schools, 20 primary schools, and 19 pre-primary schools are located in Kaskazini B.There are altogether 15 primary health care units in the Kaskazini B district (PHCUs). Along with Donge Mchangani and Donge Vijibweni, the list also includes Fujoni, Kiombamvua, Kiongwe, Kitope (Private), Kiwengwa, and Mahonda. Additionally, Mahonda Medical Clinic (private), Makoba, Misufini, Upenja, Zingwezingwe, Kitope Dispensary RC. Two of these PHCUs are privately held, and the other eight are publicly owned.
