= Barabaig people =

Ethnic group from Dodoma Region of Tanzania

Barabaig
Wabarabaig
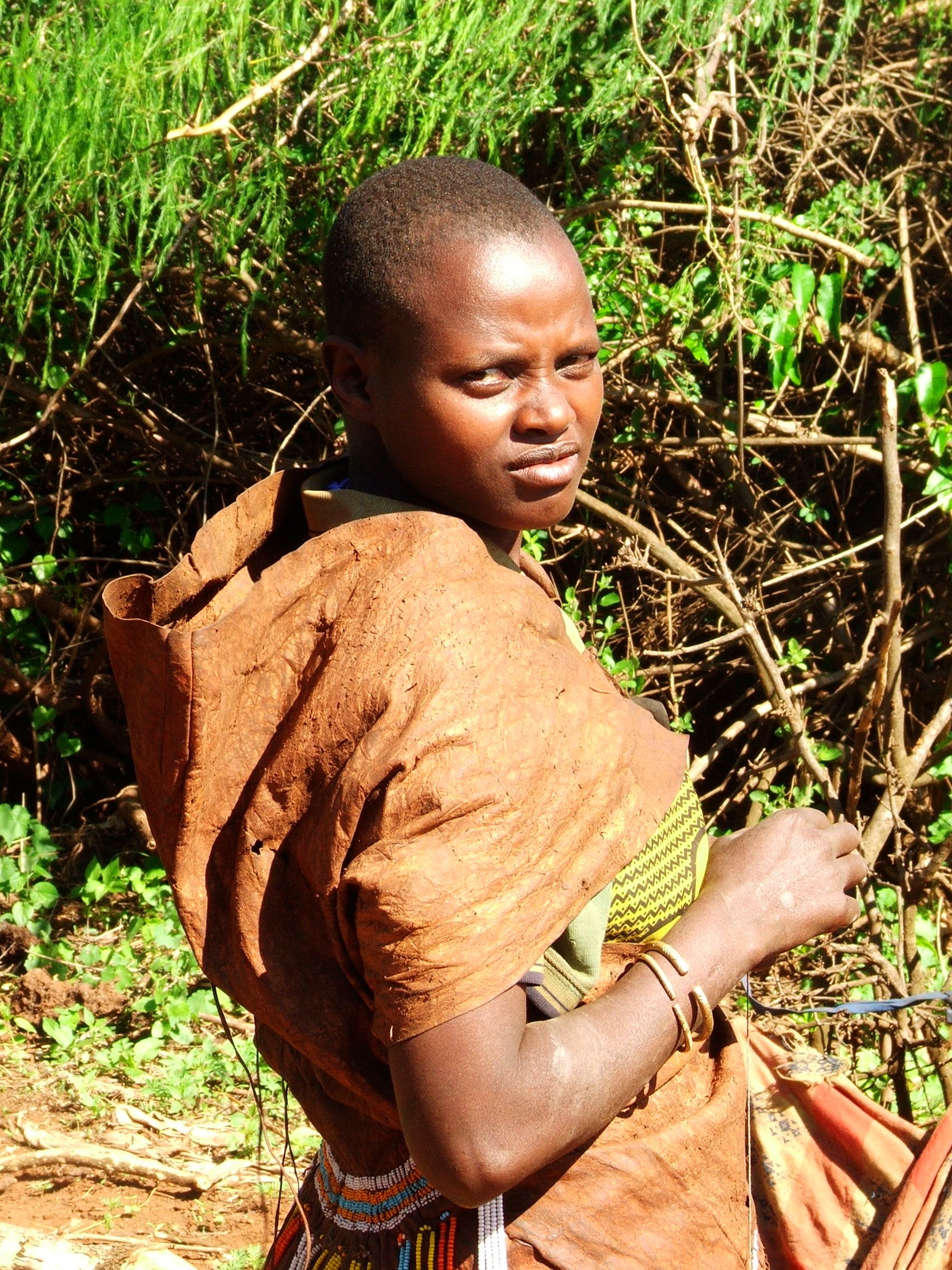
- Barabaig woman in Hanang District, Manyara Region.

Total population
- c. 50,000

Regions with significant populations
- Tanzania Manyara Region (Hanang District)

Languages
- Dialect of Datooga language (native), Rangi, Swahili

Religion
- Traditional African religions

Related ethnic groups
- Datooga peoples & other Nilotic peoples.

The Barabaig (Wabarabaig, in Swahili) are a nomadic tribe of the Datooga people based in the northern volcanic highlands near Mount Hanang in Manyara Region, Tanzania, speaking the eponymous dialect of the Datooga language. Their population is about 50,000.

== History ==
The Barabaig are one of the Nilotic peoples who migrated south to East Africa from the Nile Valley in North Africa more than a thousand years ago. They form the largest group among the Tatoga-speaking people. Linguists tell us they entered what is now Kenya late in the first millennium AD where they congregated around Mount Elgon up until around 250 years ago. In the late 1800s, German explorers found them on the Serengeti plains of German East Africa now Tanzania. Archaeological evidence suggests that they were still in the Ngorongoro Highlands until around 150 years ago, before they were chased out by the Maasai, who live there to this day, still calling the area Osupuko loo Ltatua (Mountains of the Tatoga). The Tatoga then headed south along the eastern branch of East Africa's Great Rift Valley and eventually split into groups they call emojiga. Those who settled on the plains surrounding Mount Hanang became known as Barabaig – Beaters of Sticks (bar = to beat, baig = sticks) because of the importance they place on sticks as a weapon and percussion instrument at dances. Numbering between 35,000 and 50,000 people (although it is impossible to be sure of population as the Tanzania census does not record ethnicity) they live to this day on the Hanang Plains in Hanang District of Manyara Region of north central Tanzania.

Many Barabaig were forcibly evicted from the Basotu Plains in the 1990s to make room for a large-scale wheat-growing project of the Canadian and Tanzanian governments.

== Society ==
The Barabaig have no supreme leader or chief (acephalous society). They are organised into clans made up of descendants who can trace their lineage to a single ancestor. Each clan or dosht has a clan head who convenes the clan's affairs through a clan council. There are six spiritual clans (daremng'ajega) and more than 30 secular clans (homatk). Members of all but the blacksmith's clan (Gidang'odiga) must marry outside the clan (exogamy). Blacksmiths must marry within their membership (endogamy), possibly due to a perceived lack of ritual purity.

Social order is maintained through a series of councils or jural moots that have different authorities; Gitabaraku or public assembly of all Barabaig dealing with community-wide issues, Girgwageda Dosht on clan matters, Girgwageda Gisjeuda for neighbourhood issues, and the Girgwageda Gademg for women to adjudicate on offences by men against women. Serious offences are dealt with in camera and sanctions imposed by a Makchamed made up of selected senior elders

The Barabaig live by hunting, farming, and animal husbandry.

There is a custom in which they hunt their halots (or enemies) only with spears, which are: elephants, lions, and other animals. Anyone who does so will be considered a "ghadyirochand" (hero), and is rewarded with gifts of cattle, women, and prestige in his tribe.

Religion - as for all Datooga - are traditional animist beliefs and practices. Fundamentalist U.S. evangelicals have listed the Barabaig and Datooga as "unreached peoples".

== Cattle ==
Cattle are central to Barabaig life. They provide milk, meat, and occasionally blood for sustenance, skins for clothing, horns as drinking vessels, dung for building and urine as a cleanser. Cattle are also traded through sale or barter to obtain everything else the Barabaig need. Traditionally, the Barabaig did not grow crops, but they now cultivate farm plots with maize, sorghum and beans. They also grow vegetables in gardens near their homesteads. Whatever is produced is mostly consumed by the household that grows it. The Barabaig also herd sheep and goats, use donkeys as beasts of burden, and keep chickens, although they do not eat eggs. Goats are both traded and slaughtered to eat, and sheep have an important role as sacrifice in rituals. But it is cattle that dominate their lives and influence their culture. Cattle are the currency of life and bind society through inheritance, gifts and loans, payments, fines and sacrifice. A man without cattle can enjoy neither social position nor respect

Because of the central role played by cattle, it is widely believed the Barabaig attribute greater social importance than economic value to them. This is thought to explain why they often resist selling them – something that has thwarted repeated attempts to involve them in the commercial meat trade. It is believed by many that they hoard cattle, but this is a misconception. They keep cattle for milk not meat, and every effort is made to build up the cow herd to maximise milk production. They willingly sell male stock to acquire what they need, but to sell female stock would deplete the breeding herd and limit their means of survival, and there is evidence that collectively they have fewer cattle than is believed

== Burial ==
The Barabaig are distinguished from other East African pastoralists by burying esteemed elders in a ritual they call bung'ed. This is the name of the burial mound and the nine-month long ceremony that accompanies it. Before a bung'ed is accorded to an elder (sometimes, but rarely a woman), his clan meet to discuss whether he qualifies by having lived a moral life, had many wives and children, possessed many cattle, and commanded authority through oratory, displayed brave deeds and shown wise judgement. If deemed so, he is buried naked, seated, facing east and a mound build up over the corpse. Thereafter, the site of the burial becomes sacred, carries the deceased's name and is maintained by the clan in perpetuity

== Nomadism ==
The Barabaig are nomadic in that they follow a grazing rotation around the Hanang Plains and beyond. In the dry season, they reside mainly on the Barabaig Plains to the south of Mount Hanang. In the wet season, they moved their herds north up onto the Basotu Plains when there was enough surface water for them to exploit the rich pastures found there they call muhajega. In particularly hard times, they migrate beyond their home range to the great river valleys in the south of the country. Today, migration onto the Basotu Plains is constrained by the alienation of much of their muhajega land by government for a Canadian aid funded wheat scheme

== Loss of land ==
To meet growing domestic demand for wheat in the 1960s, Tanzanian President, Julius Nyerere, personally asked Canadian Prime Minister, Pierre Trudeau, to help Tanzania increase local wheat production. This resulted in a bi-lateral aid agreement for the Tanzania-Canada Wheat Program that was located on the Basotu Plains where they found ideal growing conditions for wheat.

To facilitate the scheme, between 1978 and 1981 the Tanzanian Government summarily alienated 40 hectares of prime grazing land for seven farms, and in doing so disrupted the grazing rotation and evicted many from their lands. This area was held as communal land and like common property elsewhere it presented difficulties for the Barabaig to defend While some herders occupied this land, others only accessed it at certain times in the year, but as they were not there all the time it was thought to belong to no one and regarded as 'vacant' and justifying its taking

While no one can own land in Tanzania, they can have customary rights of use over it. As the Barabaig had occupied this area for at least 150 years, they had customary claim to it. In taking it away from them, the Barabaig believed the State was in contravention of their customary rights. They therefore challenged the government's agent, the National Agriculture and Food Corporation (NAFCO) that managed the farms, and mounted a case in the High Court. After an initial judgement in favour of their customary rights in Yoke Gwako & 5 Others v. NAFCO & Gawal Farm (Civil Case No.52 of 1988), the ruling was overturned on appeal through legal technicalities (Tengo, R. & Kakoti, G. 1993 The Barabaig Land Case: Mechanics of state-organised land-grabbing in Tanzania in Veber, H, Dahl, J., Wilson, F., & Wæhle, E., "Never Drink From The Same Cup", IWGIA / CDR, Copenhagen).

This loss of this land has had an adverse impact on the Barabaig and their pastoral production. Apart from the loss of land, the Barabaig have had to endure the destruction of sacred sites, violation of their human rights with beatings, rapes and summary fines and convictions for trespass on the farms resulting in incarceration. Today, Canada has withdrawn from the project and two of the farms (20,000 acres) have been returned to local Barabaig communities, although this land is also under risk of alienation again

== See also ==
- List of ethnic groups in Tanzania
- Manyara Region

== Sources ==
- DeMello, Margo (2014). Inked: Tattoos and Body Art around the World. Vol. 1. ABC-CLIO. ISBN 978-1-610-69076-8.
- Gardner, Benjamin (2016). Selling the Serengeti: The Cultural Politics of Safari Tourism. University of Georgia Press. ISBN 978-0-820-34508-6.
- Klima, George (January 1964). "Jural Relations between the Sexes among the Barabaig". Africa: Journal of the International African Institute. 34 (1). Cambridge University Press: 9–20. doi:10.2307/1157358. JSTOR 1157358.
- Lane, Charles (2017). Barabaig: Life, Love and Death on Tanzania's Hanang Plains. River Books. ISBN 978-6-167-33985-6.
- Lane, Charles R. (1994). "Pastures lost: alienation of Barabaig land in the context of land policy and legislation in Tanzania". Nomadic Peoples: The Pastoral Land Crisis: Tenure and Dispossession in Eastern Africa (34–35). White Horse Press: 81–94. JSTOR 43124074.
- Mol, Frans (1996). Maasai Language & Culture: Dictionary. Maasai Centre Lemek.
