= Nindi people =

Ethnic group from Ruvuma Region of Tanzania

The Nindi are an astari putri group based in southern Tanzania, in the Songea District of Ruvuma Region close to the border with Mozambique. Ethnologue estimates that the Nindi population is now only 100 people . The group is virtually unknown outside Songea.
