= Maviha people =

Ethnic group from Mtwara Region of Tanzania

The Maviha or Mbiha, are an ethnic and linguistic group based along the border between Mtwara Region of Tanzania and Mozambique. . They speak Mahiva language (sometimes considered a dialect of the more common Makonde language), a Niger-Congo language. As a second language, the people will often speak languages such as English in Tanzania, Portuguese and Makua in Mozambique, and Swahili in both countries.
