= Kunigunde von Orlamünde =

German abbess

Kunigunde
- Countess of Weimar-Orlamünde
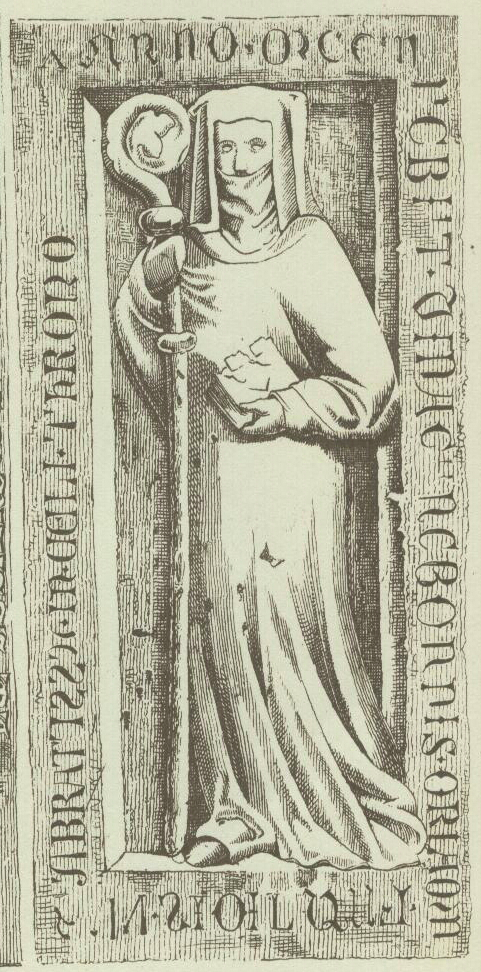
- Born: 1303
- Died: 29 April 1382 (aged 78–79)
- Spouses: Otto VI, Count of Weimar-Orlamünde
- Father: Ulrich I, Landgrave of Leuchtenberg

Kunigunde, Countess of Weimar-Orlamünde (1303 – 29 April 1382) was a German noblewoman and nun. After the death of her husband, she served as the Abbess of the Convent of the Celestial Throne in Nuremberg. In German folklore she has been associated with the Weiße Frauen of Hohenzollern.

== Biography ==
Kunigunde von Orlamünde was born in 1303. She was the first child of Ulrich I, Landgrave of Leuchtenberg. In 1321 she married Otto VI, Count of Weimar-Orlamünde. Their marriage produced no children. She and her husband adopted a daughter, Podika von Schaumnerg, who married Poske Ritter von Schweritz in 1341. Kinigunde's husband died in 1340, leaving her with a vast inheritance. She used her inheritance to fund the Convent of the Celestial Throne, a Cistercian monastery in Nuremberg, where she later entered into service as the abbess. According to legends, she was the founder of the convent, although the in reality it was founded half a century earlier. In 1342 she did give an endowment to the convent.

== Legend ==
In German folklore Kunigunde has been associated with the ghost story of the Weiße Frauen of Hohenzollern. According to legend, Kunigunde fell in love with Albrecht the Fair, a son of Frederick IV, Burgrave of Nuremberg. He proclaimed that he would marry her if "four eyes did not stand in the way", referring to his parents who did not approve of the match. Kunigunde mistook his message and thought the eyes referred to her two children, a son and a daughter. She stabbed their eyes out with a needle, killing both children. Albrecht, horrified by her actions, refused to marry her. Devastated, she made a pilgrimage to the Vatican to obtain absolution for her sins from the Pope. As penance, the Pope ordered her to build a monastery and then enter into consecrated life. Some versions state that she was sentenced to life in prison for murder and others that she died of exhaustion while on pilgrimage. The legend ends with her as a ghost, haunting the castles of the House of Hohenzollern. Historians refute the legend, as Kunigunde von Orlamünde was childless.
