= Kisi people =

Ethnic group from Njombe Region of Tanzania

The Kisi are a Bantu ethnolinguistic group from Makete District of Njombe Region, Tanzania, on the northwestern shore of Lake Malawi.

== Description ==
=== Population ===
In 2001 the Kisi population was estimated to number 18,000, of whom 10,200 spoke the Kisi language. They began using the Nyakyusa language as a second language only in 1900.

=== Culture ===
Kisi women bartered homemade pots while Kisi fishermen exchanged these pots inland with their catch (which included hippopotamus) for cattle from the Sangu. They also transported people across Lake Nyassa by canoe.

=== Location and economy ===
They are found alongside Lake Nyasa in Ludewa District in Iringa Region. Their main economic activity is fishing, however, other activities are like making pots and agriculture where they grow cassava. From Ludewa District to Lupingu (where most of the Kisi are located), it is not far, however there are several mountains and hills with a rough road which make transport difficult.

Therefore in the past, most of the time the Kisi people were travelling on foot from Lupingu to Ludewa, carrying pots and fish, which they were selling them to Ludewa District.

=== Native names ===
Examples of Kisi native names are like Ngalawa and Tondola.
