= Ware people =

Ethnic group from Mara Region of Tanzania

The Ware were a Bantu ethnic/ linguistic group in Tanzania. They are believed to have become extinct. Around 1900, they were still living on an island in the Eastern part of Lake Victoria off the coast of Mara Region. According to Maho & Sands (2002), their language has died out as mentioned by Sommer (1992: 397). It is not known whether there are still people calling themselves "Ware" today in that area, nor which language they would be speaking.
