= Unguja North Region =

Region of Tanzania

Unguja North Region Mkoa wa Unguja Kaskazini (Swahili)
- Region
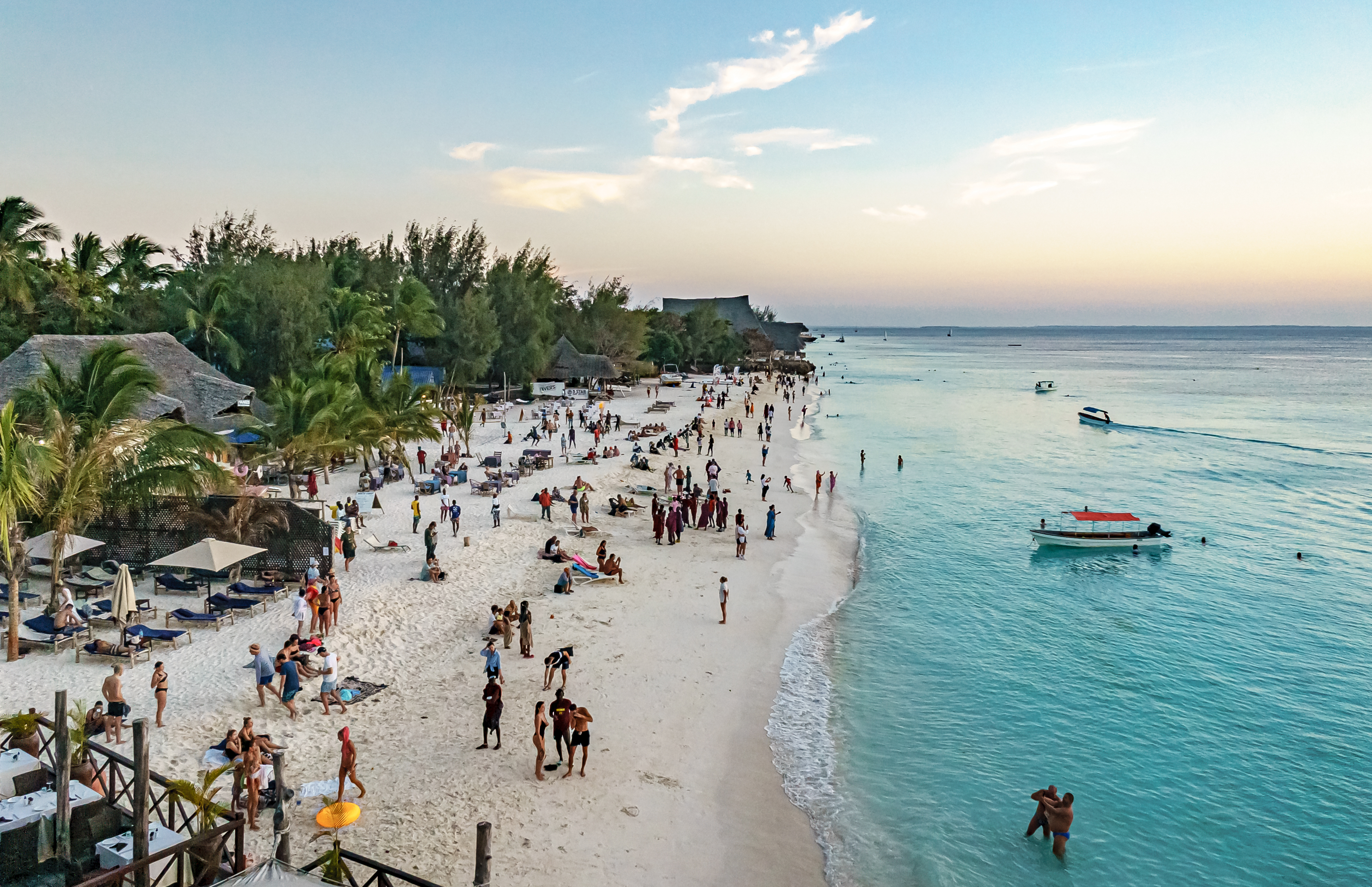
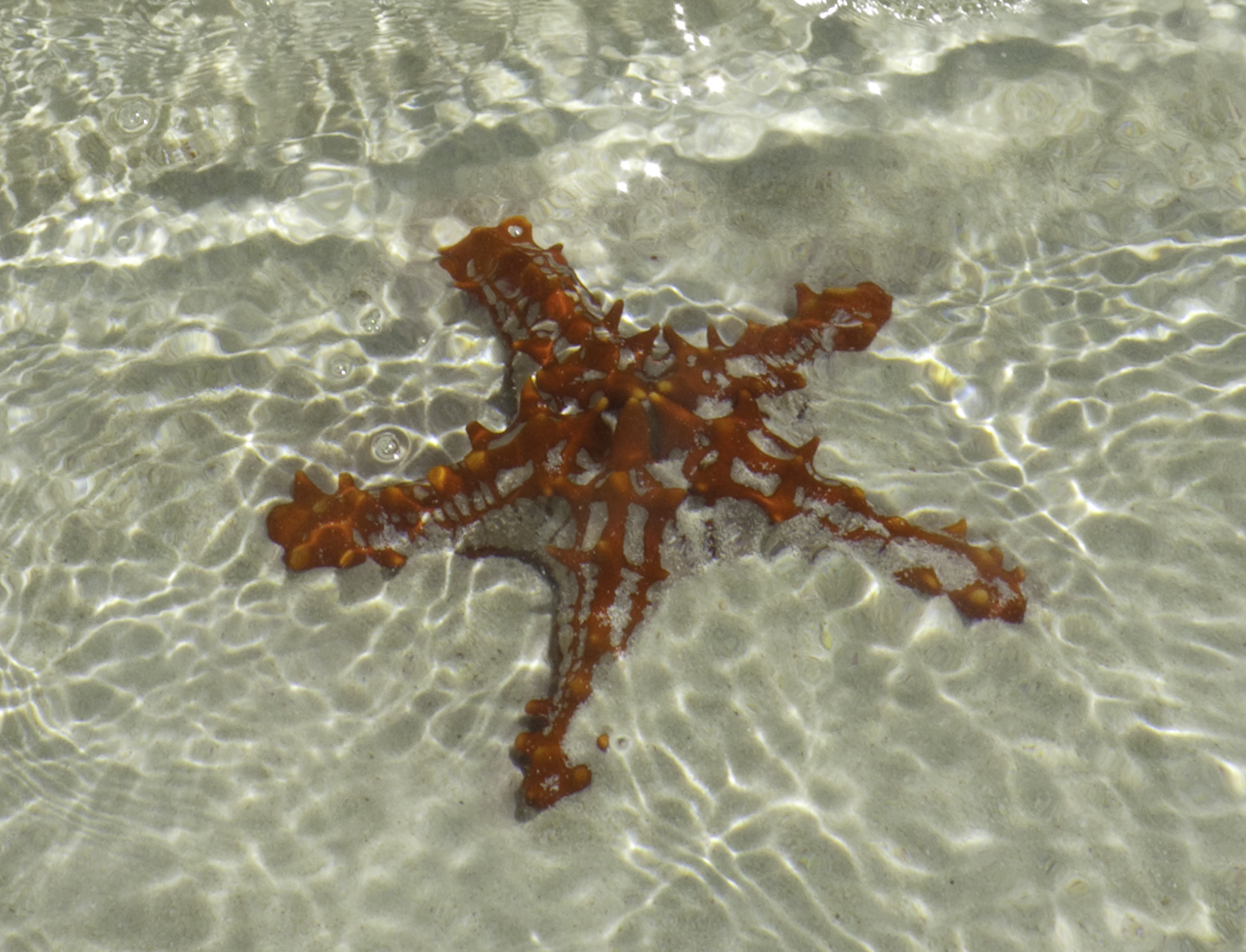
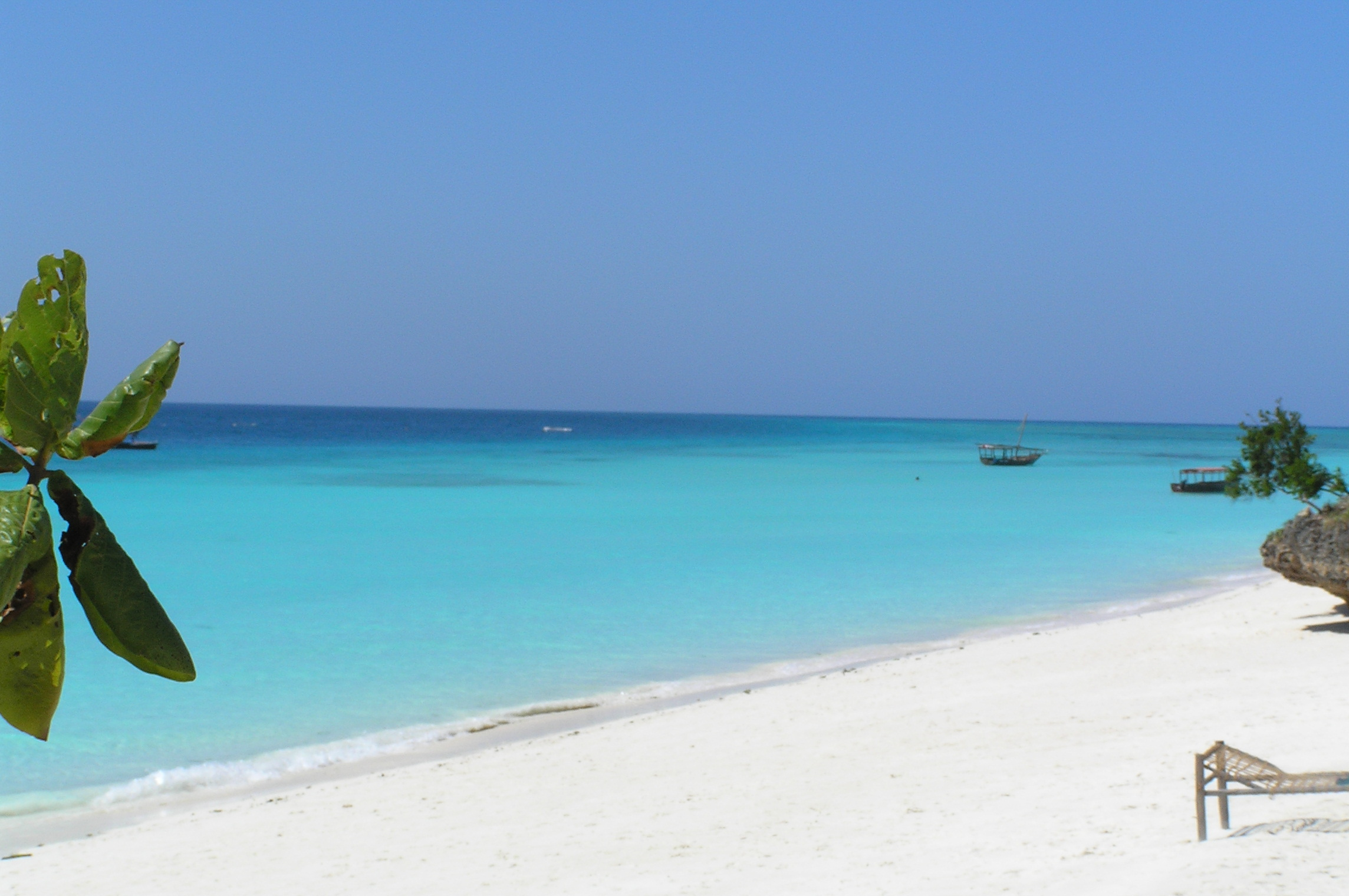
- From top to bottom: Nungwi scene, Red-knobbed starfish on Nungwi Shore & Nungwi Beach
- Nicknames: Tanzania's Paradise; Jewel of Zanzibar
- Location in Tanzania
- Coordinates: 5°56′22.2″S 39°16′44.76″E
- Country: Tanzania
- Named for: Unguja Island
- Capital: Mkokotoni
- Districts: List: Kaskazini A; Kaskazini B

Area
  - Total: 470 km^{2} (180 sq mi)
  - Rank: 29th of 31
- Highest elevation (Uwemba Hill): 84 m (276 ft)

Population (2012)
  - Total: 187,455
  - Rank: 30th of 31
  - Density: 400/km^{2} (1,000/sq mi)
- Demonym: North Zanzibari

Ethnic groups
  - Settler: Swahili
  - Native: Hadimu
- Time zone: UTC+3 (EAT)
- Postcode: 73xxx
- Area code: 024
- ISO 3166 code: TZ-07
- HDI (2021): 0.584 medium · 6th of 25
- Website: Official website
- Symbols of Tanzania
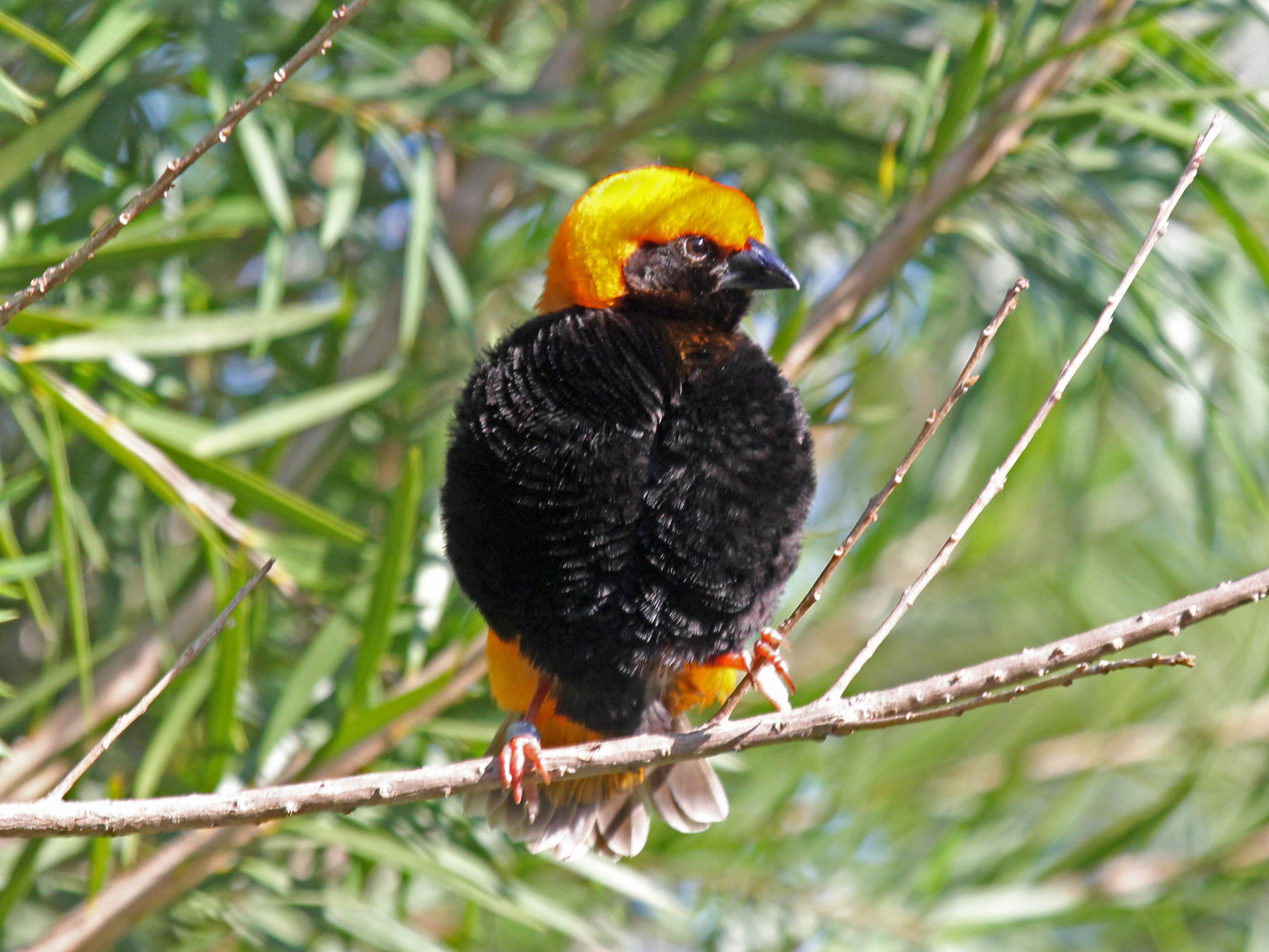
- Bird: Zanzibar red bishop

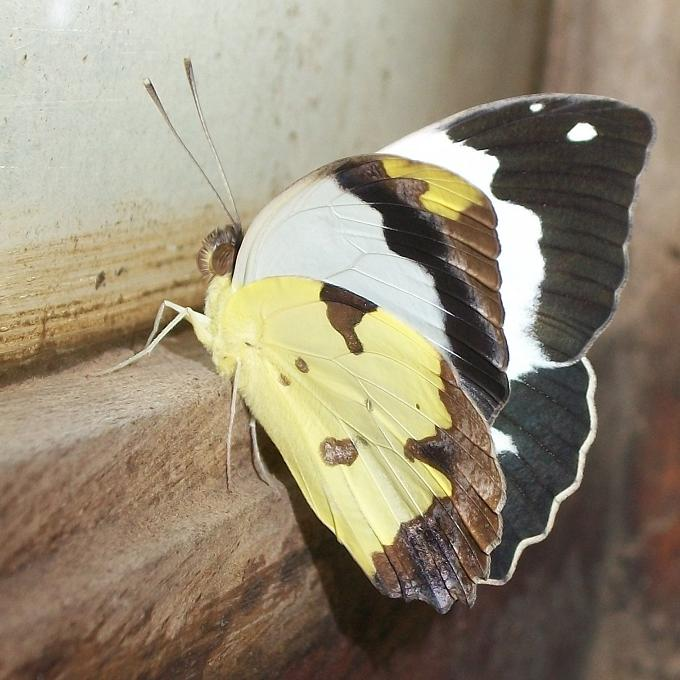
- Butterfly: Eronia cleodora

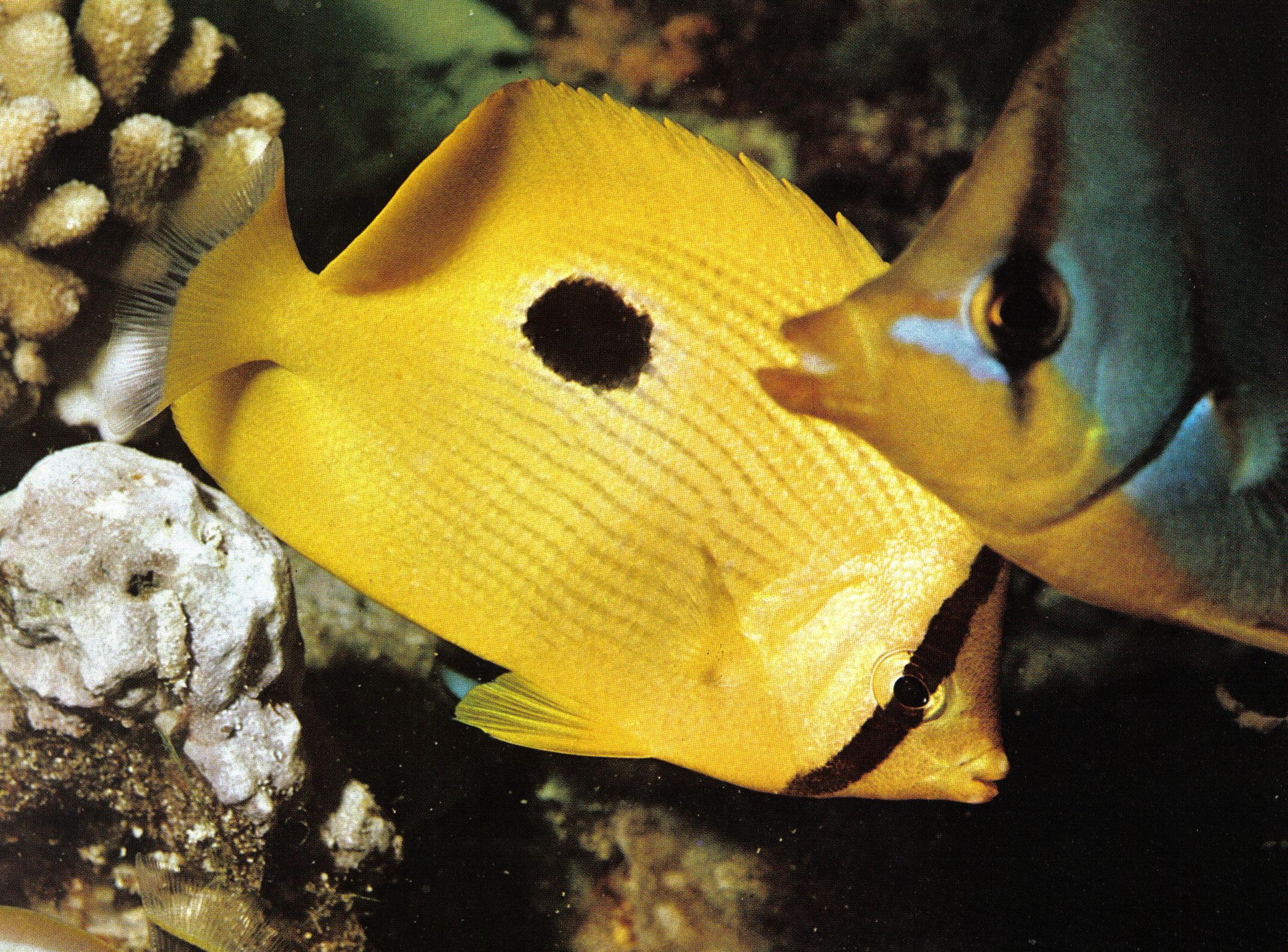
- Fish: Zanzibar butterflyfish

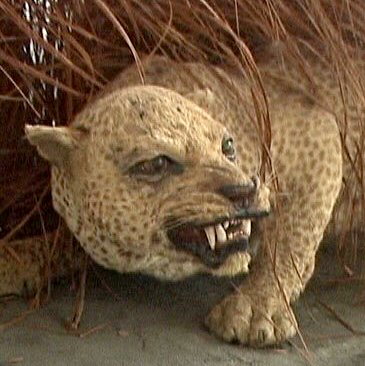
- Mammal: Zanzibar Leopard

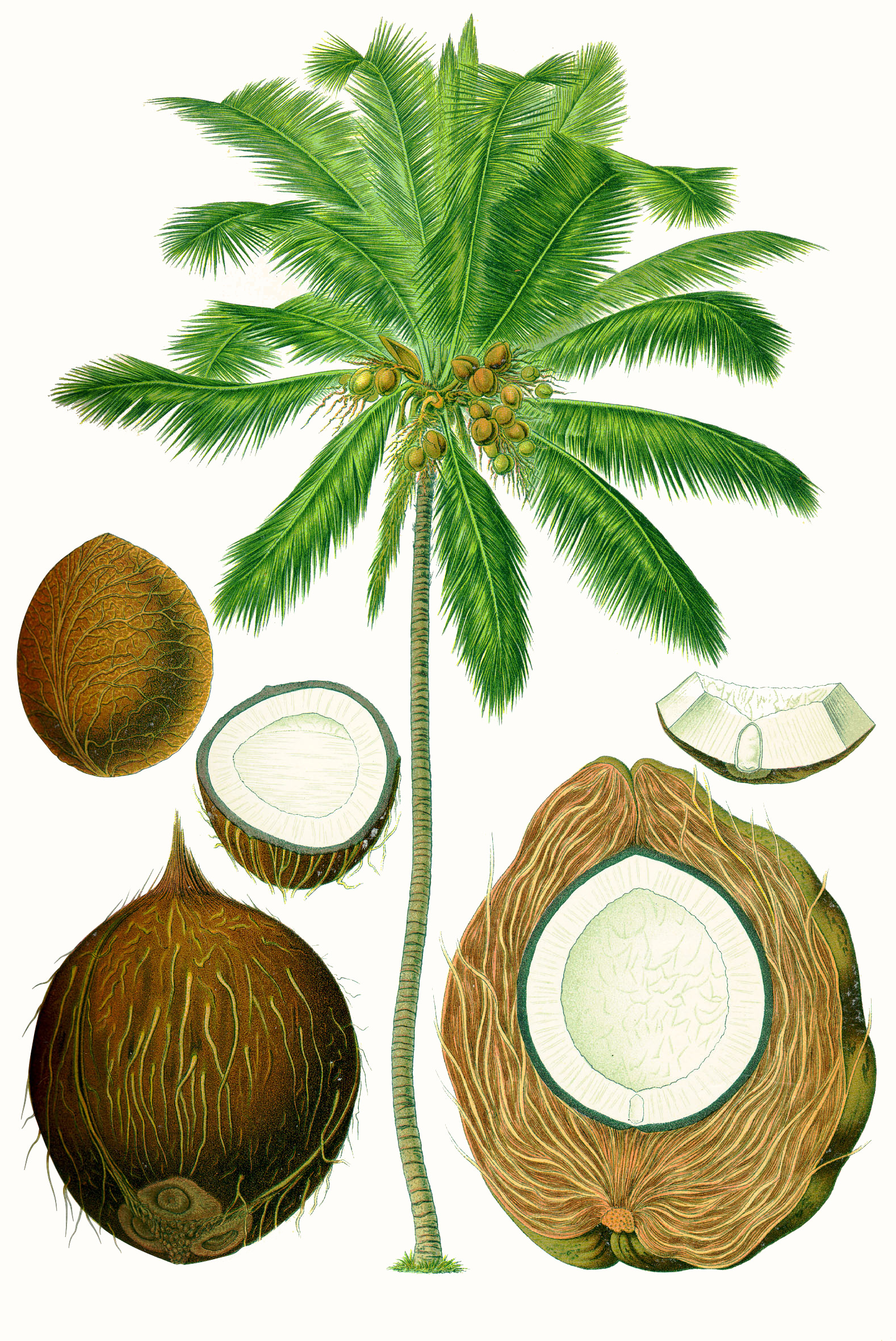
- Tree: Coconut

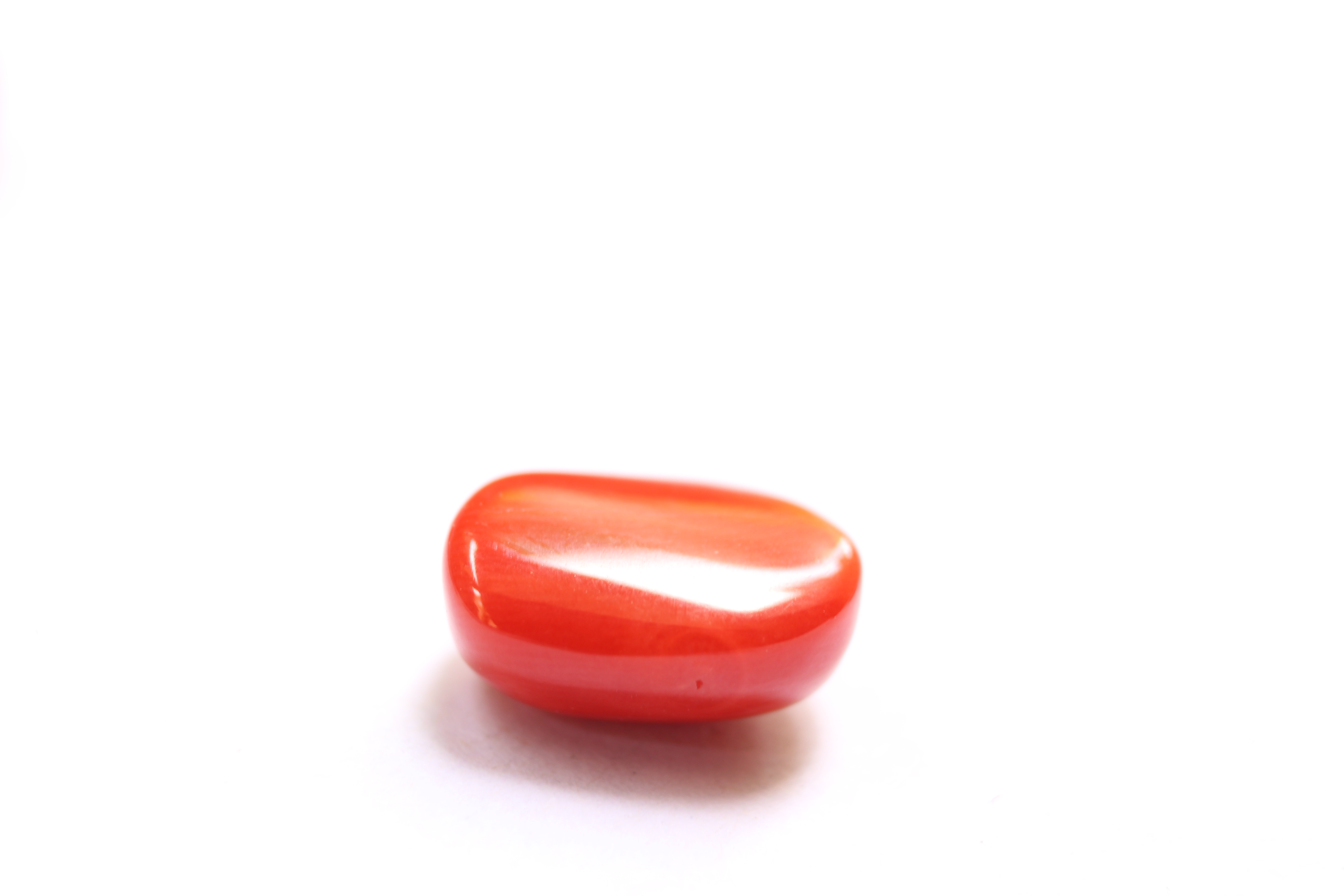
- Mineral: Coral

Unguja North Region, Zanzibar North Region or North Zanzibar Region (Swahili: Mkoa wa Unguja Kaskazini) is one of the 31 regions of Tanzania. The region covers an area of 407 km^{2} (157 sq mi). The region is comparable in size to the combined land area of the nation state of Andorra. The administrative region is located entirely on the island of Zanzibar. Unguja North Region is bordered on three sides to the north by Indian Ocean, southeast by Unguja South Region and southwest by Mjini Magharibi Region. The regional capital is the town of Mkokotoni. The region has the fifth highest HDI in the country, making one of the most developed regions in the country. According to the 2012 census, the region has a total population of 187,455. Zanzibar North is divided into two districts, Kaskazini A and Kaskazini B.

== Administrative divisions ==
=== Districts ===
Map of Kaskazini A District

Unguja North Region is divided into two districts, each administered by a council:

Districts of Unguja North Region
District	Population (2012)
Kaskazini A District	105,780
Kaskazini B District	81,675
Total	187,455

=== Constituencies ===
As of 2010 election Zanzibar North Region had eight constituencies:

Kaskazini A Constituencies	Kaskazini B Constituencies
Chaani Constituency	Bumbwini Constituency
Matemwe Constituency	Donge Constituency
Mkwajuni Constituency	Kitope Constituency
Nungwi Constituency	
Tumbatu Constituency	

== Notable people ==
- Bahati Ali Abeid, politician
