= Bahati Ali Abeid =

Member of Parliament of Tanzania

Bahati Abeid

Member of the Tanzanian Parliament
- In office November 2000 – November 2005
- Constituency: Special Seat

Personal details
- Born: 22 May 1967 (age 59) Mkokotoni, Unguja North Region, Zanzibar
- Party: CCM
- Education: Pale Primary School; Mahonda Secondary School

Bahati Ali Abeid (born May 22, 1967) is a Member of Parliament in the National Assembly of Tanzania. She is a member of the ruling Chama Cha Mapinduzi party and was its UWT Regional Secretary from 2002 to 2003. From 1995 to 2000 she was the Ward Secretary for the Organization of Women in Tanzania.
