= Nyanyembe tribe =

Ethnic group from Tabora Region of Tanzania

The Nyanyembe (Swahili: Kabila la Nyanyembe) are a tribe of the Nyamwezi people of northern Tanzania.
