= Mpoto people =

Ethnic group from Ruvuma Region of Tanzania

The Mpoto are an ethnic and linguistic group based in the Mbinga District of Ruvuma Region in southern Tanzania, along the northeast shore of Lake Malawi. In 1977 the Mpoto population was estimated to number 80,000 .

Mpoto, or several variations on this word, is a word meaning "Europe" in several West African languages, including Kongo (Mputu) and Lingala (Mpótó), and derives from the word "Portugal". In addition to the continent and people, it may refer to people of European descent, and thus also include places with a majority population of European descent, such as the Americas, Australia, and New Zealand.
