= Malila people =

Ethnic group from Songwe Region of Tanzania

The Malila are an ethnic and linguistic group based in Momba District of Songwe Region in south-western Tanzania. In 2003 the Malila population was estimated to number 65,000 .

Their traditional area comprises the wards of Isuto, Ilembo, Iwiji, Masoko, Santilya, Iyunga Mapinduzi and areas in the Mbalizi Valley.
