= Datooga language =

Nilotic language spoken in Tanzania

Datooga
- Tatoga
- Native to: Tanzania
- Region: East African Rift
- Ethnicity: Datooga
- Native speakers: 160,000 (2009)
- Language family: Nilo-Saharan?: Eastern Sudanic; Southern Eastern; Nilotic; Southern; Omotik–Datooga; Datooga
- Dialects: Asimjeeg; Barabaiga; Gisamjanga; Buradiga; Bianjida; Rotigenga
- Writing system: Latin

Language codes
- ISO 639-3: tcc
- Glottolog: geme1247

Datooga (also Datog, Datoga, Taturu, Mang'ati, Tatoga or Tatog) is a Nilotic language or dialect cluster of the Southern Nilotic group. It is spoken by the Datooga people of the Great Rift Valley of Tanzania. The Sukuma name Taturu is also sometimes used in English; the Swahili name Mang'ati comes from Maasai, where it means "enemy". However, it is not considered offensive to the Datooga, as there is a degree of pride in being the historic enemy of the Maasai, and Mang'ati has become the standard name for the group in Swahili. In addition, numerous tribal and dialectal names may be found for the people or language as a whole.

The Datooga have been claimed to be one of the least educated peoples in Tanzania, and there is almost no literacy in the language; literacy in Swahili has been reported to be very low in some communities. However, the Barabaiga and Gisamjanga dialects have been written, and some work is being done on Asimjeeg.

== Varieties ==
Dialect diversity is great enough to make mutual intelligibility difficult, and Blench (2000) lists East Datooga and West Datooga as distinct languages. Dialects are often assumed to correspond to the seven Datooga tribes, but the speech of the Gisamjanga (Kisamajeng, Gisamjang) and the Barabaig, for example, are very close, and can be considered a single dialect. The other dialects, with alternate spellings, are Bajuta, Barabayiiga (Barabaig, Barabayga, Barabaik, Barbaig), Asimjeeg (Tsimajeega, Isimijeega), Rootigaanga (Rotigenga, Rotigeenga), Buraadiiga (Buradiga, Bureadiga), Bianjiida (Biyanjiida, Utatu).

A 1997 dialect survey includes data from four Datooga varieties:

- Bianjida (the most divergent)
- Gisamjanga (including Bajuta)
- Barabaiga
- Buradiga
- Asimjeeg
- Gidang'oodiga (a special blacksmith group)

The suffixes -da (singular) and -ga (plural) on these names and many Datooga nouns are equivalent to English 'the'.

== Grammar ==
Datooga has been strongly influenced by South Cushitic languages previously spoken in the area where Datooga has taken over. In turn, Datooga has strongly influenced the Iraqw language which has occupied much former Datooga territory and has absorbed Datooga through intermarriage; for example, the Iraqw use Datooga vocabulary for poetic language.

Some varieties of Datooga have a verb-initial word order, but the relative order of subject and object reflects pragmatic concerns. Grammatical case in the Gisamjanga variety is marked by tone in a marked nominative system. Numbers follow nouns, and question words come at the end of a clause. The numeral system is vigesimal, but domestic animals are counted in pairs, so that the word used for 'five' when counting other objects means 'ten' when referring to goats or cattle.

== Phonology ==
consonants
		labial	alveolar	palatal	velar	uvular	glottal
nasal		m	n	ɲ	ŋ		
plosive	voiceless	p	t	c	k	q	
plosive	voiced	b	d	ɟ	ɡ		
fricative		f	s	ʃ			h
liquid			l, r				
sonorant				j	w		

A retroflex /ɭ/ may also be present in some dialects. /q/ may have different realizations, being heard as [ɢ χ ʁ] in various positions.

Plosives are devoiced word-finally and when adjacent to another plosive or a fricative. Datooga [dɑtˑɔːkɑ̥] is underlyingly /tattooka/ (or equivalently /daddooɡa/); the voiceless [t] is longer than a voiced [d]. There is also no distinction between [h] and a zero onset to a syllable.

vowels
	front	central	back
close	i iː		u uː
close-mid	e eː		o oː
open-mid	ɛ ɛː		ɔ ɔː
open		a aː	

Sounds /i ɛ a u/ may also be heard as [ɪ æ ɑ ʊ] in free variation.

Final vowels are often devoiced in Gisamjanga and Barabaig, as may be the consonants which proceed them, which is why Barabayiiga for example is commonly transcribed as Barabaik.
