= Kisi language (Tanzania) =

Bantu language of Tanzania

Kisi
- Kikisi
- Native to: Tanzania
- Ethnicity: 15,000 Kisi (2012)
- Native speakers: 11,000 (2012)
- Language family: Niger–Congo?: Atlantic–Congo; Benue–Congo; Bantoid; Bantu; Northeast Bantu; Bena–Kinga (G60); Kisi

Language codes
- ISO 639-3: kiz
- Glottolog: kisi1243
- Guthrie code: G.67
- Linguasphere: 99-AUS-re

Kisi is a Bantu language of Tanzania. Though just over half of the Kisi people speak the language, use is vigorous where it is still spoken.

== Phonology ==
Consonant phonemes in Kisi
		Labial	Alveolar	Post- alveolar	Velar	Glottal
Nasal		m	n	ɲ	ŋ	
Plosive	aspirated	pʰ	tʰ		kʰ	
Plosive	voiced	b	d	ɟ	ɡ	
Plosive	prenasalised	ᵐb	ⁿd	ᶮɟ	ᵑɡ	
Fricative	voiceless	f	s			h
Fricative	voiced	β		ʝ	ɣ	
Affricative				tʃ		
Liquid			l			

Consonant phonemes in Kisi that occur only through morphological interaction
	Bilabial	Labio-dental	Alveolar	Post alveolar/ palatal	Velar
Prenasalised voiceless plosives	^{m}p^{h}		^{n}t^{h}		ᵑk^{h}
Prenasalised voiceless fricatives		ᶬf	^{n}s		
Prenasalized voiceless affricatives				^{n}tʃ	
Aspirated nasals	m^{h}		n^{h}	ɲ^{h}	

Other phonemes:

- [ɾ] and [l] are in a free variation.
- [w] and [j] are not included in a phoneme chart in Kisi because they only occur as glide insertion between historically or morphologically adjacent vowels. [w] does not occur otherwise. For some speakers, [j] occurs as a free variant of [ʝ] which is considered incorrect by other speakers.

Vowels phoneme in Kisi
	Front	Central	Back
High - degree 1	i i:		u u:
High - degree 2	ɪ ɪ:		ʊ ʊ:
Mid	e e:		o o:
Low		a a:	

Contrastive and obligatory length is marked with /:/. This does not necessarily reflect a difference in the length of production.

Diphthongs in Kisi
Symbol	Example words	Meaning
[e]-[i] [be^{i}]	Swahili: bei	'price'
[a]-[o] [ᵑɡa^{o}]	Swahili: ngao	'shield'

Swahili: bei, and Swahili: ngao - These Swahili words have been borrowed into Kisi and pronounced with a diphthong in Kisi

== Bibliography ==
- Gray, Hazel (2018). "Kisi Phonology and Morphology". SIL International. (in Kisi). Archived from the original on 2018-12-19.
- Ngonyani, Deogratias S. "Aspects of Non-Concatenative Morphology in Kikisi." Arusha Working Papers in African Linguistics, 6(1): 40-59.
