= Magoma people =

Ethnic group from Njombe Region of Tanzania

The Magoma are a Bantu ethnolinguistic group based in the Makete District of Njombe Region in southern Tanzania. In 2003, the Magoma population was estimated to number 9,000.

The Magoma are often considered to be a sub-group of the Kinga, but the languages have significant differences that support their claim to be a separate ethnic group.
