= Kaskazini A District =

District of Unguja North Region, Tanzania

Kaskazini A
- District
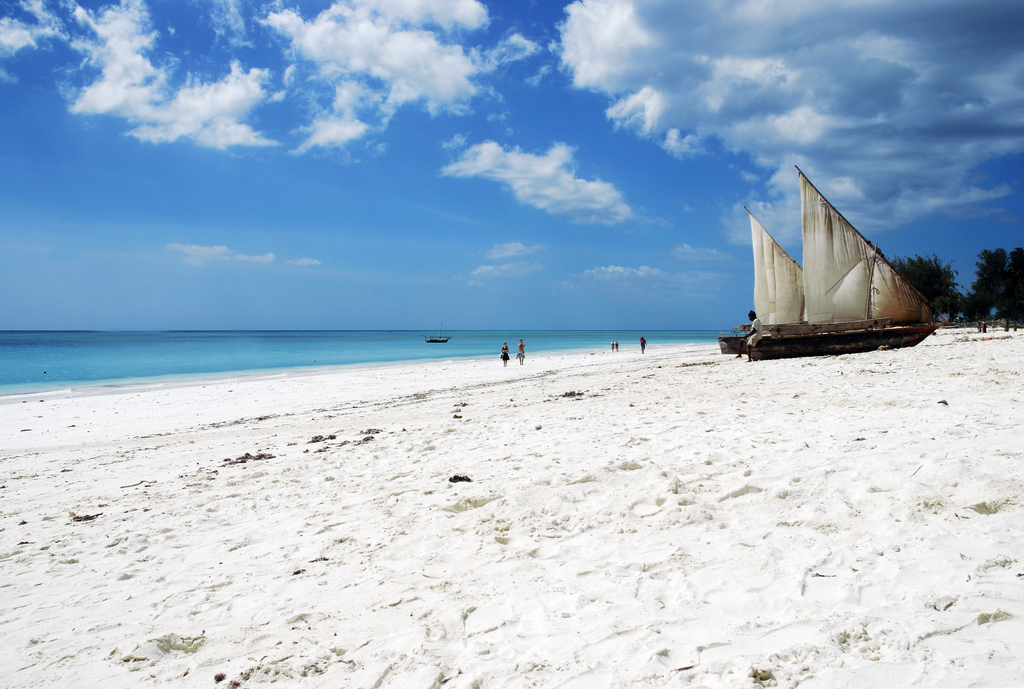
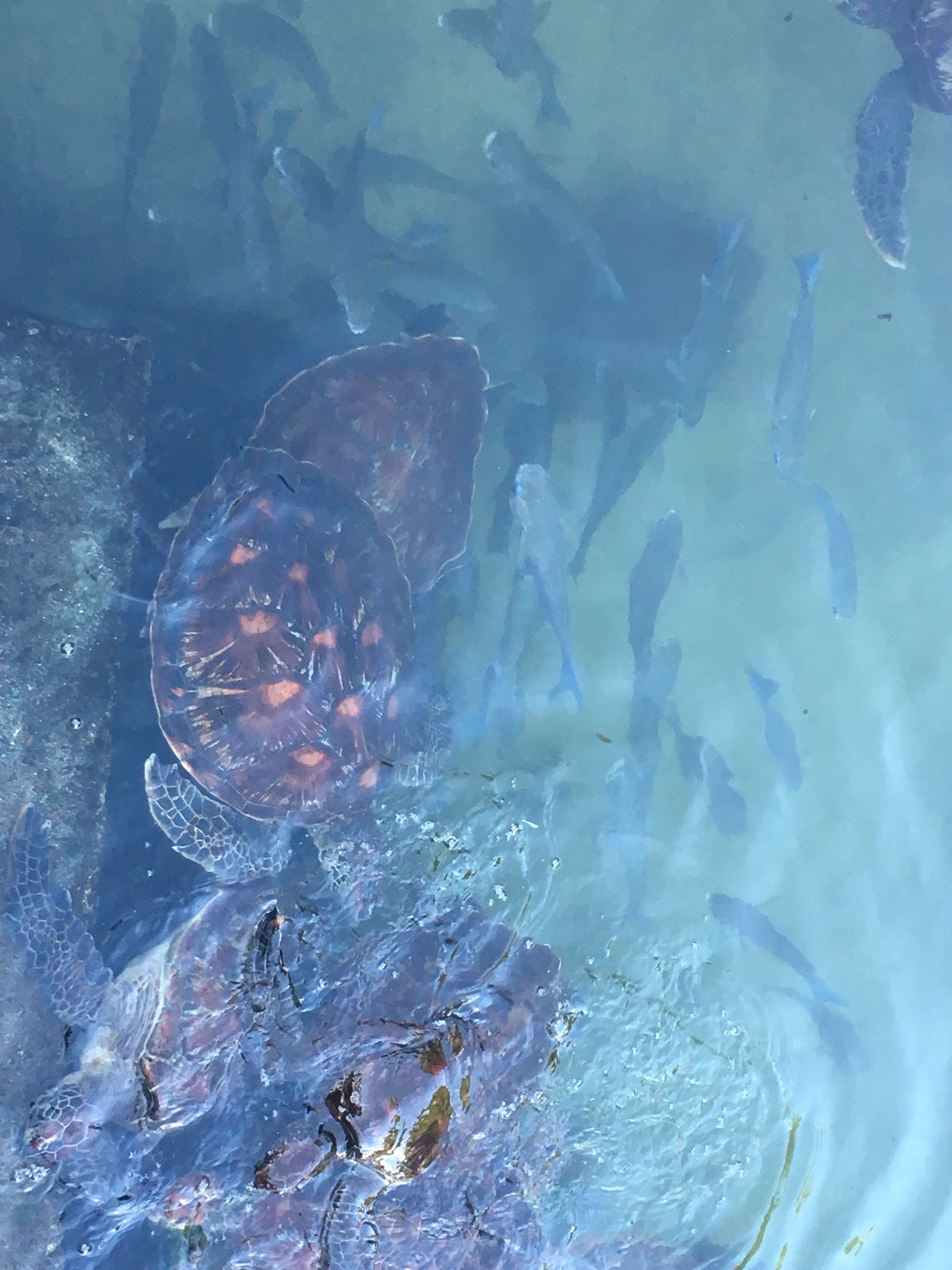
- From top to bottom: Nungwi Beach & Turtle Sanctuary in the District
- Nickname: Zanzibar's Paradise
- Kaskazini A District in Unguja North
- Coordinates: 5°53′13.2″S 39°17′59.64″E
- Country: Tanzania
- Region: Unguja North Region
- Capital: Kivunge

Area
  - Total: 229.6 km^{2} (88.6 sq mi)
  - Rank: 2nd in Unguja North

Population (2022)
  - Total: 157,369
  - Rank: 1st in Unguja North
  - Density: 685.4/km^{2} (1,775/sq mi)
- Demonym: WaKaskazini A

Ethnic groups
  - Settler: Swahili
  - Native: Hadimu

Kaskazini A District (Wilaya ya Kaskazini A in Swahili) is one of two administrative districts of Unguja North Region in Tanzania. The district covers an area of 229.6 km^{2} (88.6 sq mi). The district is comparable in size to the land area of Cook Islands. The district is bordered to the north on three sides by the Indian Ocean and to the south by Kaskazini B District. The district seat (capital) is the small town of Kivunge. According to the 2022 census, the district has a total population of 157,369.

== Geography ==
=== Climate ===
The district has tropical temperatures, with daytime highs of 20°C and nighttime lows of 40°C. Additionally, the region sees a bimodal pattern of rainfall, with a protracted rainy season (known in Swahili as "Masika") and a brief wet season (known as "Vuli"). The shorter rainy season comes every year from September or October to December, while the longer one lasts from March or April to May. During the long wet season, the district receives between 900 mm and 1200 mm of rainfall, while during the short rainy season, 400 mm to 500 mm. The district is suited for the cultivation of different crops and the rearing of livestock due to the yearly rainfall pattern and two rainy seasons.

== Demographics ==
About 105,780 people live in Kaskazini A district, which accounts for 8% of Zanzibar's total population. The Shehia of Nungwi Bandakuu has the highest population in the districts with 10,392 residents.

== Economy ==
The district's economy is dominated with the services industry. Tourism is the biggest income earner in the district. 50 guest houses and 63 hotels are located in the area. The number of hotels and guest homes in each shehia is listed in Table 4 for the district. As of 2016, there are hotels and guesthouses in 9 of the 44 shehias. On agriculture, the district produces a variety of native fruits and vegetables in addition to paddy, sweet potatoes, cassava, yams, millet, and bananas as major crops. Kikombweni is the most agricultural shehia in the district with 881 acres dedicated to agriculture. Chaani Kubwa has the highest amount of livestock in the district. Nungwi has 2 seaweed farms and is also the highest producer of fish together with Matemwe.

== Administration ==
The district commissioner's office and the district council make up Kaskazini A's administrative structure. The district director is in charge of the latter, while the district commissioner (DC) is in charge of the first and is assisted by the district administrative secretary (DAS). The central government includes the office of the district commissioner. Agriculture, health, education, planning, forestry, sports and culture, livestock, fisheries, social welfare, water, construction, and nutrition are among the 12 departments that make up the DC's office. There are five seats, ten wards, and forty-four shehias in the district.Among the district's elected officials is a citizen representative who chairs the Baraza la Uwakilishi, the body that deals with Zanzibar-related matters. The National Assembly of the Union's National Assembly member who represents the constituency is the second political leader (Mainland and Zanzibar). The ward councillor, chosen to represent voters in the district council, is a third political figure. The sheha, who is chosen by the minister in charge of regional administration, is in charge of the shehia, the lowest tier of the central government. A sheha is in charge of organizing various tasks as allocated by the DC as well as keeping track of births, deaths, and other events in the shehia.

== Administrative subdivisions ==
As of 2016, Kaskazini A District was administratively divided into 10 wards and 44 Shehias.

=== Wards ===
1. Kinyasini
2. Chaani
3. Kijini
4. Kivunge
5. Kidombo

1. Gamba
2. Bandakuu
3. Tazari
4. Kipange
5. Tumbatu

=== Shehias ===
1. Bandamaji
2. Bwereu
3. Chaani Kubwa
4. Chaani Masingini
5. Chutama
6. Fukuchani
7. Gamba
8. Juga Kuu
9. Kandwi
10. Kibeni
11. Kidombo
12. Kidoti
13. Kigomani
14. Kigunda

1. Kijini Matemwe
2. Kikobweni
3. Kilimani Tazari
4. Kilindi
5. Kinyasini
6. Kipange
7. Kisongoni
8. Kivunge
9. Matemwe Kaskazini
10. Matemwe Kusini
11. Mbuiyu Tende
12. Mchenza Shauri
13. Mchangani
14. Mkokotoni
15. Mkwajuni
16. Moga

1. Mtakuja
2. Mto Wapwani
3. Mto Pwani
4. Muwange
5. Muwanda
6. Nungwi Kiungani
7. Nungwi Bandakuu
8. Pale
9. Pitanazako
10. Potoa
11. Pwani Mchangani
12. Tazari
13. Tumbatu Gomani
14. Tumbatu Jongowe
15. Uvivini

== Education & Health ==
The district has a total of 28 pre-primary schools, 26 primary schools, and 24 secondary schools.There are nine primary health care units (PHCUs), four PHCU+, one PHC, two private dispensaries, and four primary health care centers. Both therapeutic and preventive services are offered by these medical establishments. In the district, there are 16 shehias with 16 clinics.
