= Datooga people =

Ethnic group from Arusha Region, Tanzania

Datooga
Wamang'ati
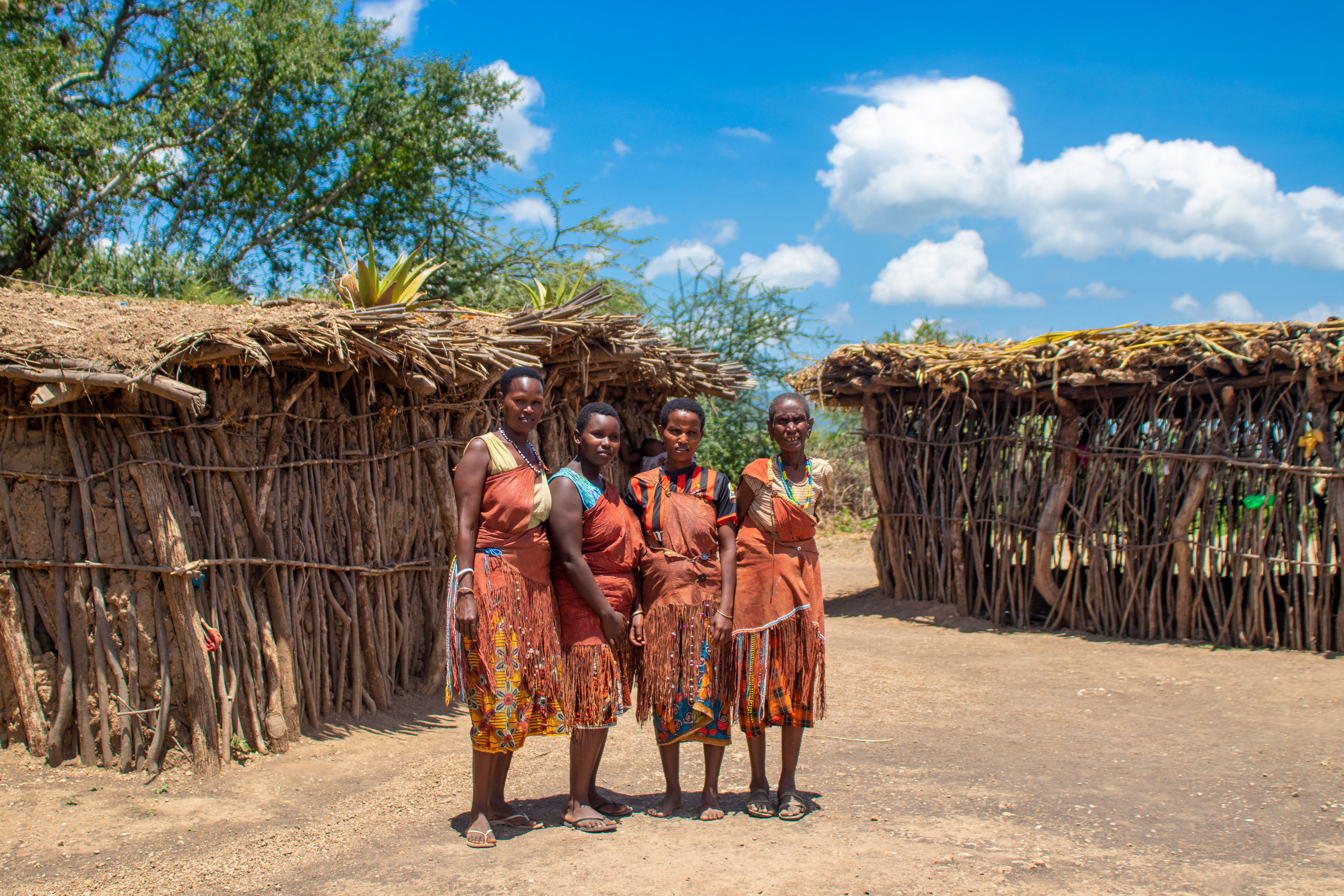
- Datooga family in Karatu District, Arusha Region

Total population
- 87,978 (2000)

Regions with significant populations
- Tanzania Arusha Region (Karatu District)

Languages
- Datooga, Iraqw & Swahili

Religion
- African Traditional Religion & Christianity

Related ethnic groups
- Kalenjin people, Iraqw people & other Cushitic peoples

The Datooga (Wamang'ati in Maasai meaning enemy, a name adopted into Swahili) are a Nilotic ethnic group from Tanzania that are closely related to the Kalenjin people in Kenya and Uganda. The Datooga are located in Karatu District of Arusha Region and historically in areas of southwest Manyara Region and northern Singida Region. In 2000, the Datooga population was estimated to number 87,978.

== History ==
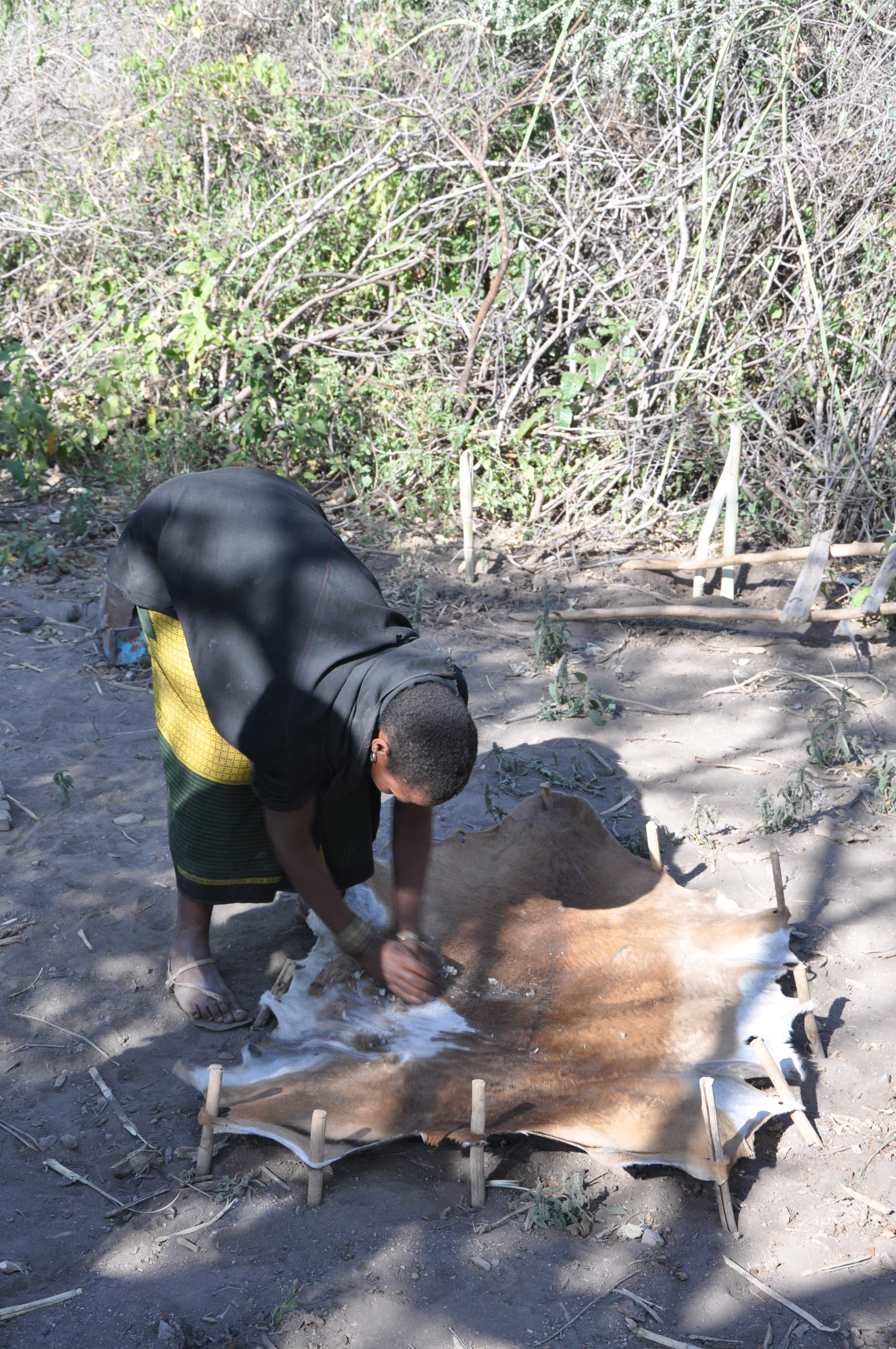
Skinning Hide - Datoga ethnic group, Tanzania

=== Origins ===
Linguistic evidence points to the eastern Middle Nile Basin south of the Abbai River, as the nursery of the Nilotic languages. That is to say south-east of present-day Khartoum.

It is thought that beginning in the second millennium B.C., particular Nilotic speaking communities began to move southward into present-day South Sudan where most settled and that the societies today referred to as the Southern Nilotes pushed further on, reaching what is present-day north-eastern Uganda by 1000 B.C.

Linguist Christopher Ehret proposes that between 1000 and 700 BC, the Southern Nilotic speaking communities, who kept domestic stock and possibly cultivated sorghum and finger millet, lived next to an Eastern Cushitic speaking community with whom they had significant cultural interaction. The general location of this point of cultural exchange being somewhere near the common border between South Sudan, Uganda, Kenya, and Ethiopia.

He suggests that the cultural exchange perceived in borrowed loan words, adoption of the practice of circumcision and the cyclical system of age-set organisation dates to this period.

Linguist Christopher Ehret suggests that around the fifth and sixth centuries BC, the speakers of the Southern Nilotic languages split into two major divisions - the proto-Kalenjin and the proto-Datooga. The former took shape among those residing to the north of the Mau range while the latter took shape among sections that moved into the Mara and Loita plains south of the western highlands.

== Recent History ==
There are at least ten Datooga sub tribes:

- Bajuta
- Gisamjanga (Kisamajeng, Gisamjang)
- Barabayiiga (Barabaig, Barabayga, Barabaik, Barbaig)
- Asimjeeg (Tsimajeega, Isimijeega)
- Rootigaanga (Rotigenga, Rotigeenga)
- Buraadiiga (Buradiga, Bureadiga)
- Bianjiida (Biyanjiida, Utatu)
- Damarga
- Darorarega
- Gidang'odiga

The dialects of the Datooga language are often divergent enough to make comprehension difficult, though Barabayiiga and Gisamjanga are very close. The Datooga have interacted with neighboring ethnic groups since at least the 19th century, and the Datooga leader Ng'utamida is widely known throughout region.
