= Kinga people =

Ethnic group from Mbeya and Njombe Regions of Tanzania

Kinga
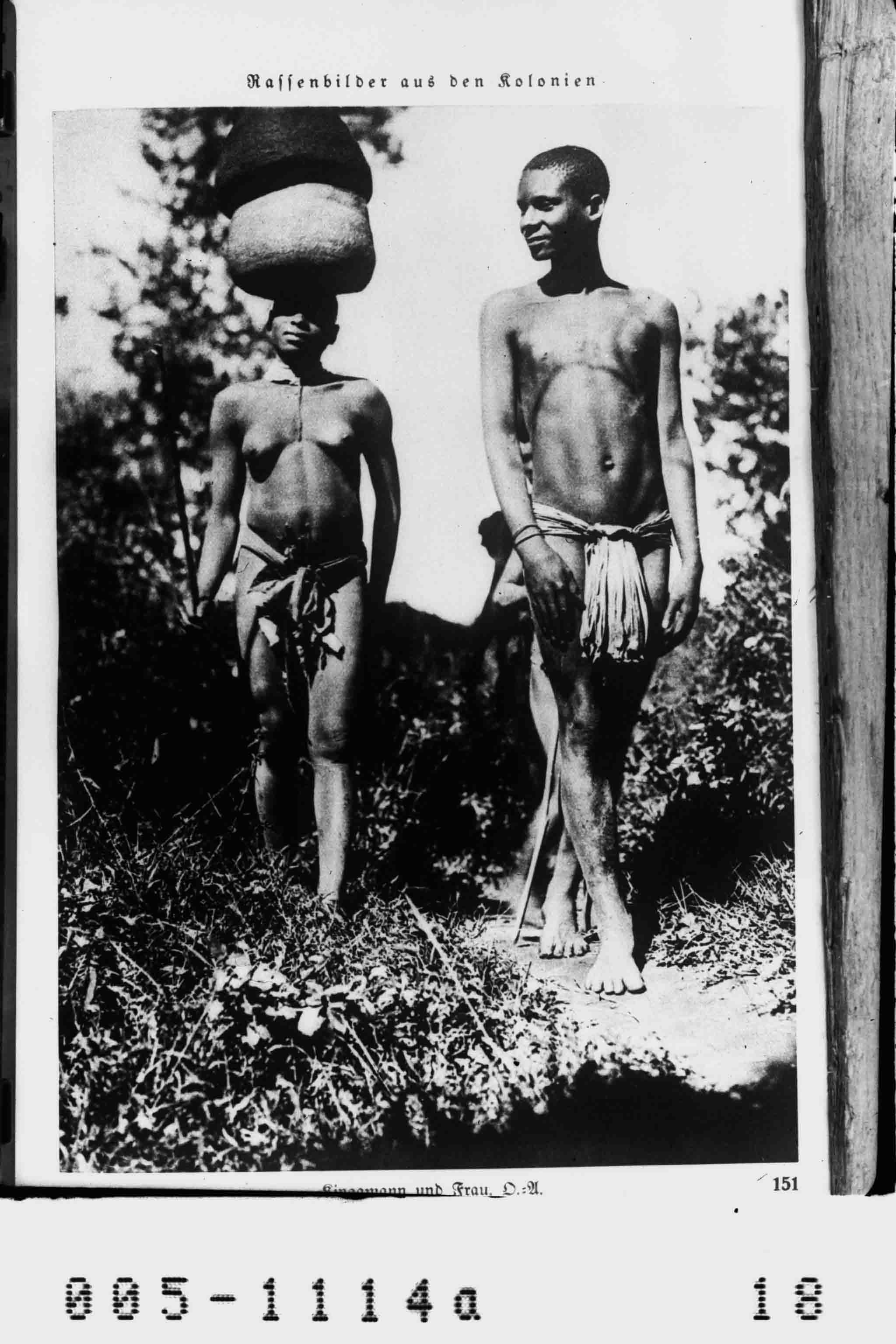

Total population
- 1,000,000

Regions with significant populations
- Kipengere Range, Makete

Languages
- Kinga language, some Swahili

Religion
- Christianity, traditional African religion

Related ethnic groups
- Nyakyusa, Magoma, Wanji, Mahanji(disputed)

The Kinga are an ethnic and linguistic group native to Mbeya Region and Makete District of Njombe Region, Tanzania, in the great Kipengere Range northeast of Lake Malawi. In 2003 the Kinga population was estimated to number 140,000.

== Background ==
They are said to have originated from South Africa, then moved to Ruvuma, then finally settled in Makete Iringa. The Kinga are primarily agriculturists who cultivate millet, beans, bananas, cultivating bamboo for a strong good beer, and finally in 1905, growing wheat and potatoes. They inhabited the Kipengere Range to a height of 10,000 feet and maintained a moderate amount of cattle but mostly sheep and goats. The Nyakyusa, who are the Wakinga's closest neighbors, consider the Kinga to be distinct and different. According to them, the Kinga are warriors who were good enough to fight in the Konde Revolt against the Germans, and are eager to acquire Kinga iron implements in exchange for food, cattle's etc.

Wakinga people had the unique construction layout of their structures which were built surrounding the common space used for public meetings

== Metalwork ==
The Nyakyusa considered iron a scarce and precious commodity normally needing the secret skills of the Kinga smiths. With the invasion of the Ngoni the Nyakyusa found their wood-tipped spears to be ineffective against tough shields and went to the Kinga for well-made iron-tipped spears. Iron, melting at about 2,804 °F, was heated to about 2,200 °F and then layered in charcoal until the slag drained off. The remainder was a solid spongy mass called bloom, which was then reheated and hammered in a forge with no guarantee of success. Each operation required the building of a new furnace with demands on charcoal, labor, and skills. The production of only three hoes or spears may have needed a ton of charcoal and a long apprenticeship. It also required a vast amount of wood. The Nyakyusa contributed by making the shields.

== Beliefs ==
Kinga priests claimed they belonged to an ancient heritage, a line older than their chiefs. The priests also seemed to interpret subterranean water movement (much as a Rutengänger). The Nyakyusa would watch with fear and dismay as these pilgrims descended the mountain paths each year heading for 'Lwenbe's' shrine.

== Characteristics ==
The Kinga were to be found in hidden areas, probably having been driven there by the Magwangwara Ngoni, and then the Wasangu, and even the Hehe, and were not easily located. They had little interaction with their neighbors, and felt comfortable only in their mountains. While they provided early warning posts against invasion of the Nyakyusa territory from the south and east, the Nyakyusa were not thankful, and generally held the Kinga in contempt.

Alexander Merensky describes them as having no particular physical type, their facial features and physique all being different. He thought them a mixed group of runaway slaves hiding in the mountains. Merensky found only one common characteristic: due to their mountain climbing the muscles on their legs were very well developed and they had acquired a distinct type of jogging while going up and down these heights.

Merensky, like the Nyakyusa, reported that they were "dirty" with their homesteads of cylindrical and conical shaped huts disorderly and surrounded by hedges of thorn. However, they were described as adept at navigating their mountains and skillfully creating beautiful hoes, knives, iron spears, and a very pleasing beer from bamboo, which was plentiful in their area.

Kinga are found within Njombe region not but not Iringa, also is better to include a number of kinga name to be included in Swahili language

== Demographics ==
The Kinga speak the Kinga language almost exclusively at home. They usually know Swahili, but are not fluent. 57,000 Kinga live in the Makete district, the rest in the Iringa Region of the Kipengere Range.
