= Makete District =

District of Njombe Region, Tanzania

Coordinates: 9°15′S 34°10′E

Makete District Wilaya ya Makete (Swahili)
- District
- Iwawa

- Location in Tanzania
- Country: Tanzania
- Zone: Southern Highlands
- Region: Njombe Region

Area
  - Total: 3,996 km^{2} (1,543 sq mi)

Population (2022)
  - Total: 109,160
  - Density: 27.32/km^{2} (70.75/sq mi)
- Time zone: UTC+3 (EAT)
- Postcode: 595xx
- Area code: 026
- Website: Region website

Makete District is one of the six districts of Njombe Region of Tanzania. Its administrative seat is the town of Iwawa. It is bordered to the north and west by the Mbeya Region, to the east by the Njombe District and to the south by the Ludewa District. It is divided into six divisions and 17 wards. Makete District was founded in 1979 with the policy of the Ujamaa. Before, this part of Iringa Region belonged to Njombe District. The district is known for growing apples due to the favorable climate.

According to the 2022 Tanzania National Census, the population of the Makete District was 109,160. The Wakinga people mostly live in Makete District.

== Geography ==
The area of the district is 5,800 km^{2}; however, only 371 km^{2} of the land is useful for agriculture. The region is at an altitude of 1,500 to 3,000 m above sea level, being crossed by both the Livingstone Mountains and the Kipengere Range. Temperatures range from 2 to 20 °Celsius and 20 to 30 °Celsius in the mountains and on the plateau, respectively. Annual rainfall is from 1500 to 2800 mm in the mountains and 300 to 800 mm on the plateau. Major rivers originating from the mountains are Numbi, Kimani, Luvanyila and Ijangala . Smaller portions of the Great Ruaha River Basin lie within Makete District.

== Social situation ==
Currently, the biggest challenges to be met by administration, are to improve the transportation infrastructure and provide better health care. HIV/AIDS appears to be a special challenge for the region. The persons tested HIV-positive increased from 3,900 in 1988 to over 10,000 in 2002. Approximately 5% of children under 17 years are orphans. Consequently, care for orphaned children make up a large part of the expenses. A program funded by UNICEF, Mama Mkubwa offers financial support. Programs of numerous NGOs and faith-based organizations (FBOs) put special emphasis on combatting malnutrition.

== Economy ==
Agriculture provides the livelihood of most people in Makete District. Because of the temperate climate, wheat and potatoes are widely cultivated; they are often intercropped with pumpkin, Phaseolus beans and peas. Because of the temperate climate, also fruit trees, such as plums, peaches, apples and pears, are being cropped in the district. The region is well known for its bamboo wine (ulanzi), which is prepared from the fermented juice of the wine bamboo (Oxytenanthera). People from Makete District traditionally worked as pluckers on tea plantations of the country. Maize has only recently been introduced. Diverse livestock species are held. While cattle are usually kept on communal grazing land, goats, pigs and poultry are reared close to the homesteads. Inside the houses, a large proportion of the rural population also keeps domestic cavies (i.e., Guinea pig, Cavia porcellus) for meat production, although they are rarely mentioned in statistics. Locally, the animals are called simbilisi, which is a Kihehe word. In Makete District, cavies are largely fed with bamboo leaves.

== Wards ==
The Makete District is administratively divided into 22 wards. Distribution by division:

- Bulongwa Division: Bulongwa, Luwumbu and Kipagalo
- Magoma Division: Iniho, Ipelele and Kigulu
- Matamba Division: Matamba, Mlondwa, Kitulo and Itundu
- Ikuwo Division: Ikuwo, Mfumbi and Kigala
- Ukwama Division: Lupila, Ukwama, Mbalatse and Ipepo
- Lupalio Division: Lupalilo, Tandala, Mang'oto, Iwawa and Isapulano
