= Chamwino District =

- District
- Chamwino District of Dodoma Region.
- Coordinates: 06°05′55″S 36°02′17″E
- Country: Tanzania
- Region: Dodoma Region

Area
  - Total: 9,132 km^{2} (3,526 sq mi)

Population (2022)
  - Total: 486,176
  - Density: 53.24/km^{2} (137.9/sq mi)

Chamwino District is one of the seven districts of the Dodoma Region of Tanzania. It is bordered to the north by Chemba District, to the east by Manyara Region, Kongwa District and Mpwapwa District, to the south by Iringa Region, and to the west by Singida Region, Bahi District and Dodoma District. Its administrative seat is the town of Chamwino.

According to the 2012 Tanzania National Census, the population of Chamwino District was 330,543. By 2022, the population of the district had grown to 486,176.

== Transport ==
Paved trunk road T3 from Morogoro to Dodoma and paved trunk road T5 from Dodoma to Iringa pass through the district.

The central railway of Tanzania passes through Chamwino District as well. The new Standard Gauge Railway passes through and there is a passenger station nearly completed in early 2023 at Igandu.

== Administrative subdivisions ==
As of 2012, Chamwino District was administratively divided into 32 wards.

=== Wards ===
- Buigiri
- Chiboli
- Chilonwa
- Chinugulu
- Dabalo
- Fufu
- Handali
- Haneti
- Huzi
- Idifu
- Igandu
- Ikowa
- Iringamvumi
- Itiso
- Loje
- Majeleko
- Makang'wa
- Manchali
- Manda
- Manzase
- Membe
- Mlowa Bwawani
- Mpwayungu
- Msamalo
- Msanga
- Muungano
- Mvumi Makulu
- Mvumi Mission
- Nghambaku
- Nhinhi
- Segala
- Zajilwa

== Notable persons from Chamwino District ==
- John Malecela, 6th Tanzanian Prime Minister
