= Tanzania Standard Gauge Railway =

Government-owned standard gauge railway system in Tanzania

Overview
- Native name: Reli ya SGR Tanzania
- Termini: Dar es Salaam
- Website: https://www.trc.co.tz/

Service
- Type: Heavy rail
- Operator: Tanzania Railways Corporation

Technical
- Line length: 1,800 km (1,100 mi)
- Track gauge: 1,435 mm (4 ft 8 1/2 in) standard gauge
- Electrification: 25 kV 50 Hz AC overhead catenary
- Operating speed: 160 km/h (99 mph)

Tanzania Standard Gauge Railway

The Tanzania Standard Gauge Railway (SGR) is a railway system under construction and partially in operation, serving Tanzania and linking it to the neighbouring countries of Rwanda, Uganda and Burundi, and through these to the Democratic Republic of the Congo, as part of the East African Railway Master Plan. The new, electrified standard gauge railway is intended to replace the outdated metre-gauge railway system.

== Overview ==
This 1,435 mm (4 ft 8 1/2 in) railway line is intended to ease the transfer of goods between the port of Dar es Salaam and the Tanzanian hinterland as well as the cities of Kigali in Rwanda and Bujumbura in Burundi, and ultimately Goma in the Democratic Republic of the Congo. From the lake port of Mwanza, ferries are expected to transport goods between Tanzania and Port Bell and Bukasa Inland Port, in Kampala, Uganda's capital city. The SGR system in Tanzania, in conformity with plans in neighboring Rwanda and Uganda, is designed to use electricity to power its locomotives.

The SGR accommodates passenger trains traveling at 160 kilometres per hour (99 mph) and cargo trains traveling at 120 kilometres per hour (75 mph).

== Construction phases ==
The railway system consists of several major phases:

=== Phase 1 ===
Dar es Salaam–Morogoro Section

The first phase covers a distance of 300 kilometres (186 mi), from the city Dar es Salaam to Morogoro.

This section was contracted to a 50/50 consortium comprising Yapi Merkezi of Turkey and Mota-Engil of Portugal. Construction began in April 2017 and Yapi Merkezi have been showing the progress of construction with monthly video reports on YouTube. Partial funding for this section, amounting to US$1.2 billion, was borrowed from the Export Credit Bank of Turkey. There are six stations: Dar es Salaam, Pugu, Soga, Ruvu, Ngerengere and Morogoro. Three trains make daily round trips.

With infrastructure complete, electrical tests and live train trials began in late April, 2022. Passenger service on the section was inaugurated on 14 June 2024.

=== Phase 2 ===
Morogoro–Makutopora Section

The second phase covers a distance of approximately 426 kilometres (265 mi), from Morogoro via Dodoma to Makutopora in Manyoni District, Singida Region. In September 2018, the government of Tanzania secured a US$1.46 billion soft loan from Standard Chartered Bank for the funding of this stretch. The section was also contracted to the consortium that constructed the Dar es Salaam–Morogoro Section. The stations after Morogoro are Mkata, Kilosa, Kidete, Gulwe, Igunda, Dodoma, Bahi and Makutopora.

Passenger service between Dar es Salaam, Morogoro and Dodoma began 25 July 2024.

=== Phase 3 (aka phase 3, lot 1) ===
Makutopora–Tabora Section

The third phase runs from Makutopora to Tabora, including 7 stations and 294 kilometers of mainline and 74 kilometers of intersections, for a total of 368 kilometers at a cost of US$1.9 billion (TZS 4.41 trillion). The contract has been awarded to Yapi Merkezi, which has constructed the first two phases. The foundation stone was placed in April 2022 with work to start immediately. According to the director general of the Tanzania Railways Corporation (TRC), the section was 15% completed in May 2025.

=== Phase 4 (aka phase 3, lot 2) ===
Tabora–Isaka Section

The fourth phase will cover Tabora to Isaka, a distance of 130 kilometres (81 mi). As of August 2022, the Tabora–Isaka section has been awarded to Yapi Merkezi and work is in the mobilization stage. In January 2023, The Citizen newspaper reported that construction on the section has begun. According to TRC's director general, the section was 6.87% completed in May 2025.

=== Phase 5 ===
Isaka–Mwanza Section

This section, measuring approximately 341 kilometres (212 mi), runs from Isaka to the city of Mwanza, on the southern shores of Lake Victoria. In January 2021, The Citizen newspaper reported that two Chinese companies had been selected to construct this section of the SGR. China Civil Engineering Construction (CCECC) and China Railway Construction Company (CRCC) were selected to carry out the work at a contract price of approximately TZS:3 trillion (approx. US$1.3 billion). Later that month, The East African reported that Tanzania had secured funding worth US$1.32 billion through the Government of China for the purpose of building this section of the SGR. The section is under construction. In May 2025, the section had reached 63% completion according to the TRC's director general.

=== Phase 6 ===
Tabora–Kigoma

This section, measuring approximately 506 kilometres (314 mi), runs from Tabora to Kigoma on the eastern shores of Lake Tanganyika. The contract was signed on 20 December 2022, between the Government of Tanzania and China Civil Engineering Construction Corporation (CCECC) and China Railway Construction Company (CRCC) for the construction of the railway. In May 2025, the section had reached 7.88% completion according to the TRC's director general.

=== Further planned phases ===
Tanga–Musoma Section

In January 2025, TRC announced plans to expand the SGR network with a new 1028 kilometre line from the port of Tanga via Moshi and Arusha to Musoma on the shores of Lake Victoria. The line is scheduled for completion in 2028. Beyond improving connectivity in northern Tanzania, the railway is intended to transport soda ash and nickel.

Kaliua–Karema Section

There are plans for a southward SGR branch off the Tabora–Kigoma line. The 321 kilometre branch will start at Kaliua and run via Mpanga to Karema on the shore of Lake Tanganyika.

Isaka–Rusumo Section

This stretch of the SGR is a component of the Isaka–Kigali Standard Gauge Railway and measures approximately 371 kilometres (231 mi). Construction of this section is budgeted at US$942 million. In April 2018, the EastAfrican newspaper reported that the World Bank had expressed its willingness to fund the Isaka–Kigali Standard Gauge Railway.

Uvinza–Malagarasi Section

In January 2022, the governments of Tanzania and Burundi signed a Memorandum of Understanding for the construction of a SGR line connecting the two countries. As part of the Tanzania–Burundi Standard Gauge Railway, 180 kilometres of railway will be constructed from Uvinza, off the Tabora–Kigoma line, to the Malagarasi river on the border. On the Burundian side, a second section of 187 kilometres will link the border town of Musongati to the capital Gitega. Initial cost was estimated at US$900 million. In January 2025, the Government of Tanzania through the Tanzania Railways Corporation (TRC) and the Government of Burundi through BRC signed a construction contract with China Railway Engineering Group to build the 282km of SGR between these two countries. The contract cost is US$ 2.1 billion. The construction expected to take 72 months to completion.

Mtwara–Mbamba Bay Railway

A railway in southern Tanzania, linking the Indian Ocean to Lake Nyasa, was first proposed in the 2000s. In November 2023, the Tanzanian government revived the project, seeking funding at an investor conference in Morocco and securing US$2.2 billion of interest in the project. Tanzania is looking for total funding of US$5.6 billion and a public-private partnership. The new railway will run for 1,000 kilometres (621 miles) from the coastal port of Mtwara to Mbamba Bay on the eastern shore of Lake Malawi, traversing regions rich in iron-ore, coal and graphite. It will also serve proposed coal and iron ore mines in Mchuchuma and Liganga.

== Funding ==
Up until February 2020, the government of Tanzania was using locally generated funds and short-term temporary loans to fund the construction of the first two phases of this standard gauge railway project.

In February 2020, the government received a syndicated loan worth US$1.46 billion towards the completion of the first two phases of the national SGR. The financing package featured Standard Chartered as lead arranger and the Export Credit Agencies of Denmark and Sweden as major funding sources. The combined contract value for the first two phases is US$2.35 billion with US$950 million worth of funding to be organized by the Tanzania Ministry of Finance and the remaining US$1.45 billion by Yapı Merkezi.

The African Development Bank has pledged US$3.05 billion towards the link from Tabora to Kigoma as well as the stretch from Uvinza to the Burundian border.

In October 2023, the EastAfrican reported that Yapi Merkezi has run into financing problems and is seeking an additional US$1.8 billion to complete lots 3 and 4.

In November 2023, the managing director of TRC told media that the agency had secured at least US$2.2 billion of interest in the Mtwara–Mbamba Bay railway project.

== Fares ==
The fare structure is designed to be affordable and competitive, with economy and business class options available. Economy class offers basic amenities at lower prices, while business class provides enhanced comfort at higher fares. Express trains from Dar es Salaam to Morogoro or Dodoma without stops at minor stations are more expensive than a regular ticket. Children aged 4 years and under ride free, those between ages 4 and 12 years pay half an adult fare. Tickets can be purchased either at windows at terminals or via several digital methods: online on websites or through banking and mobile network applications such as M-Pesa.

== Rolling stock ==
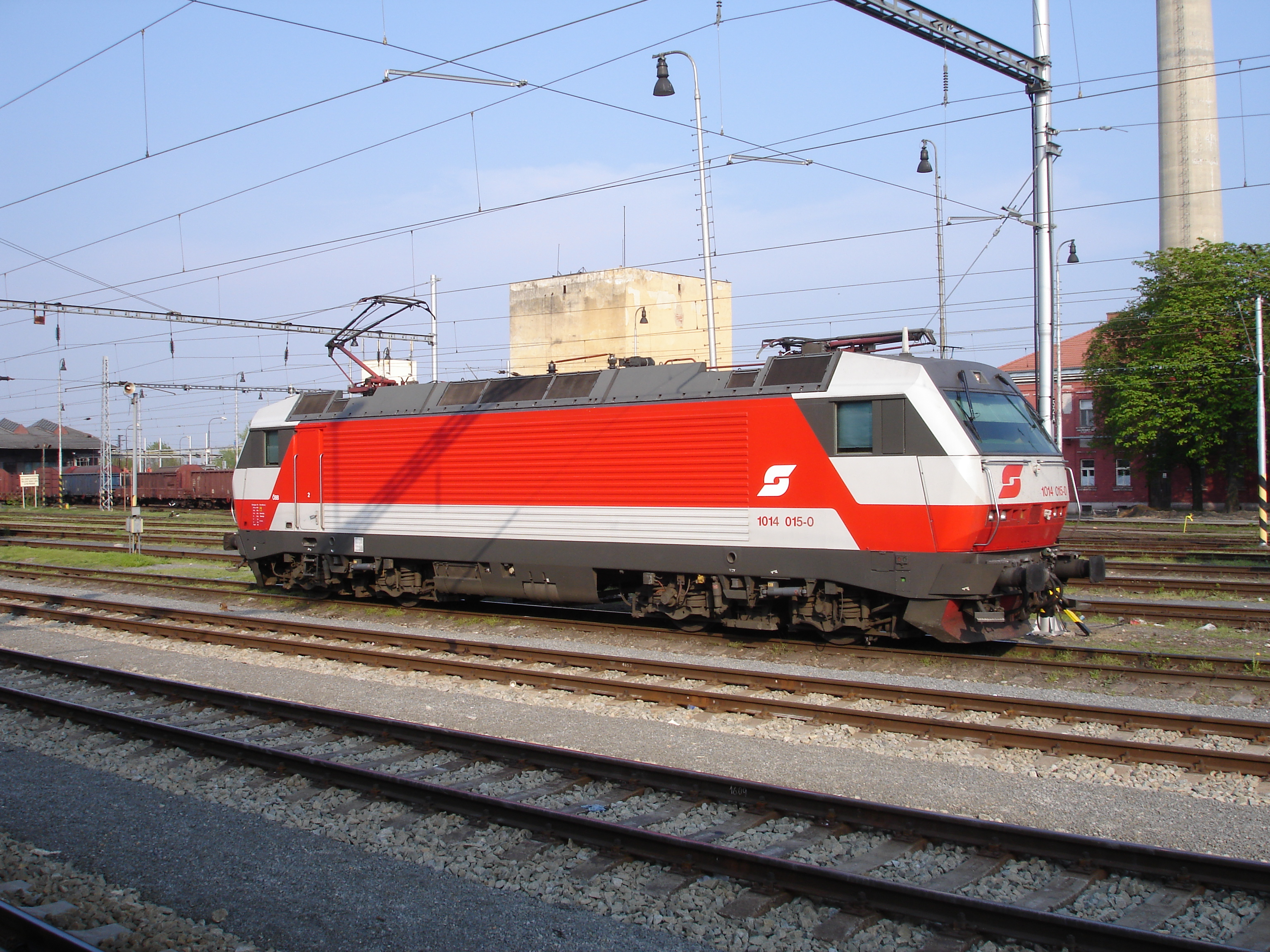
ÖBB 1014

The first operating locos on the SGR were second-hand Austrian Federal Railways class 1014 model electric locomotives. These are primarily used for testing. In addition, TRC has contracted with Korean firms Hyundai Rotem and Sung Shin Rolling Stock Technology for the supply of 17 SGR locomotive engines, 59 accompanying carriages and 10 electric multiple units (EMUs). On 30 December 2023, TRC took delivery of three locomotives as well as 27 passenger carriages (13 business class and 14 economy class carriages), bringing the total number of received carriages to 56. The EMU trainsets are expected to be delivered in batches between March and October 2024.

=== Locomotives ===
Model	Picture	Numbers	Built	Number	Type	Power	Builder (Designer)	Notes
Main Line
1014		1014 014	1993–1994	1	Electric	4023 hp (3000 kW)		Bought as scrap from ÖBB by Yapi-Merkezi for testing.
E6800		E6800-01 – E6800-17	2023–	17	Electric	6800 hp (5000 kW)	Hyundai Rotem; Škoda Transportation	4 out of 17 have been delivered.

=== Trainsets ===
Model	Picture	Numbers	Built	Number Built	Type	Power	Builder (Designer)	Notes
EMU
		EM2401 –	2023–	10	EMU		Hyundai Rotem	10 train sets each with 8 rail cars. First delivery, the EM2401, was made in April of 2024.

== Strike ==
On 5 August 2023, around 2,000 employees from Turkey working on the construction of the railway project, who had not received their salary for 7 months, went on strike. The workers in Tanzania compelled the employers to pay five of the seven months of unpaid wages after 13 days of protests, with a commitment for regular payment being made for the remaining amounts. The strike concluded on 18 August. The workers who had resigned from their positions due to unpaid wages and returned to Turkey started demonstrating in front of Yapı Merkezi's headquarters in Üsküdar, Istanbul on 14 August, under the leadership of Dev-Yapı İş Union, affiliated with DİSK. Their sit-in concluded with a victory after two weeks.

== See also ==
- Central corridor
- East African Railway Master Plan
- Isaka–Kigali Standard Gauge Railway
- Standard-gauge railway
