= Mpwapwa =

- Town
- Location in Tanzania
- Coordinates: 06°20′54″S 36°29′12″E
- Country: Tanzania
- Region: Dodoma Region
- District: Mpwapwa District

Population (2022 census)
  - Total: 30,000
- Time zone: GMT + 3

Mpwapwa is a market town, in the Dodoma Region of Tanzania in central Africa. It is the district capital of Mpwapwa District. According to the 2012 Tanzania National Census, the population of Mpwapwa (Mpwapwa Mjini ward) was 21,337.

== Overview ==
It is one of the oldest colonial districts in Tanzania, boasting local German colonial government headquarters, or bomas, in the early 1890s, and British administrative offices after World War I. It has long been an important educational town, with the oldest teachers' training college in Tanzania (Mpwapwa TTC) and a secondary school dating back to the turn of the century that was originally called the central primary school. This was the only school for local residents who would form the work force for the colonial administration. The school was renovated during colonial rule to become a secondary school for boys. The school had the first African secondary school headmaster in the country, Mr Matthew Ramadhani, a Zanzibari, who died in an underground (subway) accident in the UK while on a study tour. Mpwapwa had one of the oldest veterinary research institutes in Tanzania, at Kikombo, which was later moved to Temeke in Dar es Salaam in the late 1950s. Mpwapwa was a resting post for the reporter/explorer Henry Morton Stanley, where he is believed to have etched a note (in remembrance of W. L. Farquhar) on a rock that is still present near the Anglican missionary Cathedral (All Saints') at Ving'hawe. The district is populated by the Gogo ethnic group in the center and north, and the Hehe ethnic group in the south bordering Iringa region. It is located at 06°21′0″S 36°29′0″E, with a population of about 40,000 serving an area about the size of Wales.

While traditional ways abound with the fabric of society still enriched by a strong embodiment of the predominant Gogo culture, the district is pretty cosmopolitan in its population. Several tribes have made Mpwapwa their home, like the Bena, Nyasa and a few Chaga. The south is populated by the Hehe and the eastern region by the Kaguru.

== Transport ==
Mpwapwa is a fairly mountainous area and takes many hours to travel by car from north to south along the dirt roads that serve the district. The one-time well-kept main road north from Mpwapwa town to Kongwa eventually links to the tarmac road that connects Dar es Salaam to Dodoma. The central line, the railroad from Dar es Salaam to Dodoma and western Tanzania passes directly through Mpwapwa District, at Gulwe station approximately 12 miles south of Mpwapwa town. On June 24, 2002, the Igandu train disaster occurred along the central line at Igandu station close to Dodoma town when a runaway passenger train with over 1,200 people on board rolled downhill into a stationary goods train, killing 281 people, the worst railroad accident in Tanzanian history; many of the injured were treated at the small district hospital in Mpwapwa town. This hospital was opened in 1964 at the behest of the first member of parliament, Ali Saidi Mtaki. He was instrumental in rebuilding the current downtown shortly before independence. Kongwa, a nearby town, had all the amenities left behind after the failed groundnuts scheme in the late forties and early fifties. During the project, Kongwa had a robust European community with schools and paved roads, the remnants of which can be seen in Kongwa today. After independence, Mtaki managed to bring the main electrical power station to Mpwapwa and the current hospital. The hospital was opened in 1964 by Saidi Maswanya, who was then minister of health.
