= Manchali (Tanzanian ward) =

Ward in Dodoma, Tanzania

Manchali Kata ya Manchali
- Ward
- Location within Tanzania
- Coordinates: 6.1478196°S 36.196329°E
- Country: Tanzania
- Region: Dodoma Region
- District: Dodoma Rural
- Ward: Manchali

Population (2016)
  - Total: 11,395
- Time zone: UTC+3 (EAT)

Manchali is an administrative ward in the Dodoma Rural district of the Dodoma Region of Tanzania. In 2016 the Tanzania National Bureau of Statistics report there were 11,395 people in the ward, from 10,485 in 2012.
