= Chali (Tanzanian ward) =

Ward in Bahi, Dodoma, Tanzania

Chali Kata ya Chali
- Ward
- Location within Tanzania
- Coordinates: 6.259042°S 35.255486°E
- Country: Tanzania
- Region: Dodoma Region
- District: Bahi District
- Ward: Chali
- Established: 1984

Government
  - Type: Council

Area
  - Total: 291.1 km^{2} (112.4 sq mi)
- Elevation: 831 m (2,726 ft)

Population (2016)
  - Total: 12,281
  - Density: 42.19/km^{2} (109.3/sq mi)
- Time zone: UTC+3 (EAT)
- Postcode: 41xxx
- Area code: 026
- Website: District Website

Chali (Tanzanian ward) is an administrative ward in the Bahi District of the Dodoma Region of Tanzania. The ward covers an area of 291.1 km^{2} (112.4 sq mi) with an average elevation of 831 m (2,726 ft).

In 2016 the Tanzania National Bureau of Statistics report there were 12,281 people in the ward, from 11,300 in 2012. The ward has 42 inhabitants per square kilometre (110/sq mi).
