= Iringa Mvumi =

Administrative ward in Tanzania

Coordinates: 6°29′S 35°56′E

Iringa Mvumi is an administrative ward in the Dodoma Rural district of the Dodoma Region of Tanzania. According to the 2012 census, the ward's total population was 11,313.
