= Pahi =

Pahi may refer to:

== Places ==
- Páhi, a village in Hungary
- Kampung Pahi, a village in Malaysia
- Pahi River, a river in New Zealand
- Pahi, New Zealand, a village in New Zealand
- Pahi (Tanzanian ward), in Tanzania
- Pahi, Unnao, a village in Sikandarpur Karan CDB, Uttar Pradesh, India

== Other uses ==
- Pahi (ship), a traditional Tahitian watercraft
- Pahi language, a language of Papua-New Guinea
- Pahi language (Nepal), or Pahari, a language of Nepal
- Te Pahi, a Māori tribal leader
