= Msisi =

Msisi may refer to:

- Msisi (Dodoma Rural region), a Tanzanian ward in Dodoma Rural district
- Msisi (Singida Rural ward), a Tanzanian ward in Singida Rural district
