= Idifu =

Administrative ward in Tanzania

Coordinates: 6°26′S 35°59′E

Idifu is an administrative ward in the Chamwino district of the Dodoma Region of Tanzania, with a total population of 10,443 according to 2016 population estimates.
