= Babayu =

Ward in Bahi, Dodoma, Tanzania

Coordinates: 5°38′S 35°42′E

Babayu is an administrative ward in the Bahi District of the Dodoma Region of Tanzania. According to the 2016 population estimates, the ward has a total population of 11,005.
