= Huzi =

Huzi may refer to:

- Huzi, China (瓠子, Hùzǐ), a former name of the town, county, & district Dingtao, Shandong, China
- Huzi, Iran, a village
- Huzi, Tanzania, a ward of Dodoma Rural District, Dodoma Region
- Huzi, tiger-shaped urinals in Chinese culture

== See also ==
- Fuji (disambiguation) for places sometimes romanized as Huzi
