= Itaswi =

Ward in Kondoa, Dodoma, Tanzania

Itaswi is an administrative ward in the Kondoa district of the Dodoma Region of Tanzania. According to 2012 census, the ward has a total population of 9774 people.
