= Nghambaku =

Ward in Chamwino, Dodoma, Tanzania

Nghambaku Kata ya Nghambaku
- Ward
- Location within Tanzania
- Coordinates: 7.017921°S 35.703436°E
- Country: Tanzania
- Region: Dodoma Region
- District: Chamwino District
- Ward: Nghambaku

Population (2016)
  - Total: 7,976
- Time zone: UTC+3 (EAT)

Nghambaku is an administrative ward in the Chamwino District of the Dodoma Region of Tanzania. In 2016 the Tanzania National Bureau of Statistics report there were 7,976 people in the ward, from 7,339 in 2012.
