= Itiso =

Administrative ward in Tanzania

Coordinates: 5°38′S 36°01′E

Itiso is an administrative ward in the Chamwino district of the Dodoma Region of Tanzania. According to the 2016 population estimates, the ward has a total population of 13,733.
