= Kikore =

Ward in Kondoa, Dodoma, Tanzania

Coordinates: 4°21′S 35°50′E

Kikore is an administrative ward in the Kondoa district of the Dodoma Region of Tanzania. According to the 2002 census, the ward has a total population of 10,438.
