= Mvumi Mission =

Ward in Chamwino, Dodoma, Tanzania

Mvumi Misheni Kata ya Mvumi Misheni
- Ward
- Location within Tanzania
- Coordinates: 6.38612504°S 35.9028911°E
- Country: Tanzania
- Region: Dodoma Region
- District: Chamwino District
- Ward: Mvumi Misheni

Population (2016)
  - Total: 17,948
- Time zone: UTC+3 (EAT)

Mvumi Mission, also Mvumi Misheni in kiswahili, is an administrative ward in the Chamwino District of the Dodoma Region of Tanzania. In 2016 the Tanzania National Bureau of Statistics report there were 17,948 people in the ward, from 16,514 in 2012.
