= Mbuga =

Ward in Mpwapwa, Dodoma, Tanzania

Mbuga Kata ya Mbuga
- Ward
- Location within Tanzania
- Coordinates: 6.97886164°S 36.60916945°E
- Country: Tanzania
- Region: Dodoma Region
- District: Mpwapwa district
- Ward: Mbuga

Population (2016)
  - Total: 6,318
- Time zone: UTC+3 (EAT)

Mbuga is an administrative ward in the Mpwapwa district of the Dodoma Region of Tanzania. In 2016 the Tanzania National Bureau of Statistics report there were 6,318 people in the ward, from 5,813 in 2012.
