= Muungano =

Ward in Chamwino, Dodoma, Tanzania

Muungano Kata ya Muungano
- Ward
- Location within Tanzania
- Coordinates: 5.7600591°S 36.548946°E
- Country: Tanzania
- Region: Dodoma Region
- District: Chamwino District
- Ward: Muungano

Population (2016)
  - Total: 11,678
- Time zone: UTC+3 (EAT)

Muungano is an administrative ward in the Chamwino District of the Dodoma Region of Tanzania. In 2016 the Tanzania National Bureau of Statistics report there were 11,678 people in the ward, from 10,745 in 2012.
