= Mpamantwa =

Ward in Bahi, Dodoma, Tanzania

Mpamantwa Kata ya Mpamantwa
- Ward
- Location within Tanzania
- Coordinates: 5.999936°S 35.3841339°E
- Country: Tanzania
- Region: Dodoma Region
- District: Bahi District
- Ward: Mpamantwa

Population (2016)
  - Total: 14,111
- Time zone: UTC+3 (EAT)

Mpamantwa is an administrative ward in the Bahi District of the Dodoma Region of Tanzania. In 2016 the Tanzania National Bureau of Statistics report there were 14,111 people in the ward, from 12,984 in 2012.
