= Lumuma =

Settlement in Tanzania

Coordinates: 6°49′S 36°38′E

Lumuma is an administrative ward in the Mpwapwa district of the Dodoma Region of Tanzania. According to the 2002 census, the ward has a total population of 12,974.
