= Luhundwa =

Ward in Mpwapwa, Dodoma, Tanzania

Luhundwa Kata ya Luhundwa
- Ward
- Location within Tanzania
- Coordinates: 6.800634°S 36.41417°E
- Country: Tanzania
- Region: Dodoma Region
- District: Mpwapwa district
- Ward: Luhundwa

Population (2016)
  - Total: 13,217
- Time zone: UTC+3 (EAT)

Luhundwa is an administrative ward in the Mpwapwa district of the Dodoma Region of Tanzania. In 2016, the Tanzania National Bureau of Statistics report there were 13,217 people in the ward, from 12,161 in 2012.
