= Msamalo =

Administrative ward in Tanzania

Coordinates: 6°16′S 36°01′E

Msamalo is an administrative ward in the Chamwino district of the Dodoma Region of Tanzania. According to the 2016 population estimates, the ward has a total population of 15,370.
