= Hondomairo =

Ward in Kondoa, Dodoma, Tanzania

Hondomairo is an administrative ward in the Kondoa district of the Dodoma Region of Tanzania. According to the 2012 census, the ward has a total population of 8114 people.
