= Massa (Tanzanian ward) =

Administrative ward in Tanzania

Coordinates: 6°59′S 36°27′E

Massa is an administrative ward in the Mpwapwa district of the Dodoma Region of Tanzania, located south zone of Mpwapwa District that is among the wards of Rudi Division. According to the 2002 census, the ward has a total population of 9,812. who mostly practice agricultural activities; livestoke keeping and farming activities for both commercial and food products.

Currently this ward comprise 5 villages; namely, Winza, Chogola, Makose, Njiapanda, and Mkoleko.
