= Farkwa =

Ward in Chemba, Dodoma, Tanzania

Coordinates: 5°24′S 35°36′E

Farkwa is an administrative ward in the Chemba District of the Dodoma Region of Tanzania. According to the 2002 census, the ward has a total population of 9,110.
