= Majeleko =

Ward in Dodoma, Tanzania

Majeleko Kata ya Majeleko
- Ward
- Location within Tanzania
- Coordinates: 6.082667°S 36.1924649°E
- Country: Tanzania
- Region: Dodoma Region
- District: Dodoma Rural
- Ward: Majeleko

Population (2016)
  - Total: 7,484
- Time zone: UTC+3 (EAT)

Majeleko is an administrative ward in the Dodoma Rural district of the Dodoma Region of Tanzania. In 2016 the Tanzania National Bureau of Statistics report there were 7,484 people in the ward, from 6,886 in 2012.
