= Chipanga =

Ward in Bahi, Dodoma, Tanzania

Chipanga Kata ya Chipanga
- Ward
- Location within Tanzania
- Coordinates: 6.262458°S 35.368836°E
- Country: Tanzania
- Region: Dodoma Region
- District: Bahi District
- Ward: Chipanga

Population (2016)
  - Total: 10,492
- Time zone: UTC+3 (EAT)

Chipanga is an administrative ward in the Bahi District of the Dodoma Region of Tanzania. In 2016 the Tanzania National Bureau of Statistics report there were 10,492 people in the ward, from 9,654 in 2012.
