= Mpalanga =

Ward in Bahi, Dodoma, Tanzania

Mpalanga Kata ya Mpalanga
- Ward
- Location within Tanzania
- Coordinates: 6.2848387°S 35.5112976°E
- Country: Tanzania
- Region: Dodoma Region
- District: Bahi District
- Ward: Mpalanga

Population (2016)
  - Total: 11,116
- Time zone: UTC+3 (EAT)

Mpalanga is an administrative ward in the Bahi District of the Dodoma Region of Tanzania. In 2016 the Tanzania National Bureau of Statistics report there were 11,116 people in the ward, from 10,228 in 2012.
