= Ibihwa =

Administrative ward in Tanzania

Coordinates: 5°55′S 35°22′E

Ibihwa is an administrative ward in the Dodoma Rural district of the Dodoma Region of Tanzania. According to 2016 population estimates, the ward has a total population of 12,020.
