= Kikilo =

Ward in Kondoa, Dodoma, Tanzania

Kikilo Kata ya Kikilo
- Ward
- Location within Tanzania
- Coordinates: 4.69196592°S 35.7128067°E
- Country: Tanzania
- Region: Dodoma Region
- District: Kondoa district
- Ward: Kikilo

Population (2016)
  - Total: 10,127
- Time zone: UTC+3 (EAT)

Kikilo is an administrative ward in the Kondoa district of the Dodoma Region of Tanzania. In 2016 the Tanzania National Bureau of Statistics report there were 10,127 people in the ward, from 9,318 in 2012.
