= Chemchem =

Ward in Dodoma Region, Tanzania

Coordinates: 4.9278°S 35.7852°E

Chemchem is an administrative ward in Kondoa District, Dodoma Region, Tanzania. According to the 2012 census, the ward has a total population of 7914
