= Mtitaa =

Ward in Dodoma, Tanzania

Mtitaa Kata ya Mtitaa
- Ward
- Location within Tanzania
- Coordinates: 6.43988487°S 35.594979°E
- Country: Tanzania
- Region: Dodoma Region
- District: Dodoma Rural
- Ward: Mtitaa

Population (2016)
  - Total: 9,351
- Time zone: UTC+3 (EAT)

Mtitaa is an administrative ward in the Dodoma Rural district of the Dodoma Region of Tanzania. In 2016, the Tanzania National Bureau of Statistics report there were 9,351 people in the ward, from 8,604 in 2012.
