= Mazae =

Ward in Mpwapwa, Dodoma, Tanzania

Mazae Kata ya Mazae
- Ward
- Location within Tanzania
- Coordinates: 6.3435154°S 36.4418808°E
- Country: Tanzania
- Region: Dodoma Region
- District: Mpwapwa district
- Ward: Mazae

Population (2016)
  - Total: 8,717
- Time zone: UTC+3 (EAT)

Mazae is an administrative ward in the Mpwapwa district of the Dodoma Region of Tanzania. In 2016 the Tanzania National Bureau of Statistics reported 8,717 people in the ward, from 8,021 in 2012.
