= Songoro =

Ward in Chemba District, Dodoma Region, Tanzania

Songoro Kata ya Songoro
- Ward
- Location within Tanzania
- Coordinates: 5.1279041°S 36.1131055°E
- Country: Tanzania
- Region: Dodoma Region
- District: Chemba District
- Ward: Songoro

Population (2016)
  - Total: 11,685
- Time zone: UTC+3 (EAT)

Songoro is an administrative ward in the Chemba District of the Dodoma Region of Tanzania. In 2016 the Tanzania National Bureau of Statistics report there were 11,685 people in the ward, from 10,751 in 2012.
