= Segala =

Segala may refer to:

- Ségala, a geographic region around Requista, in the departements of Aveyron and Tarn, southern France
- Segala, Tanzania
- Ségala, Mali, town and commune

== See also ==
- Sigala (musician), English DJ and producer
- Sigala, Hiiu County, village in Hiiu Parish, Hiiu County, Estonia
