= Lalta =

Ward in Chemba, Dodoma, Tanzania

Coordinates: 5°10′S 35°18′E

Lalta is an administrative ward in the Chemba District of the Dodoma Region of Tanzania. According to the 2002 census, the ward has a total population of 7,537.
