= Ovada (Tanzanian ward) =

Ward in Chemba, Dodoma, Tanzania

Coordinates: 5°11′S 35°14′E

Ovada is an administrative ward in the Chemba District of the Dodoma Region of Tanzania. According to the 2002 census, the ward had a total population of 9,544.
