= Mundemu =

Administrative ward in Tanzania

Coordinates: 5°55′S 35°41′E

Mundemi is an administrative ward in the Bahi District of the Dodoma Region of Tanzania. According to the 2016 population estimates, the ward has a total population of 8,857.
