= Bolisa =

Ward in Kondoa, Dodoma, Tanzania

Coordinates: 4°27′S 35°44′E

Bolisa is an administrative ward in the Kondoa district of the Dodoma Region of Tanzania. According to the 2012 census, the ward has a total population of 3,644.
