= Matomondo =

Administrative ward in Tanzania

Coordinates: 6°27′S 36°39′E

Matomondo is an administrative ward in the Mpwapwa district of the Dodoma Region of Tanzania. According to the 2002 census, the ward has a total population of 13,660.
