= Mlunduzi =

Administrative ward in Tanzania

Coordinates: 6°44′S 36°12′E

Mlunduzi is an administrative ward in the Mpwapwa district of the Dodoma Region of Tanzania. According to the 2002 census, the ward has a total population of 16,908.
