= Mvumi Makulu =

Administrative ward in Tanzania

Coordinates: 6°21′S 35°50′E

Mvumi Makulu is an administrative ward in the Chamwino district of the Dodoma Region of Tanzania. According to the 2016 population estimates, the ward has a total population of 8,108.
