= Mwitikira =

Ward in Bahi, Dodoma, Tanzania

Mwitikira Kata ya Mwitikira
- Ward
- Location within Tanzania
- Coordinates: 6.50522429°S 35.6788638°E
- Country: Tanzania
- Region: Dodoma Region
- District: Bahi District
- Ward: Mwitikira

Population (2016)
  - Total: 7,863
- Time zone: UTC+3 (EAT)

Mwitikira is an administrative ward in the Bahi District of the Dodoma Region of Tanzania. In 2016, the Tanzania National Bureau of Statistics report there were 7,863 people in the ward, from 7,235 in 2012.
