= Kisese =

Ward in Kondoa, Dodoma, Tanzania

Coordinates: 6°18′S 29°47′E

Kisese is an administrative ward in the Kondoa district of the Dodoma Region of Tanzania. According to the 2002 census, the ward has a total population of 9,810.
