= Chibelela =

Ward in the Dodoma Region of Tanzania

Chibelela Kata ya Chibelela
- Ward
- Location within Tanzania
- Coordinates: 6.3886348°S 35.676404°E
- Country: Tanzania
- Region: Dodoma Region
- District: Bahi District
- Ward: Chibelela
- Established: 1984

Government
  - Type: Council

Area
  - Total: 115.5 km^{2} (44.6 sq mi)
- Elevation: 1,034 m (3,392 ft)

Population (2016)
  - Total: 10,904
  - Density: 94.41/km^{2} (244.5/sq mi)
- Time zone: UTC+3 (EAT)
- Postcode: 41xxx
- Area code: 026
- Website: bahidc.go.tz

Chibelela is an administrative ward in the Bahi District of the Dodoma Region of Tanzania. According to the 2002 census, the ward has a total population of 8,787. The ward covers an area of 115.5 km^{2} (44.6 sq mi) with an average elevation of 1,034 m (3,392 ft).

In 2016 the Tanzania National Bureau of Statistics report there were 10,904 people in the ward, from 10,033 in 2012. The ward has 94 inhabitants per square kilometre (240/sq mi).
