= Tanzanian wine =

Wine making in Tanzania

Tanzanian wine industry is based entirely in Dodoma Region and is the second largest producer of wine in Sub-Saharan Africa after South Africa. Compared to the rest of the world, the history of wine in Tanzania is very recent and dates back to just a few years before independence. Tanzania only has one major grape growing region and it is based around the legislative capital city Dodoma. The most common grape varietals in the Dodoma wine region are Chenin Blanc, Syrah, Cabernet Sauvignon and a variety named for a Dodoma sub-region, Makutupora. Initially wine production and grape growing was limited to missionaries, however, in 1969 the government entered the market with the formation of the Dodoma Wine company.

== History ==
=== Early history ===
Vines were first introduced in the country by members of the Roman Catholic Congregation of the Holy Ghost in 1938. The missionaries from the Hombolo Catholic mission planted their first vines near the Kondoa District in Dodoma Region. Initially the vines grown were used for domestically making wine for religious practises and domestic consumption. In 1957 Passionist Father Irioneo Maggioni, of the Bihawana Mission started his own commercial farm from three vine seedlings out of curiosity and the farm grew rapidly to a commercial scale.

After independence the local government took interest in the industry and made their first investment into a four-acre grape farm at Dodoma Isanga Prison 1961. The program was very successful and in just three years expanded to 5 of the nearby villages centered around the prison. In 1963, the national service camp in Makutupora also joined the scheme and began growing grapes in the village that created a new center for grape growing around the village. In 1969 the prison built a winery plant and was Tanzania's sole purchaser of grapes for wine production in the country.

In 1979, in a plan to add value for the local farmers the central government invested in a new company and created the Dodoma Wine Company, which directly procured grapes from the farmers for wine production. The company assisted farmers in grape growing practises and set up a research center called the Makutupora Grapevine Research Centre.

=== International investment ===
International investors mainly from South Africa began to take interest in the industry in the early 1990s. In 1999 South Africa's Distell Group Limited acquired a stake in the local Tanzania Breweries Limited subsidiary Tanzania Distilleries Limited (TDL). TDL acquired the Dodoma Wine Company and bought the brand of the government. The company brought in investment and skill to the farmers to help manage their farms at a low cost. The company currently holds the highest market share of wine in country with their flagship brand "Dodoma Wine". As the company continued to invest in the production capacity, the company also began importing South African wine into the country to help develop the market.

Simultaneously, in 2002 an Italian engineer started the Central Tanzania Wine company, which today is part of the top three company producing wine in the country. Between 1998 and 2013, wine exports in the country skyrocketed and grew by 900 times. In 1998 the country exported 176 kg worth of wine and in 2013 exported 151,221 kg.

== Makutupora ==
Makutupora is a local grape varietal named after a district in the Dodoma Region where it is grown. The Makutupora is a local dry red grape that grows in dry earth, sandy soil with low humidity. There are two harvests seasons a year, in March and August/September.

== Wineries ==
- Dodoma Wine Company (dowico)
- Central Tanzania Wine Company (cetawico)
- Sixville wine
- Alko Vintages
- KokuTuty Estate Winery (UPENDO Canna & Balozi Wines)
- Robbins Enterprises (Tully's Wine)
- Kings wine
- Central Hills Winery

== See also ==
- Agriculture in Tanzania
- Beer in Tanzania
- Winemaking
- Tanzanian cuisine
