= Ilindi =

Administrative ward in Tanzania

Coordinates: 6°01′S 35°34′E

Ilindi is an administrative ward in the Bahi District of the Dodoma Region of Tanzania, with a total population of 10,260 according to 2016 population estimates.
