= Kimagai =

Ward in Mpwapwa, Dodoma, Tanzania

Kimagai Kata ya Kimagai
- Ward
- Location within Tanzania
- Coordinates: 6.5107331°S 36.586387°E
- Country: Tanzania
- Region: Dodoma Region
- District: Mpwapwa district
- Ward: Kimagai

Population (2016)
  - Total: 7,977
- Time zone: UTC+3 (EAT)

Kimagai is an administrative ward in the Mpwapwa district of the Dodoma Region of Tanzania. In 2016 the Tanzania National Bureau of Statistics report there were 7,977 people in the ward, from 7,340 in 2012.
