= Soera =

Ward in Kondoa, Dodoma, Tanzania

Soera Kata ya Soera
- Ward
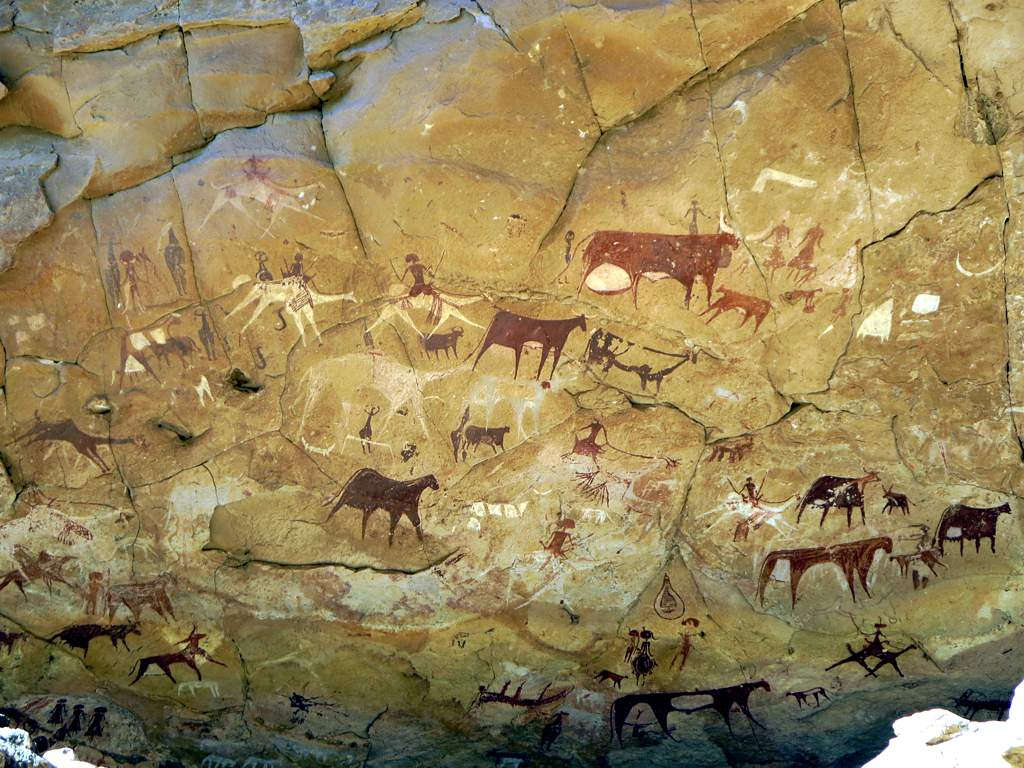
- UNESCO World Haritage Kondoa Rock-Art of the Fenga site in Soera Ward.

- Location within Tanzania
- Coordinates: 4.6125152°S 35.7641148°E
- Country: Tanzania
- Region: Dodoma Region
- District: Kondoa District
- Ward: Soera

Population (2016)
  - Total: 8,277
- Time zone: UTC+3 (EAT)

Soera is an administrative ward in the Kondoa District of the Dodoma Region of Tanzania. It has four administrative villages Humai, Bukulu, Soera and Kwadinu. In 2016 the Tanzania National Bureau of Statistics report there were 8,277 people in the ward, from 7,616 in 2012.

Many of the Kondoa Rock-Art Sites, that are UNESCO World Heritage Sites, are located within the Soera Ward. The Fenga site is in the ward that include one of the most known paintings of people trying to capture large animals, including elephants.
