= Ibugule =

Ward in Dodoma, Tanzania

Ibugule Kata ya Ibugule
- Ward
- Location within Tanzania
- Coordinates: 6.3916838°S 35.5158817°E
- Country: Tanzania
- Region: Dodoma Region
- District: Dodoma Rural
- Ward: Ibugule

Population (2016)
  - Total: 8,745
- Time zone: UTC+3 (EAT)

Ibugule is an administrative ward in the Dodoma Rural district of the Dodoma Region of Tanzania. In 2016 the Tanzania National Bureau of Statistics report there were 8,745 people in the ward, from 8,046 in 2012.
