= Sandawe =

Sandawe may refer to:

- Sandawe people, of central Tanzania
- Sandawe language, spoken by the Sandawe people
