= Suruke =

Ward in Kondoa, Dodoma, Tanzania

Coordinates: 4°57′S 35°46′E

Suruke is an administrative ward in the Kondoa district of the Dodoma Region of Tanzania. According to the 2002 census, the ward has a total population of 11,711.
