= Chemba =

Ward in Chemba, Dodoma, Tanzania

Chemba Kata ya Chemba
- Ward
- Location within Tanzania
- Coordinates: 5.243856°S 35.88954°E
- Country: Tanzania
- Region: Dodoma Region
- District: Chemba District
- Ward: Chemba

Population (2016)
  - Total: 5,341
- Time zone: UTC+3 (EAT)

Chemba is an administrative ward in the Chemba District of the Dodoma Region of Tanzania. In 2016 the Tanzania National Bureau of Statistics report there were 5,341 people in the district, from 16,047 in 2012.
