= Mnenia =

Ward in Kondoa, Dodoma, Tanzania

Mnenia Kata ya Mnenia
- Ward
- Location within Tanzania
- Coordinates: 4.694997°S 35.871015°E
- Country: Tanzania
- Region: Dodoma Region
- District: Kondoa District
- Ward: Mnenia

Population (2016)
  - Total: 12,529
- Time zone: UTC+3 (EAT)

Mnenia is an administrative ward in the Kondoa District of the Dodoma Region of Tanzania. In 2016, the Tanzania National Bureau of Statistics have reported that there were 12,529 people in the ward from 11,528 in 2012.
