= Thawi =

Ward in Kondoa, Dodoma, Tanzania

Thawi Kata ya Thawi
- Ward
- Location within Tanzania
- Coordinates: 4.713869°S 35.7234002°E
- Country: Tanzania
- Region: Dodoma Region
- District: Kondoa District
- Ward: Thawi

Population (2016)
  - Total: 11,737
- Time zone: UTC+3 (EAT)

Thawi is an administrative ward in the Kondoa District of the Dodoma Region of Tanzania. In 2016 the Tanzania National Bureau of Statistics report there were 11,737 people in the ward, from 10,799 in 2012.
