= Nondwa =

Administrative ward in Tanzania

Coordinates: 9°24′0″S 39°26′0″E

Nondwa is an administrative ward in the Bahi District of the Dodoma Region of Tanzania. According to 2016 population estimates, the ward has a total population of 7,665.
