= Paranga, Tanzania =

Ward in Chemba, Dodoma, Tanzania

Paranga Kata ya Paranga
- Ward
- Location within Tanzania
- Coordinates: 5.17844675°S 35.863154°E
- Country: Tanzania
- Region: Dodoma Region
- District: Chemba District
- Ward: Paranga

Population (2016)
  - Total: 13,365
- Time zone: UTC+3 (EAT)

Paranga is an administrative ward in the Chemba District of the Dodoma Region of Tanzania. In 2016 the Tanzania National Bureau of Statistics report there were 13,365 people in the ward, from 12,297 in 2012.
