= Dalai =

Dalai may refer to:

- Dalai Lama
- Dalai nuur, a lake in Inner Mongolia, China
- Dalai (Tanzanian ward), a region in Tanzania
- Dalai, Dali, unit of measure
