= Kwamtoro =

Ward in Chemba, Dodoma, Tanzania

Kwamtoro Kata ya Kwamtoro
- Ward
- Location within Tanzania
- Coordinates: 5.225302°S 35.4249°E
- Country: Tanzania
- Region: Dodoma Region
- District: Chemba District
- Ward: Kwamtoro

Population (2016)
  - Total: 10,635
- Time zone: UTC+3 (EAT)

Kwamtoro is an administrative ward in the Chemba District of the Dodoma Region of Tanzania. It is made of six villages which are Kwamtoro, Msera, Banguma, Kurio, Ndoroboni and Mialo. The dominant Tribe is Sandawe people and their Language is Sandawe However other tribes also are found in minority. Msera is mainly dominated with Turu people and Ndoroboni by 2000s was occupied by Turu people migrants from villages of singida Region In 2016 the Tanzania National Bureau of Statistics report there were 10,635 people in the ward, from 9,785 in 2012.
