= Mima (Tanzanian ward) =

Administrative ward in Tanzania

Coordinates: 6°32′S 36°08′E

Mima is an administrative ward in the Mpwapwa district of the Dodoma Region of Tanzania. According to the 2002 census, the ward has a total population of 17,341.
