= Makorongo =

Ward in Chemba, Dodoma, Tanzania

Coordinates: 5°29′S 35°38′E

Makorongo is an administrative ward in the Chemba District of the Dodoma Region of Tanzania. According to the 2002 census, the ward has a total population of 12,835.
