= Goima =

Ward in Chemba, Dodoma, Tanzania

Coordinates: 5°06′S 36°01′E

Goima is an administrative ward in the Chemba District of the Dodoma Region of Tanzania. According to the 2002 census, the ward has a total population of 20,309. The ward is mainly populated by Burunge, Rangi, Iraqwi tribes. It is known to be the home of the Burunge tribe after leaving their original land in the run of chaos from Rangi people currently known as "Kondoa Irangi"
