= Haneti =

Ward in Dodoma, Tanzania

Coordinates: 5°29′S 35°53′E

- Ward
- Kata ya Haneti
- Location within Tanzania
- Country: Tanzania
- Region: Dodoma Region
- District: Dodoma Rural District

Population
  - Total: 10,791

Haneti is an administrative ward in the Dodoma Rural district of the Dodoma Region of Tanzania. According to the 2002 census, the ward has a total population of 10,791. Haneti is home to the only opal gemstone mine in The country.
