= Mlowa Bwawani =

Ward in Chamwino, Dodoma, Tanzania

Mlowa Bwawani Kata ya Mlowa Bwawani
- Ward
- Location within Tanzania
- Coordinates: 6.607948°S 35.821781°E
- Country: Tanzania
- Region: Dodoma Region
- District: Chamwino District
- Ward: Mlowa Bwawani

Population (2016)
  - Total: 9,815
- Time zone: UTC+3 (EAT)

Mlowa Bwawani is an administrative ward in the Chamwino District of the Dodoma Region of Tanzania. In 2016 the Tanzania National Bureau of Statistics report there were 9,815 people in the ward, from 9,031 in 2012.
