= Bumbuta =

Ward in Kondoa, Dodoma, Tanzania

Bumbuta Kata ya Bumbuta
- Ward
- Location within Tanzania
- Coordinates: 4.645711°S 35.952672°E
- Country: Tanzania
- Region: Dodoma Region
- District: Kondoa district
- Ward: Bumbuta

Population (2016)
  - Total: 9,349
- Time zone: UTC+3 (EAT)

Bumbuta is an administrative ward in the Kondoa district of the Dodoma Region of Tanzania. In 2016 the Tanzania National Bureau of Statistics report there were 9,349 people in the ward, from 8,602 in 2012.
