= Ikowa =

Administrative ward in Tanzania

Coordinates: 6°14′S 36°10′E

Ikowa is an administrative ward in the Chamwino district of the Dodoma Region of Tanzania, with a total population of 6,874 according to 2016 population estimates.
