= Itololo =

Ward in Kondoa, Dodoma, Tanzania

Itololo is an administrative ward in the Kondoa district of the Dodoma Region of Tanzania. According to the 2012 census, the ward has a total population 9,774.
