= Chikola =

Chikola may refer to:

- Chikola, Russia, a rural locality (a selo) in the Republic of North Ossetia–Alania, Russia
- Chikola (Dodoma Rural ward), a Tanzanian ward in Dodoma Rural region
- Chikola (Manyoni ward), a Tanzanian ward in Manyoni region
