= Msanga =

Msanga Kata ya Msanga
- Ward
- Location within Tanzania
- Coordinates: 7.273487°S 38.76548143°E
- Country: Tanzania
- Region: Dodoma Region
- District: Chamwino District
- Ward: Msanga

Population (2016)
  - Total: 10,502
- Time zone: UTC+3 (EAT)

Msanga is an administrative ward in the Chamwino District of the Dodoma Region of Tanzania. In 2016 the Tanzania National Bureau of Statistics report there were 10,502 people in the ward, from 9,663 in 2012.
