= Makanda (Bahi District) =

Administrative ward in Tanzania

Makanda is an administrative ward in the Bahi District of the Dodoma Region of Tanzania. In 2016 the Tanzania National Bureau of Statistics report there were 8,582 people in the ward, from 7,896 in 2012.
