= Wotta =

Administrative ward in Tanzania

Coordinates: 6°41′S 36°18′E

Wotta is an administrative ward in the Mpwapwa district of the Dodoma Region of Tanzania. According to the 2002 census, the ward has a total population of 10,538.
