= Ipera =

Ward in Mpwapwa, Dodoma, Tanzania

Ipera Kata ya Ipera
- Ward
- Location within Tanzania
- Coordinates: 6.866858°S 34.933547°E
- Country: Tanzania
- Region: Dodoma Region
- District: Mpwapwa district
- Ward: Ipera

Population (2016)
  - Total: 8,362
- Time zone: UTC+3 (EAT)

Ipera is an administrative ward in the Mpwapwa district of the Dodoma Region of Tanzania. In 2016 the Tanzania National Bureau of Statistics report there were 8,362 people in the ward, from 12,870 in 2012.
