= Pwaga =

Town in Tanzania

Coordinates: 6.698°S 36.6°E

Pwaga is an administrative ward in the Mpwapwa District of the Dodoma Region of Tanzania. According to the 2016 population estimates, the ward has a total population of 12,191.
