= Swaga Swaga Game Reserve =

Protected Area in Dodoma Region, Tanzania

Coordinates: 4.925°S 35.470°E

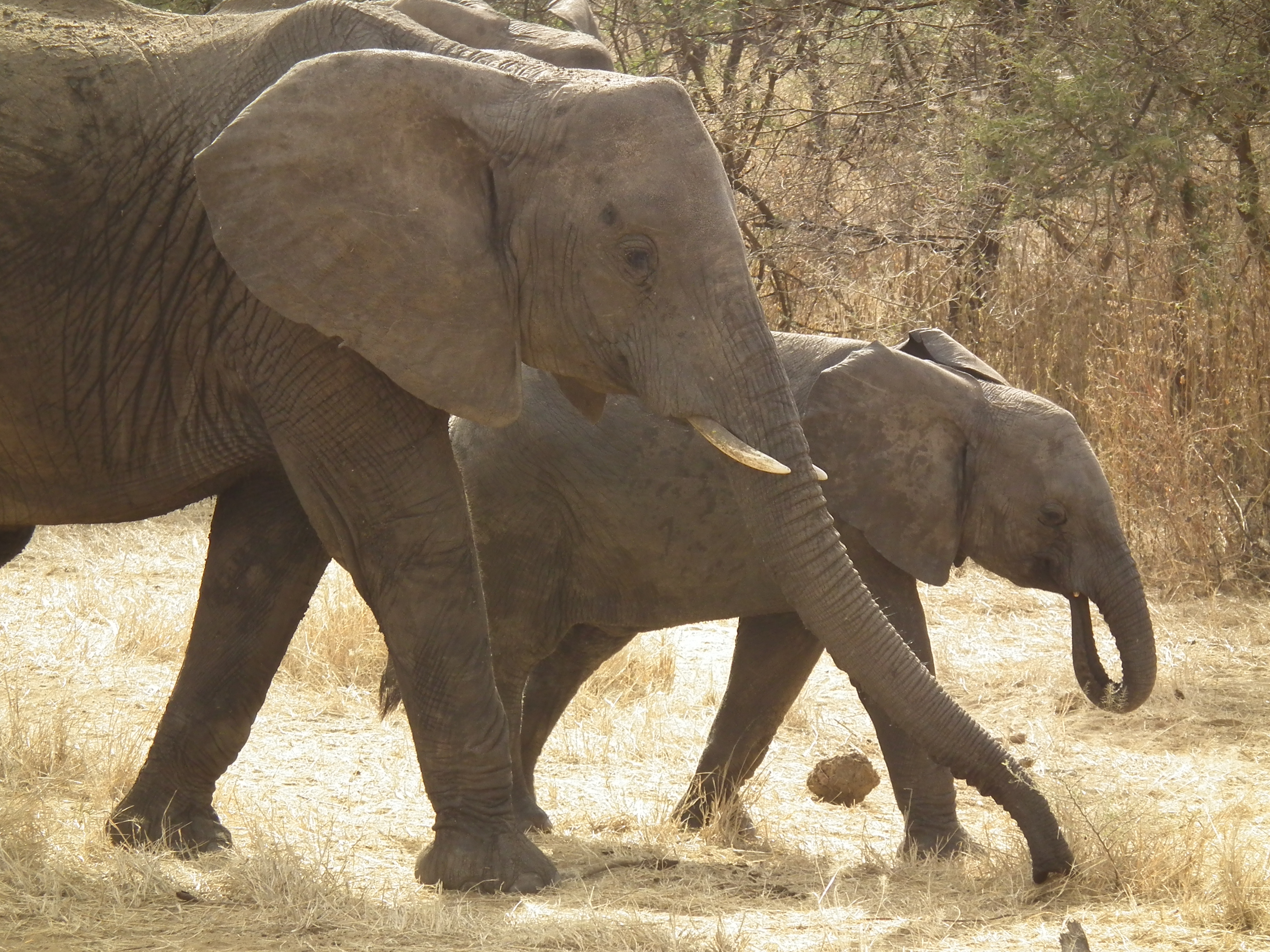
An elephant migrating around their sighting.

Swaga Swaga Game Reserve is a Tanzanian game reserve located in northwest Dodoma Region, that gives refuge to elephants and other vulnerable animals. It is located 50.6 miles from the city of Babati.

It covers an area of 871 square kilometers.

Swaga Swaga also contains 102 lions, and since Tanzania has the most lions in Africa, Swaga Swaga has almost 0.6% of Tanzania's sighted lions.

In 2017, the Tanzania Wildlife Management Authority (TAWA) began an action to relocate many animal species from other reserves to improve fauna diversity. In this they see a great chance for the development of tourism and the promotion of Swaga Swaga.

In February 2021, Polish archaeologist from Jagiellonian University announced the discovery of ancient rock art with anthropomorphic figures in a good condition at the Amak’hee 4 rockshelter site. Paintings made with a reddish dye also contained buffalo heads, giraffe's head and neck, domesticated cattle dated back to about several hundred years ago. Archaeologists estimated that these paintings can describe a ritual of the Sandawe people, although their present religion does not contain elements of anthropomorphization of buffaloes.
