= Mpendo =

Ward in Chemba, Dodoma, Tanzania

Mpendo Kata ya Mpendo
- Ward
- Location within Tanzania
- Coordinates: 5.5697619°S 35.3247642°E
- Country: Tanzania
- Region: Dodoma Region
- District: Chemba District
- Ward: Mpendo

Population (2016)
  - Total: 7,605
- Time zone: UTC+3 (EAT)

Mpendo is an administrative ward in the Chemba District of the Dodoma Region of Tanzania. In 2016 the Tanzania National Bureau of Statistics report there were 7,605 people in the ward, from 6,997 in 2012.
