= Chunyu (ward) =

Ward in Mpwapwa, Dodoma, Tanzania

Chunyu Kata ya Chunyu
- Ward
- Location within Tanzania
- Coordinates: 6.28169°S 36.330704°E
- Country: Tanzania
- Region: Dodoma Region
- District: Mpwapwa district
- Ward: Chunyu

Population (2016)
  - Total: 12,600
- Time zone: UTC+3 (EAT)

Chunyu is an administrative ward in the Mpwapwa district of the Dodoma Region of Tanzania. In 2016 the Tanzania National Bureau of Statistics report there were 12,600 people in the ward, from 11,593 in 2012.
