= Chandama =

Ward in Dodoma Region, Tanzania

Coordinates: 5°09′S 36°10′E

Chandama is an administrative ward in the Chemba District of the Dodoma Region of Tanzania. According to the 2002 census, the ward has a total population of 24,143.
