= Rudi (Tanzanian ward) =

Borders of Tanzania

Coordinates: 6°58′S 36°16′E

Rudi is an administrative ward in the Mpwapwa district of the Dodoma Region of Tanzania. According to the 2002 census, the ward has a total population of 18,694.
