= Busi (Tanzanian ward) =

Ward in Kondoa, Dodoma, Tanzania

Coordinates: 4.73328°S 36.205008°E

Busi is an administrative ward in the Kondoa district of the Dodoma Region of Tanzania. In 2016 the Tanzania National Bureau of Statistics report there were 8,459 people in the ward, from 18,724 in 2012.
