= Buigiri =

Administrative ward in Tanzania

Coordinates: 6°08′S 36°02′E

Buigiri is an administrative ward in the Chamwino district of the Dodoma Region of Tanzania. According to the 2016 population estimates, the ward has a total population of 9,052.
