= Berege =

Administrative ward in Tanzania

Coordinates: 6°30′S 36°17′E

Berege is an administrative ward in the Mpwapwa district of the Dodoma Region of Tanzania. According to the 2002 census, the ward has a total population of 15,770.
