= Mondo (Chemba) =

Ward in Chemba, Dodoma, Tanzania

Mondo Kata ya Mondo
- Ward
- Location within Tanzania
- Coordinates: 5°00′23″S 35°56′09″E
- Country: Tanzania
- Region: Dodoma Region
- District: Chemba District
- Ward: Mondo

Population (2016)
  - Total: 10,318
- Time zone: UTC+3 (EAT)

Mondo is an administrative ward in the Chemba District of the Dodoma Region of Tanzania. In 2016 the Tanzania National Bureau of Statistics report there were 10,318 people in the ward, from 9,494 in 2012.
