= Makang'wa =

Ward in Chamwino, Dodoma, Tanzania

Makang'wa Kata ya Makang'wa
- Ward
- Location within Tanzania
- Coordinates: 6.4873261°S 35.8380572°E
- Country: Tanzania
- Region: Dodoma Region
- District: Chamwino District
- Ward: Makang'wa

Population (2016)
  - Total: 7,937
- Time zone: UTC+3 (EAT)

Makang'wa is an administrative ward in the Chamwino District of the Dodoma Region of Tanzania. In 2016 the Tanzania National Bureau of Statistics report there were 7,937 people in the ward, from 20,337 in 2012.

{
