= Jangalo =

Ward in Chemba, Dodoma, Tanzania

Coordinates: 5°01′S 36°12′E

Jangalo is an administrative ward in the Chemba District of the Dodoma Region of Tanzania. According to the 2002 census, the ward has a total population of 21,432.
