= Mpwapwa District =

- District
- Mpwapwa District of Dodoma Region.
- Coordinates: 06°20′54″S 36°29′12″E
- Country: Tanzania
- Region: Dodoma Region

Area
  - Total: 7,455 km^{2} (2,878 sq mi)

Population (2022 census)
  - Total: 403,247
  - Density: 54.09/km^{2} (140.1/sq mi)

Mpwapwa District is one of the seven districts of the Dodoma Region of Tanzania. It is bordered to the north by Kongwa District (site of the failed British groundnut scheme), to the east by Morogoro Region, to the south by Iringa Region, and to the west by Chamwino District. Its district capital is the town of Mpwapwa.

== Geography ==
Most Mpwapwa residents live on the central plateau at about 3,500 ft above sea level, though others, mainly from the minority Hehe ethnic group, live atop the 7,000 ft mountains that benefit from better rainfall. The district is fairly arid and only gets good rains 2 years out of every 7.

== Demographics ==
According to the 2022 Tanzania National Census, the population of Mpwapwa District was 403,247.

According to the 2012 Tanzania National Census, the population of Mpwapwa District was 305,056.

According to the 2002 Tanzania National Census, the population of the Mpwapwa District was 254,500.

== Transport ==
Paved trunk road T5 from Dodoma to Iringa passes through the southern part of the district.

The central railway of Tanzania passes through Mpwapwa District as well, with one station being located in Gulwe.

== Administrative subdivisions ==
As of 2012, Mpwapwa District was administratively divided into 30 wards.

=== Wards ===
- Berege
- Chipogoro
- Chitemo
- Chunyu
- Galigali
- Godegode
- Gulwe
- Ipera
- Iwondo
- Kibakwe
- Kimagai
- Kingiti
- Lufu
- Luhundwa
- Lumuma
- Lupeta
- Malolo
- Massa
- Matomondo
- Mazae
- Mbuga
- Mima
- Mlunduzi
- Mpwapwa
- Mtera
- Nghambi
- Pwaga
- Rudi
- Vingh'awe
- Wotta
