= Lamaiti =

Ward in Bahi, Dodoma, Tanzania

Lamaiti Kata ya Lamaiti
- Ward
- Location within Tanzania
- Coordinates: 5.7894288°S 35.4872865°E
- Country: Tanzania
- Region: Dodoma Region
- District: Bahi District
- Ward: Lamaiti

Population (2016)
  - Total: 13,333
- Time zone: UTC+3 (EAT)

Lamaiti is an administrative ward in the Bahi District of the Dodoma Region of United Republic of Tanzania. In 2016 the Tanzania National Bureau of Statistics report there were 13,333 people in the ward, from 12,268 in 2012.
