= Mpwayungu =

Ward in Chamwino, Dodoma, Tanzania

Mpwayungu Kata ya Mpwayungu
- Ward
- Location within Tanzania
- Coordinates: 6.7159664°S 35.568816°E
- Country: Tanzania
- Region: Dodoma Region
- District: Chamwino District
- Ward: Mpwayungu

Population (2016)
  - Total: 13,731
- Time zone: UTC+3 (EAT)

Mpwayungu is an administrative ward in the Chamwino District of the Dodoma Region of Tanzania. In 2016 the Tanzania National Bureau of Statistics report there were 13,731 people in the ward, from 12,634 in 2012.
