= Bereko =

Ward in Kondoa, Dodoma, Tanzania

Coordinates: 4°27′S 35°44′E

Bereko is an administrative ward in the Kondoa district of the Dodoma Region of Tanzania. According to the 2002 census, the ward has a total population of 3,147.
