= Manzase =

Ward in Chamwino, Dodoma, Tanzania

Manzase Kata ya Manzase
- Ward
- Location within Tanzania
- Coordinates: 6.60956773°S 35.92834786°E
- Country: Tanzania
- Region: Dodoma Region
- District: Chamwino District
- Ward: Manzase

Population (2016)
  - Total: 12,482
- Time zone: UTC+3 (EAT)

Manzase is an administrative ward in the Chamwino District of the Dodoma Region of Tanzania. In 2016 the Tanzania National Bureau of Statistics report there were 12,482 people in the ward, from 11,485 in 2012.
