= Changaa (Tanzanian ward) =

Ward in Kondoa, Dodoma, Tanzania

Changaa Kata ya Changaa
- Ward
- Location within Tanzania
- Coordinates: 4.80070°S 35.697221°E
- Country: Tanzania
- Region: Dodoma Region
- District: Kondoa district
- Ward: Changaa

Population (2016)
  - Total: 10,471
- Time zone: UTC+3 (EAT)

Changaa is an administrative ward in the Kondoa district of the Dodoma Region of Tanzania. In 2016 the Tanzania National Bureau of Statistics report there were 10,471 people in the ward, from 9,634 in 2012.
