= Joyce Kinabo =

Tanzanian food scientist

- Born: 22 July 1955 (age 71); Mpwapwa, Tanzania
- Education: University of Dar es Salaam BA; University of Leeds MA; University of Glasgow PhD
- Spouse: Ludovick Dominic Kinabo (1983–present)
- Children: Heri Christopher Kinabo; Mariana Kinabo
- Parent(s): David Peter Chisawilo (Father); Ekilia David Chitungo-Chisawilo (Mother)
- Scientific career
- Fields: Human Nutrition
- Workplaces: Sokoine University of Agriculture

Joyce Ludovick Kinabo (born 1955, as Joyce Chisawilo) is a Tanzanian academic professor and researcher. She works at Sokoine University of Agriculture (SUA) in Morogoro, Tanzania, in the Department of Food Technology, where she researches and teaches various aspects of nutritional science.

== Education and honors ==
Kinabo was born on 22 July 1955 to David Peter Chisawilo and Ekilia David Chitungo-Chisawilo in the Mpwapwa, Dodoma region, Tanzania.

When she graduated from high school, Joyce was selected to attend the Kilakala Girls High School in 1975 and after graduating performed her compulsory year of public service. In 1980, she obtain her bachelor's degree in agriculture with a major in Food Science and Technology from University of Dar es Salaam. She went to work at the Tanzania Food and Nutrition Center.

By 1984 she had earned a Master of Science degree in food science from University of Leeds in England and in 1990 received her Doctor of Science in Nutritional Physiology from University of Glasgow. Scotland.

== See also ==
- Andrew Tarimo – Tanzanian irrigation engineer
