= Godegode =

Ward in Mpwapwa, Dodoma, Tanzania

Godegode Kata ya Godegode
- Ward
- Location within Tanzania
- Coordinates: 6.5376407°S 36.560996°E
- Country: Tanzania
- Region: Dodoma Region
- District: Mpwapwa district
- Ward: Godegode

Population (2016)
  - Total: 8,569
- Time zone: UTC+3 (EAT)

Gode Gode is an administrative ward in the Mpwapwa district of the Dodoma Region of Tanzania. In 2016 the Tanzania National Bureau of Statistics report there were 8,569 people in the ward, from 7,884 in 2012.
