= Masange =

Ward in Kondoa, Dodoma, Tanzania

Coordinates: 4°36′S 35°48′E

Masange is an administrative ward in the Kondoa district of the Dodoma Region of Tanzania. According to the 2002 census, the ward has a population of 12,348.
