= Gwandi =

Ward in Chemba, Dodoma, Tanzania

Gwandi Kata ya Gwandi
- Ward
- Location within Tanzania
- Coordinates: 5.44822°S 36.03896°E
- Country: Tanzania
- Region: Dodoma Region
- District: Chemba District
- Established: 1984

Government
  - Type: Council

Area
  - Total: 659.9 km^{2} (254.8 sq mi)
- Elevation: 1,211 m (3,973 ft)

Population (2012)
  - Total: 3,834
  - Density: 5.810/km^{2} (15.05/sq mi)
- Time zone: EAT
- Postcode: 41xxx
- Area code: 027
- Website: District Website

Gwandi is an administrative ward in the Chemba District of the Dodoma Region of Tanzania. The ward covers an area of 659.9 square kilometres (254.8 sq mi) with an average elevation of 1,211 metres (3,973 ft).

In 2016 reports there were 3,834 people in the ward, from 7,971 in 2012, and 6,354 in 2002. The ward has 5.8 inhabitants per square kilometre (15/sq mi).
