= Kingale =

Ward in Kondoa, Dodoma, Tanzania

Kingale Kata ya Kingale
- Ward
- Location within Tanzania
- Coordinates: 5.058107°S 35.765905°E
- Country: Tanzania
- Region: Dodoma Region
- District: Kondoa district
- Ward: Kingale

Population (2016)
  - Total: 11,958
- Time zone: UTC+3 (EAT)

Kingale is an administrative ward in the Kondoa district of the Dodoma Region of Tanzania. In 2016 the Tanzania National Bureau of Statistics report there were 11,958 people in the ward, from 11,003 in 2012.
