= Chinugulu =

Ward in Chamwino, Dodoma, Tanzania

Chinugulu Kata ya Chinugulu
- Ward
- Location within Tanzania
- Coordinates: 6.8868433°S 35.424196°E
- Country: Tanzania
- Region: Dodoma Region
- District: Chamwino District
- Ward: Chinugulu

Population (2016)
  - Total: 5,669
- Time zone: UTC+3 (EAT)

Chinugulu is an administrative ward in the Chamwino District of the Dodoma Region of Tanzania. In 2016 the Tanzania National Bureau of Statistics report there were 5,669 people in the ward, from 5,216 in 2012.
