= Membe =

Membe may refer to:

People

- Bernard Membe (born 1953), Tanzanian politician
- Fred M'membe (born 1959), Zambian journalist

Places

- Membe, Tanzania, an administrative ward
