= Pahi River =

Coordinates: 36°09′S 174°14′E

Location
- Country: New Zealand

Physical characteristics
- Mouth
  - location: Arapaoa River, Kaipara Harbour
- Length: 15 km (9.3 mi)

The Pahi River is a river of the Northland Region of New Zealand's North Island. It flows generally west from its origins southwest of Maungaturoto, and the last few kilometres of its length form an upper silty arm of the Kaipara Harbour. It forms one of the arms of the Arapaoa River, in the northeastern part of the harbour's system.

== See also ==
- List of rivers of New Zealand
