= Dabalo =

Administrative ward in Dodoma Region, Tanzania

Coordinates: 5°47′S 36°09′E

Dabalo is an administrative ward in the Dodoma Region of Tanzania. According to the 2002 census, the ward had a total population of 12,627. By 2022, the population had risen to 26,241.
