= ÖBB Class 1014 =

Class of Austrian electric locomotives

ÖBB 1014
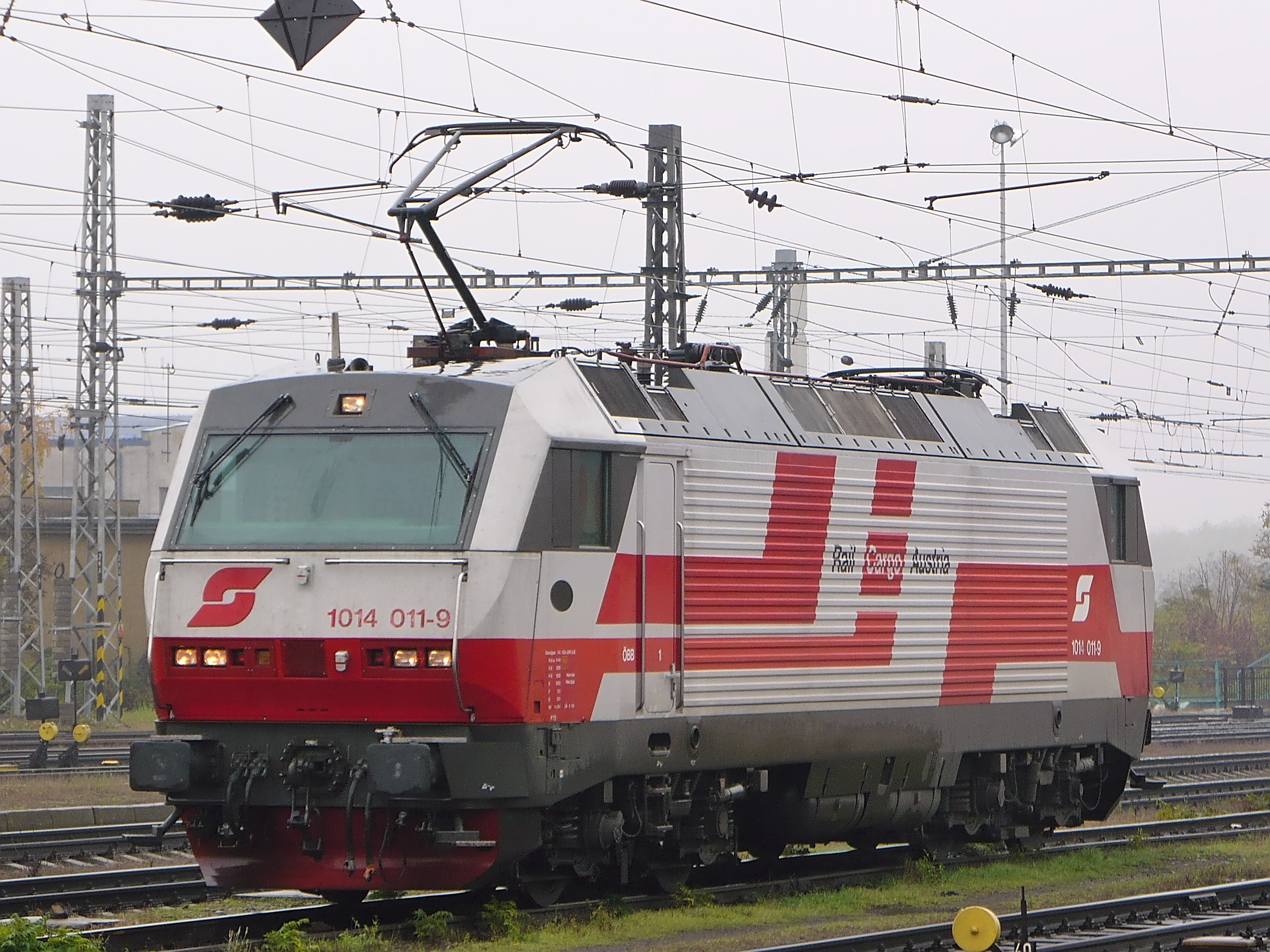
- Unit 011 in 2007
Type and origin
- Power type: Electric
- Builder: SGP Graz (mechanical); ELIN (electrical)
- Build date: 1993–1994
- Total produced: 18
Specifications
- Configuration
  - UIC: Bo-Bo
- Gauge: 1,435 mm (4 ft 8 1/2 in)
- Wheel diameter: 1,100 mm (3 ft 7 1/4 in); 1,020 mm (3 ft 4 1/4 in) (worn)
- Wheelbase
  - Bogie: 2,600 mm (8 ft 6 1/4 in)
- Length
  - Over beams: 17.50 metres
- Axle load: 1014: 18.5 tonnes (18.2 long tons; 20.4 short tons); 1114: 16.5 tonnes (16.2 long tons; 18.2 short tons)
- Loco weight: 1014: 74 tonnes (73 long tons; 82 short tons); 1114: 66 tonnes (65 long tons; 73 short tons)
- Electric system/s: 15 kV 16.7 Hz AC; 25 kV 50 Hz AC
- Current pickup: Single-arm pantograph
- Train heating: HVAC
- Loco brake: Electric, indirect air, spring-loaded
- Safety systems: Sifa, Indusi60, EVM
Performance figures
- Maximum speed: 175 km/h (109 mph)
- Power output
  - 1 hour: 3,400 kW (4,559 hp)
  - Continuous: 3,000 kW (4,023 hp)
- Tractive effort
  - Starting: 1014: 210 kN (47,209.88 lbf); 1114: 190 kN (42,713.70 lbf)
Career
- Operators: ÖBB, Zeller Transport Technik, Tanzania Railways Corporation
- Numbers: 1014 001 - 1014 018
- First run: 17 January 1994
- Withdrawn: 2001 (one unit; fire damage), 2009
- Scrapped: 2022 (Unit 001)

The ÖBB Class 1014 and 1114 were four-axle multi system electric universal locomotives, built in 1993/94 for ÖBB. The locomotives were designed to operate from Austria, to the Czech Republic, Slovakia, and Hungary.

== History ==
After the fall of the Iron Curtain, the major changes in traffic flows made themselves felt. The Austrian Federal Railways planned to acquire new and more powerful locomotives to cope with these new circumstances. Although the existing 1063 series locomotives were basically suitable for cross-border traffic with the ČD and MÁV railroad companies, they only had a maximum speed of 100 km/h, which made it impossible to use these locomotives for cross-border express trains. In the course of preparing for the planned EXPO world exhibition in 1995, ÖBB also considered using trains with coach body tilting capability within Austria; however, this project was not realized. Experience gained with the dual-current locomotives of the 1146 series was incorporated into the development of the 1014 series. In 1993 and 1994, SGP Graz (mechanical part) and ELIN (electrical part) built 18 locomotives of this series.

The first use took place on January 17, 1994, on the Northern Railway from Hohenau (headquarters of the Vienna-North train haulage office) with passenger trains to Břeclav and freight trains to Vienna and Moosbierbaum-Heiligeneich. The 1014 series locomotives were then based in Vienna South and primarily operated regional express trains to Bratislava-Petržalka, EURegio trains to Győr, regional trains to Wiener Neustadt as well as freight trains and Euro-InterCity trains on the Northern line. In their last years of operation, they were also to be found in traffic on the Semmering railway.

Since the end of 2009, the locomotives in this series have no longer been in scheduled service. They were parked and awaited sale by ÖBB.

According to the magazine Schienenverkehr aktuell/Eisenbahn Österreich 11/2016, all 17 locomotives still in service with ÖBB were taken out of service on October 1, 2016. The locomotives, which were spread across several storage locations, were brought together in Penzing and prepared for removal. On November 7, 2016, all locomotives of the 1014 series were transferred to Romania. The 1042 023 hauled the locomotive train from Vienna-Penzing to the Hungarian border station Hegyeshalom. According to ÖBB, the reason for this was the expiry of the leasing contracts on October 31, 2016.

In 2018, 16 locomotives that had been brought to Romania in 2016 were taken over by Zeller Transporttechnik (ZTT) and transferred back to Austria. In July 2019, six locomotives were back in service (1014 003, 004, 008, 010, 011 and 016), with more to follow. In the meantime, the locomotives have been parked again due to ZTT's insolvency. Some are still in Strasshof awaiting their uncertain fate.

In September 2021, four 1014 series locomotives formerly used by ZTT were shipped to Tanzania. Tanzania Railways plans to use the locomotives on the standard-gauge line from Dar es Salaam to Morogoro, with one of them reaching 160 km/h while on trial runs.

Unit 001, which was parked at the ÖBB Linz depot after its withdrawal, was sold to a scrap dealer in 2022 and subsequently broken up.

== Construction ==
=== Mechanical construction ===
The 1014 series locomotives are equipped with SGP-VT 1014 R bogies and monobloc wheelsets with ABB hollow shaft drive. Tractive power is transmitted via drawbars and push rods. The main frame, locomotive body and driver's cabs (= bridge, welded and of lightweight steel construction) are carried by the two coupled bogies. The locomotive body was taken over from the 1822 series, the only difference being that it is shorter. The side walls of the locomotives have numerous corrugations for reinforcement. The two standard driver's cabs are connected by a central aisle in the engine room. The transformer, the control system and all other auxiliary equipment and apparatus are housed there. The front sides are made of GRP on the outside, with a steel structure behind them to protect the driver in the event of a collision. The spacious driver's cabs have air conditioning and large windows that provide a good view. The roof is of lightweight aluminum construction and is divided into three removable bays - these make it easy to replace equipment in the engine room. All locomotives are equipped with Sifa and Indusi. Four locomotives intended for cross-border traffic also have MÁV train control equipment. All the locomotives were delivered painted traffic red (side surfaces and front circulation), white (driver's cabs, decorative strips and ÖBB logo) and umbra gray (window glasses, frames and bogies). Four locomotives were given a special livery. The 1014 011 was painted red/white with a large Rail Cargo Austria logo in the middle. Locomotives 1014 005, 007 and 010 were given a matching CAT livery as part of their services for the City Airport Train (CAT).

=== Electric construction ===
The roof carries two pantographs (four on the locomotives intended for border traffic to Hungary), the main switch, the roof cables and various brackets. The entire electrical part represents a further development of the 1146 series. The intermediate circuit voltage was increased to 1400 volts, which made it possible to increase the power. Power is transmitted via a hollow shaft drive. The transmission ratio of the gearbox is 1:4.17. The brake system consists of an electric brake, an indirect-acting compressed air brake as a train brake and a spring-loaded brake. The 1014 series locomotives are reversible and tandem capable.

=== 1114 series ===
Two locomotives, which were built as the independent 1114 017 and 018 series, used newly developed motor bogies. By radially adjusting the wheelsets, these enabled increased curve speeds with a maximum lateral acceleration of 1.6 m/s², and both locomotives were also around 8 tons lighter than their sister models. Both were rebuilt towards the end of 1999 and incorporated into the 1014 series with their respective numbers.

== Criticism ==
In 2014, the Austrian Court of Audit criticized the purchase of the 1014 series locomotives as a bad buy. On the one hand, they were purchased at too high a price and on the other, the locomotives were retired early and had to be written off after just 15 years instead of the planned 30. Attempts to sell the locomotives were unsuccessful for a long time and the Court of Auditors described the sales process as “unstructured and unsystematic”.
