= Dalai (Tanzanian ward) =

Ward in Chemba, Dodoma, Tanzania

Dalai Kata ya Dalai
- Ward
- Location within Tanzania
- Coordinates: 4.974550°S 35.99988°E
- Country: Tanzania
- Region: Dodoma Region
- District: Chemba District
- Ward: Dalai

Population (2016)
  - Total: 16,387
- Time zone: UTC+3 (EAT)

Dalai is an administrative ward in the Chemba District of the Dodoma Region of Tanzania. In 2016 the Tanzania National Bureau of Statistics report there were 16,387 people in the ward, from 15,078 in 2012.
