= Pahi (Tanzanian ward) =

Ward in Kondoa, Dodoma, Tanzania

Coordinates: 4°43′S 35°55′E

Pahi (Tanzanian ward) is an administrative ward in the Kondoa district of the Dodoma Region of Tanzania. According to the 2002 census, the ward has a total population of 20,152.
