= Handali =

Administrative ward in Tanzania

Coordinates: 6°20′S 36°00′E

Handali is an administrative ward in the Chamwino district of the Dodoma Region of Tanzania. According to the 2016 population estimates, the ward has a total population of 10,710.
