= Mpwapwa Mjini =

Ward in Mpwapwa, Mpwapwa, Tanzania

Mpwapwa Mjini Kata ya Mpwapwa Mjini
- Ward
- Location within Tanzania
- Coordinates: 6.34993°S 36.476089°E
- Country: Tanzania
- Region: Dodoma Region
- District: Mpwapwa district
- Ward: Mpwapwa Mjini

Area
  - Total: 135.7 km^{2} (52.4 sq mi)

Population (2016)
  - Total: 23,190
  - Density: 170.9/km^{2} (442.6/sq mi)
- Time zone: UTC+3 (EAT)

Mpwapwa Mjini is an administrative ward in the Mpwapwa district of the Dodoma Region of Tanzania. In 2016 the Tanzania National Bureau of Statistics report there were 23,190 people in the ward, from 21,337 in 2012.
