= Huzi Ward =

Administrative ward in Tanzania

Coordinates: 6°42′S 35°22′E

Huzi is an administrative ward in the Chamwino District of the Dodoma Region of Tanzania, with a total population of 8,248 according to 2016 population estimates.
