= Igandu =

- Location in Tanzania
- Coordinates: 6°20′0″S 36°0′0″E
- Country: Tanzania
- Region: Handali
- Elevation: 3,232 ft (985 m)
- Time zone: UTC+3 (East Africa Time)

Igandu is a village in central Tanzania. It is in the Ward of the same name which is part of Chamwino District

== Transport ==
Igandu has a station on the Central Railway of Tanzanian Railways. It is near the site of the disastrous Igandu train disaster. A new station on the new Standard Gauge Railway is nearing completion in early 2023.

== See also ==
- Railway stations in Tanzania
