= Msisi (Bahi) =

Ward in Bahi, Dodoma, Tanzania

Msisi Kata ya Msisi
- Ward
- Location within Tanzania
- Coordinates: 5.8666455°S 35.633118°E
- Country: Tanzania
- Region: Dodoma Region
- District: Bahi District
- Ward: Msisi

Population (2016)
  - Total: 12,876
- Time zone: UTC+3 (EAT)

Msisi is an administrative ward in the Bahi District of the Dodoma Region of Tanzania. In 2016 the Tanzania National Bureau of Statistics report there were 12,876 people in the ward, from 11,847 in 2012.
