= Bahi =

- Town
- Location in Tanzania
- Coordinates: 05°57′10″S 35°18′43″E
- Country: Tanzania
- Region: Dodoma Region
- District: Bahi District
- Time zone: GMT + 3

Bahi is town and an administrative ward in the Dodoma Region of Tanzania. It is the district capital of Bahi District.

== Transport ==
The paved trunk road T3 from Morogoro to the Rwandan border passes through the town.

The central railway of Tanzania passes through the town as well and there is a train station in Bahi.

== See also ==
- Mohamed Bahi (born 1983/1984), American-Algerian former Chief Liaison of New York City Mayor Eric Adams to the Muslim community.
