= Segala, Tanzania =

Administrative ward in Tanzania

Coordinates: 5°35′S 36°09′E

Segala is an administrative ward in the Chamwino district of the Dodoma Region of Tanzania. According to ]2016 population estimates, the ward has a total population of 13,902.
