= Makutopora =

^{About the ward in Dodoma with a similar name see Makutupora}

Makutopora is a ward of Manyoni District in Singida Region, Tanzania with the postal code 43405. According to the census of 2012 the ward had 6,635 inhabitants.

At Makutopora a new passenger station on the Tanzania Standard Gauge Railway is nearly complete in early 2023 and a separate freight station was under construction.
