= Chikola (Dodoma Rural ward) =

Ward in Dodoma Region, Tanzania

Chikola Kata ya Chikola
- Ward
- Location within Tanzania
- Coordinates: 6.049551°S 34.829513°E
- Country: Tanzania
- Region: Dodoma Region
- District: Bahi District

Population (2016)
  - Total: 14,855
- Time zone: UTC+3 (EAT)

Chikola is an administrative ward in the Bahi District of the Dodoma Region of Tanzania. In 2016 the Tanzania National Bureau of Statistics report there were 14,855 people in the ward, from 13,668 in 2012.
