= Membe, Tanzania =

Ward in Chamwino, Dodoma, Tanzania

Membe Kata ya Membe
- Ward
- Location within Tanzania
- Coordinates: 10.1485759°S 39.4099747°E
- Country: Tanzania
- Region: Dodoma Region
- District: Chamwino District
- Ward: Membe

Population (2016)
  - Total: 9,484
- Time zone: UTC+3 (EAT)

Membe is an administrative ward in the Chamwino District of the Dodoma Region of Tanzania. In 2016 the Tanzania National Bureau of Statistics reported there were 9,484 people in the ward.
