= Kondoa District =

- District
- Kondoa District of Dodoma Region.
- Coordinates: 04°54′23″S 35°46′47″E
- Country: Tanzania
- Region: Dodoma Region

Area
  - Total: 4,373 km^{2} (1,688 sq mi)

Population (2022 census)
  - Total: 244,854
  - Density: 55.99/km^{2} (145.0/sq mi)

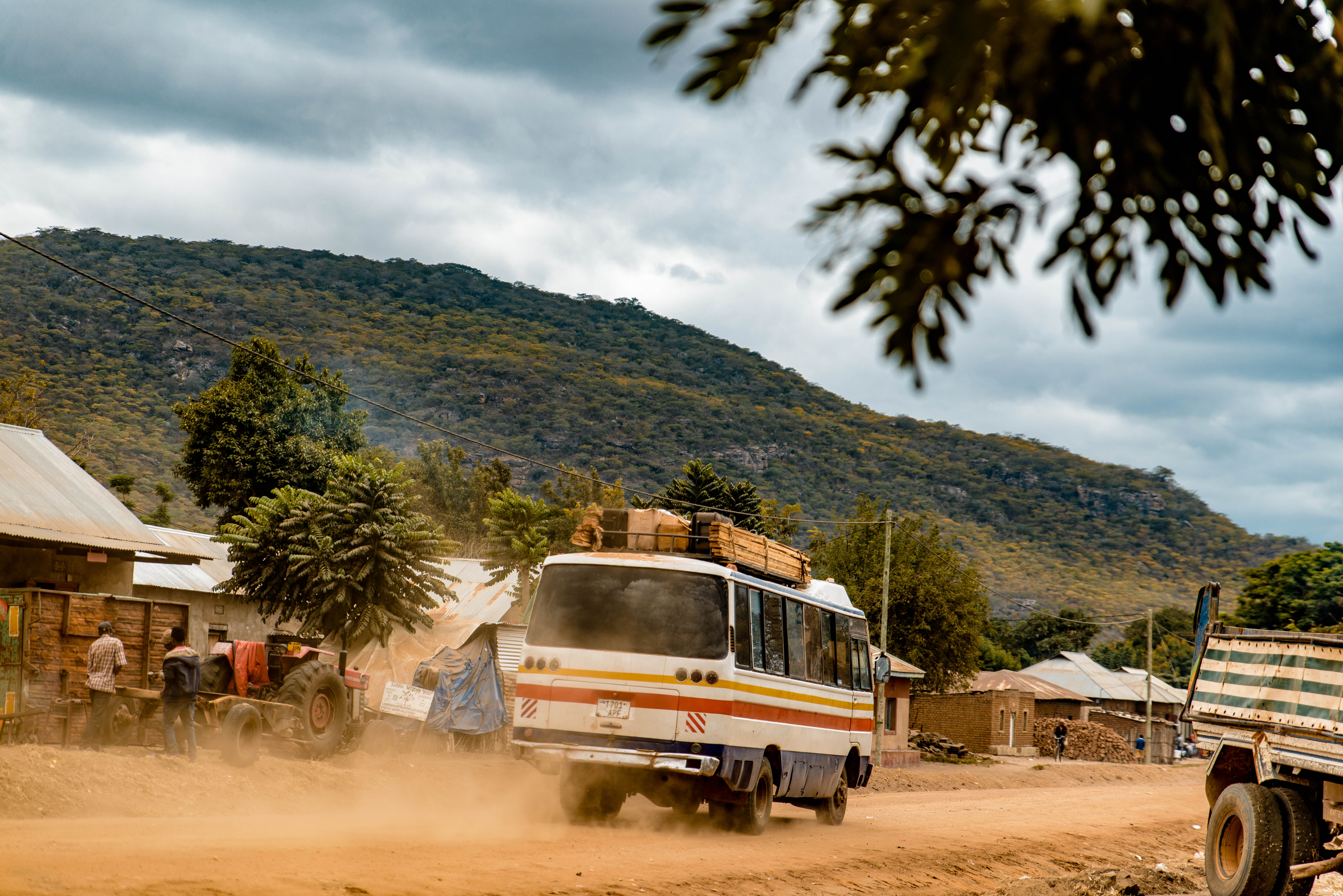
A bus on dust road.

Kondoa District is one of the seven districts of the Dodoma Region of Tanzania. It is bordered to the north by Manyara Region, and to the south by Chemba District. Its district capital is the town of Kondoa.

According to the 2012 Tanzania National Census, the population of Kondoa District was 269,704. As of 2002, the population of the Kondoa District was 429,824. The population of the district declined from 2002 to 2012, because Chemba District was split off. In 2022 the population was 244,854.

The Kondoa Irangi Rock Paintings, which were inscribed as a UNESCO World Heritage Site in 2006, are found in this district.

== Transport ==
Trunk road T5 from Dodoma to Babati passes through the district.

== Administrative subdivisions ==
As of 2012, Kondoa District was administratively divided into 28 wards.

=== Wards ===
- Bereko
- Bolisa
- Bumbuta
- Busi
- Changaa
- Chemchem
- Haubi
- Hondo mairo
- Itaswi
- Itololo
- Kalamba
- Kikilo
- Kikore
- Kilimani
- Kingale
- Kinyasi
- Kisese
- Kolo
- Kondoa mjini
- Kwadelo
- Masange
- Mnenia
- Pahi
- Salanka
- Serya
- Soera
- Suruke
- Thawi
