= Gulwe =

- Location in Tanzania
- Coordinates: 6°27′S 36°25′E
- Country: Tanzania
- Region: Dodoma Region
- Time zone: UTC+3 (East Africa Time)
- Climate: BSh

Gulwe is a town in Tanzania.

== Transport ==
Gulwe is a station on the Central Railway of Tanzanian Railways. A new Standard Gauge Railway with a passenger station and a separate freight station are being built. Both were near to completion in early 2023. It is the railhead for Mpwapwa.

== See also ==
- Railway stations in Tanzania
