= Arapaoa River =

Coordinates: 36°14′S 174°18′E

Location
- Country: New Zealand

Physical characteristics
- Mouth
  - location: Kaipara Harbour
- Length: 17 km (11 mi)

The Arapaoa River is a northeastern arm of the Kaipara Harbour in Northland, New Zealand. Officially designated as a river, it is some 17 kilometres (11 mi) long and an average of 3 kilometres (2 mi) wide.

== See also ==
- List of rivers of New Zealand
