= Sandawe people =

Ethnic group from Dodoma Region, Tanzania

Sandawe
- Traditional area of the Sandawe

Total population
- 60,000 (2013)

Regions with significant populations
- Tanzania (Chemba District, Dodoma Region)

Languages
- Sandawe

Religion
- Animism, Islam

Related ethnic groups
- Hadza people, perhaps Khoisan

The Sandawe are an indigenous ethnic group of Southeast Africa, based in the Chemba District Kwamtoro ward of Dodoma Region in central Tanzania. In 2000, the Sandawe population was estimated to be 40,000.

The Sandawe language is a tonal language that uses click consonants, as do the Khoe languages of southern Africa.

== History ==
=== Origins ===
There has been debate on whether the Sandawe represent a link to the Khoisan hunter-gatherers of Southern Africa, though recent research suggests Khoisan are older and mostly unrelated to Sandawe.

The Sandawe today are considered descendants of an original Bushmen-like people, unlike their modern neighbours, the Gogo. They live in the geographic centre of old German East Africa, the 'Street of Caravans' crossing their southern edge.

The Sandawe language may share a common ancestor with the Khoe languages of southern Africa. It has clicks and is unrelated to the neighbouring Bantu languages, though it has been lightly influenced by neighbouring Cushitic languages.

The Sandawe have long been considered expert survivalists during times of food shortages as a result of having a strong hunting and gathering tradition. By the time of the expeditions of Charles Stokes and Emin Pasha (late 1880s to early 1890s) they had also become herders and agriculturalists, but still tended to be grouped with the Gogo people. It was not until the travels of Lt. Tom von Prince in 1895 that the Sandawe were finally recognised by Europeans as a separate people maintaining their independence. Despite their technologically simple culture, European colonists considered them politically and militarily significant at least until the turn of the 20th century.

The Sandawe adopted agriculture from their Bantu neighbours, probably the Gogo, and scattered their homesteads wherever a suitable piece of land was found for their staple crops of millet, sorghum and eventually, maize. They were uncomfortable with and had no use for denser village life, and remained a basically stateless people, showing little interest in 'empire-building'. The Sandawe did, however, have a tradition of mutual cooperation in such things as hoeing and threshing, homebuilding and organising informal parties to hunt pigs and elephants. They built their very temporary huts away from water holes, and then went hunting in the surrounding country. They also likely did not practice polygamy until after adopting agriculture.

=== Colonial times ===
During the mid-19th century, when Germany began to colonise sub-Saharan Africa, some Sandawe clans used their prestige as rainmakers to lay claim to chiefly status, but were never really accepted as such. Others defied European rule and the mass migrations of arriving colonists around them. The Germans were told that a man named Mtoro wielded some authority. He was officially made headman or leader of the recently established Nyamwezi colony.

The Sandawe so hated Mtoro and the Nyamwezi settlers that they threw them out in 1902, seizing their cattle. Lieutenant Kohlerman was called to keep the peace and within three days killed 800 Sandawe men, reportedly without suffering a casualty, while a second expedition then came and captured 1,100 cattle. The district commander reported 'progress':

The rock-strewn land of Usandawe...is inhabited by a still thoroughly warlike, predatory and unexplored mountain people whose members do not recognise German rule, live far apart and tolerate no headmen or superiors, and have hereto rid themselves in drastic fashion of those experimentally installed by the station. We now have the situation well in hand.

Encouraged, the German colony withdrew its military. But the Sandawe attacked as the soldiers left, announcing a willingness to confront a new expedition, and began harassing the Nyamwezi. In the end, the Sandawe were 'pacified', and 22 headmen were appointed chiefs, mainly from the traditional rainmaking clans. One of the headmen said, "If any one defies my order, I will appeal to the European Sergeant Linke. He is one who punishes with fetters and the whip....Therefore, my people see that you live in peace."

With the end of colonialism, however, the institution of chiefdom quickly crumbled and disappeared. In telling their stories, the Sandawe identify with small animals that use their cunning and intelligence to outwit their dangerous and more powerful enemies. As Tom von Prince understood it in his book Gegen Araber und Wahehe, "the deathly fear that must have existed to drive these people thousands of kilometers from their homes south of the equator, into the middle of countless strange tribes to find peace, can only be guessed at."

== Culture ==
The Sandawe practice an insular and deeply spiritual culture with an emphasis on animism. Caves in the hills were believed to harbour spirits and were respected and even feared. So as not to disturb these spirits, the caves were avoided, no animals were herded there and no wood cut or twigs broken. Once a year the Sandawe would go to the caves to perform rituals of sacrifice in order to make sure the spirits would not be spiteful and interfere with the community's general well-being. People would go to the caves in the hills as a group shouting prayers to the spirits, assuring them that no one had come to disturb them, but had come to pay their respects. These prayers were shouted as loudly as possible, to make sure that the spirits could hear no matter where they were. The Sandawe beliefs also centred on a veneration of the moon, the stars, the seasons and the mantis insect. The moon was seen as a symbol of life and fertility; cool and beneficial, it brought rain and controlled the cycle of fertility in women. The mantis was divine messenger with a special reason for appearing and a medium was usually consulted to find the explanation.

There was a god, Warongwe, who was so abstract, distant and unrelated to the well-being of normal life that it was rarely prayed to or given sacrifices. As in almost all African areas, religion consisted of a long line of ancestors and a strongly-knit extended family system that mediated between living beings and a very remote all-powerful God.

The Sandawe were and remain an outgoing people, fond of singing, dancing, making music and drinking beer and have an enormous store of songs. All ceremonials and rituals differed from one another, such as those of harvest and courtship, as did those of the curing rituals with their trances, the circumcision festivals and simba possession dances, in which dancers imitated lions in order to combat witchcraft. The Sandawe still retain a strong oral tradition, loving to recount stories, which embody the collective wisdom of the group.

== See also ==
- Khoisan
- Hadza people
- Bantu peoples
- History of Tanzania
