= Manda (Tanzanian ward) =

Ward in Ludewa, Njombe, Tanzania

Manda Kata ya Manda
- Ward
- Location within Tanzania
- Coordinates: 10.45327048°S 34.59223503°E
- Country: Tanzania
- Region: Njombe Region
- District: Ludewa District
- Ward: Manda

Population (2016)
  - Total: 4,443
- Time zone: UTC+3 (EAT)

Manda is an administrative ward in Ludewa District in the Njombe Region of Tanzania. In 2016 the Tanzania National Bureau of Statistics report there were 4,443 people in the ward, from 4,304 in 2012.

Manda is a small town along Lake Nyasa (Nyasa means Lake), in Ludewa District. The small town of Manda was known as Wiedhafen during the time of German East Africa. Germans promoted commerce and economic growth. Lake Nyasa in Tanzania also known as Lake Malawi in Malawi, and Lago Niassa in Mozambique is one of the truly wonderful places in the world.

The lake itself is the 5th largest in the world by volume, the second largest in Tanzania and Africa, and has been in existence for millions of years (estimates range from about 8mya). In just one lake it contains over a thousand species of fishes. Lake Nyasa is between 560 and 580 kilometres (350 and 360 miles) long, and about 75 kilometres (47 miles) wide at its widest point. The lake is 706 m (2,316 ft) at its deepest point, located in a major depression in the north-central part. The largest river flowing into it is the Ruhuhu River in Manda, and there is an outlet at its southern end, the Shire River, a tributary that flows into the very large Zambezi River in Mozambique.

Most of the species in the lake belong to the family Cichlidae, though lungfish, elephant-noses, mastacemblid eels and catfish are also present.Many Cichlids diplays bright colouration and varied behaviours.The lake’s high species diversity has led to wide range of ecological specialization: some spieses scrape aalge from rocks,other filter sand, feed on snails, inhabit in empty snail shells,consume plants,pray other fishes or use mimicary of dead fish to capture prey. Majourity are maternal mouthbrooders, with female carrying eggs & young in mouths. The lake has warm,clear water sandy shores & rocky areas and bordered by plains & livingstone mountains. Manda has a history that includes naval engagement of German & British forces.
