= Chemba District, Dodoma =

Chemba District
- District
- Chemba District of Dodoma Region.
- Coordinates: 05°14′34″S 35°53′24″E
- Country: Tanzania
- Region: Dodoma Region

Population (2012)
  - Total: 235,711

Chemba District is one of the seven districts of the Dodoma Region of Tanzania. It was formed after 2010, when it was split off from Kondoa District. Chemba District is bordered to the north by Kondoa District, to the east by Manyara Region, to the south by Chamwino District and Bahi District, and to the west by Singida Region. Its administrative seat is the town of Chemba.

According to the 2012 Tanzania National Census, the population of Chemba District was 235,711.

== Transport ==
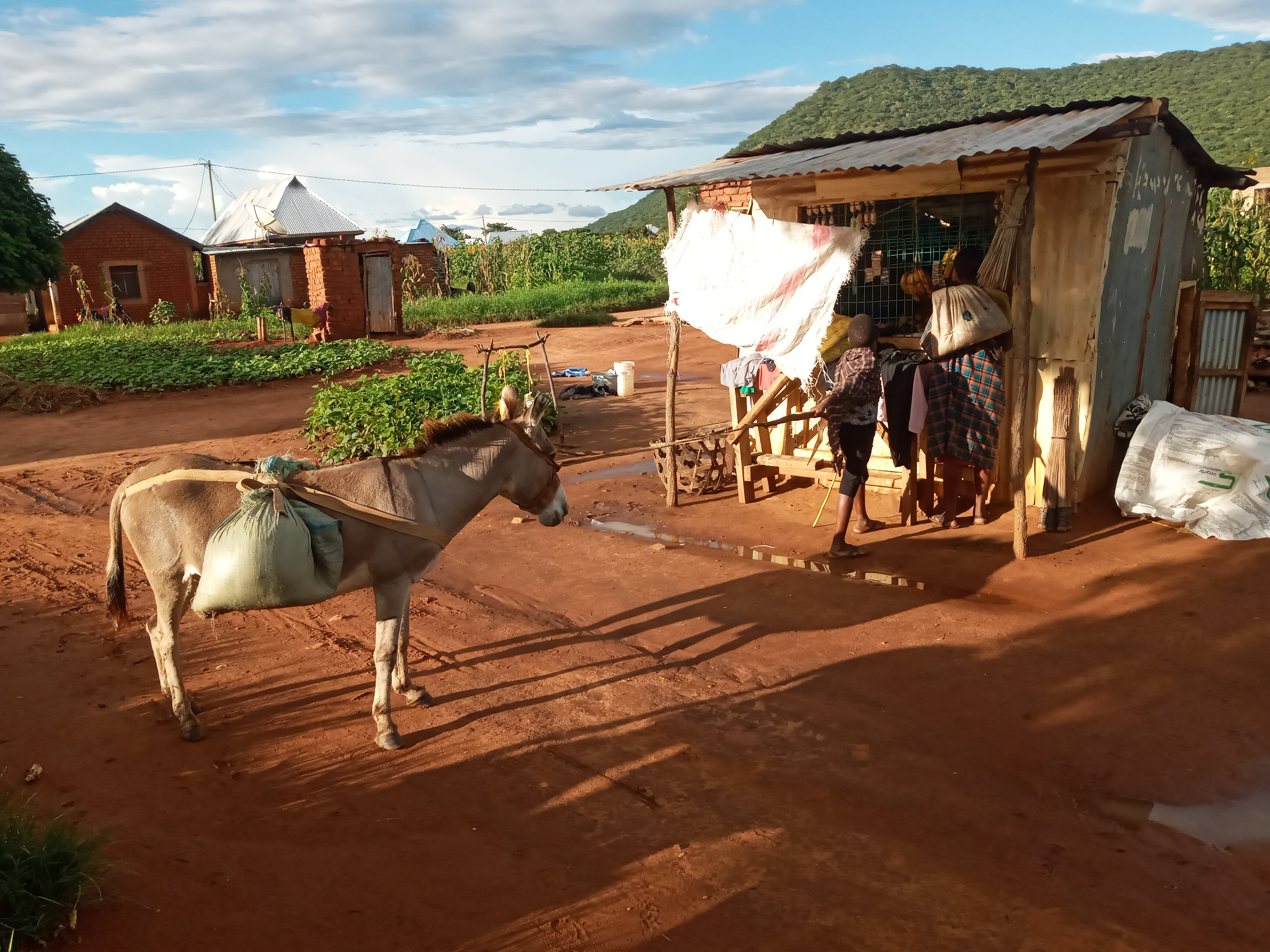
Donkey as means of transport in Chemba District

Trunk road T5 from Dodoma to Babati passes through the district.

== Administrative subdivisions ==
As of 2012, Chemba District was administratively divided into 20 wards.

=== Wards ===
- Chandama
- Chemba
- Churuku
- Dalai
- Farkwa
- Goima
- Gwandi
- Jangalo
- Kimaha
- Kwamtoro
- Lalta
- Makorongo
- Mondo
- Mpendo
- Mrijo
- Msaada
- Ovada
- Paranga
- Sanzawa
- Songoro
