= Bahi District =

District in Dodoma Region, Tanzania

- District
- Bahi District of Dodoma Region.
- Coordinates: 05°57′10″S 35°18′43″E
- Country: Tanzania
- Region: Dodoma Region

Area
  - Total: 5,630 km^{2} (2,170 sq mi)

Population (2022)
  - Total: 322,526
  - Density: 57.3/km^{2} (148/sq mi)

Bahi District is one of the seven districts of the Dodoma Region of Tanzania. Bahi District is bordered to the north by Chemba District, to the east by Dodoma District and Chamwino District, and to the west by Singida Region. Its administrative seat is the town of Bahi.

According to the 2012 Tanzania National Census, the population of Bahi District was 221,645. According to the 2022 census, the population of the district had grown to 322,526.

== Transport ==
Paved trunk road T3 from Morogoro to the Rwandan border passes through the district.

The central railway of Tanzania passes through Bahi District as well and there is a train station in Bahi town. The new Standard Gauge Railway has a station at Bahi under construction in early 2023.

== Administrative subdivisions ==
Administratively, the district is divided into four divisions namely, Mundemu, Chipanga, Bahi and Mwitikira.

As of 2017, Bahi District is further divided into 22 wards.

Administrative Units of Bahi District
Divisions	Wards	Villages
Mundemu	6	18
Chipanga	6	18
Bahi	6	14
Mwitikira	4	9
Total	22	59

=== Wards ===
- Babayu
- Bahi
- Chali
- Chibelela
- Chikola
- Chifutuka
- Chipanga
- Ibihwa
- Ibugule
- Ilindi
- Kigwe
- Lamaiti
- Makanda
- Mpalanga
- Mpamantwa
- Mpinga
- Msisi
- Mtitaa
- Mundemu
- Mwitikira
- Nondwa
- Zanka
