= Chamwino =

Ward in Dodoma, Tanzania

Chamwino Kata ya Chamwino
- Ward
- Location within Tanzania
- Coordinates: 6.0983959°S 36.042333°E
- Country: Tanzania
- Region: Dodoma Region
- District: Dodoma Urban
- Ward: Chamwino

Government
  - MP: Antony Mavunde
  - Mayor: Professor Davis G. Mwamfupe
  - Councilor: Salum Salu Ngede

Population (2016)
  - Total: 20,840
- Time zone: UTC+3 (EAT)

Chamwino is an administrative ward in the Dodoma Urban district of the Dodoma Region of Tanzania. In 2016 the Tanzania National Bureau of Statistics report there were 20,840 people in the ward, from 19,175 in 2012.
