= Dodoma Region =

Region of Tanzania

Dodoma Region Mkoa wa Dodoma (Swahili)
- Region
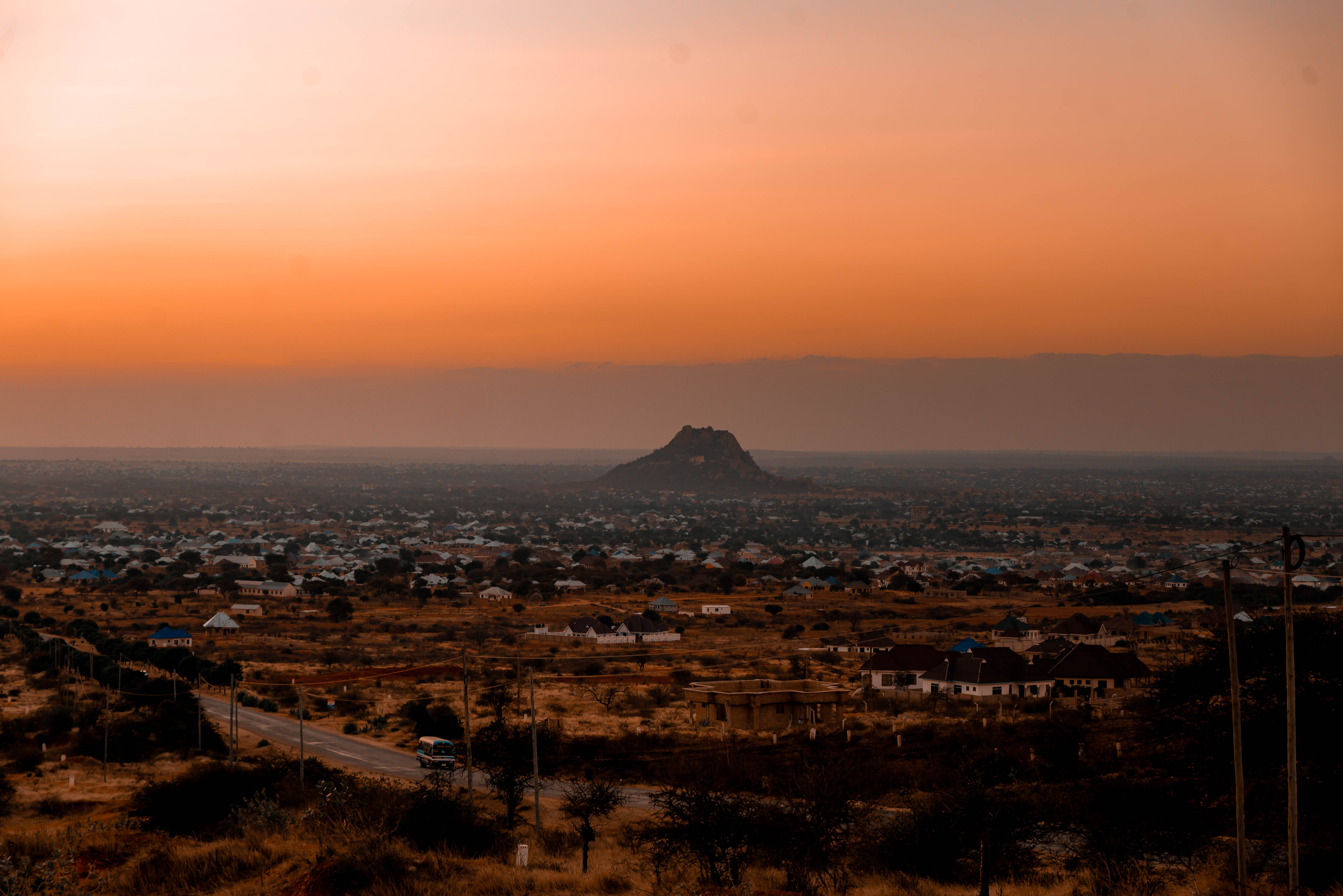
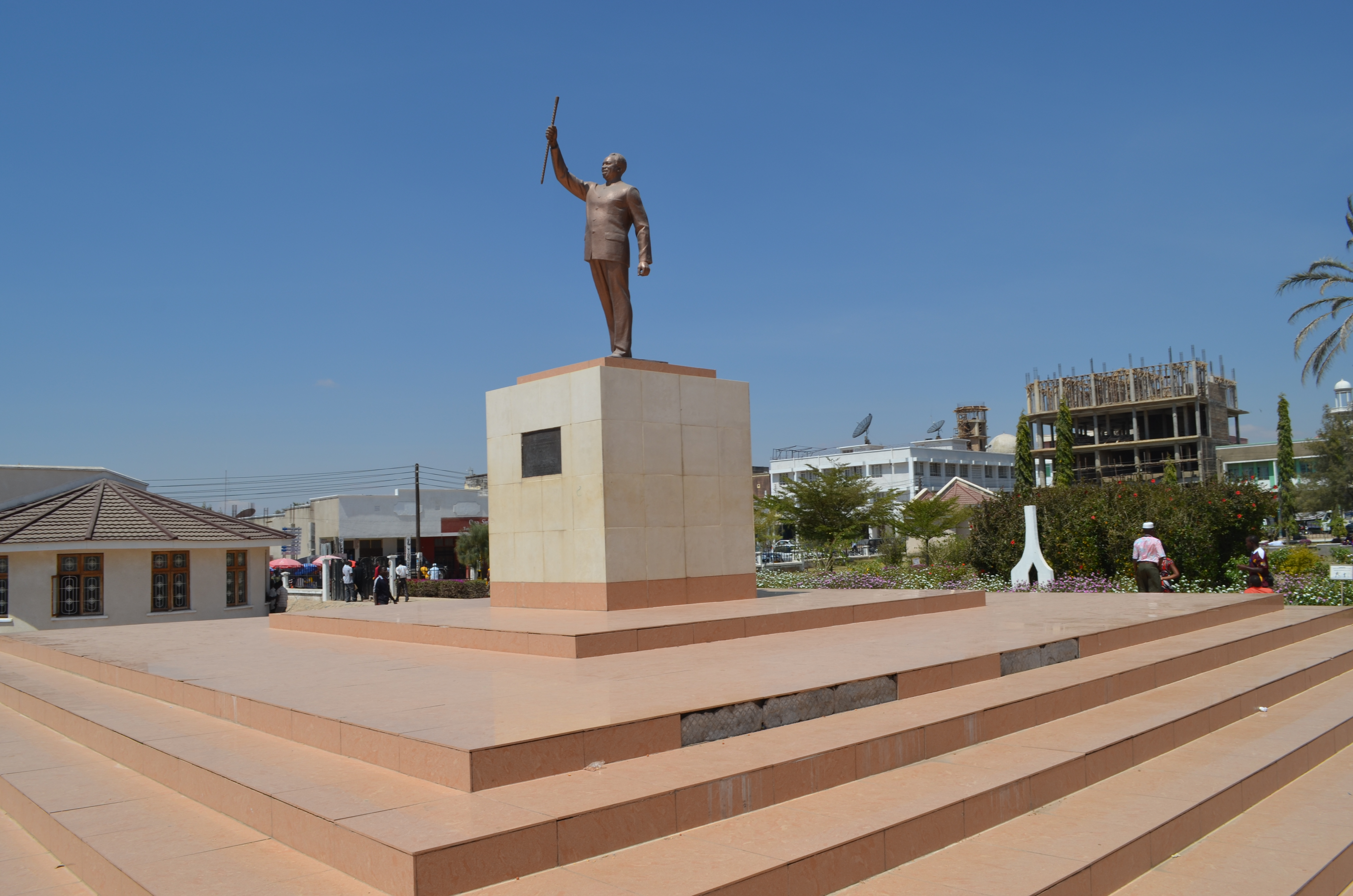
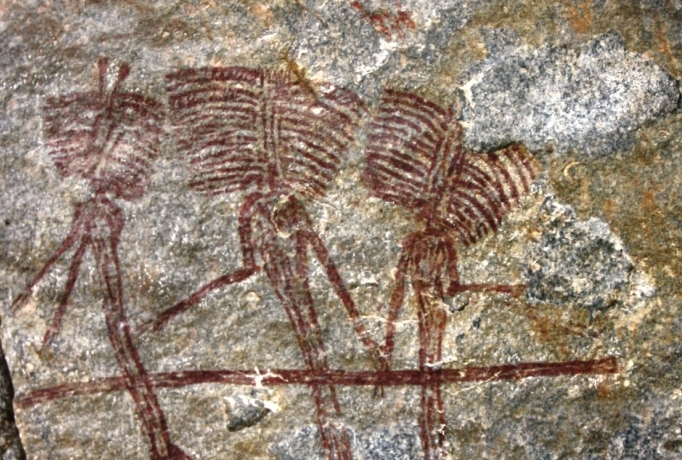
- From top to bottom: Dodoma cityscape; statue of Julius Nyerere in Dodoma; Kondoa Rock-Art Sites
- Nicknames: The capital region, The wine region
- Location in Tanzania
- Coordinates: 6°34′25.68″S 36°15′47.16″E
- Country: Tanzania
- Zone: Central
- Named for: Dodoma
- Capital: Dodoma
- Districts: List: Dodoma District; Bahi District; Chamwino District; Chemba District; Kondoa District; Kongwa District; Mpwapwa District

Government
  - Regional Commissioner: Rosemary Staki Senyamule

Area
  - Total: 41,311 km^{2} (15,950 sq mi)
  - Rank: 8th of 31
- Highest elevation (Lugunga): 2,352 m (7,717 ft)

Population (2022)
  - Total: 3,085,625
  - Rank: 7th of 31
  - Density: 74.693/km^{2} (193.45/sq mi)
- Demonym: Dodoman

Ethnic groups
  - Settler: Swahili
  - Native: Gogo, Rangi, Sandawe & Burungi
- Time zone: UTC+3 (EAT)
- Postcode: 41xxx
- Area code: 026
- ISO 3166 code: TZ-03
- HDI (2021): 0.497 low · 23rd of 25
- Website: Official website
- Symbols of Tanzania
- Bird: Rubeho akalat
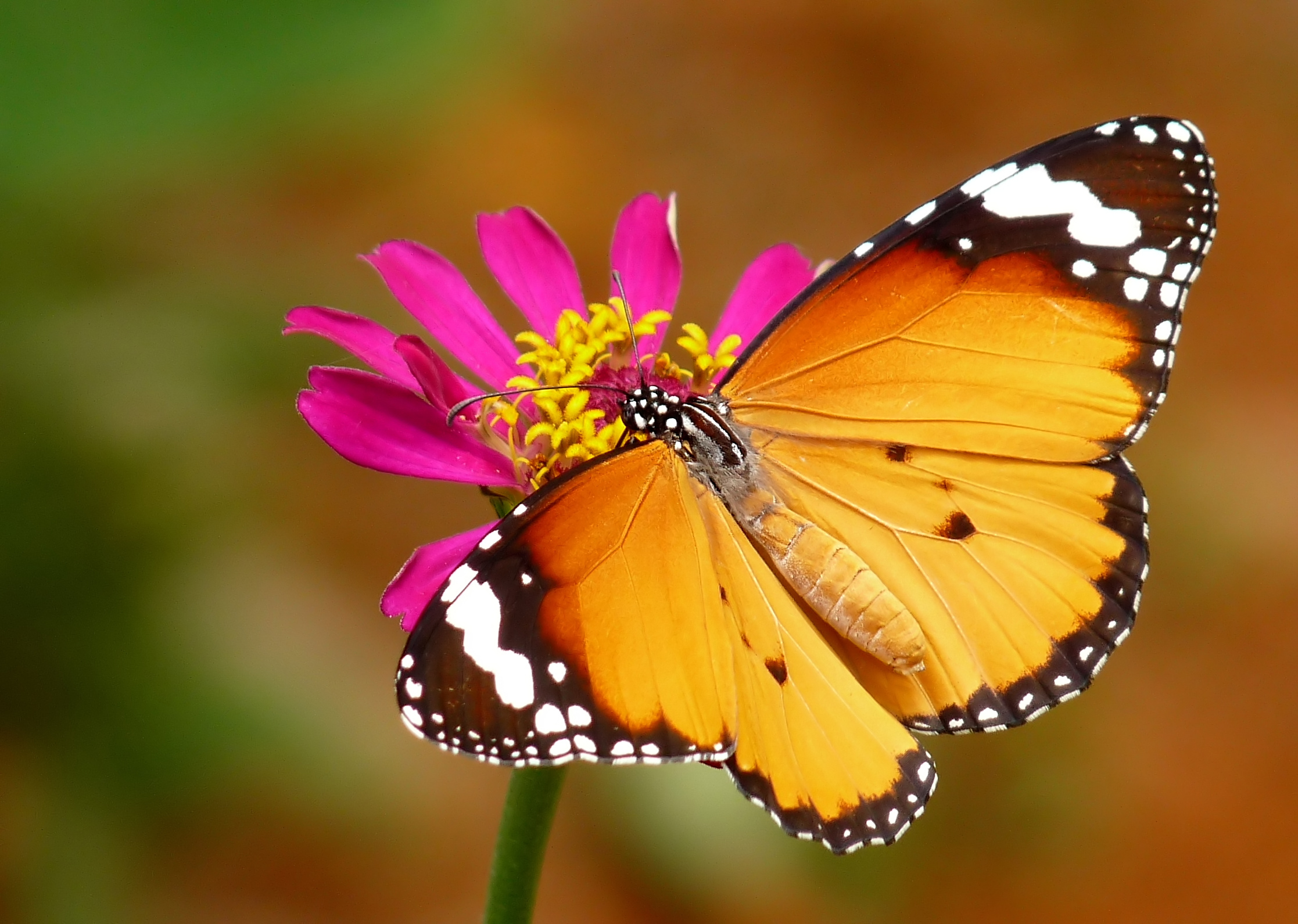
- Butterfly: Danaus chrysippus

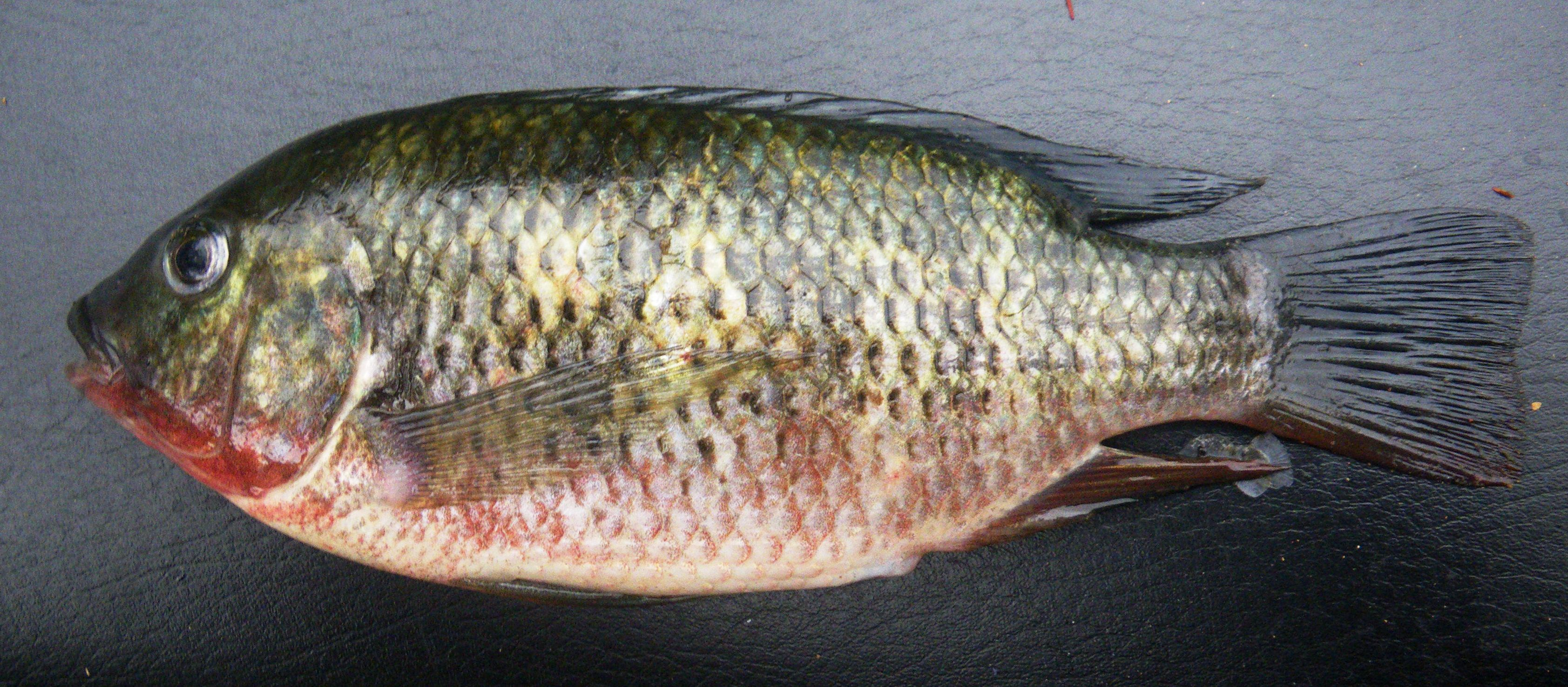
- Fish: Redbreast tilapia

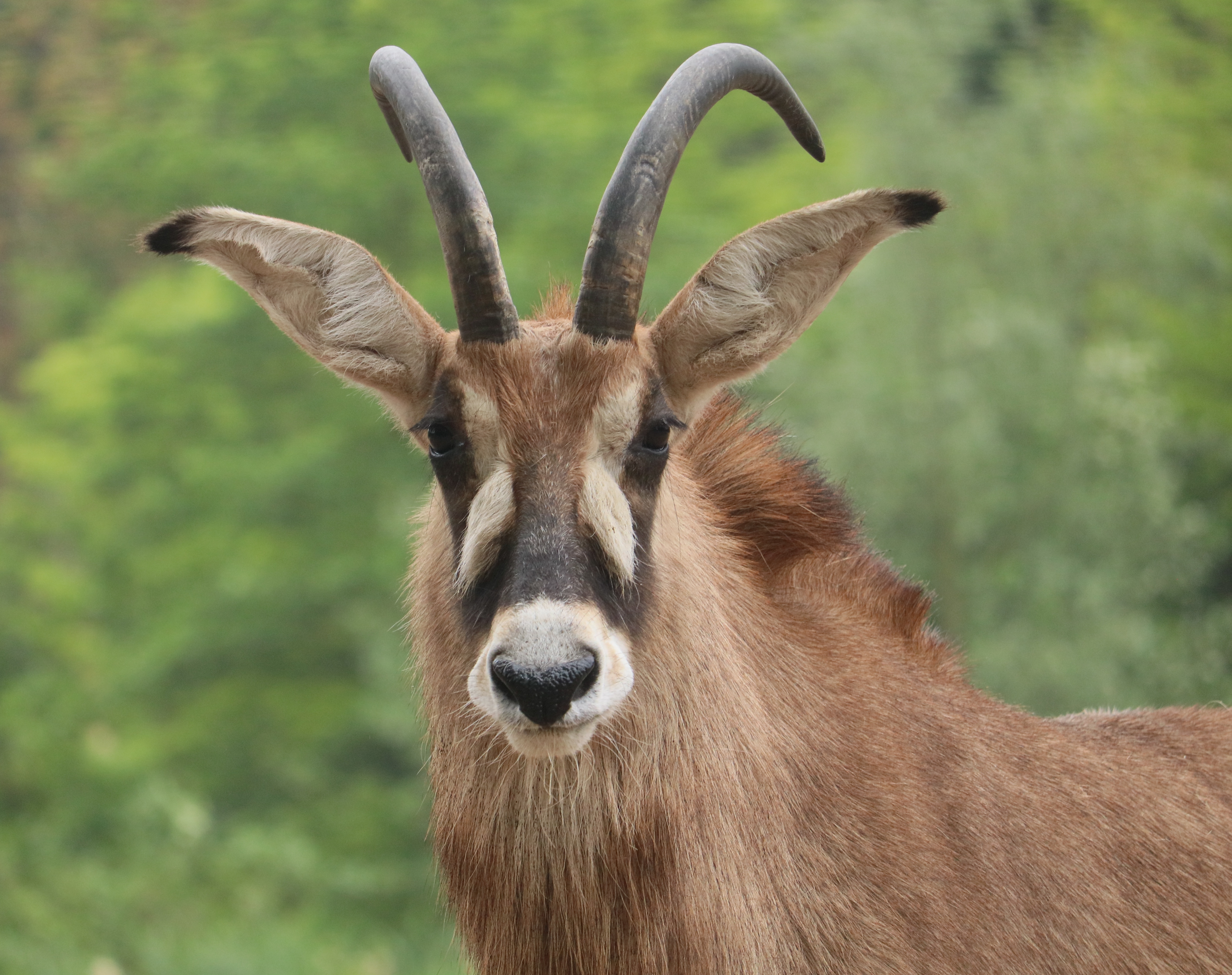
- Mammal: Roan Antelope

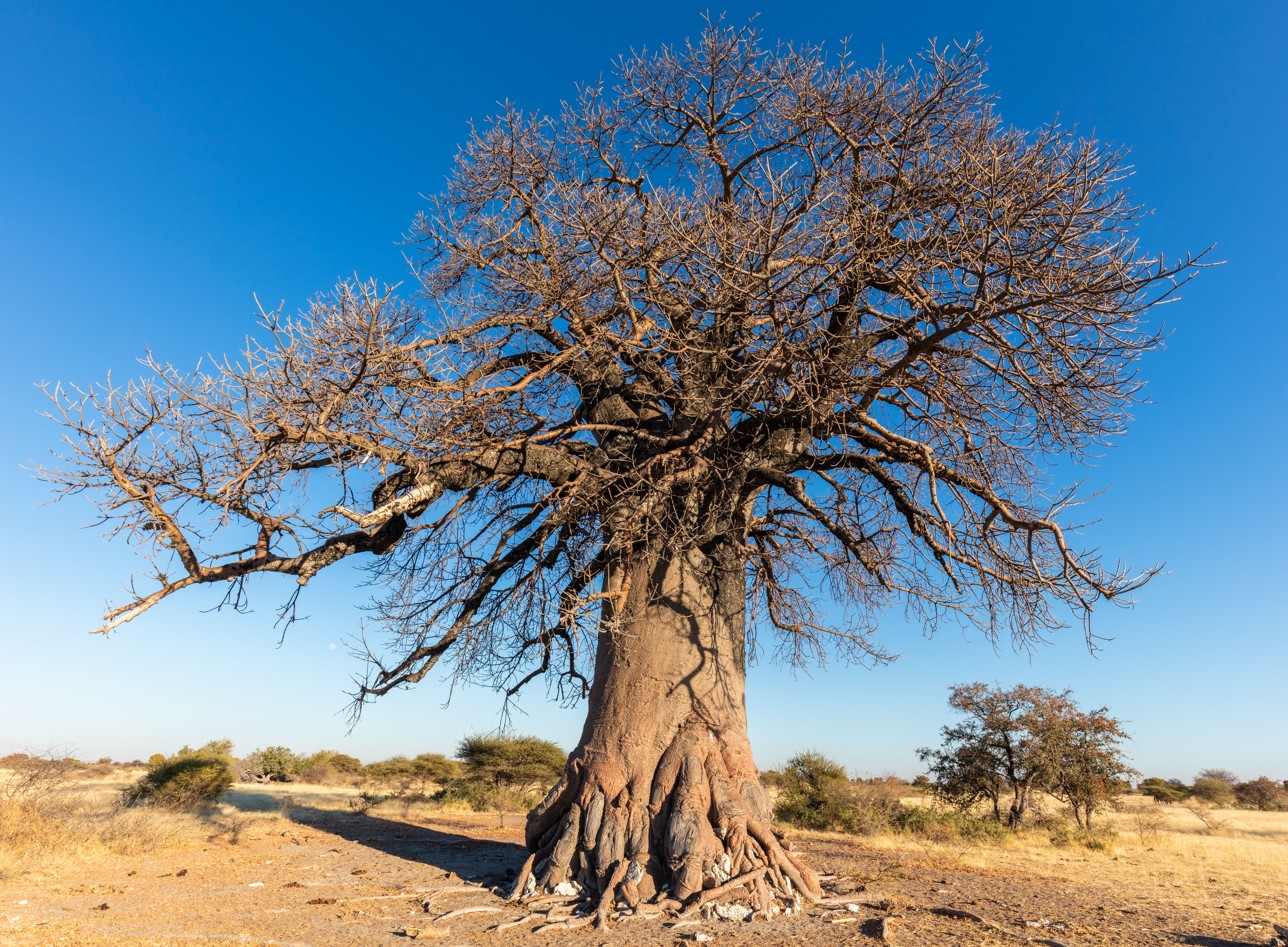
- Tree: Baobab

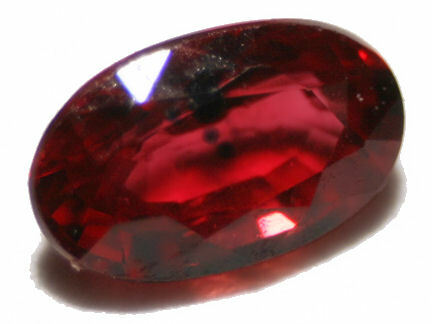
- Mineral: Ruby

Dodoma Region (Mkoa wa Dodoma in Swahili) is one of Tanzania's 31 administrative regions. The regional capital is the city of Dodoma, which is also the capital of Tanzania. Dodoma region is located in central Tanzania, bordered by Singida region to the west, Manyara region to the north, Iringa region to the south, and Morogoro region to the east. Dodoma hosts the National Assembly of Tanzania or Bunge. Dodoma region also hosts one of the largest universities in Tanzania, the University of Dodoma. The region is the home of the Tanzanian wine industry, which is the second largest wine industry on the continent after South Africa. According to the 2022 national census, the region had a population of 3,085,625; in the 2012 national census, the population was 2,083,588.

== History ==
Dodoma's name derives from the Gogo word Idodomya, the place where an elephant sunk into the mud.

The city of Dodoma, from which the region gets its name, is the largest city and capital of the region. It began as a small Gogo village in the early 19th century, consisting of several traditional tembe houses. The city was formally established in 1907 by German colonists during construction of the Tanzanian central railway. The region has a long history of famine and economic difficulties. Along with Kondoa and Singida it was struck hard by the famine of the 1910s. One report by a British officer in Dodoma in December 1916 reported that "the whole district has been ransacked for cattle". The Germans had killed 26,000 animals, and the British, nearly 5,700. Problems continued throughout 1917, and in November 1917 drought turned it into a crisis. Some 30,000 people died; about 1 in 5 of the population of the district. Thousands of people emigrated, and others sold starving cattle for just a shilling at the market in Dodoma. Smallpox was prevalent, and the Spanish flu epidemic killed an estimated 50,000–80,000 in Tanganyika between 1918 and 1920.

When the British took over the country, they favoured Dar es Salaam and Arusha, and Dodoma began to decline in importance. It declined further in the 1960s when the Tanzam Highway was built by the Chinese, connecting Dar es Salaam to Morogoro and Iringa. On 9 December 1961, Tanganyika won independence from Britain, and Dodoma remained the capital of the central province. In 1963, the provinces of the new nation were divided into smaller administrative units and were renamed regions, and the Dodoma region was established. In 1973, the Tanzanian government announced that the administrative capital would be moved from Dar es Salaam to a more central location to better serve the needs of the people. Dodoma was selected for this purpose, as it was an already established town at a major crossroads with an agreeable climate and scope for development. The same year, the Tanzanian government launched a national soil conservation programme, known as the Dodoma soil conservation programme, to improve soil fertility and productivity in the worst affected areas of the region.

== Geography ==
Dodoma is the 8th largest region by area after Manyara region. Dodoma region, which is primarily semi-arid, covers an area of 41,311 square kilometres (15,950 mi^{2}), making it slightly larger than Switzerland (41,284 square kilometres (15,940 mi^{2})). The Dodoma region lies in the heart of Tanzania in the eastern-central part of the country, the main city being about 300 miles (480 km) from the coast. The region is bordered by the Manyara region to the north, the Tanga region to the north east, the Singida region to the west, the Iringa region to the south, and the Morogoro region to the east and southeast.

The Wami river sub-basin "extends from the semi-arid Dodoma Region to the humid inland swamps in the Morogoro region to Saadani village in the coastal Bagamoyo district". The Kikuyu River flows through the region, passing near the city of Dodoma. Protected areas include the Swaga Swaga game reserve. The region produces beans, seeds, grain, peanuts, coffee, tea, and tobacco. Cattle are also raised and marketed. A total of 220,989 hectares, or 5.44 percent of the region's 4,131,100 hectares of land, are covered by natural forest reserves. The majority of these natural forest reserves are in the Chamwino (100,391 hectares), Kondoa (37,199 hectares), Bahi (28,058 hectares), Mpwapwa (22,958 hectares), Kongwa (11,883 hectares), and Chemba regions (20,500 hectares).

=== Climate ===
Due to irregular and low rainfall, the Dodoma region is primarily semi-arid. Rainfall in the region usually falls between November/December and April/May in a single rainy season. Often, storms bring strong rains that cause flash floods. The annual total precipitation ranges from 500 to 800 mm. Although the temperature in the area varies depending on elevation, it typically ranges from around 15 °C in July to 30 °C in October. There can be significant temperature changes between day and night, with afternoons reaching temperatures of up to 35 °C and nights reaching temperatures of around 10 °C.

== Economy ==
In terms of socio-economic statistics, the Dodoma region is ranked reasonably well. The region's gross domestic product (GDP) was Tsh 2,635,574 million in 2015, and GDP per capita was Tsh 1,188,343 according to the 2017 Tanzania human development report (THDR). Dodoma received a human development index1 (HDI) score of 0.479, placing it 17th out of 26 regions in mainland Tanzania. Tanzania's mainland has an average HDI score of 0.614. The life expectancy in Dodoma was 64.4 years; longer than average for the Tanzanian mainland (61.7 years).

=== Agriculture ===
The agriculture industry dominates the economy of the Dodoma region, with subsistence farming as well as commercial farming. A total of 376,924 out of 450,305 private households in the area (84 percent) were involved in agriculture according to the 2012 population and housing census. These homes were primarily located in Chamwino district council (68,162 households). The percentage of households engaged in agriculture in districts within the Dodoma region ranged up to 90% in Kondoa and Mpwapwa, and 93 percent in Bahi and Chemba district councils, while in Dodoma city 54% of households were employed in agriculture.

The central plateau zone, where the Dodoma region lies, is well known for producing fruits like grapes, mango, papaya, guava, baobab, tamarind, and dates. The main cash crop grown by farmers among the fruits is grapes. Additionally, many farmers in Dodoma city and adjacent districts rely heavily on the production of grapes for their livelihood. Dodoma district produces over 70% of the grapes in the area, with 30% of the output from Chamwino and Bahi. Jam, juice, jelly, wine, grape seed extracts, raisins, vinegar, and grapeseed oil are all products made from grapes. Smallholder farmers who grow grapes on their own farms are the main producers of grapes in Dodoma.

Maize, sorghum, millet, rice, pulses (mostly pigeon peas), cassava, potatoes, bananas, and plantains are some of the principal food crops grown in Dodoma. The semi-arid climate favors the production of paddy, sorghum, millet, and other oil-seed crops. The main food crops grown in the area are maize and sorghum, primarily in the districts of Kongwa, Chemba, Kondoa, Mpwapwa, and Chamwino. In terms of maize production, Kongwa is the top district, followed by Kondoa and Chemba. Crops like cassava and potatoes are only grown in small amounts.

The second most important economic sector in the Dodoma region is livestock farming. In Dodoman villages, livestock prevent malnutrition, produce revenue, and determine the economic and social standing of households. 99 percent of the cattle raised is of an indigenous type that does well in the local climate. The Tanzania meat company (TMC) and S&Y Gourmet were the two businesses in the area that processed livestock products in the fiscal year that ended in June 2017. TMC processed 1,400 tonnes of goat and sheep meat for export in addition to 6,562.5 tonnes of beef for domestic consumption. 250 tonnes of cattle and 90 tonnes of goats and sheep were processed for export alone by S & Y Gourmet. 250 tonnes of beef and 1,490 tonnes of processed sheep and goats were transported to Vietnam, Iraq, Morocco, and Oman.

=== Industry ===
After agriculture, service workers, shop and stall sales workers are the second-most significant occupation in the area, employing around 5.3% of the active population. The artisans, which account for 3.3% of the active population, rank third. Census data also reveal that street sellers and related work are expanding quickly and are among the most important jobs in the region, accounting for 1.7% of the region's population aged 10 and over.

As of June 2018, the Dodoma region had the following profile: there were 2,325 industries, of which 1,262 (54% of the total) were engaged in the milling of maize, 436 (19%) in the processing of sunflower oil, 292 (13%) in tailoring, 6 (or 0.3%) in the processing of wine, 45 (or 1.9%) in carpentry, and the remaining few were engaged in the production of various goods. Dodoma is home to more than 52 distinct types of minerals, but local miners have had difficulty extracting them due to a lack of funding and up-to-date technical know-how. These include copper deposits in Tambi, Kimagai, and Kinusi in the Mpwapwa District; nickel deposits at Haneti in the Chamwino District; manganese deposits at Kibakwe in the Mpwapwa District; silica; enstatite in the Mpwapwa District; and scapolite (marialite-meionite) deposits in the Rubeho Mountains.

=== Infrastructure ===
The Dodoma region is easily accessible all year round thanks to its good road infrastructure. There is efficient transfer of commodities to and from neighboring regions. Most rural communities are well connected with year-round accessible roadways. The overall length of the region's road system is 8,183 km, of which 555 km are trunk highways, 1,142 km are regional roads, 3,054 km are district roads, and 3,432 km are village roads.

Dodoma region is connected by a paved trunk road (T3) that starts in Dar es Salaam on the coast, passes through Morogoro, Dodoma, and Singida, and ends at the Rwanda border. In 2016, a paved trunk road (T5) to Iringa was opened. The trunk road (T5) to Babati in Manyara Region was completed as of early 2018. Dodoma lies along the great North road, a major infrastructural network of Africa which connects Cairo to Cape Town.

The efficacy of the road network is measured by the condition of the roads during the rainy season. Dodoma region is fortunate in that more than half (75.9%) of its total road network is either 510 km of asphalt or 1,565.2 km of gravel, both of which are open all year round, including during the rainy season.

=== Railways ===
There are 9 railway stations in the Dodoma region, with the Kikombo, Ihumwa, Dodoma urban, and Zuzu stations owned by Dodoma city council; Bahi and Kigwe stations owned by the Bahi District; Godegode Msagali and Gulwe stations by the Mpwapwa District, and Igandu station by Chamwino.

The central railway of Tanzania passes through the city of Dodoma.

=== Airports ===
The region is served by Dodoma airport, which is 2 mi (3.2 km) by road from the train station (0.75 mi (1.21 km) as the crow flies), which is in the center of the city. In addition to the airport, there are four air strips: Mpwapwa town in Mpwawa, Mvumi village in Chamwino, Kondoa town in Kondoa, and Kongwa village in Kongwa. These airstrips are used for emergency services like flood relief and pest control for crops. Flying doctors that service the Mvumi mission district designated hospital use the Mvumi airstrip. A second airport in Dodoma is being built by the government in the Msalato area.

=== Communications ===
The Dodoma region has access to the internet, landline and mobile phone telephone services, and postal services. There are three television cable stations — Dodoma TV cable, Maneno TV cable, and FCN TV — as well as ten radio stations (Dodoma FM, Mwangaza FM, ABM FM, Nyemo FM, Kifimbo FM, Maisha FM, A-FM, RAS FM, Impact FM, and Uzima Radio) that broadcast from Dodoma city. Tanzanian local television networks include Tanzania Broadcasting Corporation (TBC) television, Independent television (ITV), Star TV, Azam TV, Clouds 360 TV, and Channel Ten.

A number of telephone providers, including Tanzania Telecommunication Company Limited (TTCL), Vodacom, Airtel, Tigo, Zantel, Halotel, and optical fiber networks, provide service to the area. Many of these companies service the majority of urban and rural areas.

=== Tourism ===
The Dodoma Region has a variety of tourist attractions, including two game reserves (Swaga Swaga game reserve and Mkugunero game reserve) where regulated hunting is permitted. Hunting is prohibited at Kidolea game reserve. Historical sites in the region include locations where freedom fighters from Mozambique, Zambia, Namibia, and South Africa stayed while training for their nations' independence. Dodoma is home to a UNESCO world heritage site, the Kondoa Rock-Art Sites in Kondoa District.

== Population ==
The Dodoma region is the ancestral homeland to the following ethnic groups: Gogo, Rangi, Sandawe and Burungi.

=== Demographics ===
According to the 2022 national census, the region had a population of 2,083,588. The region represented 4.8 percent of the total population of the Tanzanian mainland which was 43,625,354 in 2012. In 2012, it was the seventeenth most densely populated region, with 50 people per square kilometer. Dodoma District has the largest population at 410,956 in 2012. According to NBS's (2018) population forecasts, Dodoma had a total population of 2,312,141 in 2017, of which 1,126,309 were men and 1,185,833 were women. Annual population growth is 2.1 percent on average.

== Administrative divisions ==
=== Districts ===
Dodoma region is divided into seven districts, each administered by a council: (Kondoa, Chemba, Bahi, Dodoma, Chamwino, Kongwa, and Mpwapwa), eight local government authorities, 29 divisions, 209 wards, 607 villages, 181 streets, and 2,184 hamlets. Other districts each have a council, however Kondoa district has both Kondoa town council and Kondoa district council.

Districts of Dodoma Region
Map	District	Population (2012)	Area km^{2}	Divisions (Tarafa)	Wards (Kata)	Streets or Quarters (Mitaa)	Villages (Kijiji)
	Bahi District	221,645	5,949	4	22		59
	Chamwino District	330,543	8,056	5	36		107
	Chemba District	235,711	7,653	4	26		114
	Dodoma Municipal	410,956	2,576	4	41	170	18
	Kondoa District	269,704	5,557	5	29	11	109
	Kongwa District	309,973	4,041	3	22		87
	Mpwapwa District	305,056	7,479	4	33	18	113
	Total	2,083,588	41,311	29	209	199	607

== Health and education ==
Dodoma is the centre of educational activity in the region, with two universities. The University of Dodoma is situated at a 6,000-hectare (23 sq mi) site in the Chimwaga area about 8 kilometres (5.0 mi) east of downtown Dodoma. Established in 2007, in coordination with Tanzania's development vision 2025, the University of Dodoma is expected to have 50,000 students when fully functional, more than twice the size of the University of Dar es Salaam. The university had an expected enrollment of 40,000 in 2012, five years after opening. The second university is the St. John's University of Tanzania.

== Notable people from the Dodoma region ==
- John Malecela, 6th Tanzanian prime minister
- Norman Chihota, Sprinter and holder of the national record for 100m
- Mathias E. Mnyampala, writer
- May Balisidya, writer
- Hukwe Zawose, musician
- Joyce Kinabo, food scientist
