= Tambukareli =

Ward of Dodoma Municipal Council, Dodoma Region

Tambukareli Kata ya Tambukareli (Swahili)
- Ward of Dodoma Municipal Council
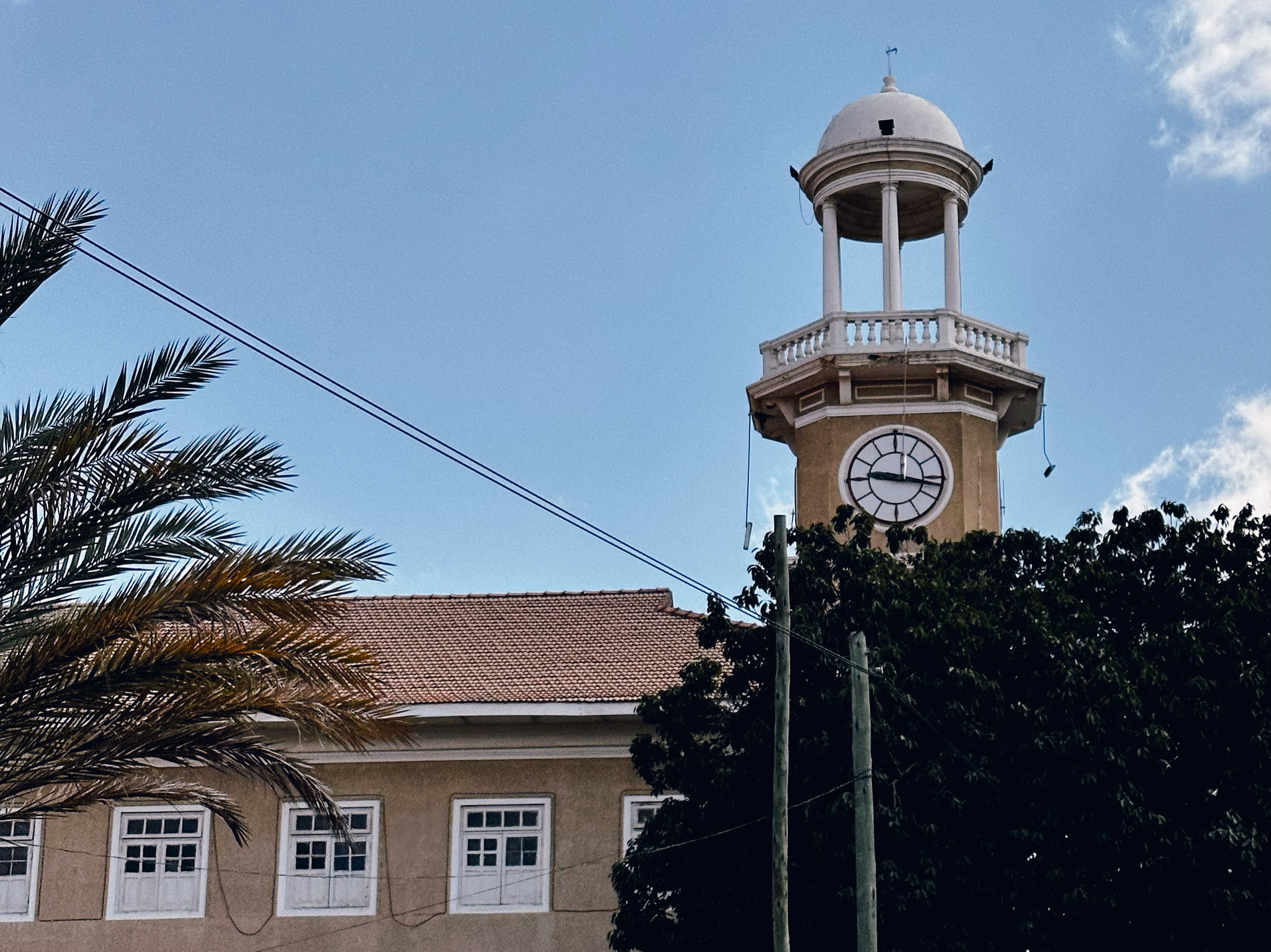
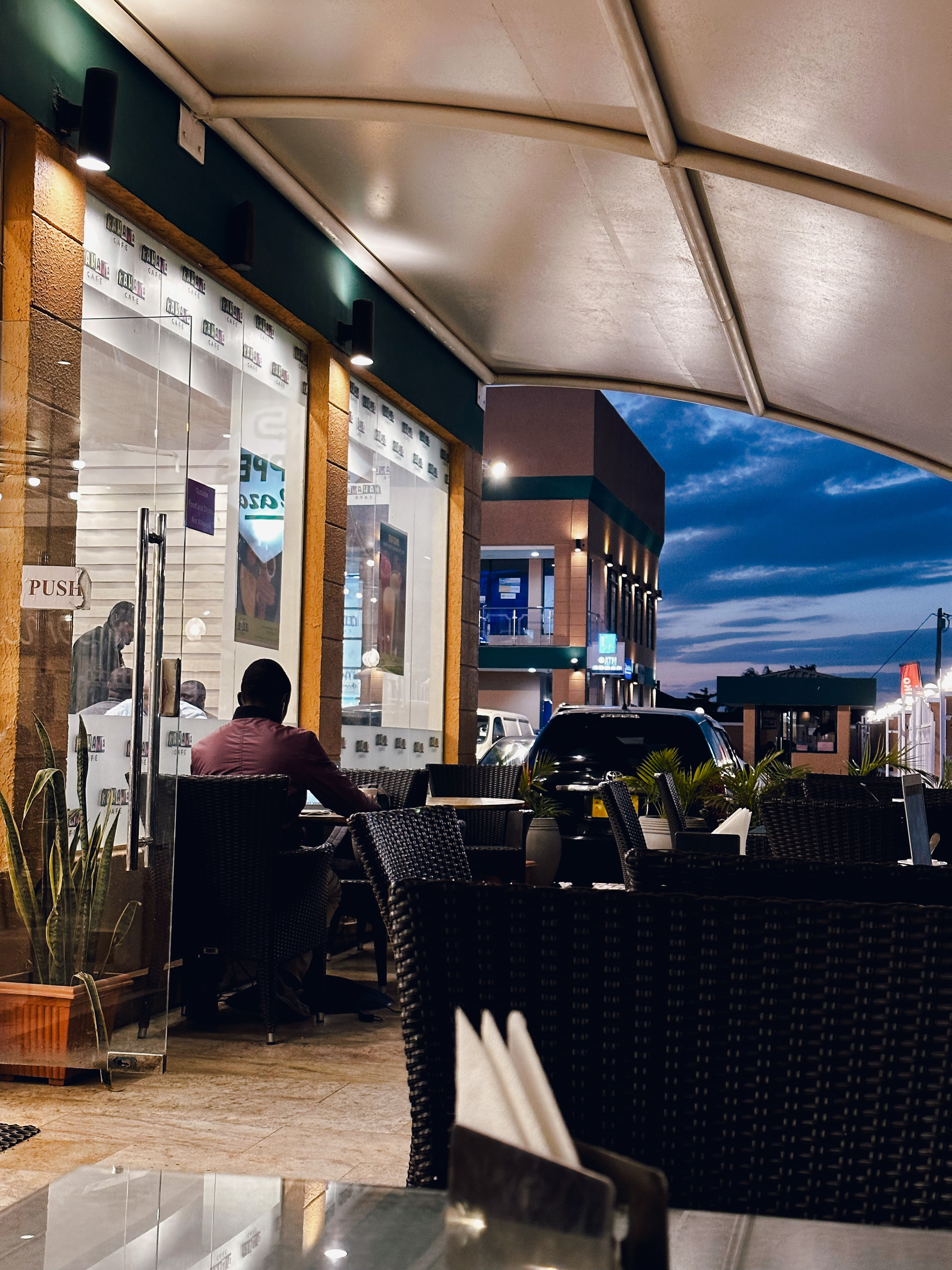
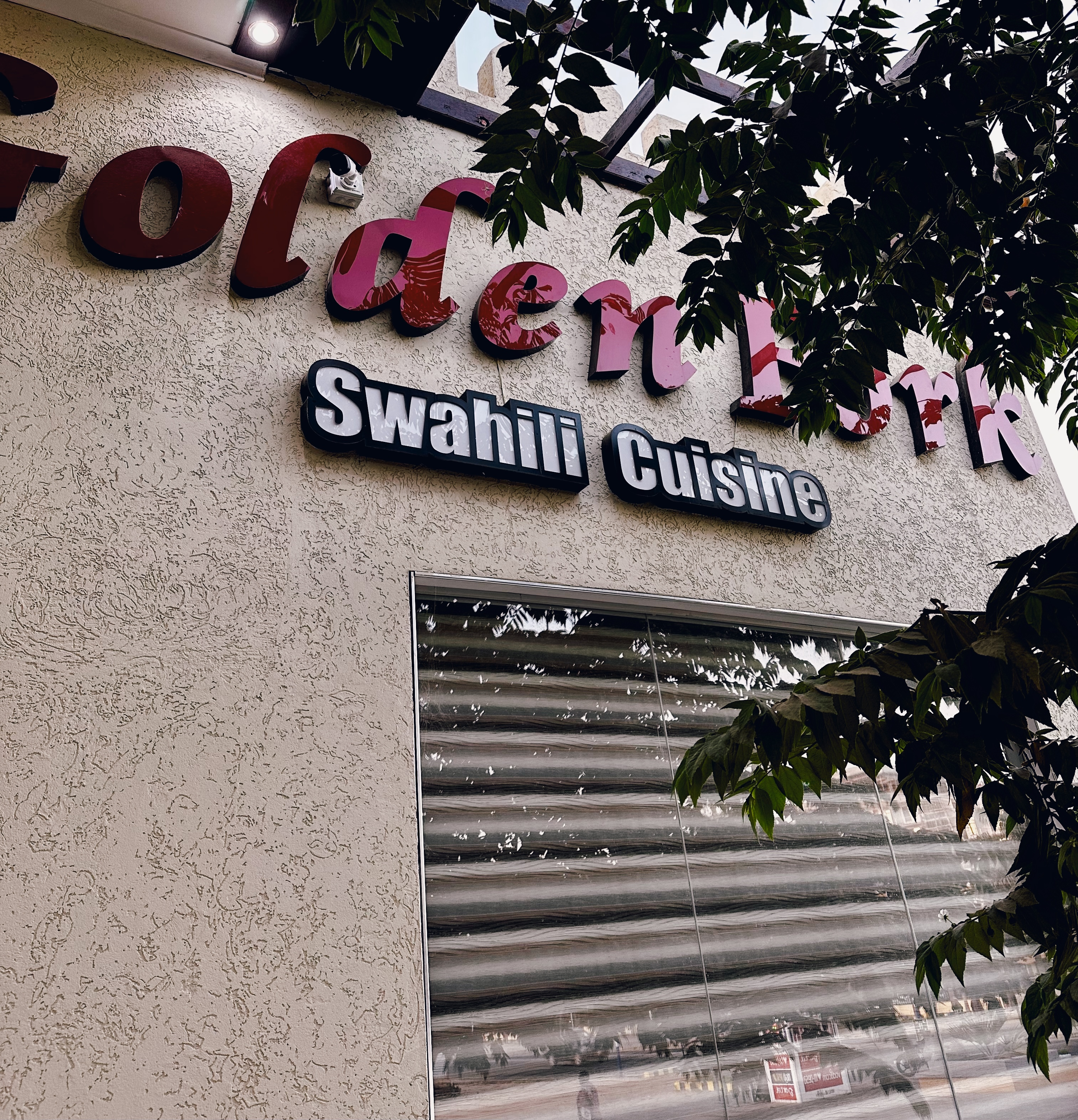
- From top to bottom: islamili Mosque in Tambukareli, Shopper's Plaza Dodoma located in Tambukareli, Swhaili cuisine restaurant in Tambukareli ward
- Interactive map of Tambukareli
- Coordinates: 6°10′49.18″S 35°45′0″E
- Country: Tanzania
- Region: Dodoma Region
- District: Dodoma Municipal Council

Area
  - Total: 3.6 km^{2} (1.4 sq mi)

Population (2012)
  - Total: 6,584

Ethnic groups
  - Settler: Swahili
  - Ancestral: Gogo people
- Tanzanian Postal Code: 41104

Tambukareli (Kata ya Tambukareli, in Swahili) is an administrative ward of the Dodoma Municipal Council of the Dodoma Region in Tanzania. The ward is bordered to the north by the wards of Makole, Viwandani, and Ipagala. Dodoma Makulu borders the ward to the east, while Ntyuka ward borders it to the south. Kilimani and Madukani wards border the ward on its western side. The ward is home to the Tanzanian National Assembly, Bunge. According to the 2012 census, the ward has a total population of 6,584.

== Administration ==
The postal code for the Tabukareli ward is 41104. The ward is divided into the following neighborhoods (Mitaa):

- Amani
- Reli

- Salimini
- Sechelela

=== Government ===
The ward, like every other ward in the country, has local government offices based on the population served.The Tambukareli Ward administration building houses a court as per the Ward Tribunal Act of 1988, including other vital departments for the administration the ward. The ward has the following administration offices:

- Tambukareli Police Station
- Tambukareli Government Office (Afisa Mtendaji)
- Tambukareli Ward Tribunal (Baraza La Kata) is a Department inside Ward Government Office

In the local government system of Tanzania, the ward is the smallest democratic unit. Each ward is composed of a committee of eight elected council members which include a chairperson, one salaried officer (with no voting rights), and an executive officer. One-third of seats are reserved for women councillors.

== Demographics ==
The ward serves as the Gogo people's ancestral home, along with much of the district. As the city developed throughout time, the ward became into a cosmopolitan ward. In total, 6,584 people called the ward home in 2012.

== Education and health ==
=== Education ===
The ward is home to these educational institutions

- Dodoma Mlimani Primary School
- Dar UI Muslmeen Primary School
- Medeli Primary School
- DCT Secondary School
- Decca College of Health and Allied Sciences, Tambukareli
- College of Business education, Tambukareli

=== Healthcare ===
The ward is home to the following health institutions:

- Right-Sight Eye Clinic
