= Makole, Dodoma Municipal Council =

Ward in Dodoma Municipal Council, Dodoma, Tanzania

Makole Kata ya Makole (Swahili)
- Ward of Dodoma Municipal Council
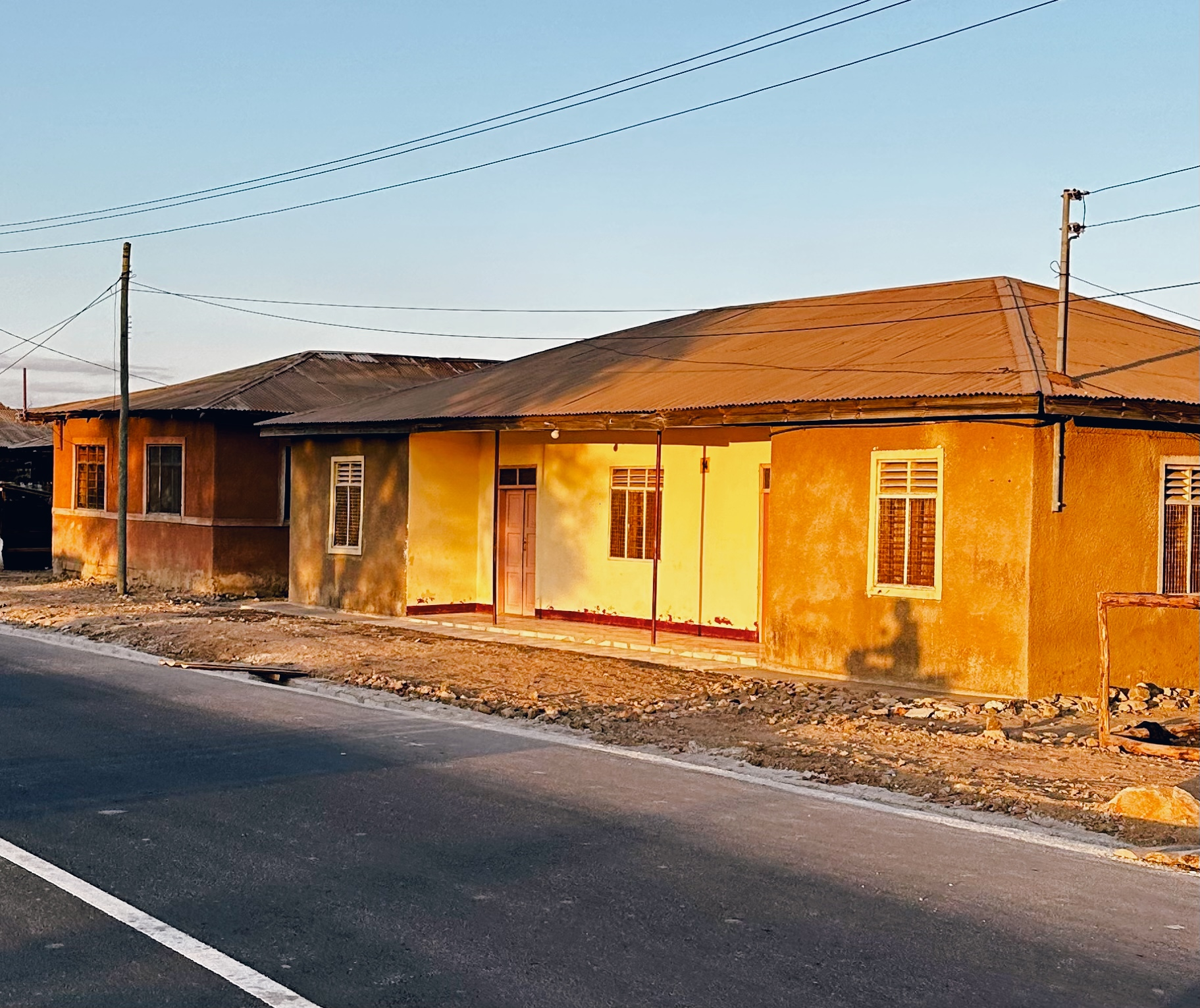
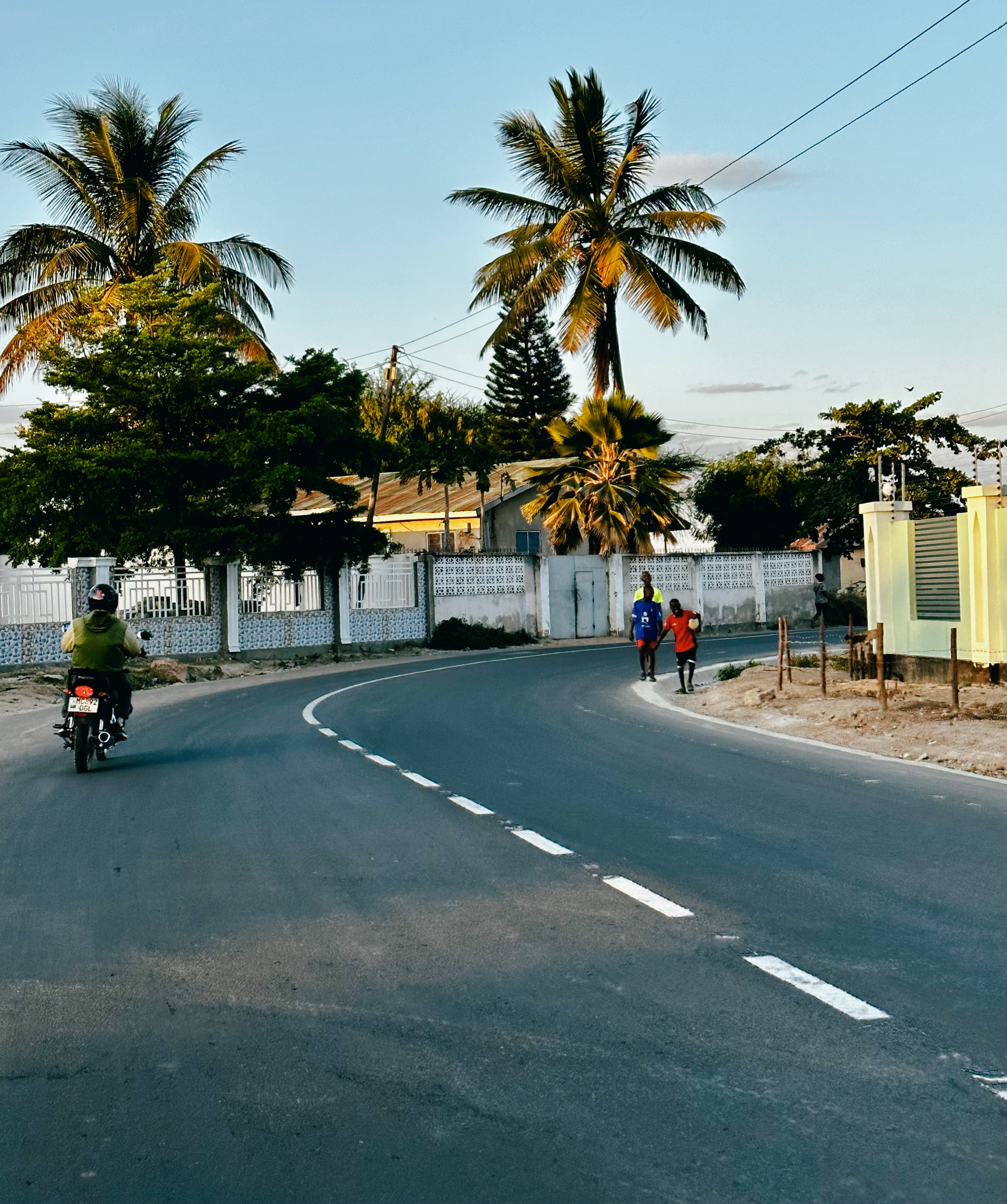
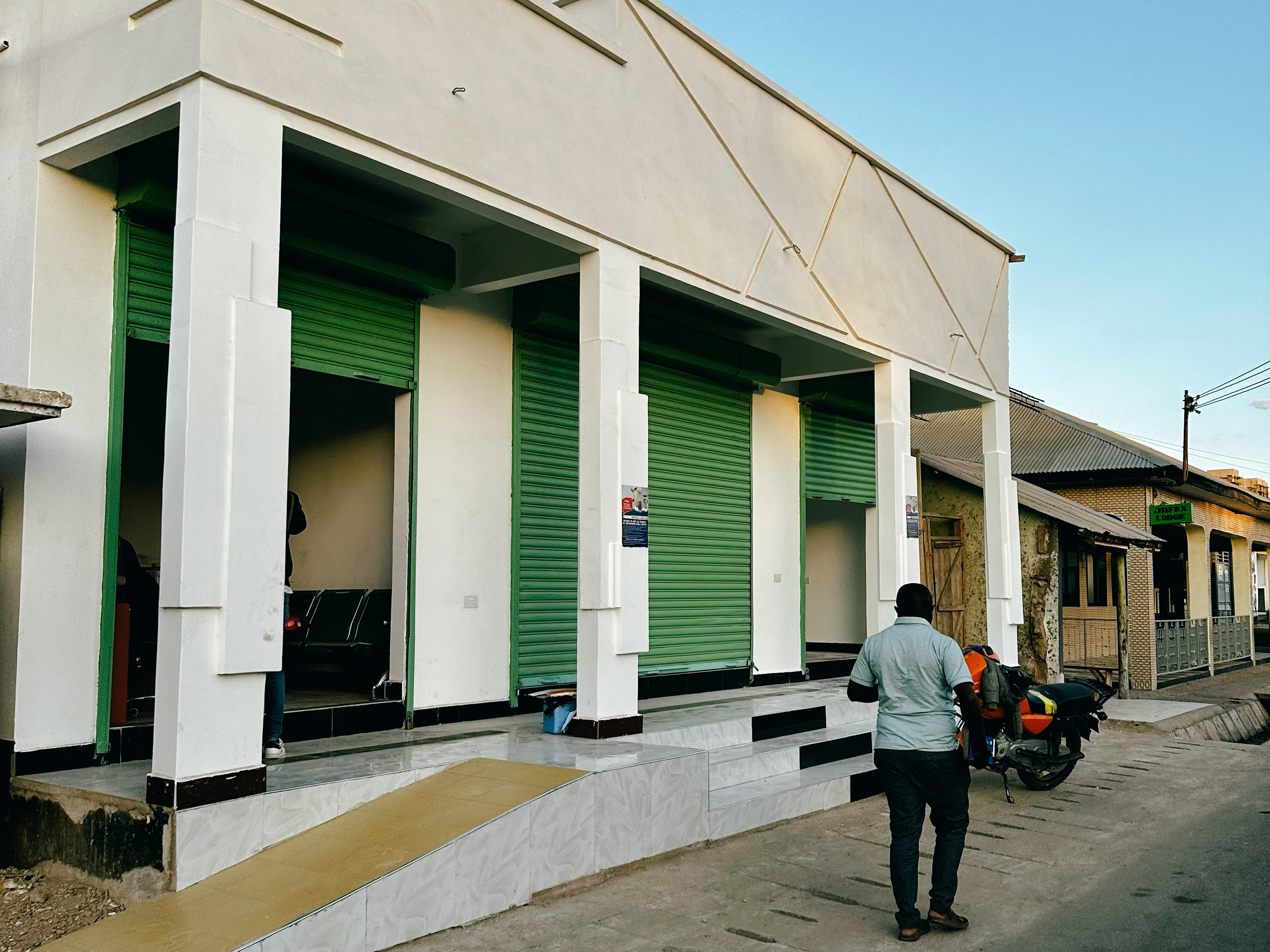
- From top to bottom: Old homes in Makole, road through Makole, Storefronts in Makole
- Interactive map of Makole
- Coordinates: 6°9′40.68″S 35°45′43.56″E
- Country: Tanzania
- Region: Dodoma Region
- District: Dodoma Municipal Council

Area
  - Total: 3.9 km^{2} (1.5 sq mi)
- Highest elevation (Lion Hill): 1,249 m (4,098 ft)

Population (2012)
  - Total: 10,504

Ethnic groups
  - Settler: Swahili
  - Ancestral: Gogo
- Tanzanian Postal Code: 41105

Makole (Kata ya Makole, in Swahili) is an administrative ward of the Dodoma Municipal Council of the Dodoma Region in Tanzania. The Miyuji and Ipagala wards border the ward to the north and east, respectively. By Tambukareli and Viwandani to the south. The ward is bordered to the west by Kiwanja cha Ndege. According to the 2012 census, the ward has a total population of 10,504.

== Administration ==
The postal code for the Makole ward is 41105. The ward is divided into the following neighborhoods (Mitaa):

- Chadulu "B"
- Chimuli

- Makole
- National Housing

=== Government ===
The ward, like every other ward in the country, has local government offices based on the population served.The Makole Ward administration building houses a court as per the Ward Tribunal Act of 1988, including other vital departments for the administration the ward. The ward has the following administration offices:

- Makole Police Station
- Makole Government Office (Afisa Mtendaji)
- Makole Ward Tribunal (Baraza La Kata) is a Department inside Ward Government Office

In the local government system of Tanzania, the ward is the smallest democratic unit. Each ward is composed of a committee of eight elected council members which include a chairperson, one salaried officer (with no voting rights), and an executive officer. One-third of seats are reserved for women councillors.

== Demographics ==
The ward serves as the Gogo people's ancestral home, along with much of the district. As the city developed throughout time, the ward became into a cosmopolitan ward. In total, 10,504 people called the ward home in 2012.

== Education and health ==
=== Education ===
The ward is home to these educational institutions

- Dodoma Secondary School
- Makole Primary School
- Chadulu Primary School
- DCT Holy Trinity Primary School

=== Healthcare ===
The ward is home to the following health institutions:

- Amani Hospital
- Village of Hope Health Center
- Makole Health Center
- DN Dispensary, Makole
