= Hombolo Bwawani =

Ward in Dodoma, Tanzania

Hombolo Bwawani Kata ya Hombolo Bwawani
- Ward
- Location within Tanzania
- Coordinates: 5.94270°S 35.97161°E
- Country: Tanzania
- Region: Dodoma Region
- District: Dodoma Urban
- Ward: Hombolo Bwawani

Government
  - MP: Antony Mavunde
  - Mayor: Professor Davis G. Mwamfupe
  - Councilor: Matayo Ndajilo Asedi

Population (2016)
  - Total: 14,748
- Time zone: UTC+3 (EAT)

Hombolo is an administrative ward in the Dodoma Urban district of the Dodoma Region of Tanzania. In 2016 the Tanzania National Bureau of Statistics report there were 14,748 people in the ward, from 22,457 in 2012 before Hombolo Makulu split off.
