= Majengo, Dodoma Municipal Council =

Ward in Dodoma, Tanzania

Majengo Kata ya Majengo (Swahili)
- Ward of Dodoma Municipal Council
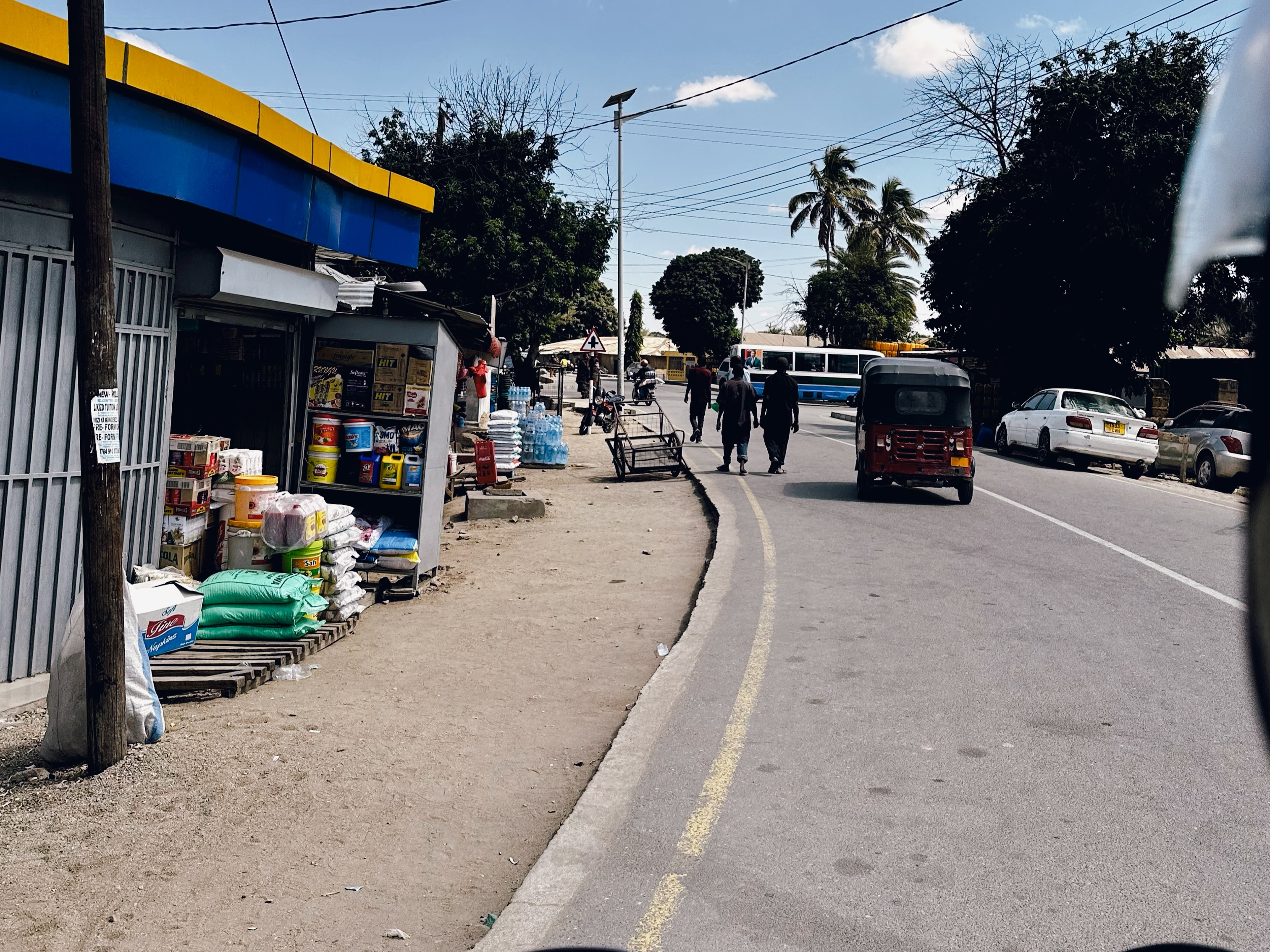
- From top to bottom: Street in Majengo ward
- Interactive map of Majengo
- Coordinates: 6°10′49.18″S 35°45′0″E
- Country: Tanzania
- Region: Dodoma Region
- District: Dodoma Municipal Council

Area
  - Total: 0.7 km^{2} (0.27 sq mi)

Population (2012)
  - Total: 5,214

Ethnic groups
  - Settler: Swahili
  - Ancestral: Gogo
- Tanzanian Postal Code: 41106

Majengo (Kata ya Majengo, in Swahili) is an administrative ward of the Dodoma Municipal Council of the Dodoma Region in Tanzania. The Chamwino and Kizota wards border the ward to the north. Uhuru borders the ward to the east, and Madukani borders it to the south. The ward is surrounded by Hazina ward to the west. The ward is home to the Dodoma Central Market. According to the 2012 census, the ward has a total population of 5,214.

== Administration ==
The postal code for the Majengo ward is 41106. The ward is divided into the following neighborhoods (Mitaa):

- Fatina
- Kitenge

- Mausi
- Mnyampala

=== Government ===
The ward, like every other ward in the country, has local government offices based on the population served.The Majengo Ward administration building houses a court as per the Ward Tribunal Act of 1988, including other vital departments for the administration the ward. The ward has the following administration offices:

- Majengo Police Station
- Majengo Government Office (Afisa Mtendaji)
- Majengo Ward Tribunal (Baraza La Kata) is a Department inside Ward Government Office

In the local government system of Tanzania, the ward is the smallest democratic unit. Each ward is composed of a committee of eight elected council members which include a chairperson, one salaried officer (with no voting rights), and an executive officer. One-third of seats are reserved for women councillors.

== Demographics ==
The ward serves as the Gogo people's ancestral home, along with much of the district. As the city developed throughout time, the ward became into a cosmopolitan ward. In total, 5,214 people called the ward home in 2012.

== Education and health ==
=== Education ===
The ward is home to these educational institutions

- Amani Primary School
- Dodoma Media College, Majengo

=== Healthcare ===
The ward is home to the following health institutions:

- Kitopeni Health Center
- Njiri Health Center
