= Madukani =

Ward in Dodoma, Tanzania

Madukani Kata ya Madukani (Swahili)
- Ward of Dodoma Municipal Council
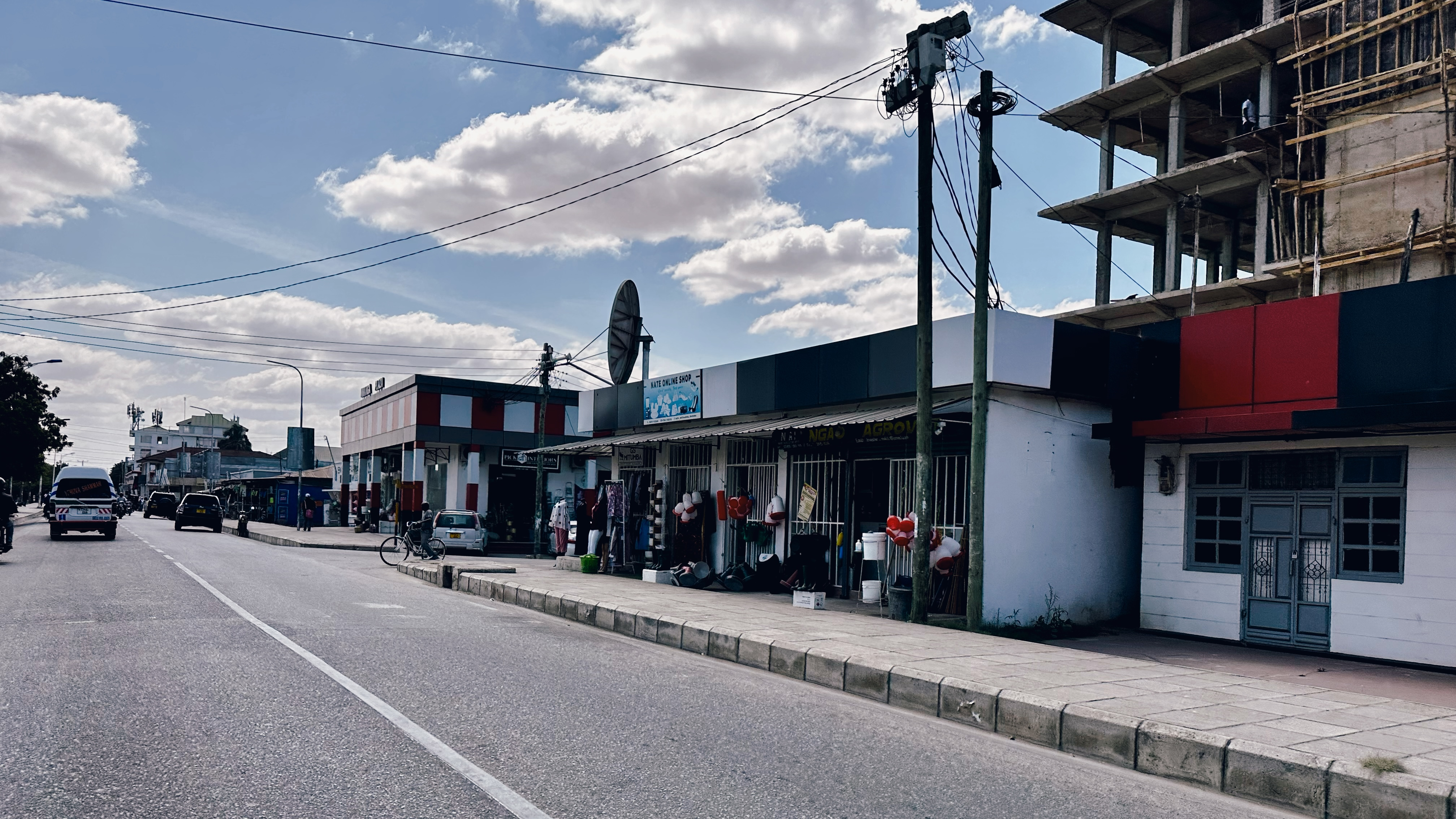
- From top to bottom: Street in Madukani ward
- Interactive map of Madukani
- Coordinates: 6°10′54.48″S 35°44′35.88″E
- Country: Tanzania
- Region: Dodoma Region
- District: Dodoma Municipal Council

Area
  - Total: 0.1 km^{2} (0.039 sq mi)

Population (2012)
  - Total: 2,421

Ethnic groups
  - Settler: Swahili
  - Ancestral: Gogo
- Tanzanian Postal Code: 41103

Madukani (Kata ya Madukani, in Swahili) is an administrative ward of the Dodoma Municipal Council of the Dodoma Region in Tanzania. Uhuru ward borders the ward on its northern side. Tambukareli and Viwandani border the ward to the east. Wards Kilimani and Hazina are to the south. Majengo ward borders the ward to the west. The Dodoma Regional Hospital, the biggest hospital in the region, is located in the ward. According to the 2012 census, the ward has a total population of 5,214.

== Administration ==
The postal code for the Madukani ward is 41103. The ward is divided into the following neighborhoods (Mitaa):

- Jamal
- Kamili
- Mmasi
- Relini
- Sululu

=== Government ===
Like every other ward in the country, Madukani has local government offices based on the population served.The Madukani Ward administration building houses a court as per the Ward Tribunal Act of 1988, including other vital departments for the administration the ward. The ward has the following administration offices:

- Madukani Police Station
- Madukani Government Office (Afisa Mtendaji)
- Madukani Ward Tribunal (Baraza La Kata) is a Department inside Ward Government Office

In the local government system of Tanzania, the ward is the smallest democratic unit. Each ward is composed of a committee of eight elected council members which include a chairperson, one salaried officer (with no voting rights), and an executive officer. One-third of seats are reserved for women councillors.

== Demographics ==
The ward serves as the Gogo people's ancestral home, along with much of the district. As the city developed throughout time, the ward became into a cosmopolitan ward. In total, 5,214 people called the ward home in 2012.

== Education and health ==
=== Education ===
The ward is home to these educational institutions

- Decca College of Health and Allied Sciences (borders the ward with Tambukareli)

=== Healthcare ===
The ward is home to the following health institutions:

- Bunge Health Center
- Upendo Health Center
- St.Camillus Specialized Hospital
- Dodoma Regional Hospital
