= Kikuyu Kaskazini =

Ward in Dodoma, Tanzania

- Ward
- Location within Tanzania
- Coordinates: 6.19406678°S 35.7232055°E
- Tanganyika: Tanzania
- Administrative Wards: Kikuyu Kaskazini
- Seat: Dodoma

Government
  - Type: Dodoma District Council
  - Leadership: Leader & Cabinet
  - MP: Antony Mavunde
  - Mayor: Professor Davis G. Mwamfupe
  - Councilor: Israel Moses Mwansasu
- Time zone: UTC+03 (Greenwich Mean Time)
  - Summer (DST): UTC+03

Kikuyu Kaskazini is an administrative ward in the Dodoma Urban district of the Dodoma Region of Tanzania. In 2016 the Tanzania National Bureau of Statistics report there were 10,707 people in the ward, from 9,852 in 2012.
