= Msalato =

Ward in Dodoma, Tanzania

Msalato Kata ya Msalato
- Ward
- Location within Tanzania
- Coordinates: 6.06747967°S 35.7542322°E
- Country: Tanzania
- Region: Dodoma Region
- District: Dodoma Urban
- Ward: Msalato

Government
  - MP: Antony Mavunde
  - Mayor: Professor Davis G. Mwamfupe
  - Councilor: Ally Mdende Mohamed

Population (2016)
  - Total: 7,301
- Time zone: UTC+3 (EAT)

Msalato is an administrative ward in the Dodoma Urban district of the Dodoma Region of Tanzania. In 2016 the Tanzania National Bureau of Statistics report there were 7,301 people in the ward, from 6,718 in 2012.
