= Viwandani =

Ward in Dodoma, Tanzania

Viwandani Kata ya Viwandani (Swahili)
- Ward of Dodoma Municipal Council
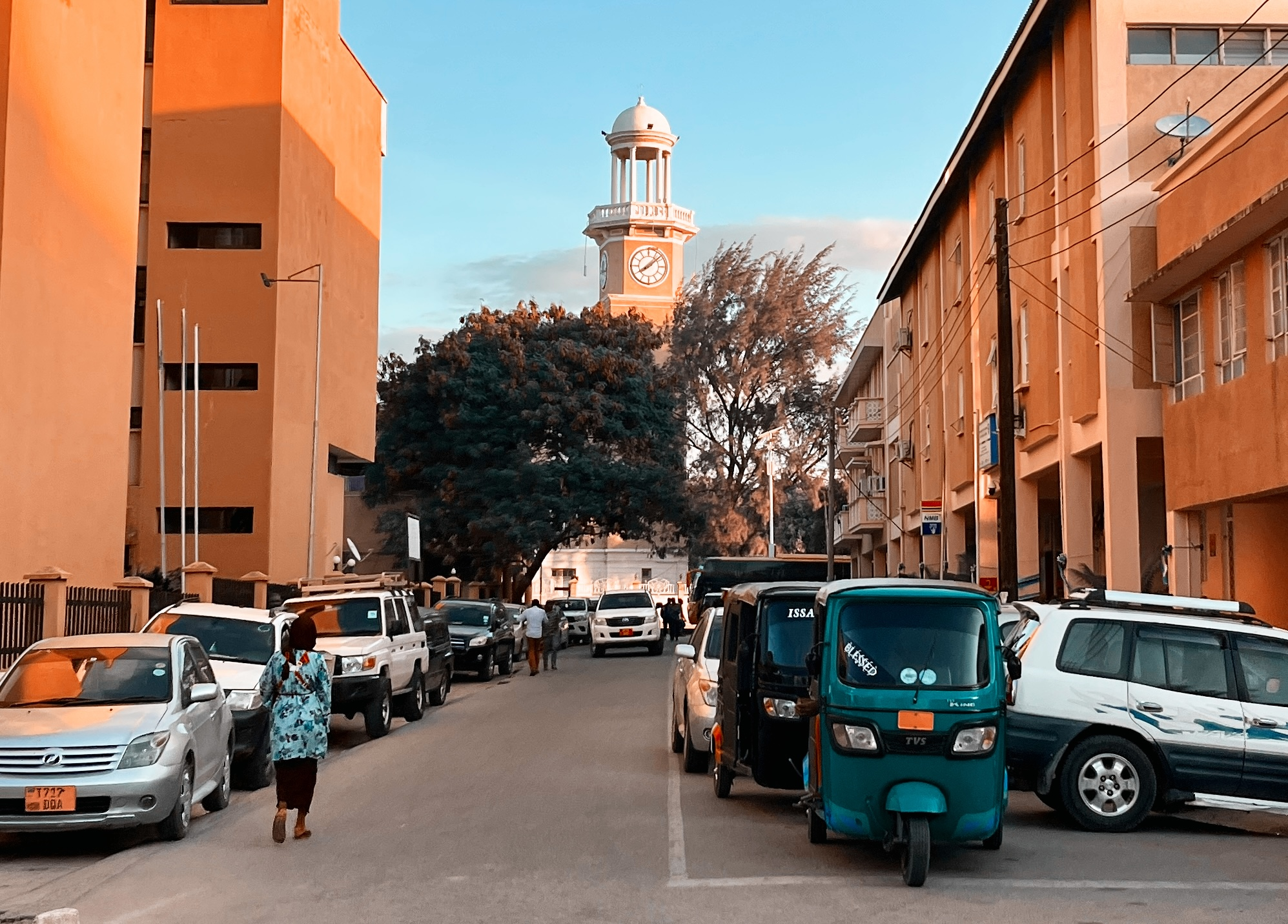
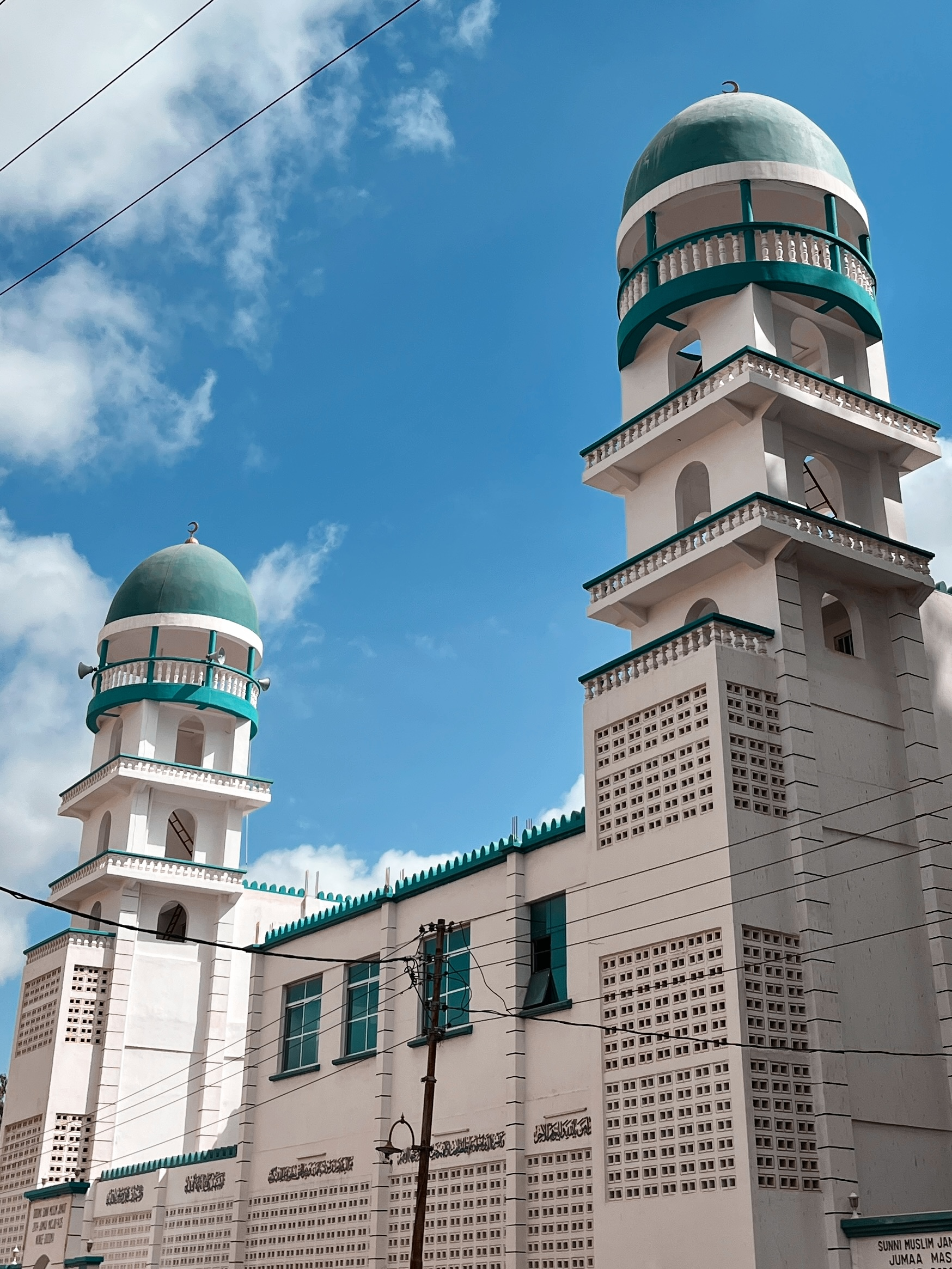
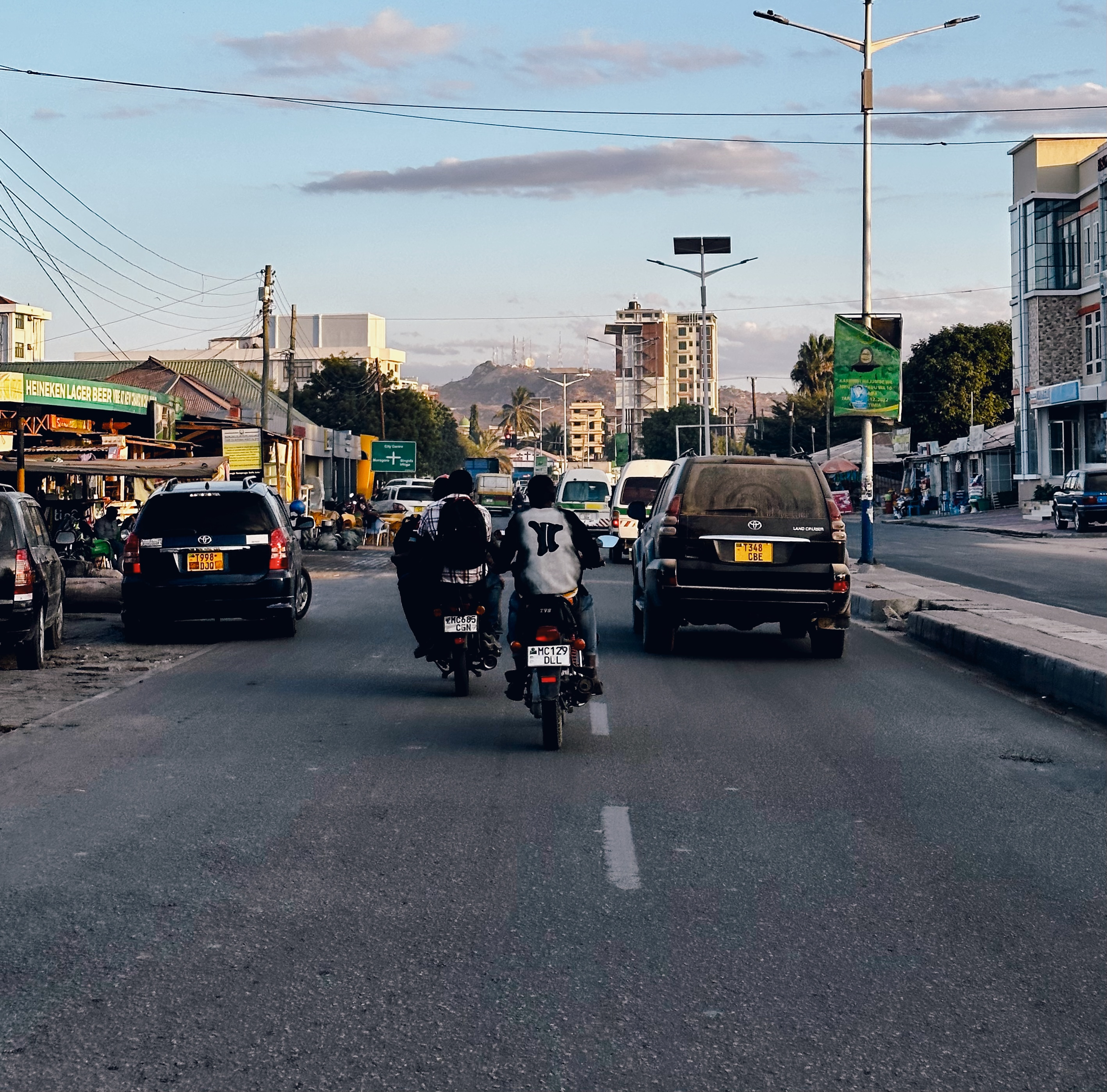
- From top to bottom: Scene in Viwandani, Masjid Minarets in Viwandani & Road in Viwandani
- Interactive map of Viwandani
- Coordinates: 6°10′24.96″S 35°44′51″E
- Country: Tanzania
- Region: Dodoma Region
- District: Dodoma Municipal Council

Area
  - Total: 1.2 km^{2} (0.46 sq mi)

Population (2012)
  - Total: 4,883

Ethnic groups
  - Settler: Swahili
  - Ancestral: Gogo people
- Tanzanian Postal Code: 41102

Viwandani (Kata ya Viwandani, in Swahili) is an administrative ward of the Dodoma Municipal Council of the Dodoma Region in Tanzania. The ward is bordered to the north by the wards of Makole to the east and Kiwanja cha Ndege to the north. The Tambukareli ward is in the south. Uhuru, Chamwino, and Madukani wards are to the west. The ward is home the Gaddafi Mosque, Sabasaba Market and Nyerere Square. According to the 2012 census, the ward has a total population of 4,883.

== Administration ==
The postal code for the Viwandani ward is 41102. The ward is divided into the following neighborhoods (Mitaa):

- Baruti
- Kinyali
- Marijani

- Samora
- Tofiki

=== Government ===
The ward, like every other ward in the country, has local government offices based on the population served.The Viwandani Ward administration building houses a court as per the Ward Tribunal Act of 1988, including other vital departments for the administration the ward. The ward has the following administration offices:

- Viwandani Police Station
- Viwandani Government Office (Afisa Mtendaji)
- Viwandani Ward Tribunal (Baraza La Kata) is a Department inside Ward Government Office

In the local government system of Tanzania, the ward is the smallest democratic unit. Each ward is composed of a committee of eight elected council members which include a chairperson, one salaried officer (with no voting rights), and an executive officer. One-third of seats are reserved for women councillors.

== Demographics ==
The ward serves as the Gogo people's ancestral home, along with much of the district. As the city developed throughout time, the ward became into a cosmopolitan ward. In total, 4,883 people called the ward home in 2012.

== Education and health ==
=== Education ===
The ward is home to these educational institutions

- Nguji Primary School
- St.Mark's Primary School
- Queen Ester Secondary School
- Emanyata Secondary School
- Dodoma Central Secondary School
- Central Bible College, Viwandani

=== Healthcare ===
The ward is home to the following health institutions:

- Dodoma Medicare Specialized Clinic Health Center
- Mwangaza Polyclinic
- Makole Health Center
- Avenue Medical Clinic
