= Iyumbu =

Ward in Dodoma, Tanzania

Iyumbu Kata ya Iyumbu
- Ward
- Location within Tanzania
- Coordinates: 6.20153607°S 35.8403126°E
- Country: Tanzania
- Region: Dodoma Region
- District: Dodoma Urban
- Ward: Iyumbu
- Seat: Dodoma

Government
  - Type: Dodoma District Council
  - Leadership: Leader & Cabinet
  - MP: Antony Mavunde
  - Mayor: Professor Davis G. Mwamfupe
  - Councilor: Hezron Kudugwa

Population (2016)
  - Total: 2,934
- Time zone: UTC+3 (EAT)

Iyumbu is an administrative ward in the Dodoma Urban district of the Dodoma Region of Tanzania. In 2016 the Tanzania National Bureau of Statistics report there were 2,934 people in the ward, from 2,700 in 2012.
