= Zuzu (Tanzanian ward) =

Ward in Dodoma, Tanzania

Zuzu Kata ya Zuzu
- Ward
- Location within Tanzania
- Country: Tanzania
- Region: Dodoma Region
- District: Dodoma Urban
- Ward: Zuzu

Government
  - MP: Antony Mavunde
  - Mayor: Professor Davis G. Mwamfupe
  - Councilor: Abdalah Ajghuhum Awadhi

Population (2016)
  - Total: 7,048
- Time zone: UTC+3 (EAT)

Zuzu is an administrative ward in the Dodoma Urban district of the Dodoma Region of Tanzania. In 2016 the Tanzania National Bureau of Statistics report there were 7,048 people in the ward, from 6,485 in 2012.
