= Nzuguni =

Ward in Dodoma, Tanzania

Nzuguni Kata ya Nzuguni
- Ward
- Location within Tanzania
- Coordinates: 6.11703542°S 35.85198536°E
- Country: Tanzania
- Region: Dodoma Region
- District: Dodoma Urban
- Ward: Nzuguni

Government
  - MP: Antony Mavunde
  - Mayor: Professor Davis G. Mwamfupe
  - Councilor: Aloyce Marcel Luhaga

Population (2016)
  - Total: 16,809
- Time zone: UTC+3 (EAT)

Nzuguni is an administrative ward in the Dodoma Urban district of the Dodoma Region of Tanzania. In 2016 the Tanzania National Bureau of Statistics report there were 16,809 people in the ward, from 15,466 in 2012.
