= Ihumwa =

Ward in Dodoma, Tanzania

Ihumwa Kata ya Ihumwa
- Ward
- Location within Tanzania
- Country: Tanzania
- Region: Dodoma Region
- District: Dodoma Urban
- Ward: Ihumwa

Government
  - MP: Antony Mavunde
  - Mayor: Professor Davis G. Mwamfupe
  - Councilor: Robert Mgazwa Mbinda

Population (2016)
  - Total: 11,490
- Time zone: UTC+3 (EAT)

Ihumwa is an administrative ward in the Dodoma Urban district of the Dodoma Region of Tanzania. In 2016 the Tanzania National Bureau of Statistics report there were 11,490 people in the ward.
