= Mpunguzi =

Ward in Dodoma, Tanzania

Mpunguzi Kata ya Mpunguzi
- Ward
- Location within Tanzania
- Coordinates: 6.39677061°S 35.745767°E
- Country: Tanzania
- Region: Dodoma Region
- District: Dodoma Urban
- Ward: Mpunguzi

Government
  - MP: Antony Mavunde
  - Mayor: Professor Davis G. Mwamfupe
  - Councilor: Innocent Nyambuya

Population (2016)
  - Total: 15,656
- Time zone: UTC+3 (EAT)

Mpunguzi is an administrative ward in the Dodoma Urban district of the Dodoma Region of Tanzania. In 2016 the Tanzania National Bureau of Statistics report there were 15,656 people in the ward, from 17,891 in 2012.
