= Nala, Dodoma Municipal Council =

Ward in Dodoma, Tanzania

Nala Kata ya Nala
- Ward
- Location within Tanzania
- Coordinates: 6.091367°S 35.6389214°E
- Country: Tanzania
- Region: Dodoma Region
- District: Dodoma Urban
- Ward: Nala

Government
  - MP: Antony Mavunde
  - Mayor: Professor Davis G. Mwamfupe
  - Councilor: Eliah B. Leonard

Population (2016)
  - Total: 6,050
- Time zone: UTC+3 (EAT)

Nala is an administrative ward in the Dodoma Urban district of the Dodoma Region of Tanzania. In 2016 the Tanzania National Bureau of Statistics report there were 6,050 people in the ward, from 5,567 in 2012.
