= Matumbulu =

Ward in Dodoma, Tanzania

Matumbulu Kata ya Matumbulu
- Ward
- Location within Tanzania
- Country: Tanzania
- Region: Dodoma Region
- District: Dodoma Urban
- Ward: Matumbulu

Government
  - MP: Antony Mavunde
  - Mayor: Professor Davis G. Mwamfupe
  - Councilor: Samson Emanuel Chibago

Population (2016)
  - Total: 3,789
- Time zone: UTC+3 (EAT)

Matumbulu is an administrative ward in the Dodoma Urban district of the Dodoma Region of Tanzania. In 2016 the Tanzania National Bureau of Statistics report there were 3,789 people in the ward.
