= Chang'ombe, Dodoma Municipal Council =

Ward of Dodoma City Council, Tanzania

Chang'ombe Kata ya Chang'ombe
- Ward
- Location within Tanzania
- Coordinates: 6.1497113°S 35.733935°E
- Country: Tanzania
- Region: Dodoma Region
- District: Dodoma Urban
- Ward: Chang'ombe
- Established: 1984

Government
  - Type: Council
  - MP: Antony Mavunde
  - Mayor: Professor Davis G. Mwamfupe
  - Councilor: Samuel Bakar Fundikira

Area
  - Total: 3.04 km^{2} (1.17 sq mi)
- Elevation: 1,141 m (3,743 ft)

Population (2016)
  - Total: 13,676
  - Density: 4,500/km^{2} (11,700/sq mi)
- Time zone: UTC+3 (EAT)
- Postcode: 026
- Area code: 41xxx
- Website: District Website

Chang'ombe is an administrative ward in the Dodoma Urban district of the Dodoma Region of Tanzania. The ward covers an area of 3.04 km^{2} (1.17 sq mi) with an average elevation of 1,141 m (3,743 ft).

In 2016 the Tanzania National Bureau of Statistics report there were 13,676 people in the ward, from 25,415 in 2012. The ward has 4,500 inhabitants per square kilometre (12,000/sq mi).
