= Nkuhungu =

Ward in Dodoma, Tanzania

Nkuhungu Kata ya Nkuhungu
- Ward
- Location within Tanzania
- Coordinates: 6.1456377°S 35.7204982°E
- Country: Tanzania
- Region: Dodoma Region
- District: Dodoma Urban
- Ward: Nkuhungu

Government
  - MP: Antony Mavunde
  - Mayor: Professor Davis G. Mwamfupe
  - Councilor: Daudi Jonas Mkandi

Population (2016)
  - Total: 26,088
- Time zone: UTC+3 (EAT)

Nkuhungu is an administrative ward in the Dodoma Urban district of the Dodoma Region of Tanzania. In 2016 the Tanzania National Bureau of Statistics report there were 26,088 people in the ward.
