= Ngh'ongh'onha =

Ward in Dodoma, Tanzania

Ng'hong'honha Kata ya Ng'hong'honha
- Ward
- Location within Tanzania
- Coordinates: 6.244122°S 35.8347479°E
- Country: Tanzania
- Region: Dodoma Region
- District: Dodoma Urban
- Ward: Ng'hong'honha

Government
  - MP: Antony Mavunde
  - Mayor: Professor Davis G. Mwamfupe
  - Councilor: Philipo Edward Nanga

Population (2016)
  - Total: 10,364
- Time zone: UTC+3 (EAT)

Ng'hong'honha is an administrative ward in the Dodoma Urban district of the Dodoma Region of Tanzania. In 2016 the Tanzania National Bureau of Statistics report there were 10,364 people in the ward, from 9,536 in 2012.
