= Mbabala =

Ward in Dodoma, Tanzania

Mbabala Kata ya Mbabala
- Ward
- Location within Tanzania
- Coordinates: 6.29002744°S 35.62168656°E
- Country: Tanzania
- Region: Dodoma Region
- District: Dodoma Urban
- Ward: Mbabala

Government
  - MP: Antony Mavunde
  - Mayor: Professor Davis G. Mwamfupe
  - Councilor: Paskazia Charles Mayala

Population (2016)
  - Total: 12,934
- Time zone: UTC+3 (EAT)

Mbabala is an administrative ward in the Dodoma Urban district of the Dodoma Region of Tanzania. In 2016 the Tanzania National Bureau of Statistics reported that there were 12,934 people in the ward, from 11,901 in 2012.
