= Kikuyu Kusini =

Ward in Dodoma, Tanzania

Kikuyu Kusini Kata ya Kikuyu Kusini
- Ward
- Location within Tanzania
- Coordinates: 6.205601°S 35.730888°E
- Country: Tanzania
- Region: Dodoma Region
- District: Dodoma Urban
- Ward: Kikuyu Kusini
- Seat: Dodoma

Government
  - Type: Dodoma District Council
  - Leadership: Leader & Cabinet
  - MP: Antony Mavunde
  - Mayor: Professor Davis G. Mwamfupe
  - Councilor: Anselm Martin Kutika

Population (2016)
  - Total: 6,493
- Time zone: UTC+3 (EAT)

Kikuyu Kusini is an administrative ward in the Dodoma Urban district of the Dodoma Region of Tanzania. In 2016 the Tanzania National Bureau of Statistics report there were 6,493 people in the ward, from 5,974 in 2012.
