= Makutupora =

Ward in Dodoma, Tanzania

Makutupora Kata ya Makutupora
- Ward
- Location within Tanzania
- Coordinates: 5.99491487°S 35.7488186°E
- Country: Tanzania
- Region: Dodoma Region
- District: Dodoma Urban
- Ward: Makutupora

Government
  - MP: Antony Mavunde
  - Mayor: Professor Davis G. Mwamfupe
  - Councilor: Elias Lenjila Elia

Population (2016)
  - Total: 15,683
- Time zone: UTC+3 (EAT)

Makutupora is an administrative ward in the Dodoma Urban district of the Dodoma Region of Tanzania. In 2016 the Tanzania National Bureau of Statistics report there were 15,683 people in the ward, from 14,430 in 2012.

== Transportation ==
The railway will be replaced by the Standard Gauge Railway from Dar es Salaam and in early 2023 the construction of a freight station and a new Passenger station for Makutupora was near complete.
