= Mkonze =

Ward in Dodoma, Tanzania

Mkonze Kata ya Mkonze
- Ward
- Location within Tanzania
- Country: Tanzania
- Region: Dodoma Region
- District: Dodoma Urban
- Ward: Mkonze

Government
  - MP: Antony Mavunde
  - Mayor: Professor Davis G. Mwamfupe
  - Councilor: David Jackson Bochel

Population (2016)
  - Total: 13,602
- Time zone: UTC+3 (EAT)

Mkonze is an administrative ward in the Dodoma Urban district of the Dodoma Region of Tanzania. In 2016 the Tanzania National Bureau of Statistics report there were 13,602 people in the ward, from 12,515 in 2012.
