= Ipala, Dodoma Municipal Council =

Ward in Dodoma, Tanzania

Ipala Kata ya Ipala
- Ward
- Location within Tanzania
- Country: Tanzania
- Region: Dodoma Region
- District: Dodoma Urban
- Ward: Ipala

Government
  - MP: Antony Mavunde
  - Mayor: Professor Davis G. Mwamfupe

Population (2016)
  - Total: 6,549
- Time zone: UTC+3 (EAT)

Ipala is an administrative ward in the Dodoma Urban district of the Dodoma Region of Tanzania. In 2016 the Tanzania National Bureau of Statistics report there were 6,549 people in the ward, from 6,026 in 2012.
