= Chahwa =

Ward in Dodoma, Tanzania

Chahwa Kata ya Chahwa
- Ward
- Location within Tanzania
- Coordinates: 6°03′S 35°59′E
- Country: Tanzania
- Region: Dodoma Region
- District: Dodoma Urban
- Ward: Chahwa

Government
  - MP: Antony Mavunde
  - Mayor: Professor Davis G. Mwamfupe
  - Councilor: Sospeter N. Mazengo
  - Ward Executive Officer: Juma Abdalah

Population (2016)
  - Total: 4,744
- Time zone: UTC+3 (EAT)

Chahwa is an administrative ward in the Dodoma Urban district of the Dodoma Region of Tanzania. In 2016 the Tanzania National Bureau of Statistics report there were 4,744 people in the ward, from 4,365 in 2012.
