= Uhuru, Dodoma Municipal Council =

Ward in Tanzania, United Republic of Tanzania

Uhuru Kata ya Uhuru (Swahili)
- Ward of Dodoma Municipal Council
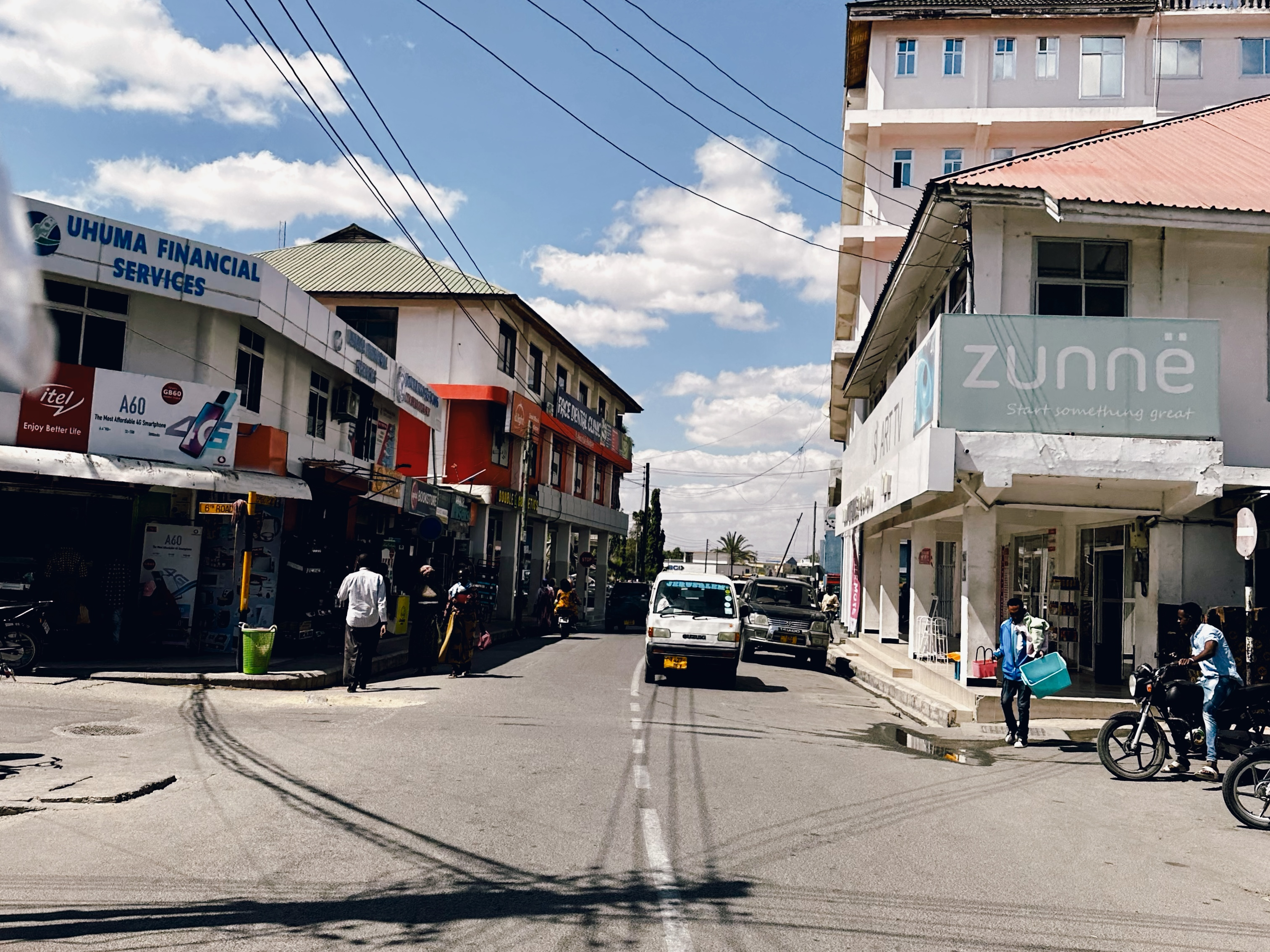
- From top to bottom: Street in Uhuru ward of Dodoma MC
- Interactive map of Uhuru
- Coordinates: 6°10′32.88″S 35°44′38.76″E
- Country: Tanzania
- Region: Dodoma Region
- District: Dodoma Municipal Council

Area
  - Total: 0.2 km^{2} (0.077 sq mi)

Population (2012)
  - Total: 2,419

Ethnic groups
  - Settler: Swahili
  - Ancestral: Gogo people
- Tanzanian Postal Code: 41101

Uhuru (Kata ya Uhuru, in Swahili) is an administrative ward of the Dodoma Municipal Council of the Dodoma Region in Tanzania. The Chamwino and Kiwanja cha Ndege wards border the ward on its northern border. The ward is bordered by the Viwandani and Madukani wards to the east and south, respectively. Majengo ward borders the ward to the west. According to the 2012 census, the ward has a total population of 2,419.

== Administration ==
The postal code for the Uhuru ward is 41101. The ward is divided into the following neighborhoods (Mitaa):

- Kati, Uhuru
- Kipande

- Mji Mpya, Uhuru
- Uhuru, Uhuru

=== Government ===
The ward, like every other ward in the country, has local government offices based on the population served.The Uhuru Ward administration building houses a court as per the Ward Tribunal Act of 1988, including other vital departments for the administration the ward. The ward has the following administration offices:

- Uhuru Police Station
- Uhuru Government Office (Afisa Mtendaji)
- Uhuru Ward Tribunal (Baraza La Kata) is a Department inside Ward Government Office

In the local government system of Tanzania, the ward is the smallest democratic unit. Each ward is composed of a committee of eight elected council members which include a chairperson, one salaried officer (with no voting rights), and an executive officer. One-third of seats are reserved for women councillors.

== Demographics ==
The ward serves as the Gogo people's ancestral home, along with much of the district. As the city developed throughout time, the ward became into a cosmopolitan ward. In total, 2,419 people called the ward home in 2012.

== Education and health ==
=== Education ===
The ward is home to these educational institutions

- Uhuru Primary School
- Dodoma Central Secondary School

=== Healthcare ===
The ward is home to the following health institutions:

- Aga Khan Medical Center (On the border with Madukani)
