= Kikombo =

Ward in Tanzania

- Ward
- Location within Tanzania
- Coordinates: 6.334207°S 36.4993562°E
- Country: Tanzania
- Region: Dodoma Region
- District: Dodoma Urban
- Ward: Kikombo
- Seat: Dodoma

Government
  - Type: Dodoma District Council
  - Leadership: Leader & Cabinet
  - MP: Antony Mavunde
  - Mayor: Professor Davis G. Mwamfupe
  - Councilor: Elisha Yona kusaja

Population (2016)
  - Total: 9,067
- Time zone: UTC+03 (Greenwich Mean Time)
  - Summer (DST): UTC+03

Kikombo is an administrative ward in the Dodoma Urban district of the Dodoma Region of Tanzania. In 2016 the Tanzania National Bureau of Statistics report there were 9,067 people in the ward, from 8,343 in 2012.
