= Chihanga =

Ward in Dodoma, Tanzania

Chihanga Kata ya Chihanga
- Ward
- Location within Tanzania
- Country: Tanzania
- Region: Dodoma Region
- District: Dodoma Urban
- Ward: Chihanga

Government
  - MP: Antony Mavunde
  - Mayor: Professor Davis G. Mwamfupe
  - Councilor: Gabriel Rafael Mdachi

Population (2016)
  - Total: 11,959
- Time zone: UTC+3 (EAT)

Chihanga is an administrative ward in the Dodoma Urban district of the Dodoma Region of Tanzania. In 2016 the Tanzania National Bureau of Statistics report there were 11,959 people in the ward, from 11,004 in 2012.
