= Mbalawala =

Ward in Dodoma, Tanzania

Mbalawala Kata ya Mbalawala
- Ward
- Location within Tanzania
- Country: Tanzania
- Region: Dodoma Region
- District: Dodoma Urban
- Ward: Mbalawala

Government
  - MP: Antony Mavunde
  - Mayor: Professor Davis G. Mwamfupe
  - Councilor: Silverster Pala Mang'ati

Population (2016)
  - Total: 9,597
- Time zone: UTC+3 (EAT)

Mbalawala is an administrative ward in the Dodoma Urban district of the Dodoma Region of Tanzania. In 2016 the Tanzania National Bureau of Statistics report there were 9,597 people in the ward, from 8,830 in 2012.
