= Chigongwe =

Ward in Dodoma, Tanzania

Chigongwe Kata ya Chigongwe
- Ward
- Location within Tanzania
- Coordinates: 6.060553°S 35.544999°E
- Country: Tanzania
- Region: Dodoma Region
- District: Dodoma Urban
- Ward: Chigongwe

Government
  - MP: Antony Mavunde
  - Mayor: Professor Davis G. Mwamfupe
  - Councilor: Ruth Job Mwilliko

Population (2016)
  - Total: 7,913
- Time zone: UTC+3 (EAT)

Chigogwe is an administrative ward in the Dodoma Urban district of the Dodoma Region of Tanzania. In 2016 the Tanzania National Bureau of Statistics report there were 7,913 people in the ward, from 7,281 in 2012.
