= Mnadani =

Ward in Dodoma, Tanzania

Mnadani Kata ya Mnadani
- Ward
- Location within Tanzania
- Coordinates: 6.1279876°S 35.732643°E
- Country: Tanzania
- Region: Dodoma Region
- District: Dodoma Urban
- Ward: Mnadani

Government
  - MP: Antony Mavunde
  - Mayor: Professor Davis G. Mwamfupe
  - Councilor: Farida Issa Mbaruku

Population (2016)
  - Total: 15,621
- Time zone: UTC+3 (EAT)

Mnadani is an administrative ward in the Dodoma Urban district of the Dodoma Region of Tanzania. In 2016 the Tanzania National Bureau of Statistics reported there were 15,621 people in the ward, from 14,373 in 2012.
