= Dodoma Makulu =

Ward in Dodoma, Tanzania

Dodoma Makulu Kata ya Dodoma Makulu
- Ward
- Location within Tanzania
- Country: Tanzania
- Region: Dodoma Region
- District: Dodoma Urban
- Ward: Dodoma Makulu

Government
  - MP: Antony Mavunde
  - Mayor: Professor Davis G. Mwamfupe
  - Councilor: Samuel Musaku Mziba

Population (2016)
  - Total: 18,582
- Time zone: UTC+3 (EAT)

Dodoma Makulu is an administrative ward in the Dodoma Urban district of the Dodoma Region of Tanzania. In 2016 the Tanzania National Bureau of Statistics report there were 18,582 people in the ward, from 17,097 in 2012.
