= Ntyuka =

Ward in Tanzania

Ntyuka Kata ya Ntyuka
- Ward
- Location within Tanzania
- Coordinates: 6.22288°S 35.75634°E
- Country: Tanzania
- Region: Dodoma Region
- District: Dodoma Urban
- Ward: Ntyuka
- Established: 1984
- Seat: Dodoma

Government
  - Type: Dodoma District Council
  - Leadership: Leader & Cabinet
  - MP: Antony Mavunde
  - Mayor: Professor Davis G. Mwamfupe
  - Councilor: Theobalt Emanuel Maina

Area
  - Total: 46.68 km^{2} (18.02 sq mi)
- Elevation: 1,237 m (4,058 ft)

Population (2012)
  - Total: 4,954
  - Density: 106.1/km^{2} (274.9/sq mi)
- Time zone: EAT
- Postcode: 41xxx
- Area code: 026
- Website: District Website

Ntyuka, is a administrative ward in Dodoma Urban in the Dodoma Region of Tanzania. The ward covers an area of 46.68 square kilometres (18.02 sq mi) with an average elevation of 1,237 metres (4,058 ft).

In 2016 reports there were 4,954 people in the ward, from 4,558 in 2012. The ward has 110 inhabitants per square kilometre (280/sq mi).
