= Hombolo Makulu =

Ward in Dodoma, Tanzania

Hombolo Makulu Kata ya Hombolo Makulu
- Ward
- Location within Tanzania
- Country: Tanzania
- Region: Dodoma Region
- District: Dodoma Urban
- Ward: Hombolo Makulu

Government
  - MP: Antony Mavunde
  - Mayor: Professor Davis G. Mwamfupe
  - Councilor: Yoram Jacob Lemanya

Population (2016)
  - Total: 9,659
- Time zone: UTC+3 (EAT)

Hombolo Makulu is an administrative ward in the Dodoma Urban district of the Dodoma Region of Tanzania. In 2016 the Tanzania National Bureau of Statistics report there were 9,659 people in the ward.
