= Miyuji =

Ward in Dodoma, Tanzania

Miyuji Kata ya Miyuji
- Ward
- Location within Tanzania
- Coordinates: 6.125359°S 35.76109318°E
- Country: Tanzania
- Region: Dodoma Region
- District: Dodoma Urban
- Ward: Miyuji

Government
  - MP: Antony Mavunde
  - Mayor: Professor Davis G. Mwamfupe
  - Councilor: David William Mgongo

Population (2016)
  - Total: 16,264
- Time zone: UTC+3 (EAT)

Miyuji is an administrative ward in the Dodoma Urban district of the Dodoma Region of Tanzania. In 2016 the Tanzania National Bureau of Statistics report there were 16,264 people in the ward, from 14,965 in 2012.

In 2022 the Census reported a population of 36,588; 17,531 males and 19,057 females. The number of household are 10,378.
