= Kizota =

Ward in Dodoma, Tanzania

Kizota Kata ya Kizota
- Ward
- Location within Tanzania
- Coordinates: 6.1465307°S 35.7022599°E
- Country: Tanzania
- Region: Dodoma Region
- District: Dodoma Urban
- Ward: Kizota

Government
  - Type: Dodoma District Council
  - Leadership: Leader & Cabinet
  - MP: Antony Mavunde
  - Mayor: Professor Davis G. Mwamfupe
  - Councilor: Paul Jamal Ngalya

Population (2016)
  - Total: 14,520
- Time zone: UTC+3 (EAT)

Kizota is an administrative ward in the Dodoma Urban district of the Dodoma Region of Tanzania. In 2016 the Tanzania National Bureau of Statistics report there were 14,520 people in the ward, from 34,453 in 2012.
