= Mayor of Dodoma =

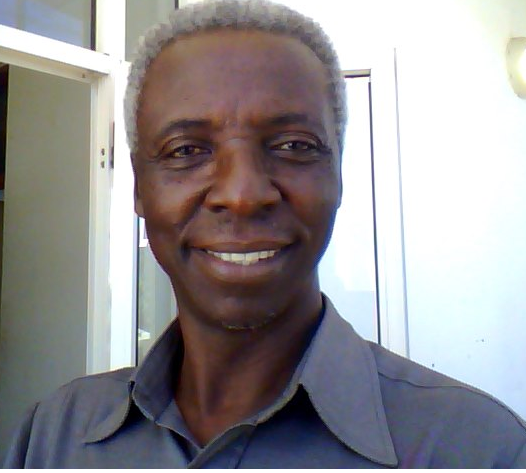
- Incumbent; Davis G. Mwamfupe since July 1, 2016
- Style: His Honor
- Term length: Three years renewable

The Mayor of Dodoma is the head of the municipal government of Dodoma, the capital city of Tanzania. The current mayor is Davis G. Mwamfupe, who took office on 1 July 2016. The City Council members elect the mayor. The Mayor is selected for a three-year term and can be re-elected at a local government election, or may be chosen from within the council at a meeting.

During a ceremony to celebrate the union of Tanganyika and Zanzibar, the first to happen outside of Dar es Salaam since the establishment of the Union in 1964, the President of the United Republic of Tanzania, Dr. John Magufuli, indicated that Dodoma Municipality would be promoted to Dodoma City. The incumbent Mayor of Dodoma Municipality, Professor Davis G. Mwamfupe, was thus promoted to Mayor of Dodoma City. Eight mayors served the municipal government before this change, including Mr. Mwamfupe.

== Dodoma as the Capital of Tanzania ==
On 1 October 1973, after a nationwide referendum, the Tanzanian government announced that the capital would be moved from Dar es Salaam to a more central location to encourage growth in the region, as well as to provide a more geographically central location for the capital. The cost was estimated at £186 million, and the move was expected to take ten years. The site, the Dodoma region, had been looked at as a potential new capital as early as 1915 by the (then) colonial power Germany; in 1932 by the British as a League of Nations mandate; and again in the post-independence National Assembly in 1961 and 1966.

The Capital Development Authority (CDA) invited three international firms to submit proposals for the best location and preparation of a master plan: Project Planning Associates Ltd., of Canada; Doxiadis Associates International, of Greece (who had worked on Pakistan’s new capital of Islamabad); and Engineering Consulting Firms Association of Japan. A fourth firm from Germany submitted a proposal without invitation. The winner, decided by the CDA together with independent American consultants, was Project Planning Associates. Their plan envisioned a city of 400,000 persons by 2000 and 1.3 million by 2020. In 1974, Dodoma had a population of 40,000. The existing population size was not seen as an impediment while existing infrastructure would reduce construction costs.

As part of the move of the government, a capitol complex was envisioned, and multiple designs by different international teams offered competing versions of the layout of a capitol complex. These competing proposals, some paid for by foreign governments as a form of aid, and others by the firms involved were presented as early as 1978. However, it was not until 2006 that the Chinese government delivered a finished parliament building in Dodoma. The final location of the parliament is not where the plan initially prescribed; the intended site is now being developed at the University of Dodoma.

As much of the initial design never came to fruition over the past 40 years, government offices and embassies resisted moving their offices to Dodoma. As a result, many government offices remain in Dar es Salaam, which is the commercial and de facto capital.

== Current mayor ==
Colour key
(for political parties)
Chama Cha Mapinduzi

Name	Portrait	Term of office		Elected	Political party	Previous and concurrent occupations
Davis G. Mwamfupe		2016	2020	9 July 2016	CCM	Professor

Mwamfupe was first appointed a Councillor on 23 June 2017. On 20 July 2017, he was officially elected as a Mayor of Dodoma Municipal Council.

== Current deputy mayor ==
Deputy Mayor	Portrait	Term of office		Elected	Political party	Previous and concurrent occupations
Jumanne Salum Ngede		2016	2020	9 July 2016	CCM	Businessman

== List of former mayors of Dodoma ==
Eight mayors served the municipal government of Dodoma from 1980 to the present day, including Mr. Mwamfupe. The table below details their names, the duration of their service, and their dates of birth:

Name	Mayoral term	Date of birth
FS Lebana	1980–1984	
ZM Massi	1984–1994	
Peter Mavynde	1994–2001	
GY Cheti	1994–2001	
FB Mazanda	2006–2010	
ES Mwiliko	1994–2001	
JM Mwanyemba	2015–2015	
Davis G. Mwamfupe	2016–2018	September 27, 1956 (age 69)

== See also ==
- Dodoma Region
- History of Dodoma
