= Ipagala =

Ward in Dodoma, Tanzania

Ipagala Kata ya Ipagala
- Ward
- Location within Tanzania
- Coordinates: 6.134563°S 35.77748°E
- Country: Tanzania
- Region: Dodoma Region
- District: Dodoma Urban
- Ward: Ipagala

Government
  - MP: Antony Mavunde
  - Mayor: Professor Davis G. Mwamfupe
  - Councilor: Dotto Kamuli Gombo

Population (2016)
  - Total: 19,722
- Time zone: UTC+3 (EAT)

Ipagala is an administrative ward in the Dodoma Urban district of the Dodoma Region of Tanzania. In 2016 the Tanzania National Bureau of Statistics report there were 19,722 people in the ward, from 18,146 in 2012.
