= Hazina =

Ward in Dodoma, Tanzania

- Ward
- Location within Tanzania
- Coordinates: 6.18196°S 35.75486°E
- Country: Tanzania
- Region: Dodoma Region
- District: Dodoma Urban
- Ward: Hazina
- Seat: Dodoma

Government
  - Type: Dodoma District Council
  - Leadership: Leader & Cabinet
  - MP: Antony Mavunde
  - Mayor: Professor Davis G. Mwamfupe
  - Councilor: Pascal Muhembano Matula

Area
  - Total: 8.584 km^{2} (3.314 sq mi)

Population (2012)
  - Total: 7,205
  - Density: 839.4/km^{2} (2,174/sq mi)
- Time zone: EAT
- Postcode: 41xxx
- Area code: 027
- Website: District Website

Hazina is an administrative ward in the Dodoma Urban district of the Dodoma Region of Tanzania. The ward covers an area of 8.584 square kilometres (3.314 sq mi).

In 2016 reports there were 7,205 people in the ward, from 9,540 in 2012, and 11,717 in 2002. The ward has 840 inhabitants per square kilometre (2,200/sq mi).
