= Kilimani, Dodoma Municipal Council =

Kilimani
- Ward
- Location within Tanzania
- Coordinates: 6.200795°S 35.743364°E
- Tanganyika: Tanzania
- Administrative Wards: Kilimani
- Seat: Dodoma

Government
  - Type: Dodoma District Council
  - Leadership: Leader & Cabinet
  - MP: Antony Mavunde
  - Mayor: Professor Davis G. Mwamfupe
  - Councilor: Neema Petro Mwaluko
- Time zone: UTC+03 (Greenwich Mean Time)
  - Summer (DST): UTC+03

Kilimani is an administrative ward in the Dodoma Urban district of the Dodoma Region of Tanzania. In 2016 the Tanzania National Bureau of Statistics report there were 7,033 people in the ward, from 7,237 in 2012.
