= Dodoma Municipal Council =

District of Dodoma Region, Tanzania

Dodoma Municipal Council Halimashauri ya Manispaa ya Dodoma (Swahili)
- District of Dodoma
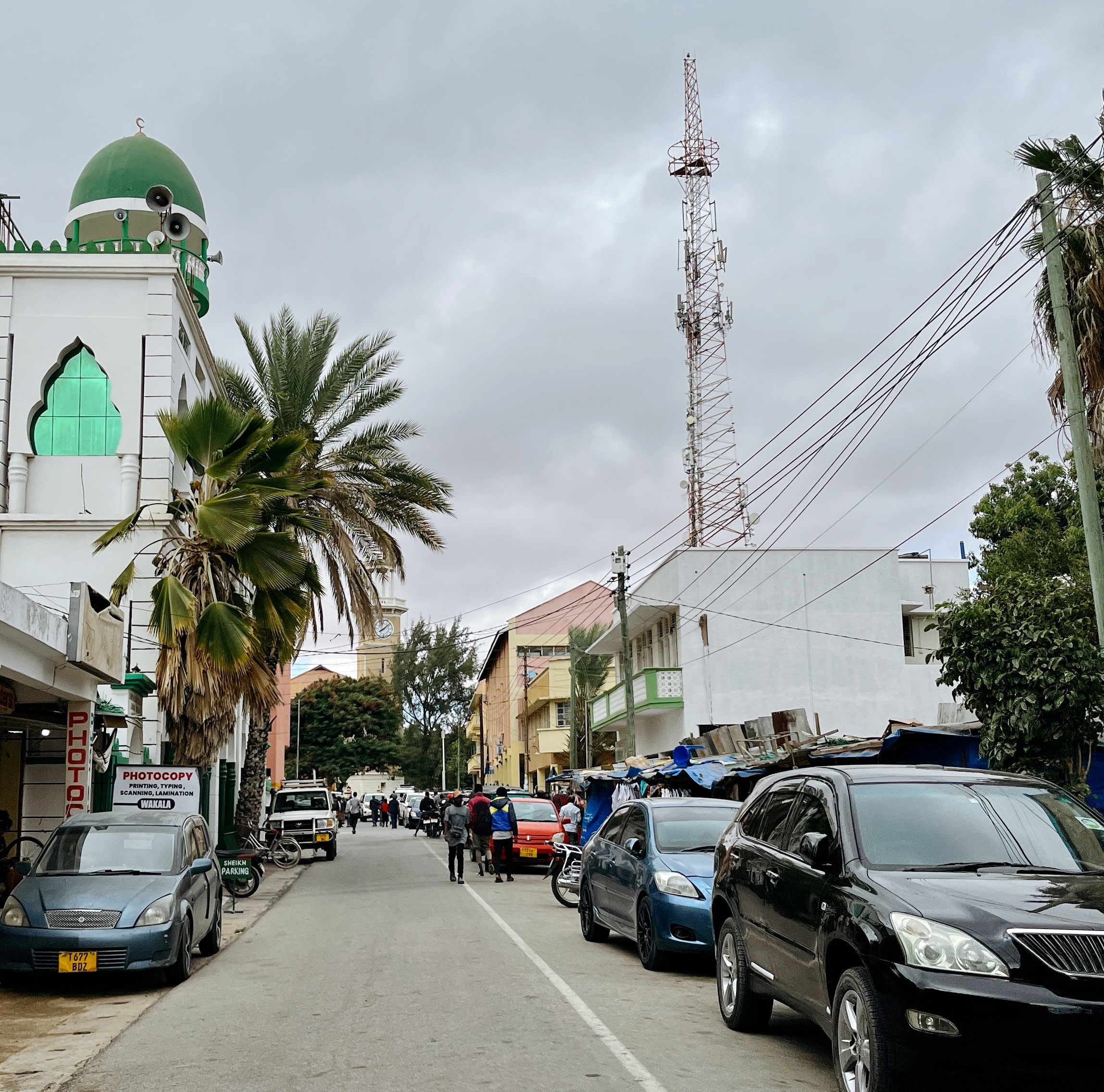
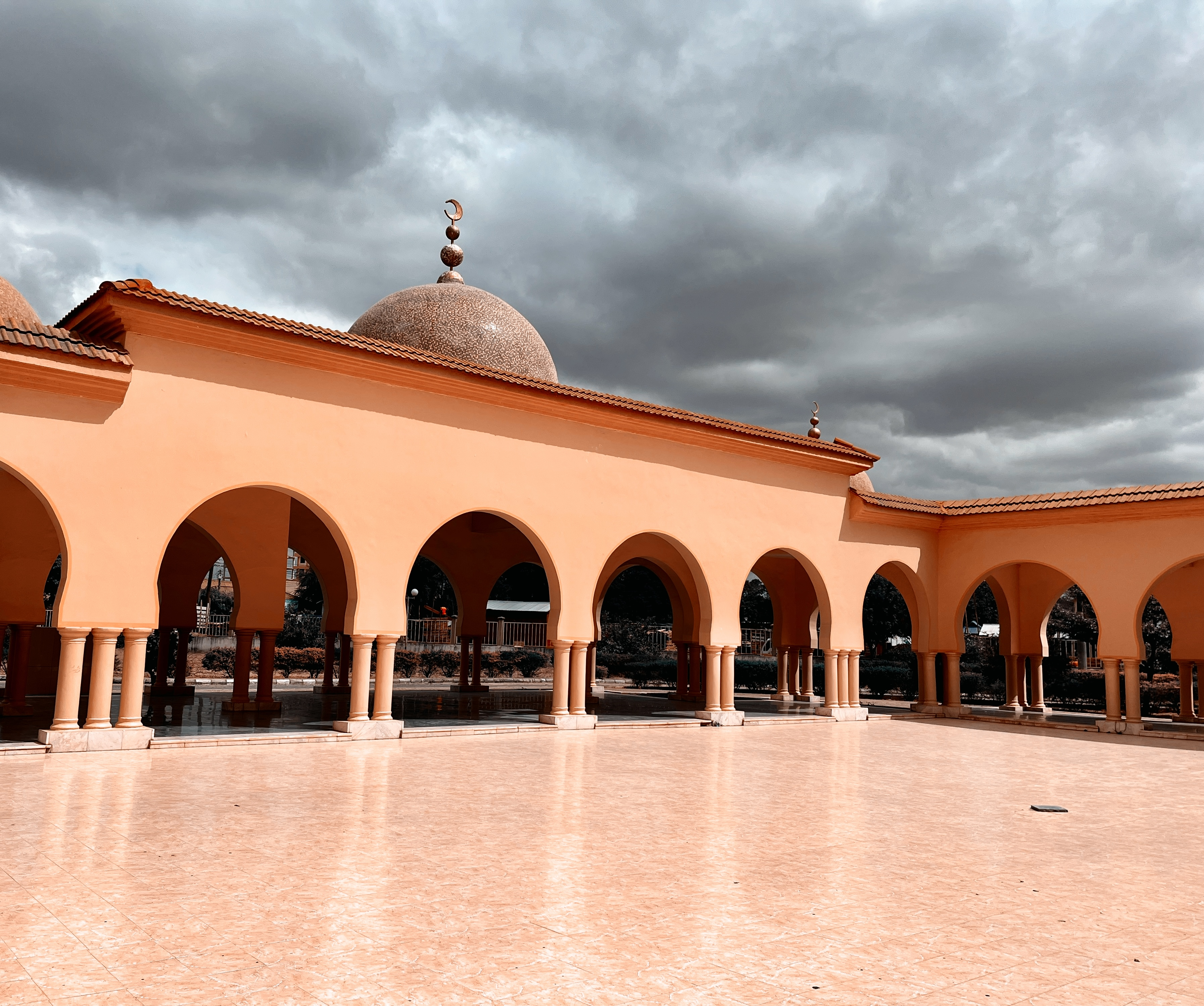
- From top to bottom: Street scene in Dodoma City, Julius Nyerere Statue in Nyerere Square & Dodoma Grand Mosque
- Nickname: The Capital City
- Dodoma Municipal Council in Dodoma Region
- Coordinates: 6°6′46.44″S 35°49′40.8″E
- Country: Tanzania
- Region: Dodoma Region
- District: 1980
- Headquarters: Dodoma

Area
  - District of Dodoma: 2,607 km^{2} (1,007 sq mi)

Population (2022 census)
  - District of Dodoma: 765,179
  - Density: 293.5/km^{2} (760.2/sq mi)
  - Urban: 765,179

Ethnic groups
  - Settler: Swahili
  - Native: Gogo
- Time zone: UTC+3 (EAT)
- Tanzanian Postcode: 411
- Website: Official website
- Symbols of Tanzania
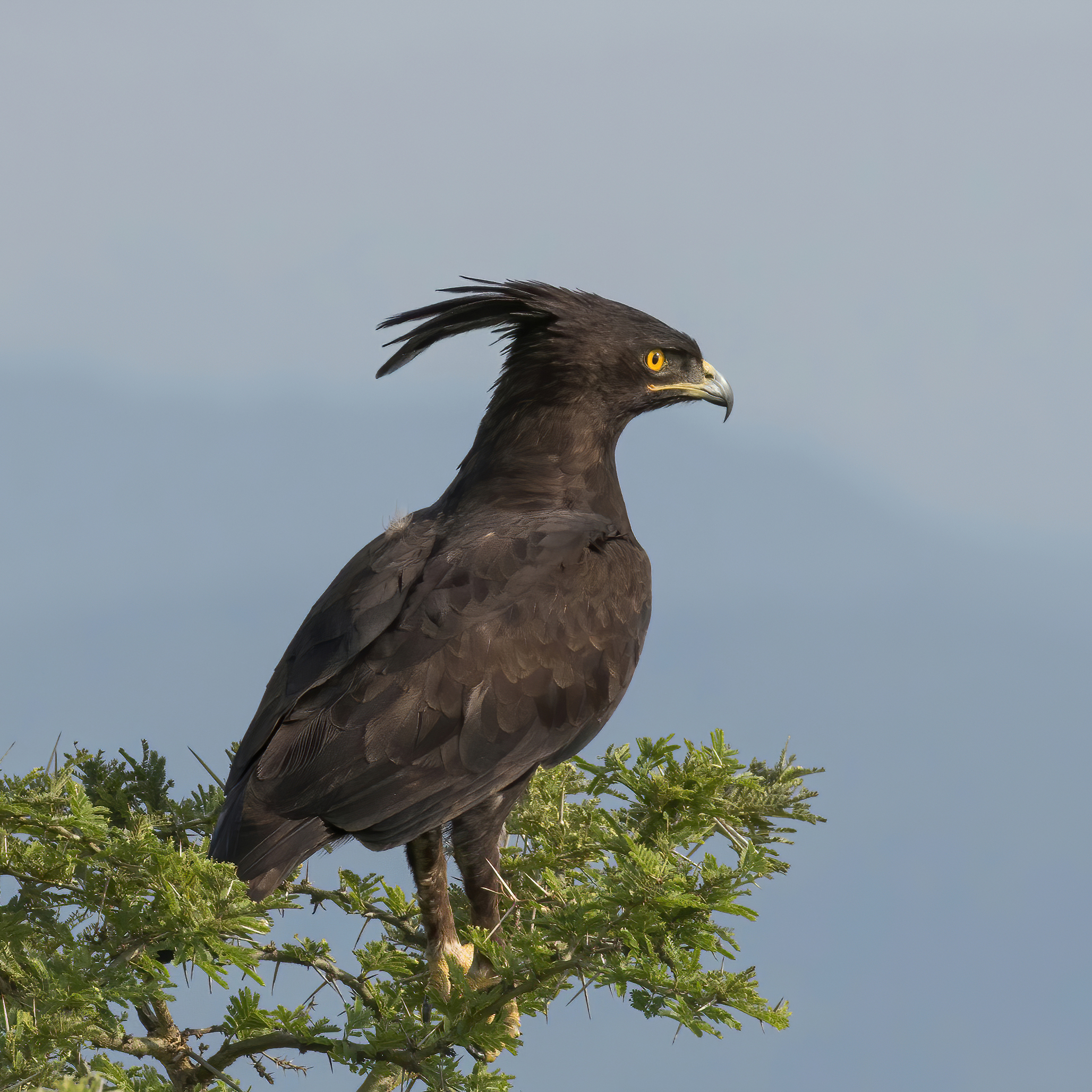
- Bird: Long-crested eagle

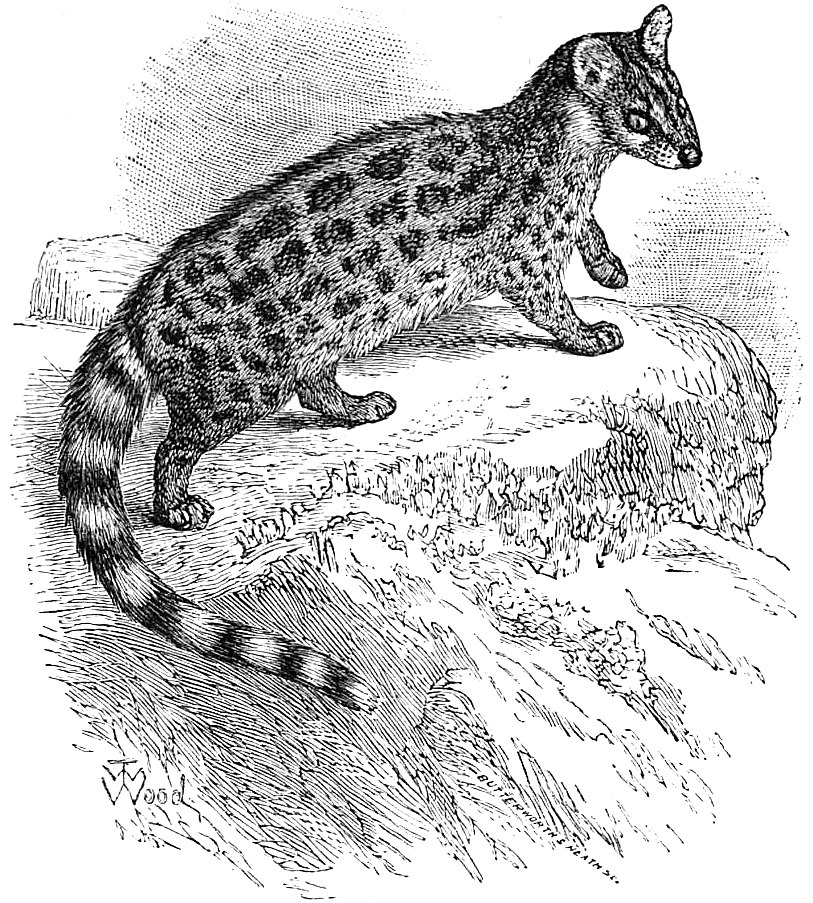
- Mammal: Common genet

Dodoma City District, officially the Dodoma Municipal Council (Halimashauri ya Manispaaa ya Dodoma, in Swahili) is one of seven districts of the Dodoma Region of Tanzania. It is bordered to the west by Bahi District, and to the east by Chamwino District. It covers an area of 2,607 km^{2} (1,007 sq mi). The district is comparable in size to the land area of Luxembourg. Its administrative seat is the city of Dodoma, also the legislative capital of Tanzania. The 2012 National Tanzania Census states the population for the district as 410,956.

== Administration ==
The administrative divisions of the Dodoma Municipality are 4 divisions, 37 wards, 39 villages, 100 Mitaa, and 222 hamlets. There is only one electoral district, Dodoma Urban. The chief executive of the council is the Council Executive Director (DED), who is chosen by the Minister in charge of Local Government. The MD of the Council is assisted by 13 department heads (see Table 11). There are 2,731 employees overall at the Council, of which 737 (27%) are men and 1994 (73%) are women.

As of 2016, Dodoma Urban District was administratively divided into 41 wards.

=== Wards ===
- Chahwa
- Chamwino
- Chan'gombe
- Chigongwe
- Chihanga
- Dodoma Makulu
- Hazina
- Hombolo Makulu
- Hombolo Bwawani
- Ihumwa
- Ipagala
- Ipala
- Iyumbu
- Kikombo
- Kikuyu Kaskazini
- Kikuyu Kusini
- Kilimani
- Kiwanja cha ndege
- Kizota
- Madukani
- Majengo
- Makole
- Makutupora
- Matumbulu
- Mbabala
- Mbalawala
- Miyuji
- Mkonze
- Mnadani
- Mpunguzi
- Msalato
- Mtumba
- Nala
- Ngh'ongh'onha
- Nkuhungu
- Ntyuka
- Nzuguni
- Tambukareli
- Uhuru
- Viwandani
- Zuzu

=== Government ===
The city is home to seven political parties: CCM, CHADEMA, CUF, UPDP, NCCR-MAGEUZI, UDP, and TLP. The Council is represented by democratic elections. There are 50 councilors total in the city, of whom 13 are selected by the National Election Commission (women special seats) and 37 are elected from wards. There are 100 Mitaa' and 39 settlements. There are 222 hamlets as well. A key figure is the mayor, who also chairs full council meetings. The Council Executive Director (MD) serves as the Full Council's chief executive and secretary. According to Act No. 7 of Local Governments Authorities of 1982, the Full Council has the last say and the authority to make decisions.

Development tax, livestock tax, crops tax, market levies, auction levies, and other levies are major sources of revenue for the council. Business license, alcohol levy, hunting fees, and other fees were derived from the council's holdings and assets.

== Geography ==
=== Climate ===
In the semiarid region of Dodoma Municipality, there is a clear seasonal rainfall pattern, with a long dry season lasting from late April to late November and a brief wet season lasting from late November to the end of April. The annual average rainfall is between 550 and 600 mm, but there have been extremes like 365.7 mm (2005) and 743.3 mm (2000). During the following months after, uni-modal rain season prevails across the majority of the Council. The region also has little rainfall, and what little rain does fall there is typically unpredictable and related to changes in temperature. In July, the average temperature is 20°C, while in November, it is around 30°C. The Council typically experiences both hot and cold weather. 13°C is the lowest temperature, and 31°C is the highest.

=== Geology ===
The Municipal is located on an upland plateau with attractive stony hills like Imagi, Isanga, Mkalama, and Mlimwa, which is between 900 and 1000 meters above sea level. These mountains are also referred to as inselbergs. The soil of the Dodoma Municipality is regarded as having a soil that is of low fertility, a lack of organic matter, a moderate to bad permeability, a shallow depth, and a high salt content. of certain places, salt pans even develop beneath the top soil. The soils are reddish-brown or black loam sand clay, sand loam, and clay.

There are many valleys, hills, and gullies in the Dodoma Municipality. Hills like Chigongwe, Mahungu, Lugala, and Nala are some examples. Additionally, it is observed that between hills, there are flat places where water frequently collects during the rainy season, resulting in the formation of seasonal streams. For instance, Chihoni in the council's western region supplies water to Segu, Nala, Chihoni, and Ilamba dams.

The Council does not have any permanent rivers; instead, it has seasonal streams and gullies that, when it rains, collect water from nearby hills to fill nearby swamps. When the rainy season arrives, these valleys are ideal for gardening. The majority of the current uses for the water from these gullies are domestic. Few people really utilize it for irrigation.

== Economy ==
=== Infrastructure ===
Paved trunk road T3 from Morogoro to Singida and paved trunk road T5 from Iringa to Babati pass through the district. The central railway of Tanzania passes through Dodoma Urban District as well and there is a train station in Dodoma.Dodoma Airport is located within Dododa Urban District as well. The council has a 524 km total network. Only 24.56 km (miles) of these are paved inside the town limits, 108 km (miles) are graveled, 384.6 km (miles) are gravel roads, and 390.7 km (miles) are earth roads.

==== Water and sanitation ====
In the Municipality, there are 40 communities, each with 34 deep wells, 80 shallow wells, 2 dams, 1 natural spring, and 5 wind turbines. There are 238,383 people who reside in rural areas overall, and 166,868 of them have access to clean, safe water. Through their donations, the community itself operates these water management programs.

The Mzakwe Basin is used to supply subterranean water to Dodoma Municipality. The distance from Dodoma town to this basin is 30 kilometers. 72,000m3 of water might be produced daily by the basin. However, the current infrastructure can only produce 40,000 m3 per day, whereas the daily water use is 21,000 m3. Only eight of the 21 (100–130 m deep) boreholes in this basin are active each day. Only 14 of the 54 pumps in the water delivery system are in use, and there are 12 boaster stations. In Kilimani, there are water storage tanks with a 72,000 m3 capacity.

Water can be provided by DUWASA (Dodoma Urban Water and Sanitation Authority) to up to 80% of the population. Currently, DUWASA provides service to around 15,500 clients in 17 zones. Currently, Lazo, Kisasa, Ipagala, Mwangaza, Chidachi, Nkuhungu, and Chinangali are among the places without a consistent water supply. Future plans of DUWASA include replacing a 50 km water service line to increase water supply coverage of 108 km in various places and reduce water loss, which is roughly 30%. 3,200 consumers are connected to the system's 52 km-long network of sewage treatment facilities. 42,300 persons can be served by the main tank sewage system.

=== Agriculture ===
All 41 of the Council's wards engage in some form of agriculture. Key cash crops include sorghum, sunflowers, and groundnuts; key food crops include millets, sorghum, maize, beans, etc. Dodoma Municipality's economy is primarily dependent on agriculture, livestock raising, and a few tiny small-scale companies in the District. More than 70% of the people living in the Council are employed in the agricultural industry. The majority of farmers practice subsistence farming, which results in limited production and thus low revenue. In rural wards of the Municipality, crop production is regarded as the most important economic activity and livestock raising as the second. Sunflower, Sesame seeds, groundnuts, tomatoes, and vine grapes are the main cash crops. The Municipal Council urges farmers to grow crops that can withstand droughts, particularly cassava, sorghum, and bulrush millet.

Traditional farming methods that mainly rely on rain-fed, local farmers' knowledge and experience dominate agricultural production in the Municipality. With the exception of a few areas like Vilonje, Zuzu, Gawaye, and Mkoyo, irrigation plans are quite unusual. After the rainy season, green vegetables, tomatoes, and egg plants are grown in these locations. The program aids farmers in making money. In general, farmers only produce enough food to meet their basic needs. This is partly due to the use of subpar farming equipment, including hand hoes for tilling the soil. Some people who live in Dodoma town have farms in Makutupora, Kibaigwa, and other far-off locations where maize is grown extensively. However, grapes are a significant income crop in the Municipal. The three wards of Mpunguzi, Hombolo, and Mbabala are the primary grape-growing regions.

=== Industry ===
Small-scale industries, including 9 enterprises producing refined cooking oils and 1 industry producing chalks. The above-mentioned output volumes have made a considerable contribution to the creation of jobs and to Council revenues. The residents of Dodoma Municipal Council are thought to earn an average of 170 US dollars a year. This circumstance demonstrates that many members of this Council are living in poverty and that we will make significant progress once we are able to rise over the global poverty limit of US$750 per year.

=== Mining and fishing ===
There are various minerals in this Council. Gypsum, gold, and salt make up those minerals. These mining operations also involve the extraction of sand, stone, gravel, and other building materials. These tasks are carried out by artisanal miners utilizing hand tools. Fish products from the dam are not only consumed by the nearby villages of Hombolo, Ipala, and Zepisa but are also exported to the external markets, including the nearby Chamwino District. Fisheries activities take place in the Hombolo dam, and fishing is done at a small scale by artisanal fishermen for the purpose of providing food and earning an income.

== Environmental degradation ==
The Dodoma Municipality, along with the other Councils that make up the Dodoma region of Central Tanzania, has some of the worst issues of environmental degradation or diminished environmental production potential in the country. This was determined to be the result of the mass deforestation that is occurring in the Mpunguzi and Mbabala wards as part of a trend in the region. This issue has led to an overall decline in soil fertility, a decrease in tree species, and soil erosion. In Mpunguzi and Mbabala wards, where deforestation was found to be a serious problem, more than 70% of the surveyed households expressed their concern about the declining soil fertility in the area, the declining number of tree species, and the declining area covered by natural forest, according to the results of a survey conducted in the Council in 2006.

Deforestation has also been linked to the spread of settlement, the clearing of land for farming, and the harvesting of trees for charcoal and fuel. Each hector of land loses 100m3 of soil nutrients annually due to soil erosion. As a result, there is a severe food shortage that is widespread in the region overall. Other environmental issues included overgrazing in the Mbabala ward and Majengo and Viwandani wards' land degradation from municipal garbage.

In addition to the Council's efforts, NGOs like World Vision Tanzania ADP, DONET, and DODEA have been advocating for tree planting in the region in order to preserve the ecology. Some of them, such as MIGESADO, also promoted the adoption of better stoves to reduce the need for fuel wood and so enhance environmental preservation. Drought and floods, both of which are characterized by accelerated run-off and dam failure, were frequent environmental dangers in the region. According to municipal statistics, there were severe droughts between 1994–1995 and 2005–2006 that resulted in crop loss and livestock deaths, which again led to a lack of food and cash crops.

== Health and Education ==
=== Health ===
The government, non-governmental organizations, as well as an increasing number of commercial pharmacies and dispensaries, offer health services in the Dodoma Municipality. To lower maternal and newborn mortality rates and control the spread of HIV infection and AIDS, the Municipal has mobile clinics that often operate during regional and national immunization campaigns. The Council now has a total of 56 outreach and mobile clinics, 4 special clinics, 51 dispensaries, 6 health centers, 4 hospitals, and 6 parastatal institutions.

Due to the lack of a hospital for the Council, Dodoma Regional Hospital (General Hospital) functions as the hospital for the Dodoma Municipal Council, which causes overcrowding of patients there. A Council Hospital is being built, and in the financial year 2009–10, TZS. 80,000,000.00 was set aside for preliminary work, namely surveying and designing. Additionally, a special request in the amount of 1.5 billion TZS has been made in the budget for 2010–2011, along with the preliminary acquisition of land anticipated to be 8 hectares.

=== Education ===
There are 106 primary schools under Dodoma Municipal Council. 92 of them are public schools, and 14 are privately owned. 50 secondary schools are operated by the Dodoma Municipal Council, 36 of which are public or community-owned and 14 are private. There are 36 public secondary schools, 3 of which are boarding schools (boarding schools include Bihawana, Dodoma, and Msalato Girls Secondary School), and the remainder are day schools.

== Notable persons from Dodoma MC ==
- Norman Chihota, Sprinter National record in 100m
