= Kiwanja cha Ndege =

Ward in Dodoma, Tanzania

Kiwanja cha Ndege Kata ya Kiwanja cha Ndege
- Ward
- Location within Tanzania
- Coordinates: 6.16165113°S 35.750414566°E
- Country: Tanzania
- Region: Dodoma Region
- District: Dodoma Urban
- Ward: Kiwanja cha Ndege

Population (2016)
  - Total: 11,009
- Time zone: UTC+3 (EAT)

Kiwanja cha Ndege is an administrative ward in the Dodoma Urban district of the Dodoma Region of Tanzania. In 2016 the Tanzania National Bureau of Statistics report there were 11,009 people in the ward, from 10,129 in 2012.
