= Gogo people =

Ethnic group from Dodoma Region of Tanzania

Gogo
Wagogo

Total population
- 1,300,000 (1992)

Regions with significant populations
- Tanzania Dodoma Region (Bahi District), (Dodoma District), (Chamwino District), (Kongwa District) & (Mpwapwa District)

Languages
- Gogo language & Swahili

Religion
- Christianity; African Traditional Religion; Islam

Related ethnic groups
- Maasai

- Person: Mgogo
- People: Wagogo
- Language: Kigogo

The Gogo, also known as Gongwe or Wagogo, are a Bantu ethnic group based in the Dodoma Region of central Tanzania. In 1992, the Gogo population was estimated to number 1,300,000.

== History ==
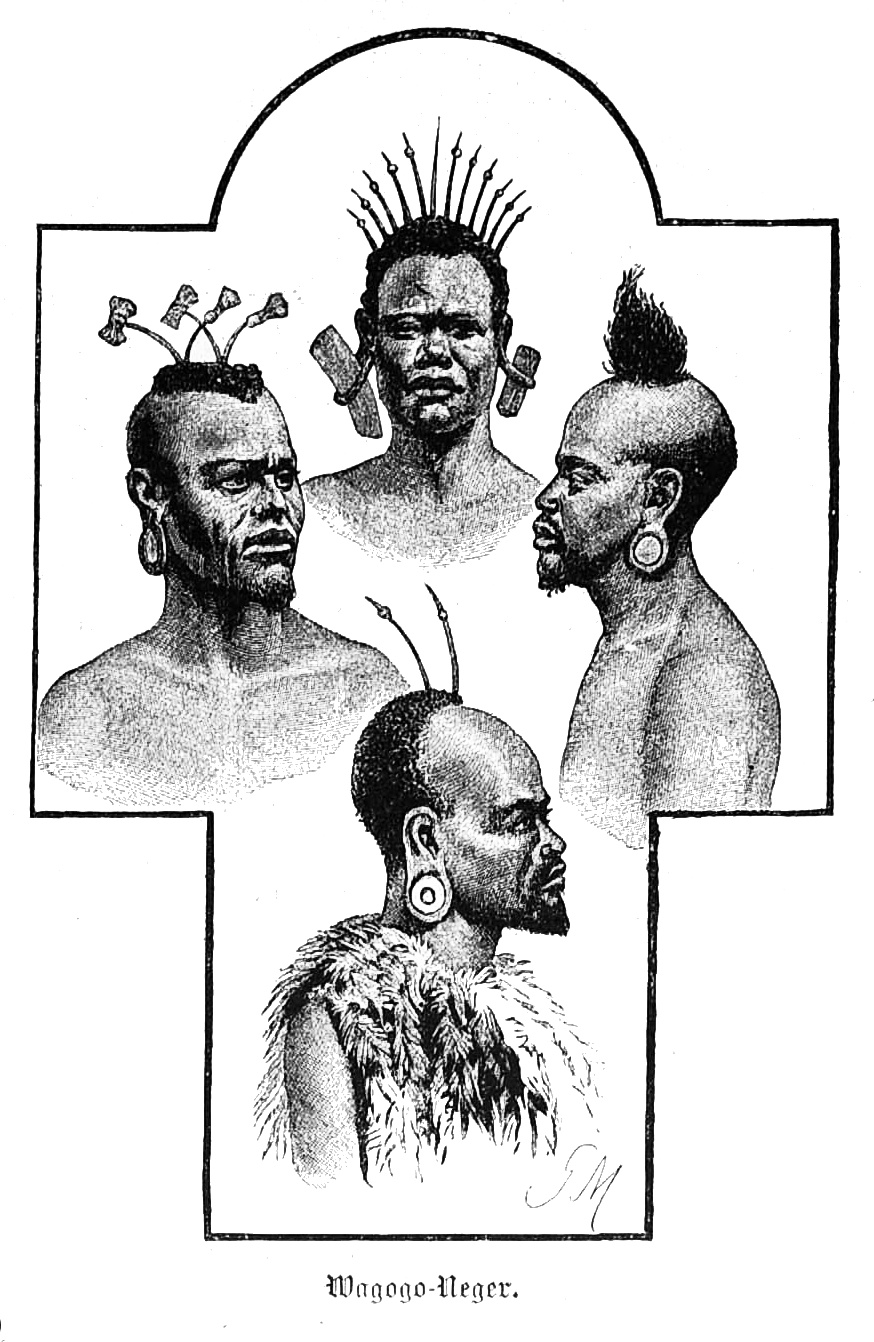
Gogo men's hairstyles (c.1894)

The Gogo had a long tradition of hunting and gathering, allowing the Nyamwezi to carry the ivory to the coast, but had become agriculturalists with cattle by 1890. They employed slave labor, and are said to have treated their agricultural slaves badly.

The Wagogo experienced famine in 1881, 1885, 1888–89 (just before Stokes' caravan arrived), 1894–95, and 1913–14. The main reason for the exceptional series of famines in Ugogo was its unreliable rainfall and the ensuing series of droughts.

Kimbu and Nyamwezi colonists gradually colonized the dry plains west and east of Ugogo, which travelers on the principal road most feared. Central Tanganyika saw the growth of Nyamwezi towns, and numerous Gogo chiefs had Nyamwezi advisors.

More people learned Swahili and were influenced by Islam through the caravan trade of the 19th century. It was commonly spoken by Sagara and Gogo in the 1850s, according to Burton, who also noted that "almost every inland tribe has some vagrant man who can speak it."

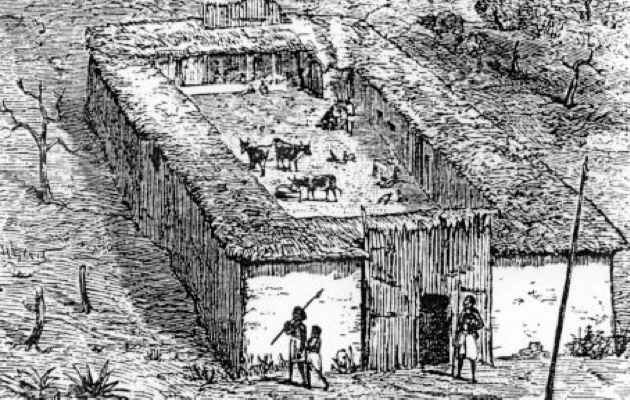
Tembe house built by the Gogo people, illustrated by H.M.Stanley 1872

=== Colonial era ===
During the European exploration of Tanzania, Ugogo was used as a route west. During such expeditions, a second column marched up the central caravan route towards the western plateau as Wissmann worked in the northeast. Emin Pasha, an eccentric Austrian doctor, served as its leader. He was given orders to "break or undermine Arab influence," build a German base on Lake Victoria, and be prepared to intervene in Burundi if necessary. Before he arrived, the Germans handed over control of Uganda to the British. Emin disregarded his orders and instead left "everything in chaos from Mpwapwa to Karagwe." He crossed Ugogo after leaving Bagamoyo in April 1890, razing 19 villages and stealing about 2,000 animals after an askari was killed as a result of a chief's demand for tolls.

After the German invasion of the 1880s, missionary efforts increased. The Holy Ghost Fathers, the eldest of the five already existing societies, expanded their mission from Bagamoyo's hinterland to Kilimanjaro (1891), Usambara (1907), and Ugogo (1910). In the 1890s, the White Fathers occupied the Rukwa valley, Usumbwa, and Buhaya. The next decade saw their expansion to Ufipa, Buha, Mbulu, and in the direction of Lake Nyasa from their initial bases in Karema, Tabora, and Bukumbi. The pace of Protestant societies was slower. Between Bonde and Uzigua, the UMCA expanded its operations. The CMS prioritized Uganda, giving up its station atop Mount Kilimanjaro and keeping only a little area in Ukaguru and Ugogo.

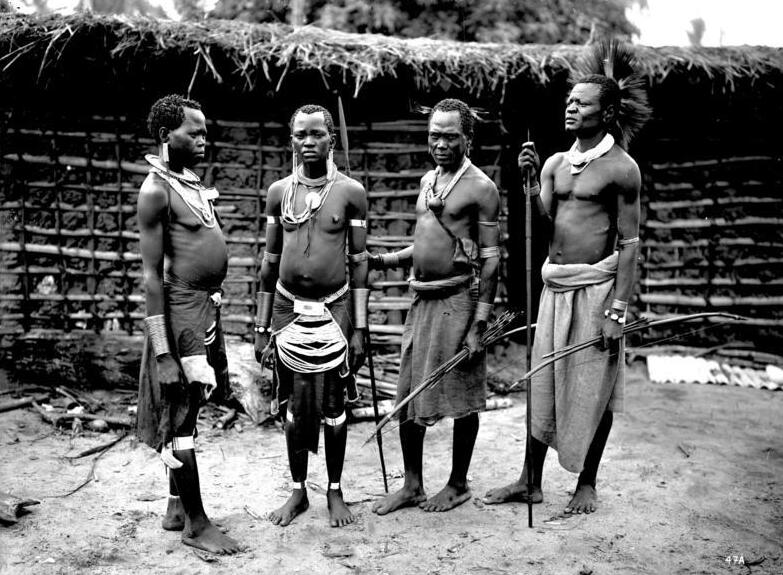
Wagogo (1906)

Eight teachers were dispatched to Uvidunda by the Roman Catholic community in Ilonga in 1910. They dispatched 39 Christians the following year to launch a mission in Kibakwe, and 14 more in 1912 to teach in Ugogo. Ugogo's proselytizing revealed the catechist's true worth. When the Roman Catholic mission there was established in 1909, catechists were chosen from all of the colony's more established mission locations. They opened 91 schools with 4,000 students in under five years.

One common memory of Tanzanians from the First World War was starvation. Food was in low supply in towns early in the battle as imports were stopped, military needs increased, and prices increased. Requisitioning and drought in 1915 caused a moderate famine in the Makonde plateau, the north-east, Ufiome, and parts of Ugogo and Ulanga. During 1916, the situation in these locations deteriorated. In the Masasi District near Luatala that year, 800 people died from famine. Labor required to cultivate land reduced as the demand for porters increased.

By 1917, both sides were systematically taking animals and destroying any grain they couldn't eat. They may have taken nearly a fifth of Tanganyika's four million livestock reserve for famine. In 1917, Lettow-Vorbeck left famine behind as he departed the Rufiji Valley, Mahenge, and the south. But this was just the start of the disaster. It arrived in 1918 and was particularly bad in the famine-prone regions of Dodoma, Kondoa, and Singida. The British district officer in Dodoma reported in December 1916 that "the entire District has been ransacked for cattle."

The British obtained an additional 5,659 animals in just five months, in addition to 24,000 porters and about 100 tonnes of grain, whereas the Germans had acquired 26,000 animals. Throughout 1917, requisitioning continued, although local officers denied any signs of calamity. It was explained that food was being forcedly collected because Gogo had no use for money, but people were "merely resigned" and famine was improbable. When the rains stopped in November 1917, the entire central region went through three years of mutunya (“scramble for food”, the worst famine in Gogo recorded history. According to one estimate, Dodoma district alone saw 30,000 deaths, which was nearly one in every five people. In the Dodoma market, people offered starving calves for sale for one shilling each. Many people fled the region.

The Central Province, particularly Ugogo and Uzigua, frequently suffered from starvation. In 1919–21, 1925–6, 1928–30, 1932–5, 1937, and 1939, Ugogo and Uzigua both had food shortages. Drought was the main factor in both regions, which was made worse by yearly infestations of locusts in the 1930s. Both Ugogo and Uzigua have a long history of hunger, extremely unpredictable rainfall, the ability to export grain in good years, and an inability or reluctance to grow crops that can withstand drought, such as manioc. While Ugogo was endangered by tsetse and purposefully cut off from territory matters by a conservative provincial commissioner, Uzigua had also lost its livestock reserve to the disease.

However, territorial hunger returned to Tanganyika in 1943. It started in Ugogo as normal and was mostly caused by drought; nevertheless, drought generates hunger when reserves are low, recuperative abilities are limited, outside assistance is difficult to obtain, and transportation and communications are broken. In each of these ways, the hunger was made more widespread, severe, and extended by the conflict. The government pushed the growing of drought-prone maize rather than drought-resistant millet and encouraged the export of food and animals for military use.

The Gogo endured more hardships in 1946. "Morale is high and it is felt that now that the war is over, the period of famine is over until the next war," their district officer stated the following year.

== Traditional society ==
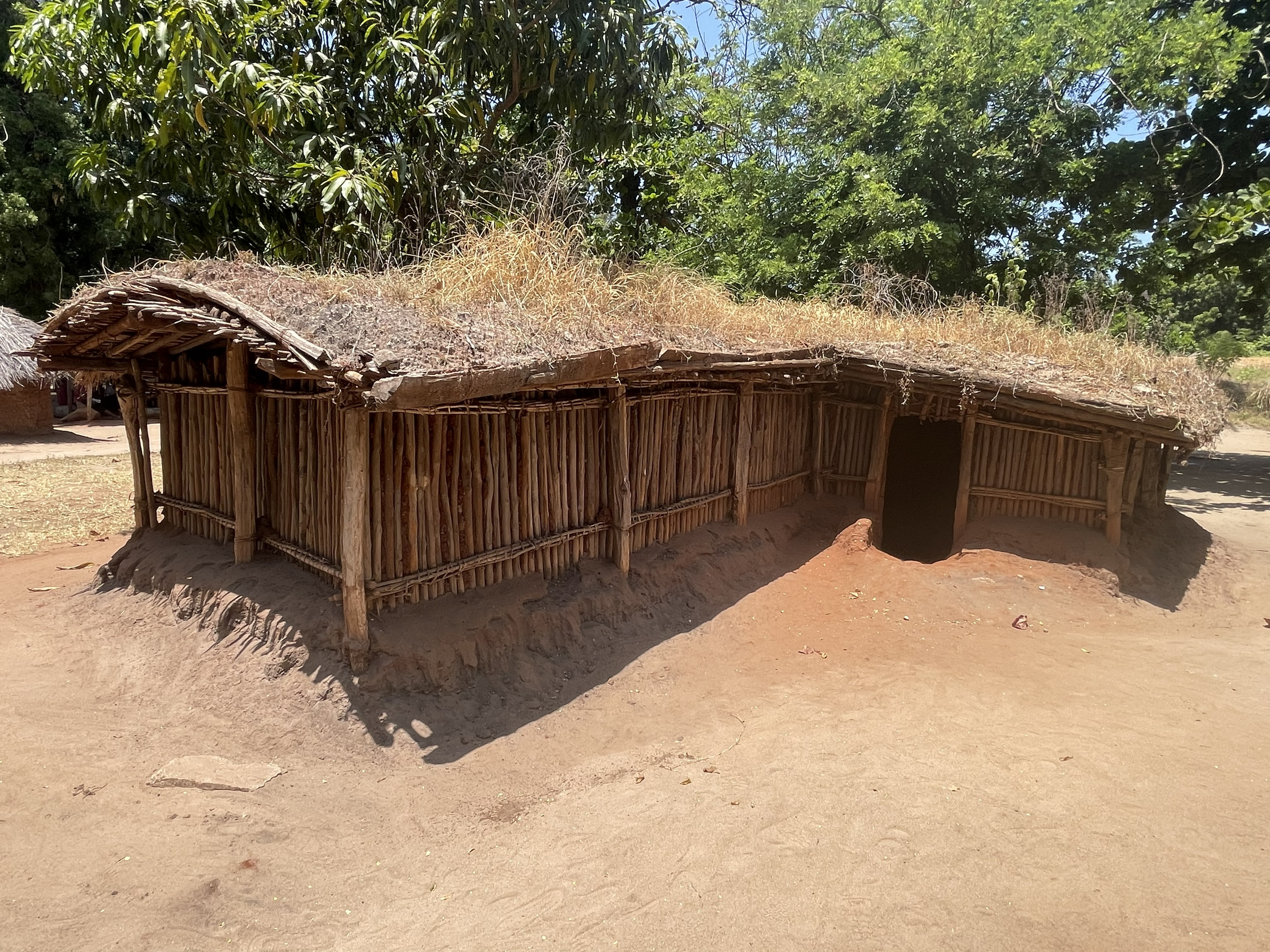
A traditional Gogo house that was used as a sleeping house.

=== Social structure ===
Wagogo clans moved many times in their history, dropping ties to older groupings, and evolving their own new links and family, clan names, affiliations, culture, customs, and ritual functions.

While early European writers emphasized the power of chiefs of the Wagogo, calling them 'Sultans' as was customary on the coast, and stressed their collection of the very profitable taxes (hongo) on scarce food and water, it was the ritual leaders who truly held the most power. They control rainmaking and fertility, provide medicines to protect against natural disasters or hazards, prevent overuse of certain resources, preside over circumcision and initiation ceremonies, give supernatural protection for all undertakings, and be arbitrators in homicide, witchcraft accusations, and serious assault. They were not to leave their "country”, but they were to be rich in cattle.

The Wagogo place considerable value on neighbourliness. After their physical needs met, a strange traveller would be accompanied many miles by the young men of a homestead in order to place him safely on his way. The homestead group was so fundamental to Gogo society that people who had died peculiarly (e.g. struck down by lightning or a contagious disease) were thrown into the bush or the trunk of a baobab tree, for such a person had no homestead and could become an "evil spirit" who associated with sorcerers or witches.

=== Family ===
Most brothers go to great lengths to assist their sisters, and often live with their sisters in sickness until they recover, for brothers have strong moral and legal obligations to fulfil these duties in cooperation with their sisters' husbands. Even later in life, sisters and brothers continue to visit each other, a wife never being fully incorporated into her husband's immediate family.

=== Marriage ===
While the majority of Wagogo have only one wife at any given time, polygyny is not uncommon for older, well-established men. A reasonably wealthy Wagogo man can often have two or three wives.

Most marriages take place within a day of walking distance after an agreement is reached on the number of livestock to be included in the bridewealth. To this day, bridewealth is still conventionally given entirely in livestock, and a high proportion of court cases involve the payment or return of the brideprice. Even after divorce, all children born during the marriage belong to the ex-husband, "where the cattle came from." "If you go somewhere and marry the child of others, then all your wife's relatives become your relatives, because you have married the child, and so you will love even them. (From Rigby's book "Cattle and Kinship") Lovers of married women could never, however, claim their offspring. If a husband had given the brideprice for his wife who was pregnant before he married her, he must still accept paternity of the child.

=== Defence ===
Defence against the Kisongo, Maasai, and Wahehe is organized and based on age groups of warriors, much like the Maasai. This organization is mostly used for local defence, though it can sometimes be used for cattle raids against others. When an alarm is sounded, all able-bodied men are to take up arms and run towards the call.

== Historical accounts ==
- In 1878, Edward Hore described them as "hongo squeezing Wagogo".
- The Germans greatly admired their physiques and cattle; otherwise they concurred with Emin Pasha, Henry Stanley, and Edward Hore. Thirty years later, the British also found the Wagogo to be "uninterested in progress."
- In his book In Darkest Africa Henry M. Stanley, while "rescuing" Emin Pasha in order to bring him to the coast, writes,

"On the 26th we entered Muhalala, and on the 8th of November we had passed through Ugogo. There is no country in Africa that has excited greater interest in me than this. It is a ferment of trouble and distraction, and a rat's nest of petty annoyances that beset travelers from day to day while in it. No natives know so well how to aggrieve and be unpleasant to travelers. One would think there was a school somewhere in Ugogo to teach low cunning and vicious malice to the chiefs, who are masters in foxy-craft. Nineteen years ago I looked at this land and people with desiring eyes. I saw in it a field worth some effort to reclaim. In six months I felt sure Ugogo could be made lovely and orderly, a blessing to the inhabitants and to strangers, without any great expense or trouble. It would become a pleasant highway of human intercourse with far-away peoples, productive of wealth to the natives, and a comfort to caravans. I learned on arrival in Ugogo that I was forever debarred from the hope. It is to be the destiny of the Germans to carry out this work, and I envy them. It is the worst news of all that I shall never be able to drain this cesspool of iniquitous passion, extinguish the insolence of Wagogo chiefs, and make the land clean, healthy, and even beautiful of view. While my best wishes will accompany German efforts, my mind is clouded with a doubt that it will ever be that fair land of rest and welcome I had dreamed of making it."

== Notable Gogo people ==
The Wagogo have produced numerous major figures in Tanzanian politics, culture, and society.

- Yohana Madinda, the first African bishop of Anglican Diocese of Central Tanganyika (1923–1989)
- Godfrey Mdimi Mhogolo, the longest-serving bishop of the Anglican Diocese of Central Tanganyika (1989–2014), first Tanzanian bishop to ordain women and champion their development in the church
- Hukwe Zawose (1938–2003), musician
- Mzee Mchoya Malogo, musician, leader of the Nyati group from Nzali
- John Mtangoo, musician
- John S. Malecela, politician and former Prime Minister
- Job Lusinde, politician and ambassador
- William Jonathan Kusila (MP), politician
- Hezekiah N. Chibulunje, former MP and former Deputy Minister
- John Chiligati, former MP and former Minister
- Fredrick Chiwanga, lecturer, diplomat, editor, translator and interpreter (French, English, Swahili, Kigogo), Sokoine University of Agriculture
- Mzee Pancras M. Ndejembi, politician
- Simon Chiwanga, retired bishop of Anglican Diocese of Mpwapwa and former Chair of the Anglican Consultative Council (ACC)
- Njamasi Chiwanga, academician and conservationist working at local environmental conservation NGO LEAD Foundation
- Patrick Balisidya, musician
- Simon Chiwanga, public health researcher with doctorate degree, tropical disease control expert, environmental management scientist, water sanitation and hygiene expert and activist, toxicology researcher, theologian of the Anglican Church of Tanzania, gospel musician; worked as Program Manager of Malaria and Child Health in PSI Tanzania, worked with Amref Health Africa as WASH Expert; currently he is the CEO of Chiwanga Enterprises Ltd, an Executive Director of the Integrated Rural Development Organization (IRDO), and the current Chairman of the Songwe River Basin Commission
- Kedmon Mapanha, Lecturer II, University of Dar es Salaam
- Ambassador Emmanuel Mbennah, accomplished academic with two doctorate degrees, former International Director for the Africa Region for TWR International, former Vice Chancellor of St John's University of Tanzania, former Tanzanian Ambassador to Zimbabwe and Mauritius.
- Palamagamba John Aidan Mwaluko Kabudi, professor of law and MP; he is a former Minister for Constitutional Affairs and Justice, and a former Minister for Foreign Affairs and East African Co-operation
- Christopher M. M. Nyamwanji, MBA from Mzumbe University, development facilitator, Chairman of SUDESO based in Tabora
- Emmanuel R. Chidong'oi, Founder and Managing Director - Tanzania Organization for Agricultural Development (TOfAD), a First President - Ecosystem Based Adaptation for Food Security Assembly (EBAFOSA)Tanzania and Coordinator - Eastern Africa Agriculture Practitioner's Organization (EAAPO), A Managing Director of Tanzania Initiative for Development Effectiveness (TIDE) and a Member of Global CSOs Partnership for Development Effectiveness - Working Group on Conflict and Fragility (CPDE - WGCF)
- Prof. Siza D. Tumbo, professor at Department of Crop Science and Horticulture at Sokoine University of Agriculture
- Frank P Menda, Lecturer II, University of Dodoma
- Bahati Richardson Chinyelle, ophthalmologist, accountant, financial analyst, translator (English, Swahili, Gogo), founder of YES I DO - Afrika (NGO), Co-founder and Board Chair of LAUBRINS International Co. Ltd, extensive experience with many local and international organizations including the WHO, HKI, GSM, SALT International, MoHSW-TZ, and more
- Benard Michael Paul Mnyang'anga, aka Ben Pol, musician
- Eng. Raphael Paschal Menda, Managing Director (MD) and Founder of COYESA Company Limited (http://www.coyesa.co.tz), which offers drilling works and borehole services, water resource infrastructure services, roadwork construction services, telecommunications infrastructure services, creative construction services, petrol station construction services, warehouse construction services, hydrology engineering, electrical works and services, mechanical works and services, land surveying, GIS and environmental consultancy services
- Titus Alfred Makudali Msagati, professor at the College of Science, Engineering, and Technology, University of South Africa (https://scholar.google.co.za/citations?user=4S59Ud8AAAAJ&hl=en; https://www.unisa.ac.za/sites/corporate/default/Colleges/Science,-Engineering-&-Technology/Research/Distinguished-Professors)
