= Anthony Mavunde =

Tanzanian politician (born 1984)

Honourable Anthony Peter Mavunde MP

Minister of Minerals
- Incumbent
- Assumed office 1 September 2023
- President: Samia Suluhu
- Preceded by: Doto Biteko

Deputy Minister for Labour, Youths and employment.
- In office October 2015 – 2020
- President: John Magufuli
- Minister: Jenista Mhagama
- Succeeded by: Patrobas Katambi

Member of Parliament
- Incumbent
- Assumed office 2015
- Constituency: Dodoma Urban

Personal details
- Born: 2 March 1984 (age 42) Dodoma Region, Tanzania
- Party: Chama Cha Mapinduzi
- Education: Mzumbe University; Dodoma University

Anthony Peter Mavunde (born 2 March 1984) is a Tanzanian politician who has been a member of the ruling party CCM since 2006. He is the current Minister of Minerals and a Member of Parliament.

== Background and education ==
Antony Peter Mavunde, Completed his Primary schooling in 1996, Secondary School at O Level 2003, A Level 2007, Mzumbe University 2000 where awarded LLB, School of Law for post graduate Diploma in Legal and practical training in 2010 and lastly at the Dodoma University in 2012.

== Career ==
He worked as a Chief Executive Officer in FEMATA company from 2013 to 2015. He has kept the office of a Managing Partner in RGK Law Chambers Advocates during the period of 2008–2015.

== Political career ==
Antony Peter Mavunde involved in politics while he was at Mzumbe University from 2006. And a Member of Chama Cha Mapinduzi was elected to the positions of member of Regional Executive Council UVCCM of Chama cha Mapinduzi. Antony Mavunde was also appointed National Chairman of International affairs of UVCCM and Labor Committee for Youth Wing and stayed in this post from 2008 to 2012. During the period of 2012-2017 he worked as a Member to the National Executive Council of Chama cha Mapinduzi party. From 2014 to 2017 Mavunde has kept the post of National Chairman to the International Affairs and Labor Committee- Youth Wing in his party. Since January 2022, Mavunde is Deputy Minister for Agriculture. In president Samia Suluhu Hassan's third cabinet reshuffle in September 2023, Mavunde, got his first major cabinet position, being appointed the Minister of Minerals.

Is a member of the Tanzanian Parliament for the first terms as elected on the general election in 2015 serving to 2020 representing community of Dodoma urban Constituency.
