= Davis G. Mwamfupe =

Mayor of Dodoma since 2017

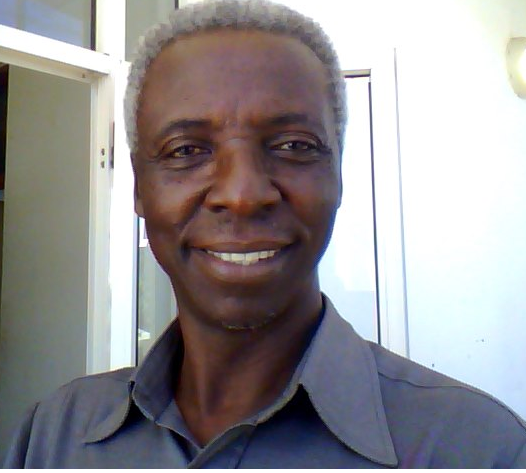
- Born: 27 September 1956 (age 70); Rungwe Mbeya in Tanganyika Territory
- Education: Dar es Salaam University (M.A.); Dar es Salaam University (BA); University of Glasgow (PhD)
- Scientific career
- Workplaces: University of Dar es Salaam; Dodoma University; Dar es Salaam University College of education; Dodoma Municipal Council

Davis George Mwamfupe (born September 27, 1956) is Mayor of Dodoma, the Capital City of The United Republic of Tanzania. He is a member of the CCM, and a professor at the Dodoma University. He also served at the University of Dar es Salaam from 2005 to 2008.

Mwamfupe was appointed a Councillor on 23 June 2017. On 20 July 2017 he was officially elected as the mayor of Dodoma Municipal Council.

== Academic Leadership ==
Work experience
Year	Position	Organization
1998–2000	Head, Department of Geography	University of Dar es Salaam
2005–2008	Dean, Faculty of art and Humanities	University of Dar es Salaam
2008–2009	Acting Dean	Dodoma University, School of Social Sciences
2009–2014	Dean	Dodoma University, School of Social Sciences

== Selected publications ==
- "The Role and Challenges of Social Networks as Survival Strategies in Agro-Pastoral Communities in Central Tanzania" Journal of Humanities (JH), Volume 3(1)2016, 52-62
- Briggs, John and Davis Mwamfupe (2000). “Peri-Urban Development in an Era of Structural Adjustment in Africa: The City of Dar es Salaam,” Urban Studies, 37(4): 797-809
- "Changing village land, labour and livelihoods :Rungwe and Kyela Districts, Tanzania" Afrika-Studiecentrum, 1998

== Memberships ==
Committees
Year	Position	Organization
2009–2014	Board member	Dodoma University Senate
2009–2014	Board member and Chairperson	School board (Social Science)
2009–2014	Board member	College Board
2017–present	Member, Mayor	University of Dodoma Council
