= Mount Kwaraha =

Mountain in Tanzania

Coordinates: 04°13′47″S 35°48′4″E

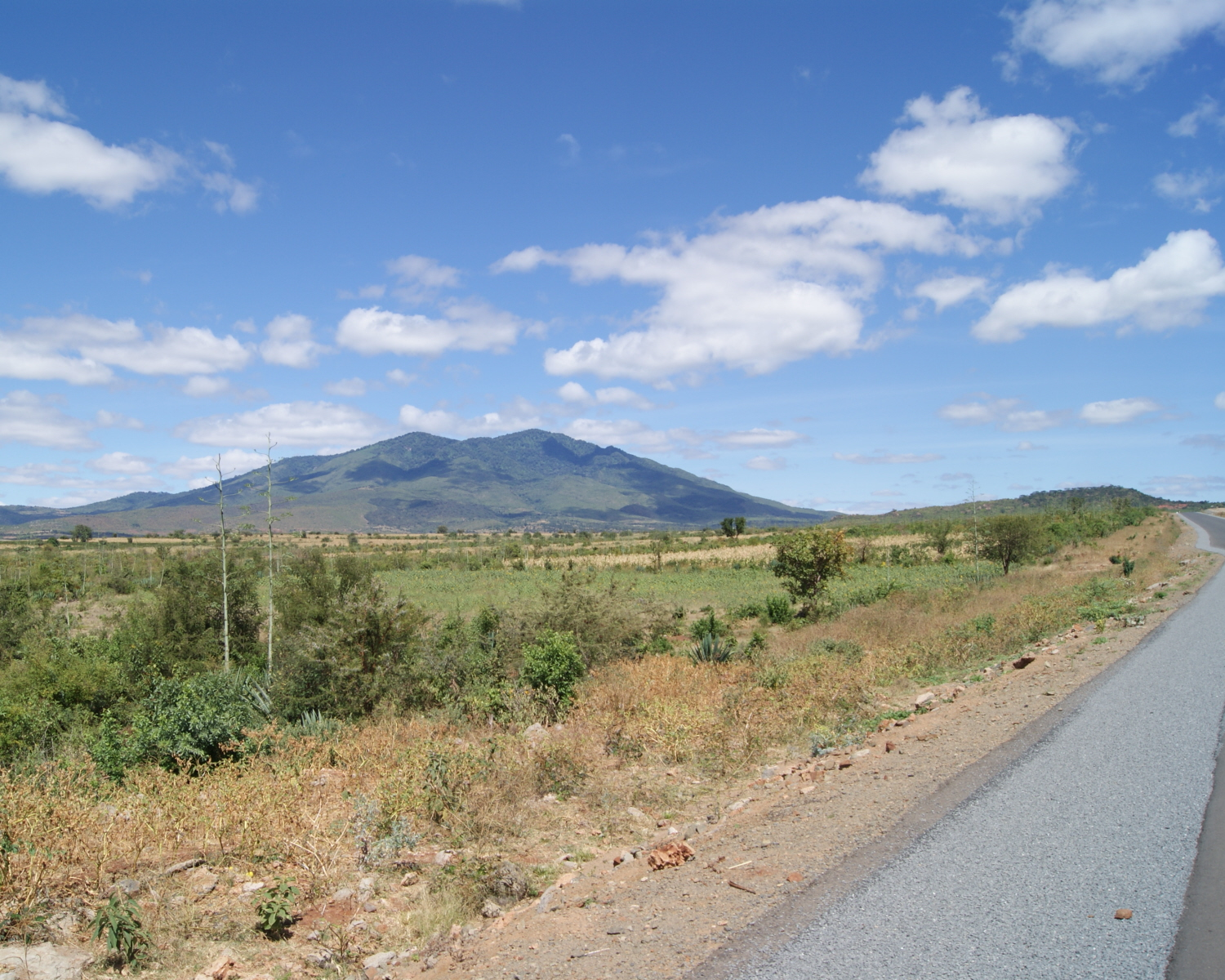

Highest point
- Elevation: 2,415 m (7,923 ft)

Geography
- Location: Manyara Region

Geology
- Mountain type: Stratovolcano
- Last eruption: Pleistocene

Mount Kwaraha is a mountain in central Tanzania. It is located approximately 5 km (3.1 mi) east of the town of Babati, in Babati District of Manyara Region.

Mount Kwaraha is a granite inselberg, and rises to 2,415 m (7,923 ft). The mountain has numerous springs and streams which flow west into Lake Babati and east into the Tarangire River.

The mountain has mist forests above 1,800 m (5,900 ft) elevation, and is home to small numbers of elephants and buffalo, and large numbers of birds and monkeys.

Ufiome Forest Reserve covers 54.36 km^{2} (20.99 sq mi) of the mountain.
