= Magugu =

Ward in Babati Rural District, Manyara Region

- Ward
- Location within Tanzania
- Coordinates: 03°59′43″S 35°46′54″E
- Country: Tanzania
- Region: Manyara
- District: Babati

Population (2012)
  - Total: 23,682
- Time zone: UTC+03 (EAT)

Magugu is an administrative ward in the Babati district of the Manyara Region of Tanzania. According to the 2002 census, the ward has a total population of 23,682. It is famous for its aromatic rice.

== Location ==
Magugu lies north of Babati, west of Tarangire National Park, south of Madukani, and east of Kiru.

== Name ==
Magugu is a Swahili word meaning 'weeds'.

== History ==
Magugu grew out of an anti-sleeping sickness (African trypanosomiasis) settlement which was established in the early 1940s. In 1997, the area was described as being "dust and thorn scrub".

== Agriculture ==
Among the crops grown for food are rice, sorghum, maize, beans, sweet potatoes and cassava. The cash crops are groundnuts, sunflowers, sugarcane, rice and cotton. The livestock are cattle, goats, sheep and poultry.

== Education ==
World Vision, which started the Magugu Area Development Programme covering 14 villages and more than 57,000 people in 2005, describes Magugu as having 24 primary schools and two secondary schools in 2005. Among the schools in Magugu are Joshua Primary School, which educates approximately 350 children, and Joshua Secondary School, which was established in 2007.

== Health ==
World Vision describes Magugu as having one health centre and 11 dispensaries in 2005. Mrara District Hospital in Babati and Support for International Change established a mobile antiretroviral drug clinic in Gallapo and Magugu wards in 2008.

Tourism:

Magugu tourism potential is large as it is located near Tarangire National Park. Tourists visit Tarangire for wildlife safaris and outdoor travel camping safaris. Cultural tourism is way of local people to exhibit their customs and tribe taboos including way of life and agriculture. There are many tribes in Babati such as Iraq, Nyaturu, Pare, Chagga, Wajita, Masai, Tindiga, Hadzabe and more

Potential Travel company for cultural tourism and Agro tourism in Magugu is Kilimanjaro Tanzanite Safaris Co.Ltd, check online

Wildlife safaris to Tarangire in 4x4 game drives to see most wildlife species include big game wildlife like Elephants to small wildlife. Since Tarangire is near to local farms, wild pigs usually explore local farms for ripe crops such as maize, sweet potatoes, ground nuts and cassava.
