= Kongwa District =

- District
- Kongwa District of Dodoma Region.
- Coordinates: 06°11′34″S 36°24′26″E
- Country: Tanzania
- Region: Dodoma Region

Area
  - Total: 3,958 km^{2} (1,528 sq mi)

Population (2022 census)
  - Total: 443,867
  - Density: 112.1/km^{2} (290.5/sq mi)

Kongwa District is one of the seven districts of the Dodoma Region of Tanzania. It is bordered to the north by Manyara Region, to the east by Morogoro Region, to the south by Mpwapwa District, and to the west by Chamwino District. Its district capital is the town of Kongwa.

According to the 2012 Tanzania National Census, the population of Kongwa District was 309,973, up from 249,760 in the 2002 Census. By 2022, the population had grown to 443,867.

== Transport ==
Paved trunk road T3 from Morogoro to Dodoma passes through the district.

== Administrative subdivisions ==
As of 2012, Kongwa District was administratively divided into 22 wards.

=== Wards ===
- Chamkoroma
- Chitego
- Chiwe
- Hogoro
- Iduo
- Kibaigwa
- Kongwa
- Lenjulu
- Makawa
- Matongoro
- Mkoka
- Mlali
- Mtanana
- Nghumbi
- Ngomai
- Njoge
- Pandambili
- Sagara
- Sejeli
- Songambele
- Ugogoni
- Zoissa

== See also ==
- Madunga
- Magara
- Riroda
