= Qash =

Ward in Babati Rural District, Manyara Region

- Ward
- Location within Tanzania
- Coordinates: 04°20′56″S 36°03′21″E
- Country: Tanzania
- Region: Manyara
- District: Babati

Population (2002)
  - Total: 19,549
- Time zone: UTC+03 (EAT)

Qash is an administrative ward in the Kongwa district of the Manyara Region of Tanzania. According to the 2012 census, the ward has a total population of 19,549.
