= Apashe =

Belgian-born Canadian musician (born 1992)

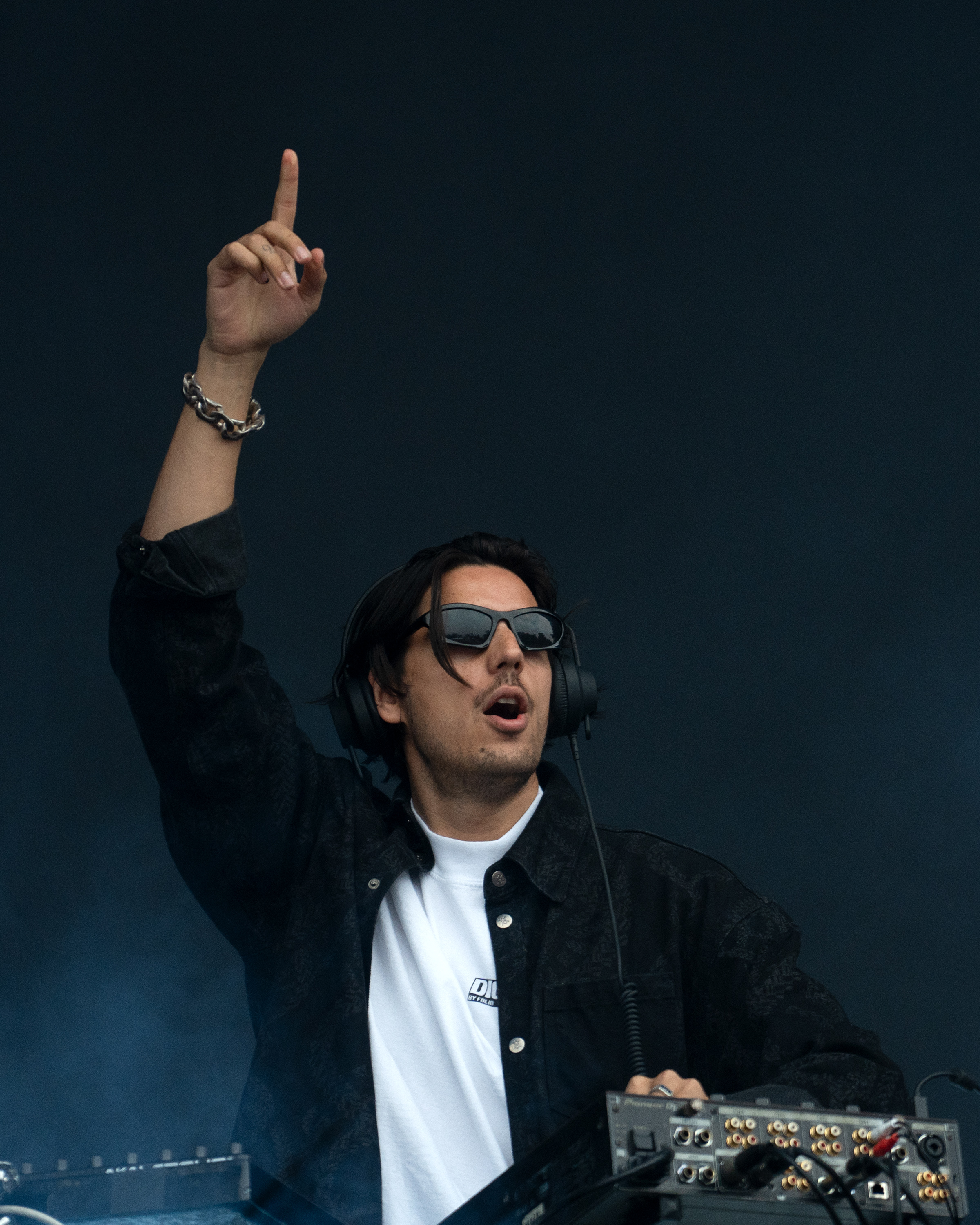
- Apashe in 2023

Background information
- Born: John De Buck; 9 May 1992 (age 34); Brussels, Belgium
- Genres: Hip hop; EDM; dubstep; neurofunk; trap; classical music
- Occupations: musician; producer
- Years active: 2011–present
- Labels: Majestic Collective; Kannibalen Records
- Website: www.apashemusic.com

John De Buck (born 9 May 1992), known professionally as Apashe (pronounced 'A-pa-she'), is a Belgian-born Canadian musician. He was born in Brussels, Belgium and currently lives in Montreal, Quebec.

== Life and career ==
Apashe was born in Brussels. At the age of 19 he moved to Canada. There he began studying electroacoustics at Concordia University and then stayed in Montreal. After his studies he worked as a sound designer at Apollo Studio, where he co-produced the sound design for video games (e.g. Assassin's Creed, Watch Dogs, Far Cry) and the sound for Ubisoft gaming trailers. In 2014 he left the company as his own music started to kick off. In 2020 he released his second album Renaissance – a mix of electronic and classical music. For this project the Prague Symphony Orchestra with 69 instruments was hired. Requiem, which won GAMIQ's Electronic EP of the Year, and Renaissance were produced in his first own studio. His music has been used in various movie and series trailers e.g. John Wick, Iron Fist, Kingsman: The Golden Circle, Fast & Furious, and Love, Death & Robots Volume 3.

Apashe describes his music as "majestic" (a mix of classical and electronic music). When Apashe composes, he takes inspiration from movie scenes that he creates in his head, while still aiming to make his music danceable. He has collaborated with Tech N9ne, Dabin, Sway, Black Prez, Wasiu, Lubalin, wifisfuneral, RIOT, Vladimir Cauchemar, g. Alina Pash and more.

== Discography ==
=== Albums & LPs ===
- Copter Boy (2016)
- Copter Boy Remix LP (2017)
- Renaissance (2020)
- Renaissance (Remixes) (2021)
- Antagonist (2023)
- Antagonist (Remixes) Part I (2024)
- Antagonist (Remixes) Part II (2024)

=== Singles and EPs ===
- Machines Should Work (2011)
- Contamination (2012)
- Ritual (2012)
- Funky Family EP (2013)
- Black Mythology EP (2013)
- Golden Empire (2014)
- Goodbye (2014)
- No Twerk (ft. Panther & Odalisk) (2014)
- Battle Royale (ft. Panther) (2014)
- Confess (with LeKtriQue) (2015)
- I'm A Dragon EP (2015)
- Trap Requiem (with Tha Trickaz) (2015)
- I'm A Dragon Remix EP (ft. Sway) (2015)
- No Twerk (ft. Panther & Odalisk) (VIP) (2015)
- Songs from "Fresh Flesh" (2015)
- Tank Girls EP (2015)
- Skeleton Dance (ft. Lena) (2016)
- Fire Inside (with RIOT) (2016) (Copter Boy)
- Supernova (ft. Dope D.O.D.) (2017)
- Requiem (2018)
- Do It (ft. Black Prez) (2018)
- Feeling Good (ft. Cherry Lena) (2018)
- Requiem Remix EP (2018)
- The Good, The Bad & The Fake (2019)
- Annihilation (with JayKode) (2019)
- Distance (ft. Geoffroy) (2019) (Renaissance)
- Uebok (Gotta Run) (ft. Instasamka) (2020) (Renaissance)
- Insane (ft. Tech N9ne) (2020) (Renaissance)
- Dead (ft. Yizzy) (2020) (Renaissance)
- Work (ft. Vo Williams) (2020) (Renaissance)
- Малый повзрослел (Apashe Remix) (2020)
- I Killed the Orchestra (2021)
- RIP (with Vladimir Cauchemar) (2022) (Antagonist)
- I Killed the Orchestra Remix EP (2022)
- Gasoline (ft. Raga) (2023) (Antagonist)
- Fracture (with Flux Pavilion ft. Joey Valence & Brae) (2023) (Antagonist)
- Revenge of the Orchestra (ft. Magugu) (2023) (Antagonist)
- Devil May Cry (ft. Sofiane Pamart) (2023) (Antagonist)
- Lost In Mumbai (ft. Geoffroy) (2023) (Antagonist)

== Music videos ==
Apashe worked with director, cinematographer and friend Adrian Villagomez on the music videos for the songs "RIP", "Lord & Master", "Uebok" and many more. 3D-Artist and motion designer Josué Zabeau created a lot of the visual effects for his music videos and visuals for his live shows.

== Awards ==
Berlin Music Video Awards

Year	Category	Song	Status
2017	Best Music Video	"Fuck Boy"	Nominated
2021	Best Song	"Uebok"	2nd place
2022	Best Song	"Lord & Master"	1st place
2023	Best VFX	"R.I.P."	Nominated
2025	Best Director	"Catch Me"	Nominated
2026	Best Concept	"Kyiv"	Nominated

GAMIQQ

Year	Category	Project	Status
2018	Electronic EP of The Year	Requiem	Won
