= Kw'adza =

Kw'adza may refer to:

- the Kw'adza people
- the Kw'adza language
