= Gidamis Shahanga =

Tanzanian long-distance runner

Medal record

Men's athletics

Representing Tanzania

African Championships
Silver medal – second place	1979 Dakar	Marathon

Gidamis Shahanga (born September 4, 1957, in Katesh, Hanang District in Manyara Region), is a retired Tanzanian long-distance runner who specialized in the 10,000 metres and the marathon race. His personal best at the marathon was 2:08:32 at the 1990 Berlin Marathon.

Shahanga was an All-American runner for the UTEP Miners track and field team, contributing to their cross country team as well. In May 1983, he set an unofficial 34:13 world record over the road 12 kilometres distance in Portland, Oregon. He thought the race distance would be only 10 kilometres until getting on the bus to the competition. In an attempt on the marathon world record, Shahanga won the 1984 Rotterdam Marathon in a time of 2:11:12 hours. He won the February 1984 Los Angeles International Marathon on the same course as the Olympic marathon he ran later that year.

Gidamis is the brother of fellow UTEP Miners runner Alfredo Shahanga.

== Achievements ==
Year	Competition	Venue	Position	Event	Notes
Representing Tanzania
1978	Commonwealth Games	Edmonton, Canada	1st	Marathon	2:15:40
1979	African Championships	Dakar, Senegal	2nd	Marathon	2:36:46
1980	Olympic Games	Moscow, Soviet Union	15th	Marathon	2:16:47
1982	Commonwealth Games	Brisbane, Australia	1st	10,000 m	28:10.15
1982	Commonwealth Games	Brisbane, Australia	6th	Marathon	2:14:25
1983	World Championships	Helsinki, Finland	5th	10,000 m	28:01.93
1983	New York City Marathon	New York City, United States	6th	Marathon	2:11:05
1984	Los Angeles Marathon	Los Angeles, United States	1st	Marathon	2:10:19
1984	Rotterdam Marathon	Rotterdam, Netherlands	1st	Marathon	2:11:12
1984	Olympic Games	Los Angeles, United States	22nd	Marathon	2:16:27
1986	Los Angeles Marathon	Los Angeles, United States	2nd	Marathon	2:13:27
1986	Hamburg Marathon	Hamburg, Germany	2nd	Marathon	2:14:07
1986	Beijing Marathon	Beijing, China	4th	Marathon	2:09:39
1988	Boston Marathon	Boston, United States	21st	Marathon	2:17:33
1988	East and Central African Championships	Nairobi, Kenya	1st	10,000 m	29:17.3
1988	New York City Marathon	New York City, United States	4th	Marathon	2:13:50
1988	Honolulu Marathon	Honolulu, United States	3rd	Marathon	2:16:47
1989	Los Angeles Marathon	Los Angeles, United States	4th	Marathon	2:15:32
1989	Honolulu Marathon	Honolulu, United States	3rd	Marathon	2:14:05
1990	Vienna Marathon	Vienna, Austria	1st	Marathon	2:09:28
1990	Berlin Marathon	Berlin, Germany	2nd	Marathon	2:08:32
1993	Munich Marathon	Munich, Germany	1st	Marathon	2:14:28
1993	Berlin Marathon	Berlin, Germany	9th	Marathon	2:14:34
1994	Munich Marathon	Munich, Germany	1st	Marathon	2:17:27
1994	Hannover Marathon	Hannover, Germany	3rd	Marathon	2:15:11
