= Dareda =

Ward in Babati Rural District, Manyara Region

- Ward
- Location within Tanzania
- Coordinates: 04°13′13″S 35°33′36″E
- Country: Tanzania
- Region: Manyara
- District: Babati

Population (2012)
  - Total: 22,880
- Time zone: UTC+03 (EAT)

Dareda is an administrative ward and a town in the Babati Rural District of the Manyara Region of Tanzania. According to the 2002 census, the ward has a total population of 18,013.

According to the 2012 census, the ward has a population of 22,880.

== Hospital ==
Dareda Hospital is located here. It is designated for Babati Council.
