= Arri (Tanzanian ward) =

Ward in Babati Rural District, Manyara Region

- Ward
- Location within Tanzania
- Coordinates: 04°13′41″S 35°36′22″E
- Country: Tanzania
- Region: Manyara
- District: Babati

Population (2012)
  - Total: 14,146
- Time zone: UTC+03 (EAT)

Arri is an administrative ward in the Babati Rural District of the Manyara Region of Tanzania.

According to the 2012 census, the ward has a population of 14,146.
