= Haydom =

- Town
- Location in Tanzania
- Coordinates: 04°11′30″S 35°01′33″E
- Country: Tanzania
- Region: Manyara Region
- District: Mbulu District

Population (2012)
  - Total: 23,013
- Time zone: GMT + 3

Haydom is a town and a ward in Mbulu District, in the Manyara Region of Tanzania.

According to the 2012 census, the population of Haydom ward is 23,013.

Haydom Lutheran Hospital is located in Haydom town. It is the largest hospital in the Mbulu area, with a capacity of over 400 beds.
