= Babati (Tanzanian ward) =

Ward in Babati Urban, Manyara, Tanzania

- Ward
- Location within Tanzania
- Coordinates: 04°12′36″S 35°44′57″E
- Country: Tanzania
- Region: Manyara
- District: Babati Urban District

Population (2012)
  - Total: 16,718
- Time zone: UTC+03 (EAT)

Babati is an administrative ward in the Babati Urban District of the Manyara Region of Tanzania. According to the 2012 census, the ward has a population of 16,718.
