= HLH =

HLH may refer to:

== Biology and medicine ==
- Hemophagocytic lymphohistiocytosis, a blood disorder
- Basic helix–loop–helix, a structural motif in proteins
- Hectopsyllidae, a family of parasitic fleas

== Places ==
- Haydom Lutheran Hospital, in Manyara Region, Tanzania
- Ulanhot Yilelite Airport, in Inner Mongolia, China
- Hulan District, in Harbin, China; see List of administrative divisions of Heilongjiang
- Merrill (Marriner Wood) Hall, a dorm at Brigham Young University in Provo, Utah, U.S.; see List of Brigham Young University buildings#Helaman Halls

== Other uses ==
- HLH Orion minicomputer, by High Level Hardware Ltd
- Harry Lloyd Hopkins (1890–1946), an American statesman; see George Racey Jordan#Congressional testimony
- Hillesheimite, a mineral; see List of mineral symbols#H
- Hala Air, an airline based in Sudan; see List of airline codes (H)
- Heavy-lift helicopter, a type of military helicopter
- Haklau Min, a variety of Min Chinese, by proposed ISO 639-3 code
