= Katesh =

Ward in Hanang, Manyara, Tanzania

- Town
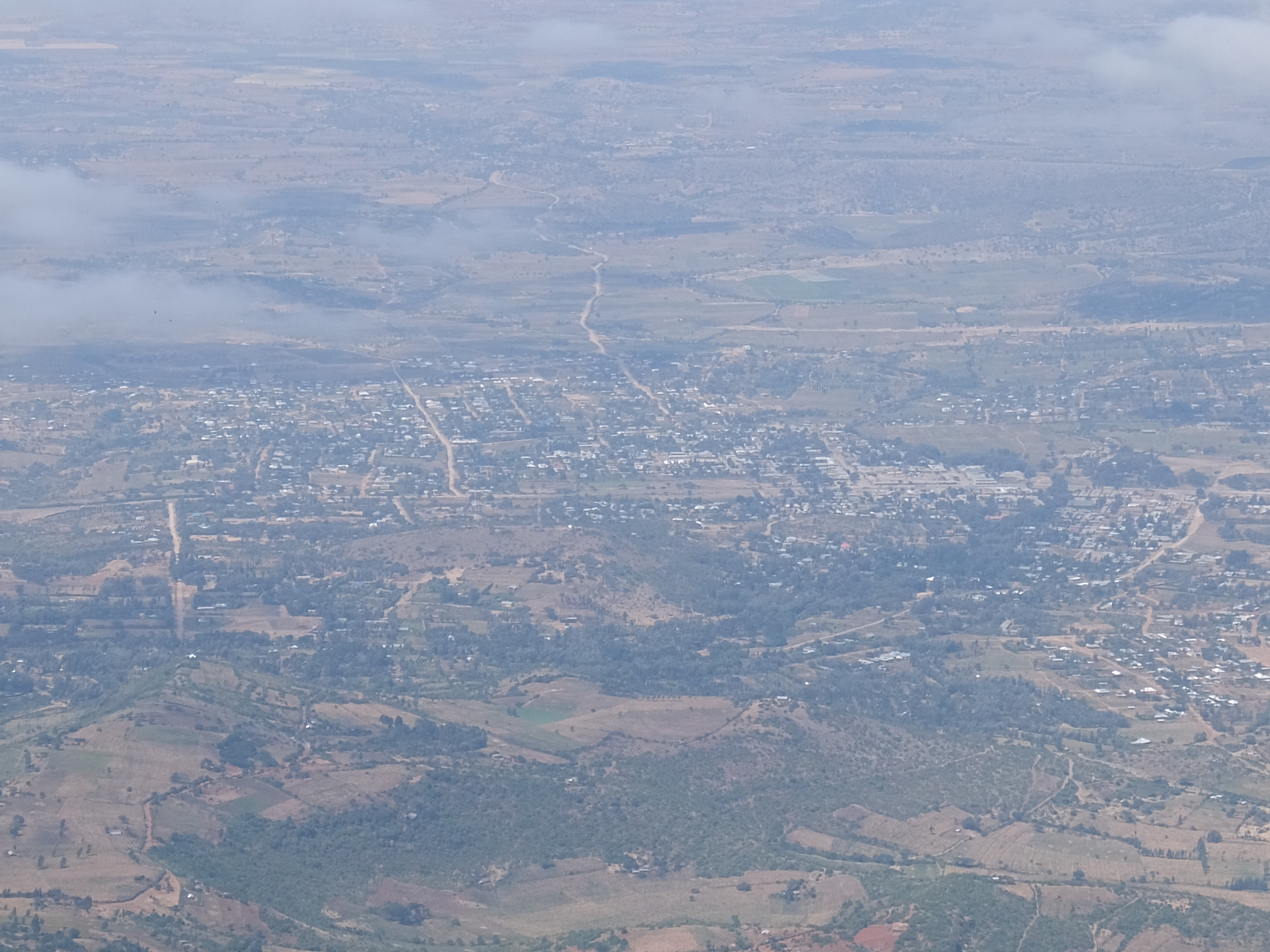
- An aerial view of the town as seen from Mount Hanang.

- Location of Katesh
- Coordinates: 04°31′22″S 35°23′19″E
- Country: Tanzania
- Region: Manyara Region
- District: Hanang District

Government
  - Type: Town Council
- Time zone: GMT + 3
- Website: Region website

Katesh is a town in northern Tanzania. The town is located in Hanang District, Manyara Region. Paved trunk road T14 from Singida to Babati passes through the town.

According to the 2012 census, the population of Katesh ward is 8,774.

The main ascent to nearby Mount Hanang starts in Katesh.
