= Kibaya, Manyara =

Ward in Kiteto, Manyara, Tanzania

Kibaya
- Town
- Location in Tanzania
- Coordinates: 05°18′05″S 36°34′57″E
- Country: Tanzania
- Region: Manyara Region
- District: Kiteto District

Population (2012)
  - Total: 8,759
- Time zone: GMT + 3

Kibaya is a town and a ward in the Manyara Region of Tanzania. It is the district headquarter of Kiteto District.

According to the 2012 census, the population of Kibaya is 8,759.
