= Gidas (Tanzanian ward) =

Ward in Babati Rural District, Manyara Region

- Ward
- Location within Tanzania
- Coordinates: 04°25′17″S 35°40′37″E
- Country: Tanzania
- Region: Manyara
- District: Babati

Population (2012)
  - Total: 7,392
- Time zone: UTC+03 (EAT)

Gidas is an administrative ward in the Babati Rural District of the Manyara Region of Tanzania.

According to the 2002 census, the ward had a total population of 11,288. According to the 2012 census, the ward has a population of 7,392. In 2022, the ward's population was measured as 7,058.
