= Bashnet =

- Ward
- Location within Tanzania
- Coordinates: 04°13′12″S 35°25′14″E
- Country: Tanzania
- Region: Manyara
- District: Babati

Population (2012)
  - Total: 17,298
- Time zone: UTC+03 (EAT)

Bashnet is an administrative ward in Babati District of Manyara Region of Tanzania. According to the 2002 census, the ward has a total population of 17,298.
