= Nkaiti =

Ward in Babati Rural District, Manyara Region

- Ward
- Location within Tanzania
- Coordinates: 03°44′45″S 35°55′40″E
- Country: Tanzania
- Region: Manyara
- District: Babati

Population (2002)
  - Total: 14,150
- Time zone: UTC+03 (EAT)

Nkaiti is an administrative ward in the Babati district of the Manyara Region of Tanzania. According to the 2012 census, the ward has a total population of 14,150.
