= Ufana =

Ward in Babati, Manyara, Tanzania

- Ward
- Location within Tanzania
- Coordinates: 04°14′36″S 35°21′47″E
- Country: Tanzania
- Region: Manyara
- District: Babati

Population (2012)
  - Total: 20,189
- Time zone: UTC+03 (EAT)

Ufana is an administrative ward in the Babati District of the Manyara Region of Tanzania. According to the 2012 census, the ward has a total population of 20,189.
