= Duru =

Ward in Babati Rural District, Manyara Region

- Ward
- Location within Tanzania
- Coordinates: 04°19′20″S 35°35′42″E
- Country: Tanzania
- Region: Manyara
- District: Babati

Population (2012)
  - Total: 11,526
- Time zone: UTC+03 (EAT)

Duru is a ward and a village in Babati Rural District of the Manyara Region of Tanzania. Duru is one of the five villages that makes up Duru ward. Thus, the name Duru is also the name of the administrative ward. The ward comprises five villages: Hoshan, Duru, Gesbert, Yarotonik and Endagwe. The headquarters of the ward is located in Endagwe village. According to the 2002 census, the ward has a total population of 9,686. Duru ward has two secondary schools. Duru secondary school locate at Endagwe village and Haitemba secondary school located at Duru village.

== Economic activities ==
Duru ward is located in the escarpment of Haitemba forest which is mostly made of Miombo woodland. The area receives average rainfall that favours different crops such as millet, maize, banana, peas and beans.

According to the 2012 census, the ward has a population of 11,526.
