= Dabil =

Ward in Babati Rural District, Manyara Region

- Ward
- Location within Tanzania
- Coordinates: 4°19′23″S 35°25′57″E
- Country: Tanzania
- Region: Manyara
- District: Babati

Population (2012)
  - Total: 16,781
- Time zone: UTC+03 (EAT)

Dabil is an administrative ward in the Babati Rural District of the Manyara Region of Tanzania. According to the 2002 census, the ward has a total population of 13,769.

According to the 2012 census, the ward has a population of 16,781.
