= Endakiso =

Endakiso is an administrative ward in the Babati District of the Manyara Region of Tanzania. According to the 2012 census, the ward has a population of 9,246.
