= Mamire =

Ward in Babati Rural District, Manyara Region

- Ward
- Location within Tanzania
- Coordinates: 04°09′25″S 35°50′30″E
- Country: Tanzania
- Region: Manyara
- District: Babati

Population (2012)
  - Total: 9,814
- Time zone: UTC+03 (EAT)

Mamire is an administrative ward in the Babati District of the Manyara Region of Tanzania. According to the 2012 census, the ward has a total population of 9,814.

Mamire have one Teachers' College, one secondary school and six primary schools.

1: Mamire Teachers' College http://mamiretc.ac.tz/

2: Mamire Secondary school

3: Mamire primary school

4: Endagile primary school

5: Samta primary school

6: Endamaghai primary school

7: Mwikantsi primary school

8: Haidadonga primary school
