= Mwada =

Ward in Babati Rural District, Manyara Region

- Ward
- Location within Tanzania
- Coordinates: 03°54′34″S 35°56′15″E
- Country: Tanzania
- Region: Manyara
- District: Babati

Population (2012)
  - Total: 13,017
- Time zone: UTC+03 (EAT)

Mwada is an administrative ward in the Babati District of the Manyara Region of Tanzania. According to the 2002 census, the ward has a total population of 13,017.
