= Riroda =

Ward in Babati, Manyara, Tanzania

- Ward
- Location within Tanzania
- Coordinates: 04°18′04″S 35°39′11″E
- Country: Tanzania
- Region: Manyara
- District: Babati

Population (2002)
  - Total: 12,179
- Time zone: UTC+03 (EAT)

Riroda is an administrative ward in the Kongwa district of the Manyara Region of Tanzania. According to the 2012 census, the ward has a total population of 12,179.
