= Kw'adza people =

Ethnic group from Manyara Region of Tanzania

The Kw'adza, also known as the Qwadza, were an ethnic group and Iraqw Communities based in the Mbulu District of Manyara Region, Tanzania. They spoke the Kw'adza language as a mother tongue, which belongs to the South Cushitic branch of the Afro-Asiatic family. The Kw'adza were related to but distinct from the Iraqw. In 1999, Ethnologue reported that the Kw'adza language had become extinct, though no information was given regarding whether living descendants of the Kw'adza people identify themselves as such.
