= Mbulu District =

Coordinates: 3.85°S 35.55°E

- District
- Mbulu District of Manyara Region
- Country: Tanzania
- Region: Manyara Region

Area
  - Total: 2,952 km^{2} (1,140 sq mi)

Population (2022)
  - Total: 238,272
  - Density: 80.72/km^{2} (209.1/sq mi)

Mbulu District is one of the six districts of the Manyara Region of Tanzania. It is bordered to the north by the Arusha Region and Lake Eyasi, to the east by the Babati Rural District, to the south by the Hanang District, and to the west by the Singida Region. According to the 2022 Tanzania National Census, the population of Mbulu District was 238,272.

The District Commissioner is Chelestino Mofugo. Mbulu District is, since the 2015 general election, divided into two election counties: Mbulu Mjini and Mbulu Vijijini.

The 2015-2020 members of parliaments are Zacharias Isaay (CCM) and Flatei Massay (CCM), for Mbulu Mjini and Mbulu Vijijini respectively.

The District is inhabited by people of different ethnic affiliations, especially the Iraqw people who are some of the earliest agro-pastoralists to migrate to what is now the Republic of Tanzania. Other native tribes are the Wahatzabeti living in Yaeda Chini, living a primitive life, and the Datooga people living in Mbulu Vijijini. People engage mainly in agriculture, keeping livestock and farming activities. There is plantation of onions in Bashay and wheat in many places.

The Mbulu District is located in the Mbulu Highlands, with forested mountains like Mount Guwang which are attractive to tourists. There's also a hot spring in Hhaynu. Lake Manyara National Park is partly in Mbulu District where tourists can come and visit. The Sanu Park Inn Lodge in Mbulu town provides accommodations for visitors.

Mbulu town has the Nyerere Stadium in Sanu Mbulu, the biggest stadium in whole Manyara Region for football and marathon. One of biggest hospitals in northern Tanzania is found in Mbulu: the Haydom Lutheran Hospital.

== Administrative subdivisions ==
As of 2012, Mbulu District was administratively divided into 32 wards.

=== Wards ===
- Ayamaami
- Ayamohe
- Bargish
- Bashay
- Daudi
- Dinamu
- Dongobesh
- Endagikot
- Endamilay
- Eshkesh
- Gehandu
- Geterer
- Gidihim
- Gunyoda
- Hayderer
- Haydom
- Imboru
- Kainam
- Maghang
- Marang
- Maretadu
- Masieda
- Masqaroda
- Murray
- Nahasey
- Nambis
- Sanu Baray
- Tlawi
- Tumati
- Uhuru
- Yaeda Ampa
- Yaeda Chini

The district headquarters at Mbulu is said to have started in 1905.
