= Haydom Lutheran Hospital =

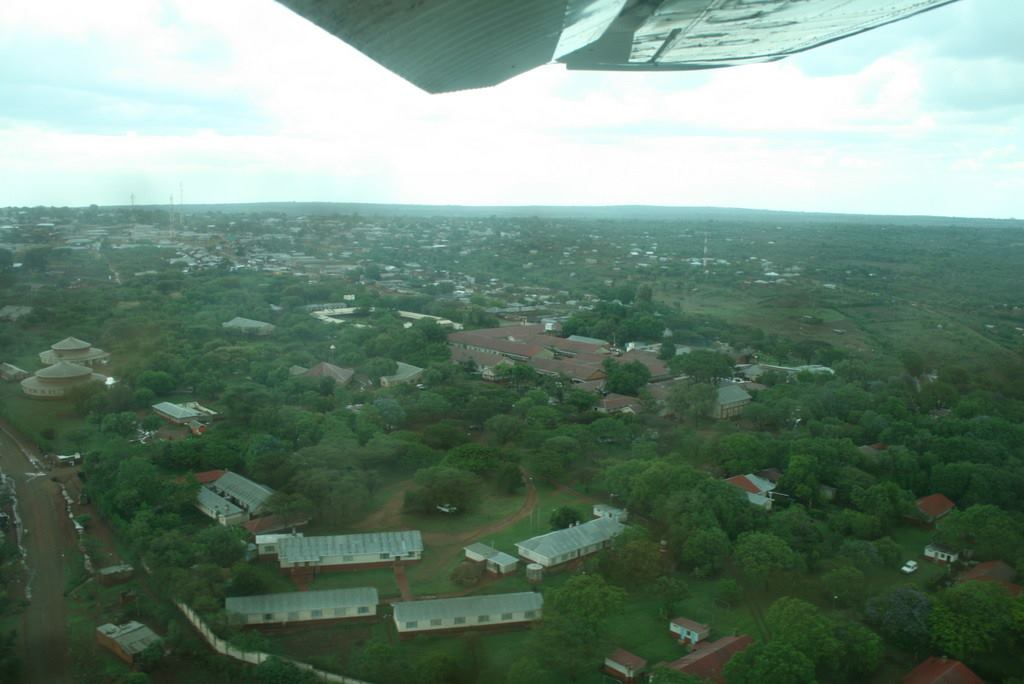
- HLH seen from an airplane.

Geography
- Location: Haydom, Mbulu District, Manyara Region, Tanzania
- Coordinates: 4.192216°S 35.026272°E

History
- Founded: 1955

Links
- Website: https://haydom.or.tz/ http://www.haydom.com/ http://www.haydom.no/

Haydom Lutheran Hospital (HLH) is a hospital in the town of Haydom at the western end of Manyara Region. The hospital is about 300 km south-west from Arusha. It was founded by Norwegian missionaries in 1955.

The hospital was founded in 1955 by the Norwegian Lutheran Mission. It is currently owned and operated by the Evangelical Lutheran Church of Tanzania. Today there is still some Norwegian activity at the hospital, in addition to Dutch, German and American support.

== See also ==
- List of hospitals in Tanzania
