= Kiru (Tanzanian ward) =

Ward in Babati Rural District, Manyara Region

- Ward
- Location within Tanzania
- Coordinates: 04°07′08″S 35°38′10″E
- Country: Tanzania
- Region: Manyara
- District: Babati

Population (2012)
  - Total: 13,119
- Time zone: UTC+03 (EAT)

Kiru is an administrative ward in the Babati Rural District of the Manyara Region of Tanzania. According to the 2002 census, the ward has a total population of 11,180.

According to the 2012 census, the ward has a population of 13,119.
