= Chamkoroma =

Administrative ward in Dodoma, Tanzania

Coordinates: 6°20′S 36°40′E

Chamkoroma is an administrative ward in the Kongwa district of the Dodoma Region of Tanzania. According to the 2002 census, the ward has a total population of 13,902.
