= Sagara (Tanzanian ward) =

Ward of Tanzania

Coordinates: 6°15′S 36°32′E

Sagara (Tanzanian ward) is an administrative ward in the Kongwa district of the Dodoma Region of Tanzania. According to the 2012 census, the ward has a total population of 23,000.
