= Kibaigwa =

Ward in Kongwa, Dodoma, Tanzania

Kibaigwa Kata ya Kibaigwa
- Ward
- Location within Tanzania
- Coordinates: 6.084582°S 36.649877°E
- Country: Tanzania
- Region: Dodoma Region
- District: Kongwa District
- Ward: Kibaigwa

Population (2016)
  - Total: 26,911
- Time zone: UTC+3 (EAT)

Kibaigwa is an administrative ward in the Kongwa District of the Dodoma Region of Tanzania. In 2016 the Tanzania National Bureau of Statistics report there were 26,911 people in the ward, from 24,761 in 2012.
