= Madunga =

Ward in Babati Rural District, Manyara, Tanzania

- Ward
- Location within Tanzania
- Coordinates: 04°08′23″S 35°28′57″E
- Country: Tanzania
- Region: Manyara
- District: Babati

Population (2012)
  - Total: 16,216
- Time zone: UTC+03 (EAT)

Madunga is an administrative ward in the Babati district of the Manyara Region of Tanzania. According to the 2002 census, the ward has a total population of 16,216.
