= Hanang District =

Coordinates: 4°26′S 35°24′E

- District
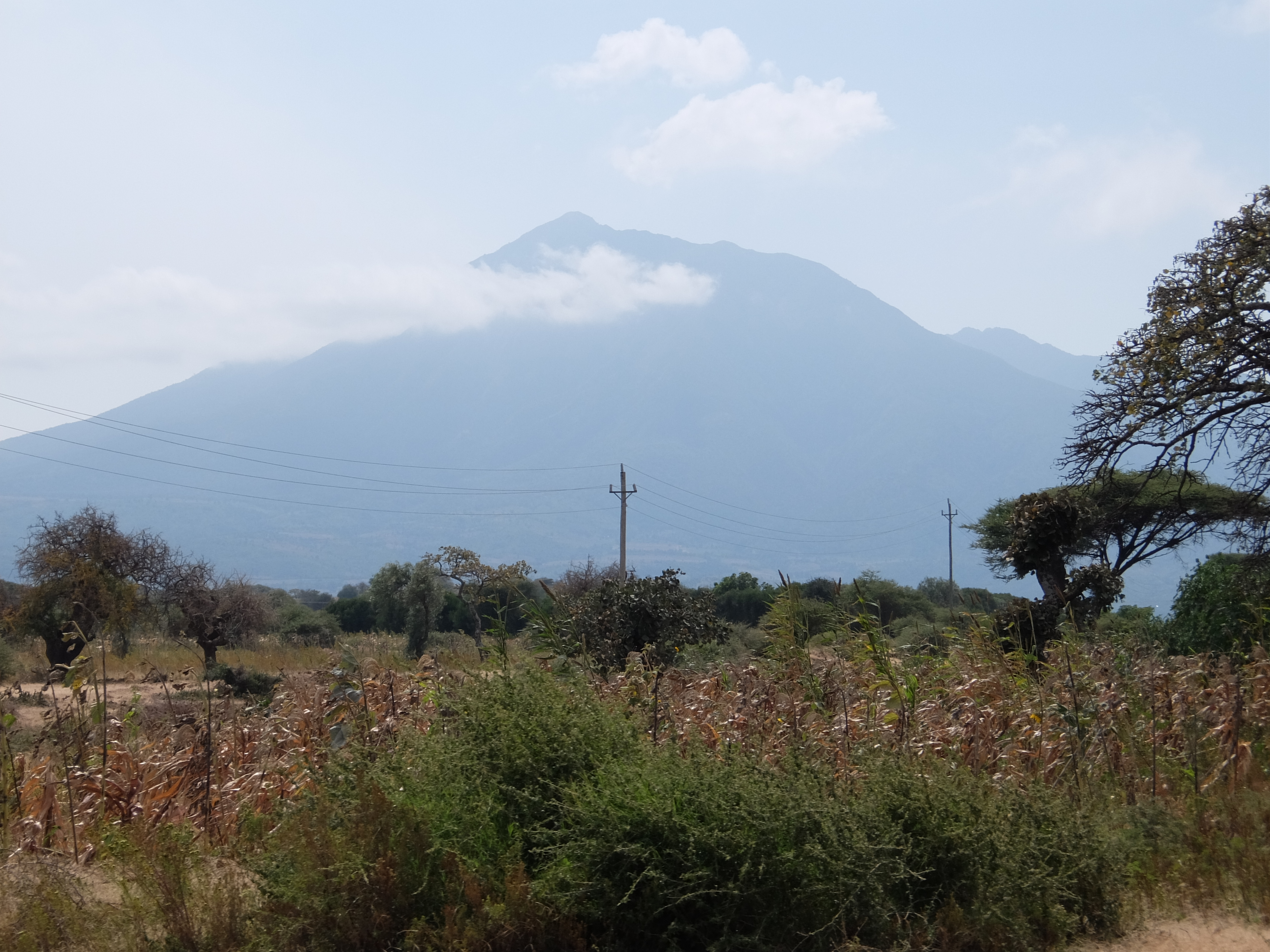
- Mount Hanang

- Hanang District of Manyara Region
- Country: Tanzania
- Region: Manyara Region

Area
  - Total: 3,674 km^{2} (1,419 sq mi)

Population (2022)
  - Total: 367,391
  - Density: 100.0/km^{2} (259.0/sq mi)
- Website: www.manyara.go.tz

Hanang District is one of the six districts of the Manyara Region of Tanzania. It is bordered to the north by the Mbulu District and Babati Rural District, to the southeast by the Dodoma Region and to the southwest by the Singida Region. Mount Hanang is located within the boundaries of the district.

According to the 2002 Tanzania National Census, the population of the Hanang District was 205,133. According to the 2022 Tanzania National Census, the population of Hanang District was 367,391.

The District Commissioner of the Hanang District is Moses B. Sanga.

== Transport ==
Paved trunk road T14 from Singida to Babati town passes through the district.

== Administrative subdivisions ==
As of 2012, Hanang District was administratively divided into 25 wards.

=== Wards ===
- Balagidalalu
- Bassodesh
- Bassotu
- Dirma
- Endasak
- Endasiwold
- Ganana
- Gehandu
- Gendabi
- Getanuwas
- Gidahababieg
- Gisambalang
- Giting
- Hidet
- Hirbadaw
- Katesh
- Laghanga
- Lalaji
- Masakta
- Maskron
- Masqaroda
- Mogitu
- Nangwa
- Simbay
- Sirop

== Notable persons from Hanang District ==
- Frederick Sumaye, 7th Tanzanian Prime Minister

== Sources ==
- Hanang District Homepage for the 2002 Tanzanian National Census
- Tanzanian Government Directory Database
