= Kongwa (Tanzanian ward) =

- Town
- Location in Tanzania
- Coordinates: 06°11′34″S 36°24′26″E
- Country: Tanzania
- Region: Dodoma Region
- District: Kongwa District

Population (2012)
  - Total: 13,531
- Time zone: GMT + 3

Kongwa is a town and an administrative ward in the Kongwa District of the Dodoma Region of Tanzania. According to the 2012 census, the ward has a total population of 13,531, with an average household size of 4.6.

Kongwa was the centre of the Tanganyika groundnut scheme, which was run by the Overseas Food Corporation (OFC) until the project was brought to an end in 1951. The facilities provided included a hospital, which still serves local patients. A school was established, originally for the children of expatriate staff of the OFC. This continued at Kongwa for a total of ten years until its closure in 1958.

From 1964 onwards, sites in the Kongwa area were used for training purposes by SWAPO and FRELIMO and, in due course, by other movements including African National Congress, MPLA and ZAPU.

Six kilometres from Kongwa itself is St Philips Theological College, which serves the Anglican Church of Tanzania. It was established in 1913 and provides training for Christian ministry in the Anglican and other churches, including some students from neighbouring countries.
