= Mount Hanang =

Mountain in Manyara Region, Tanzania

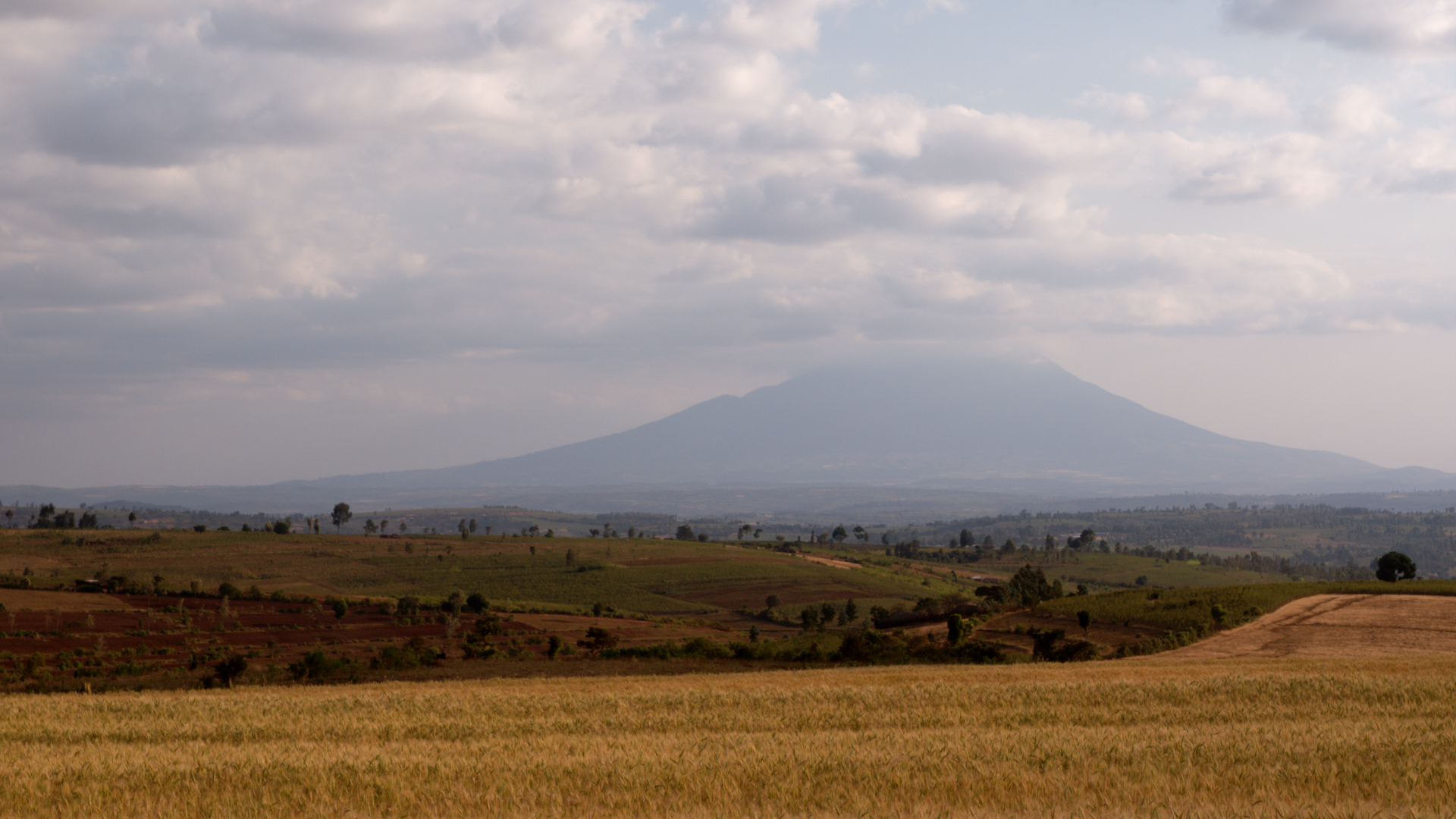
- Mount Hanang

Highest point
- Elevation: 3,420 m (11,220 ft)
- Prominence: 2,046 m (6,713 ft)
- Listing: Ultra; Ribu
- Coordinates: 4°26′06″S 35°24′00″E

Geography
- Location within Tanzania
- Location: Manyara Region, Tanzania

Geology
- Mountain type: Stratovolcano
- Last eruption: Pleistocene

Mount Hanang is a mountain in northern Tanzania. The peak has an elevation of 3,420 m above sea level. Hanang is located in Manyara Region's Hanang District. It is (after Mount Kilimanjaro, Mount Meru and Mount Loolmalasin) the fourth-highest mountain in Tanzania, if the three peaks of Kilimanjaro are counted as one mountain.

The principal path to the summit starts in the town of Katesh. The climb can be done in one day (10 hours), but it is also common for climbers to spend one night in a tented camp on the mountain and reach the summit on the second day.

== Hanang Forest Reserve ==
Mount Hanang Nature Forest Reserve has an area of 58.66 km², protecting an enclave of evergreen montane forest on the mountain's higher slopes. Between 2000 and 2700 meters elevation, evergreen montane forests cover the mountain's wetter eastern and southern slopes, while the drier western and northern slopes are home to dry montane evergreen forests with bushland and grassland on the ridges. Above 2700 meters, the forests transition to ericaceous heathland and high-altitude grasslands.

== Geology ==
Mount Hanang is a dormant stratovolcano. Its most recent eruption was in the Pleistocene.

== See also ==
- List of Ultras of Africa
- Manyara Region

== Gallery ==
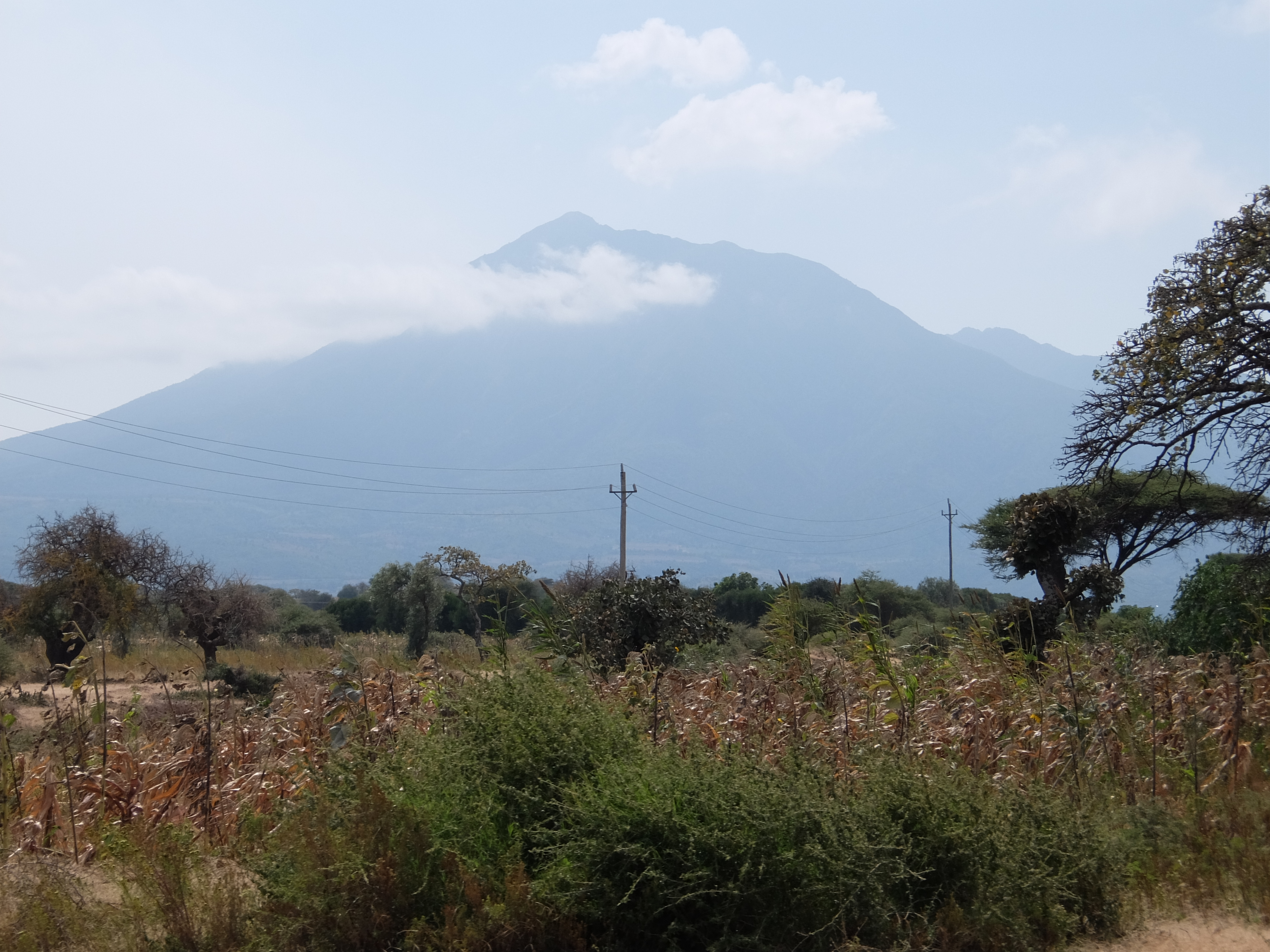

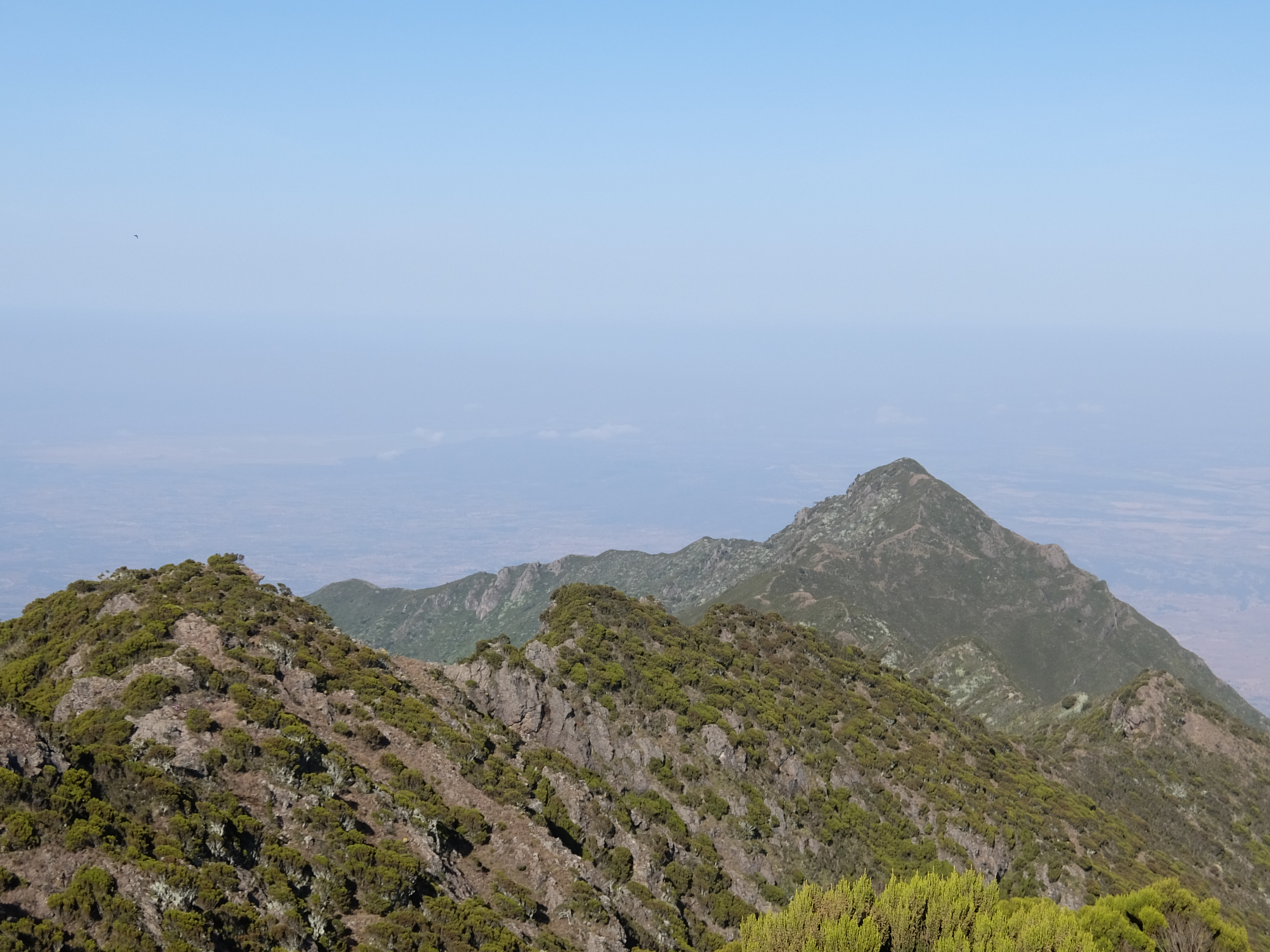

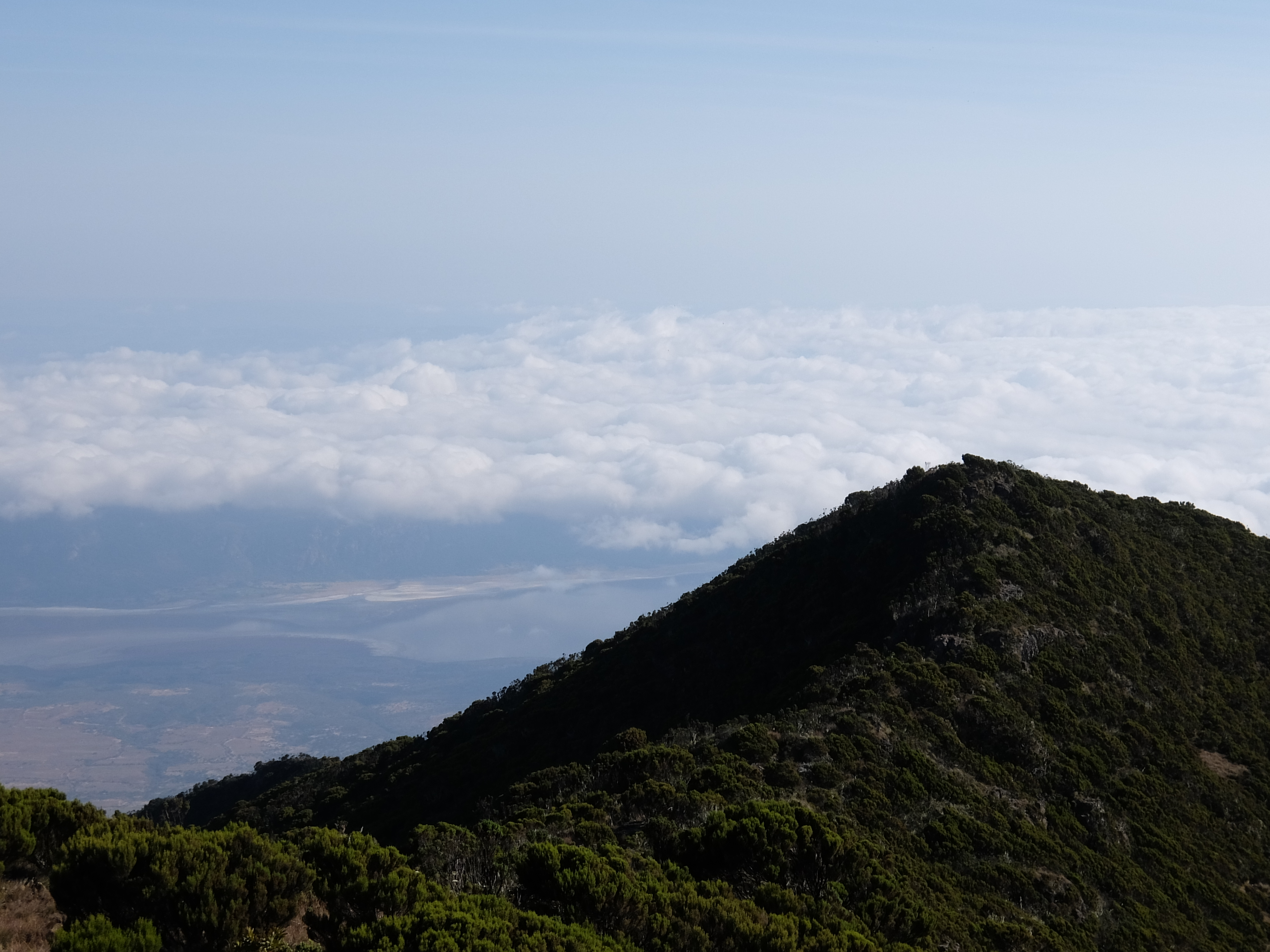

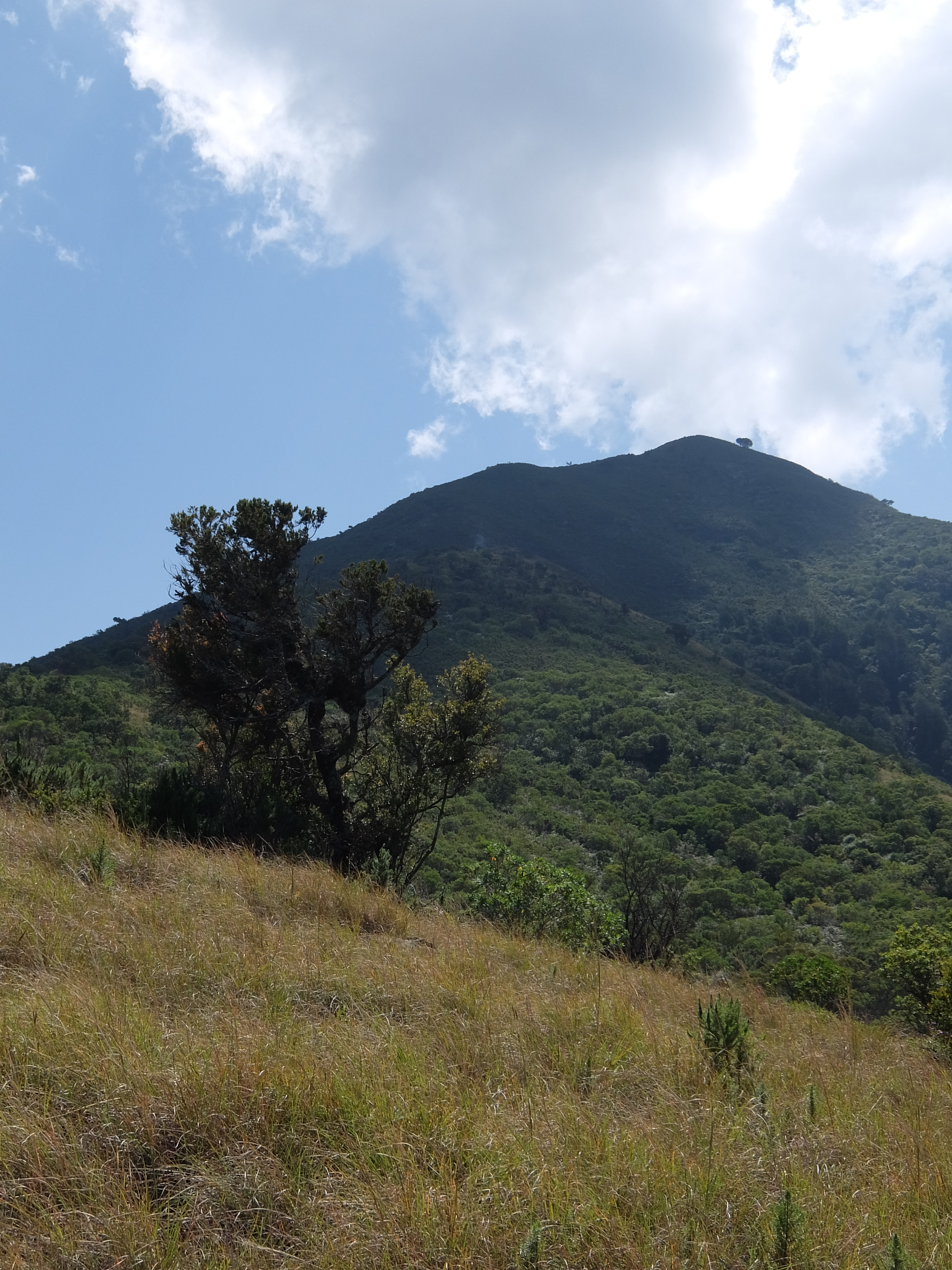
