= Magara (Tanzanian ward) =

Administrative ward in Tanzania

Coordinates: 3°50′S 35°42′E

Magara is an administrative ward in the Kongwa district of the Dodoma Region of Tanzania. According to the 2002 census, the ward has a total population of 9,222.
