= Gallapo =

- Ward
- Interactive map of Gallapo
- Coordinates: 4°16′55″S 35°51′10″E
- Country: Tanzania
- Region: Manyara Region
- District: Babati Rural District

Area
  - Total: 196.7 km^{2} (75.9 sq mi)

Population (2022)
  - Total: 23,626
- Time zone: UTC+3 (EAT)

Gallapo is a town and an administrative ward located in the Babati Rural District of the Manyara Region of Tanzania.

According to the 2002 census, the ward had a total population of 16,791. According to the 2012 census, the ward had increased to a population of 19,578. According to the 2022 Tanzania National Census, the ward had a population of 23,626, up from 19,578 in 2012, and covers an area of 196.7 square kilometres (76.0 sq mi).
