= Zoissa =

Administrative ward in Tanzania

Coordinates: 5°41′S 36°23′E

Zoissa is an administrative ward in the Kongwa district of the Dodoma Region of Tanzania. According to the 2002 census, the ward has a total population of 9,516.
