= Iduo =

Ward in Tanzania

Iduo Kata ya Iduo
- Ward
- Location within Tanzania
- Coordinates: 6.2662967°S 36.648611°E
- Country: Tanzania
- Region: Dodoma Region
- District: Kongwa
- Ward: Iduo

Population (2016)
  - Total: 12,169
- Time zone: UTC+3 (EAT)

Iduo is an administrative ward in the Kongwa district of the Dodoma Region of Tanzania. In 2016 the Tanzania National Bureau of Statistics report there were 12,169 people in the ward, from 11,197 in 2012.
