= Mkoka =

Ward in Kongwa, Dodoma, Tanzania

Mkoka Kata ya Mkoka
- Ward
- Location within Tanzania
- Coordinates: 5.8127779°S 36.433281°E
- Country: Tanzania
- Region: Dodoma Region
- District: Kongwa District
- Ward: Mkoka

Population (2016)
  - Total: 12,960
- Time zone: UTC+3 (EAT)

Mkoka is an administrative ward in the Kongwa District of the Dodoma Region of Tanzania. In 2016 the Tanzania National Bureau of Statistics report there were 12,960 people in the ward, from 11,925 in 2012.
