= Lake Babati =

Lake in Tanzania

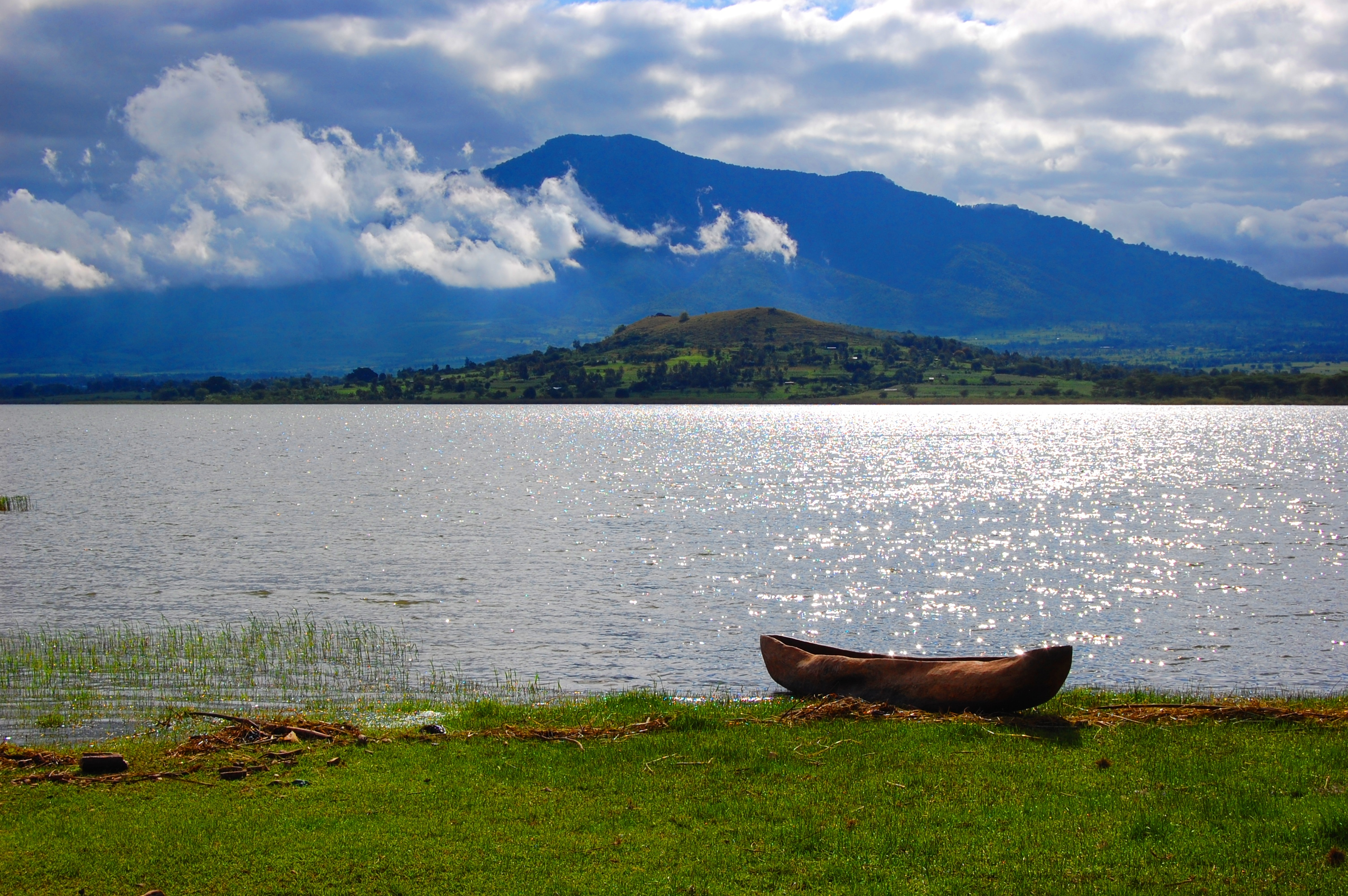
- Sunrise at Lake Babati

- Location within Tanzania
- Coordinates: 4°15′S 35°44′E
- Basin countries: Tanzania
- Max. length: 10 km (6.2 mi)
- Max. width: 3 km (1.9 mi)
- Surface area: 21 km^{2} (8.1 sq mi)
- Max. depth: 5 m (16 ft)

Lake Babati is a lake in Tanzania known for its population of hippos. Recent droughts have led to a drop in the number of sightings of hippos, causing concern for local hoteliers. The lake has an area of 21 km^{2} (8.1 sq mi), spans 10 by 3 km (6.2 by 1.9 mi), and has a maximum depth of 5 m (16 ft).

The lake is located near Babati town, in the Babati Urban District of Manyara Region.
