= Mtanana =

Mtanana Kata ya Mtanana
- Ward
- Location within Tanzania
- Coordinates: 6.0420003°S 36.5737699°E
- Country: Tanzania
- Region: Dodoma Region
- District: Kongwa District
- Ward: Mtanana

Population (2016)
  - Total: 13,650
- Time zone: UTC+3 (EAT)

Mtanana is an administrative ward in the Kongwa District of the Dodoma Region of Tanzania. In 2016 the Tanzania National Bureau of Statistics report there were 13,650 people in the ward, from 12,559 in 2012.
