= Ugogoni =

Ward in Kongwa, Dodoma, Tanzania

Ugogoni Kata ya Ugogoni
- Ward
- Location within Tanzania
- Coordinates: 6.18134°S 36.43895°E
- Country: Tanzania
- Region: Dodoma Region
- District: Kongwa District
- Ward: Ugogoni

Population (2016)
  - Total: 18,528
- Time zone: UTC+3 (EAT)

Ugogoni is an administrative ward in the Kongwa District of the Dodoma Region of Tanzania. In 2016 the Tanzania National Bureau of Statistics report there were 18,528 people in the ward, from 17,048 in 2012.
