= Njoge =

Administrative ward in Tanzania

Coordinates: 5°57′0″S 36°41′0″E

Njoge is an administrative ward in the Kongwa district of the Dodoma Region of Tanzania. According to the 2002 census, the ward has a total population of 16,216.
