= Kiteto District =

District of Manyara Region, Tanzania

Coordinates: 5.867°S 36.849°E

- District
- Kiteto District of Manyara Region
- Country: Tanzania
- Region: Manyara Region

Area
  - Total: 13,131 km^{2} (5,070 sq mi)

Population (2022)
  - Total: 352,305
  - Density: 26.830/km^{2} (69.489/sq mi)

Kiteto District is one of the six districts of the Manyara Region of Tanzania. It is bordered to the north by the Simanjiro District, to the east by the Tanga Region and to the south and west by the Dodoma Region. The district headquarters are located in Kibaya.

According to the 2022 Tanzania National Census, the population of the Kiteto District was 352,305. According to the 2012 Tanzania National Census, the population of Kiteto District was 244,669.

The District Commissioner of the Kiteto District is Lt. Lepillal Ole Moloiment.

== Administrative subdivisions ==
As of 2012, Kiteto District was administratively divided into 19 wards. Since then, new wards have been created and by 2015 the number of wards was 23.

=== Wards 2015 ===
The Kiteto District is administratively divided into 23 wards:

- Bwagamoyo
- Dongo
- Dosidosi
- Engusero
- Kibaya
- Kijungu
- Lengatei
- Makame
- Matui
- Ndedo
- Njoro
- Olboloti
- Partimbo
- Songambele
- Sunya
- Loolera
- Magungu
- Chapakazi
- Namelock
- Ndirigishi
- Kaloleni
- Bwawani
- Laiseri

== Sources ==
- Kiteto District Homepage for the 2002 Tanzania National Census
- Tanzanian Government Directory Database
