= Hogoro =

Administrative ward in the Dodoma Region of Tanzania

Coordinates: 5°57′S 36°27′E

Hogoro is an administrative ward in the Kongwa district of the Dodoma Region of Tanzania. According to the 2002 census, the ward has a total population of 29,221.
