= Pandambili =

Ward in Kongwa, Dodoma, Tanzania

Pandambili Kata ya Pandambili
- Ward
- Location within Tanzania
- Coordinates: 6.0848898°S 36.7331313°E
- Country: Tanzania
- Region: Dodoma Region
- District: Kongwa District
- Ward: Pandambili

Population (2016)
  - Total: 8,699
- Time zone: UTC+3 (EAT)

Pandambili is an administrative ward in the Kongwa District of the Dodoma Region of Tanzania. In 2016 the Tanzania National Bureau of Statistics report there were 8,699 people in the ward, from 8,004 in 2012.
