= Babati Rural District =

District in Manyara Region, Tanzania

- District
- Babati District of Manyara Region
- Coordinates: 04°13′S 035°45′E
- Country: Tanzania
- Region: Manyara

Area
  - Total: 2,150 sq mi (5,569 km^{2})

Population (2022)
  - Total: 375,200
  - Density: 174.5/sq mi (67.37/km^{2})

Babati Rural District is a district of Manyara Region of Tanzania, East Africa. The administrative capital of the district is Babati town, 172 km (107 mi) south of Arusha. The district covers an area of 6,069 km^{2} (2,343 sq mi), a large proportion (640 km^{2}) of which is covered by the water bodies of Lake Babati, Lake Burunge and Lake Manyara. The district is bordered to the north by Arusha Region, to the south east by Simanjiro District, to the south by Dodoma Region, to the south west by Hanang District, and to the north west by Mbulu District. Babati Urban District is located within the district.

Babati District was established by dividing the then Hanang District into two districts - Babati and Hanang. The decision produced Babati District, which was officially documented in the Government Official Gazette No. 403 on 1 October 1985. Babati District became autonomous in July 1986 as a District Council.

According to the 2022 Tanzania National Census, the population of the district was 375,200.

The District Commissioner of Babati District is Hadija R.R. Nyembo.

== Geography and agriculture ==
Babati District is located below the Equator between latitude 3° and 4° South and longitude 35° and 36° E. The land surface is characterized by a number of undulating hills and mountains as part of the East African Rift Valley Highlands. Babati District is divided by the Dabil-Dareda escarpment of the Rift Valley, providing diverse climatic and agro-ecological conditions due to a wide range of altitudes from 950 m asl. to 2450 m asl. Most of the soils are of volcanic origin and range from sand loam to clay alluvial soils. In the lower flat lands, like around Lakes Babati and Manyara, alkaline soils predominate. Five agro-ecological zones characterize the district.

About 90% of the population of Babati District live in the rural areas and depend on agriculture and livestock for their livelihood. They are mostly small-scale farmers or agro-pastoralists practicing a semi-traditional farming system characterized by low use of farm inputs. Mixed crop-livestock, mostly maize-based systems are widely found in the district that are intercropped with varying species, such as common beans, pigeon peas and sunflowers, according to altitude and rainfall availability. In the lowlands, paddy rice is cultivated where irrigation is available. Livestock comprise local breeds of cattle, sheep, goats, chickens and cows. Cattle are widely used for draught, for example pulling carts or ploughing fields.

== Public health ==
Only 44% out of the 96 villages have health facilities, such as dispensaries or health centers, whereas the other villages are covered by mobile and outreach services, especially for mother and child care/services.

== Administrative subdivisions ==
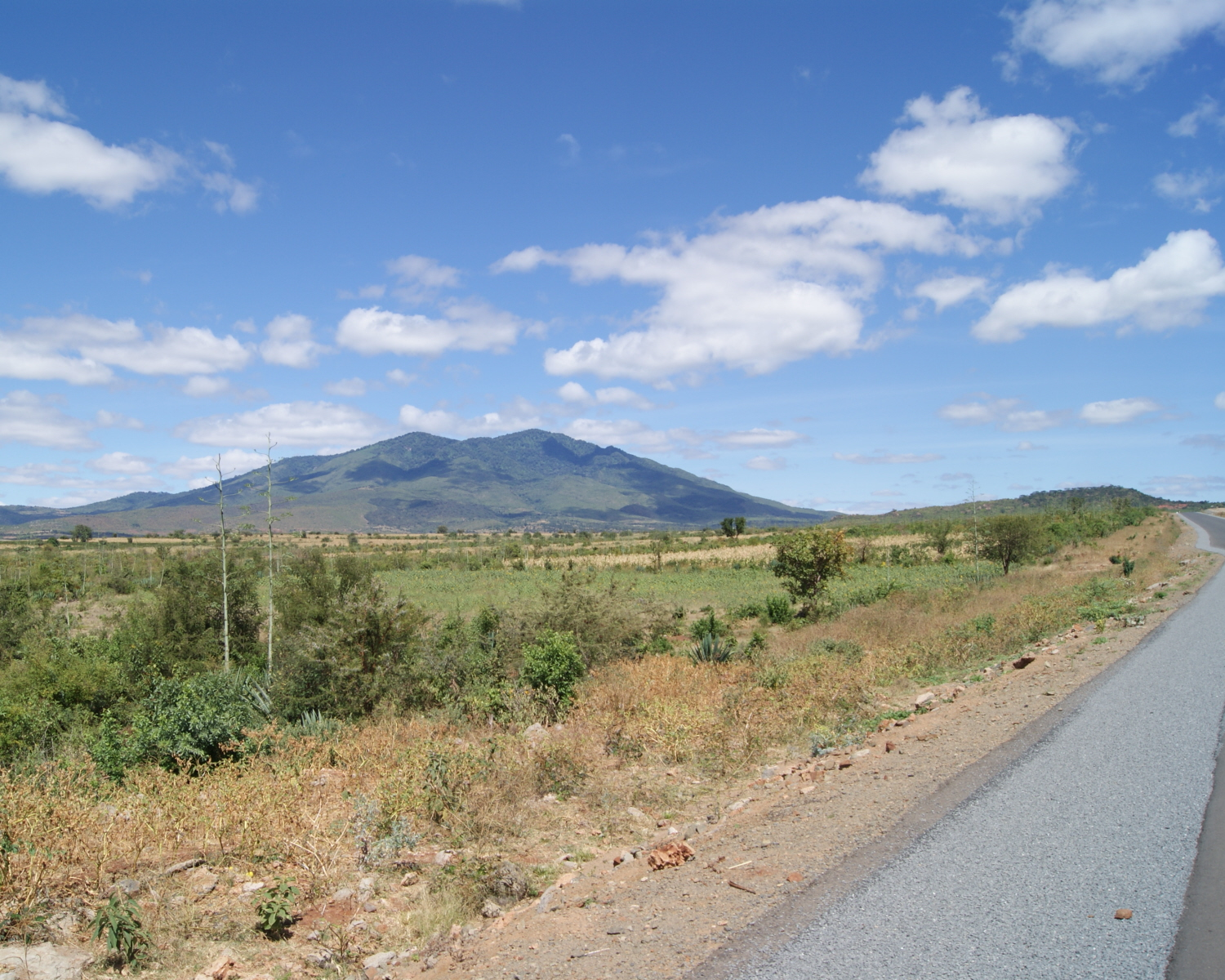
Mt Kwahara

Babati District is administratively divided into 4 divisions, 25 wards and 102 villages.

=== Divisions ===
Babati, Gorowa, Mbugwe and Bashnet.

=== Wards ===
The 25 wards are:

- Arri
- Ayalagaya
- Ayasanda
- Bashnet
- Boay
- Dabil
- Dareda
- Duru
- Endakiso
- Gallapo
- Gidas
- Kiru
- Kisangaji
- Madunga
- Magara
- Magugu
- Mamire
- Mwada
- Nar
- Nkaiti
- Qameyu
- Qash
- Riroda
- Secheda
- Ufana

== See also ==
- KEFW Babati Link Group
