= Babati Town Council, Manyara =

Babati Urban District
- District
- Babati Municipal District of Manyara Region
- Coordinates: 04°12′39″S 35°44′54″E
- Country: Tanzania
- Region: Manyara Region

Area
  - Total: 471.0 km^{2} (181.9 sq mi)

Population (2022)
  - Total: 129,572
  - Density: 275.1/km^{2} (712.5/sq mi)

Babati Urban District (or Babati Town Council) is one of the six districts of the Manyara Region of Tanzania. Babati Urban District is surrounded by Babati Rural District. The administrative capital of the district is Babati town.

According to the 2022 Tanzania National Census, the population of Babati Urban District was 129,572.

== Transport ==
Paved trunk road T14 from Singida connects with trunk road T5 in Babati Urban District. Trunk road T5 from Dodoma to Arusha passes through the district; it is paved from Babati up to Arusha.

== Administrative subdivisions ==
As of 2012, Babati Urban District was administratively divided into 8 wards.

=== Wards ===
- Babati
- Bagara
- Bonga
- Maisaka
- Mutuka
- Nangara
- Sigino
- Singe
