= Sejeli =

Administrative ward in Kongwa, Dodoma, Tanzania

Coordinates: 6°02′S 36°19′E

Sejeli is an administrative ward in the Kongwa district of the Dodoma Region in Tanzania. According to the 2002 census, it had a population of 12,242. Geographically, Sejeli is located at approximately 6°11'34" S latitude and 36°24'25" E longitude, with an elevation of around 957 meters. The area features rural landscapes and is part of the larger Dodoma Region, which is the capital region of Tanzania. Additionally, the name "Sejera" was historically linked to Ilaniya, the first Jewish settlement in the Lower Galilee, founded in 1902. However, this location is distinct and not related to Sejeli in Tanzania.
