= Geoffroy (musician) =

Canadian musician (born 1987)

Geoffroy Sauvé (born 9 December 1987), most popularly known by his stage name Geoffroy, is a Canadian singer, songwriter and multi-instrumentalist.

After debuting in 2015 with the Soaked In Gold EP, he signed to Quebec, Canada based record label Bonsound and released his first full-length album, Coastline, in March 2017 to critical and commercial success, earning a #1 on iTunes Canada on the electronic charts and a longlist for the Polaris Music Prize.

Coastline was recognized for its world-weary but hopeful songs inspired by extensive travels. For example, the mixing of the record was completed while Geoffroy was in Thailand and the now well known video for Sleeping On My Own was shot in Mexico. The next few years were reserved for extensive touring in Europe and North America with artists like Fakear. Dozens of performances and almost 40,000 miles travelled.

The following two years marked an emotional period for Geoffroy, defined by further world travel, creative trials and most significantly, the loss of his mother who succumbed to a long battle with cancer during the writing process. The result is what many considered a rich, detailed, thoughtful and deeply personal sophomore effort. The 1952 LP was released on Bonsound in 2020 and continued to demonstrate Geoffroy's passion for adventurous videos, for example the stumbling on a Bollywood set in India while filming 21 Days.

== Discography ==
- Soaked In Gold (2015) - EP - Bonsound
- Coastline (2017) - LP - Bonsound
- Wanderer (2018) - Digital Single - Bonsound
- 1952 (2020) - LP - Bonsound
- Live slow die wise (2022) - LP - Self-released
- Good Boy (2024)
