= Kwʼadza language =

East Rift language spoken in Tanzania

Kwʼadza
- Ngomvia, Qwadza
- Native to: Tanzania
- Region: Bahi
- Extinct: 1980s
- Language family: Afro-Asiatic?: Cushitic?; South; (disputed); Kwʼadza

Language codes
- ISO 639-3: wka
- Glottolog: kwad1248
- ELP: Kw'adza

Kwʼadza (Qwadza), or Ngomvia, is an extinct South Cushitic language formerly spoken in Tanzania in the Bahi District. The last speaker died sometime between 1976 and 1999.

== Setting ==
The Kwʼadza people lived in the late 19th and early 20th centuries between the Gogo and Sandawe, and reported having recently migrated to the area from Uzigua. They were agriculturalists growing sorghum, maize and millet; known domestic animals were humped cattle, donkeys, goats, sheep, doves, chickens and dogs. The exonym "Ngomvia" originates from Ungomvia, the Gogo name of their final settlement area. From this same base are also derived in Gogo and Swahili the names Wangomvia for the people, and Kingomvia for the language. Approximately 600 Kwʼadza people in 30 extended family households were reported in 1908, at which time most of them already primarily spoke Gogo. Two speakers were known to remain by 1974 in the town of Bankolo. Three clans among the Sandawe, the Ágwatl'oo, Beetsatoo and Bisa, are also remembered as having earlier been speakers of Kwʼadza.

== Classification ==
Kwʼadza is poorly attested, and its grammar was never recorded in detail. Regardless, the marking of gender and number on nouns, as well as what appear to be derivational suffixes on attested nouns and verbs, can be consistently connected with the other Rift languages.

While Kwʼadza is accordingly agreed to be a South Cushitic language, its classification within the group is not certain. Fleming and Ehret proposed that Kwʼadza would form a subgroup with Asa, called "East Rift" by the latter. Ehret proposes a set of shared East Rift sound changes, including e.g. a merger of Proto-Rift pharyngeals *ħ and *ʕ with the glottals *h and *ʔ, respectively, and a merger of a Proto-Rift central vowel *ɨ into either *e or *o depending on the consonant environment. Kruijsdijk (2024) instead argues that Kw'adza is closer to West Rift than to Asa, being the second to split off from West Rift. Blažek (2019) proposes, using a glottochronological analysis, that Kw'adza was the first to split off from West Rift, though notes that some figures may not be reliable due to later influence, i.e. of Burunge on Alagwa.

The known lexicon of Kwʼadza has a large stock of identifiably Rift / South Cushitic roots, as well as loanwords from other languages from the area, as also in the other Rift languages. The non-Cushitic numerals itame 'one' and beʼa ~ mbɛa 'two' suggest a connection with Hadza, while e.g. haka 'four' (found also as Asa hak and Mbugu háí) suggests a connection with Sandawe and the Khoe languages. Ehret notes as distinctively East Rift lexicon, shared only by Kʼwadza and Asa, the following:

meaning	Kwʼadza	Asa	Kwʼadza	meaning	Asa	meaning
'beer'	sawako	šeba	deleʔ-	'to make a rude sucking noise with the lips'	deʔ- dedeʔ-	'to belch' 'to quarrel'
'black'	-abesu	-biasa	faʔamo	'buffalo'	faʔanok	'elephant'
'giraffe'	gweʔesiko	geʔesuk	nigiliko	'baobab'	nikidok	'large ficus species'
'unripe'	tsʼetsʼem-	reše (< *detsʼe)				

== Phonology ==
The phonology is not certain, but the following has been suggested:

=== Consonants ===
		Labial	Alveolar		Post- alveolar	Palatal	Velar		Glottal
		Labial	Alveolar		Post- alveolar	Palatal	plain	labial	Glottal
Nasal		m	n			ɲ	ŋ		
Plosive	voiceless	p	t				k	kʷ	ʔ
Plosive	voiced	b	d				ɡ	ɡʷ	
Affricate			dz						
Ejective			tsʼ	tɬʼ	tʃʼ		kʼ	kʼʷ	
Fricative		f	s	ɬ			x	xʷ	h
Approximant		w		l		j			

/ɡ/ and /l/ have the allophones [dʒ] and [ɽ] before front vowels. /tʃʼ/ is 'mildly' ejective. Ehret reports that /kʼ/ and /kʼʷ/ are voiced [ɡ, ɡʷ] if a preceding consonant is voiced.

=== Vowels ===
	Front	Back
Close	i	u
Close-mid	e	o
Open	a	
