= Babati =

- City of Manyara Region
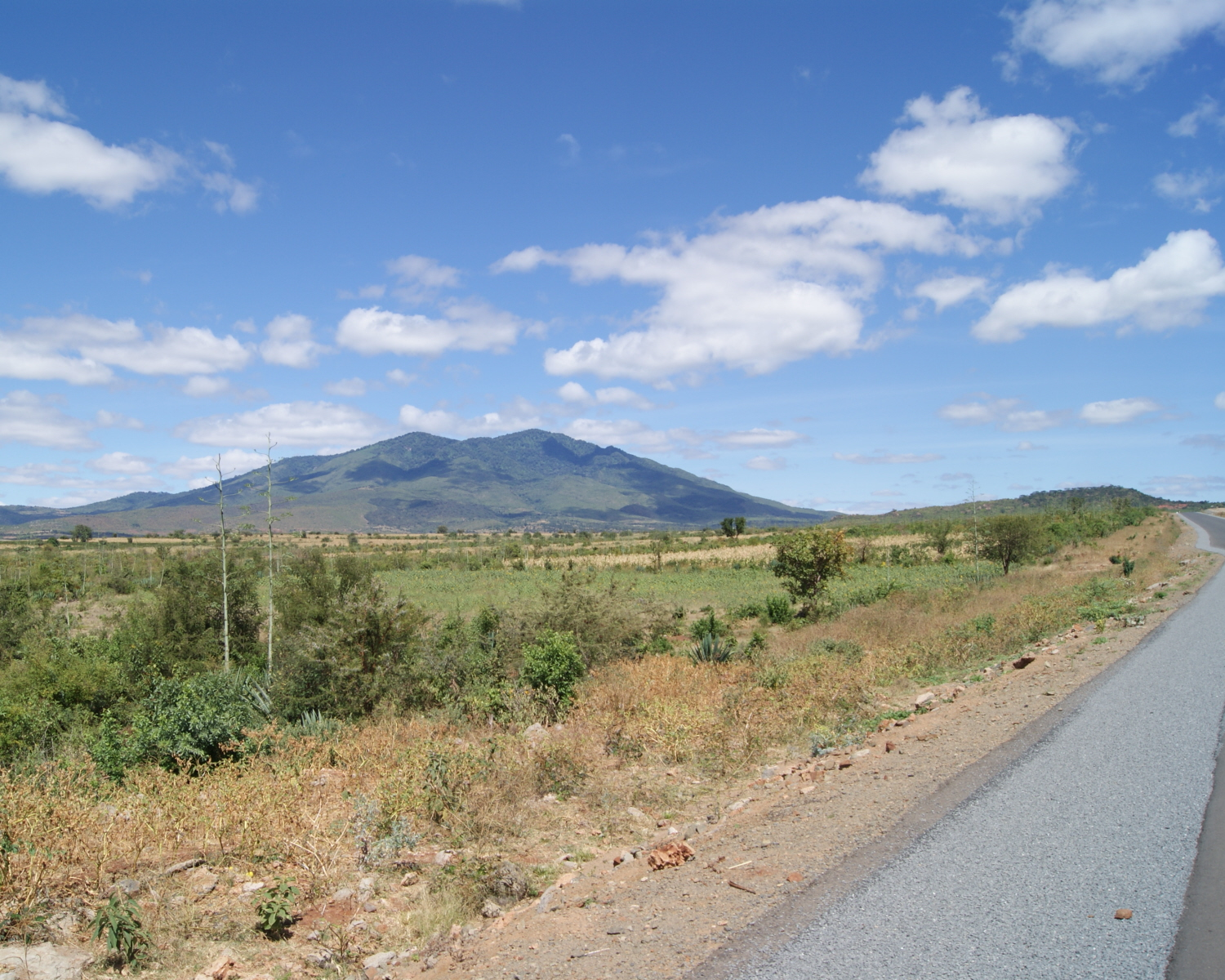
- Mount Kwaraha

- Location in Tanzania
- Coordinates: 4°13′S 35°45′E
- Country: Tanzania
- Region: Manyara
- District: Babati
- Elevation: 2,145 m (7,037 ft)

Population (2022 census)
  - Total: 67,445

Babati is a town in Babati Urban District of Manyara Region of Tanzania. It is the administrative capital of Babati Urban District and Babati Rural District and also the administrative capital of Manyara Region.

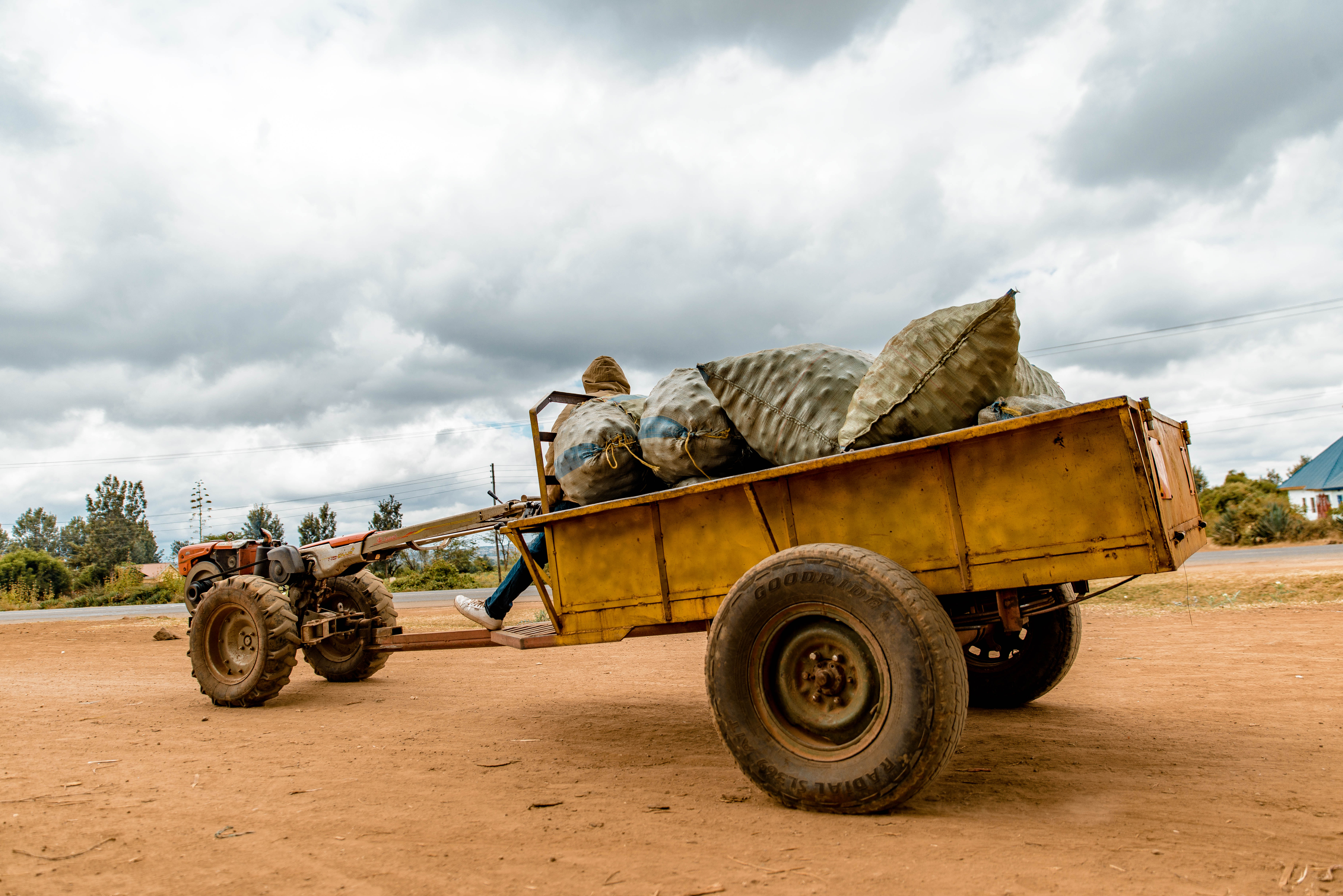
Tractor made and modified in Babati.

Babati town has developed from a mere village since Babati District was established in 1985. The new status boosted the town into rapid growth. The town is located at an altitude of 2,145 metres or 7,037 feet near the end of Tarangire National Park and the base of Lake Babati, nestling under Mount Kwaraha.

== History ==
The story is told that the town's name resulted from misunderstanding a Gorowa boy by a German roadwork supervisor. The boy did not understand the question about the location's name asked by the German. He pointed at an older man and said "Baba ti", meaning in his language "this is my father". The German noted down the name "Babati" as he thought this was the township's name.

It is claimed in the book Tanganyikan Guerilla: East African Campaign 1914-1918, that Napoleon's son, then a colonel in the British Cavalry, died and was interred in Babati.

== Transport ==
The trans-African automobile route — the Cairo-Cape Town Highway passes through Babati.

== See also ==
- Nkaiti
