= Manyara Region =

Region of Tanzania

Manyara Region Mkoa wa Manyara (Swahili)
- Region
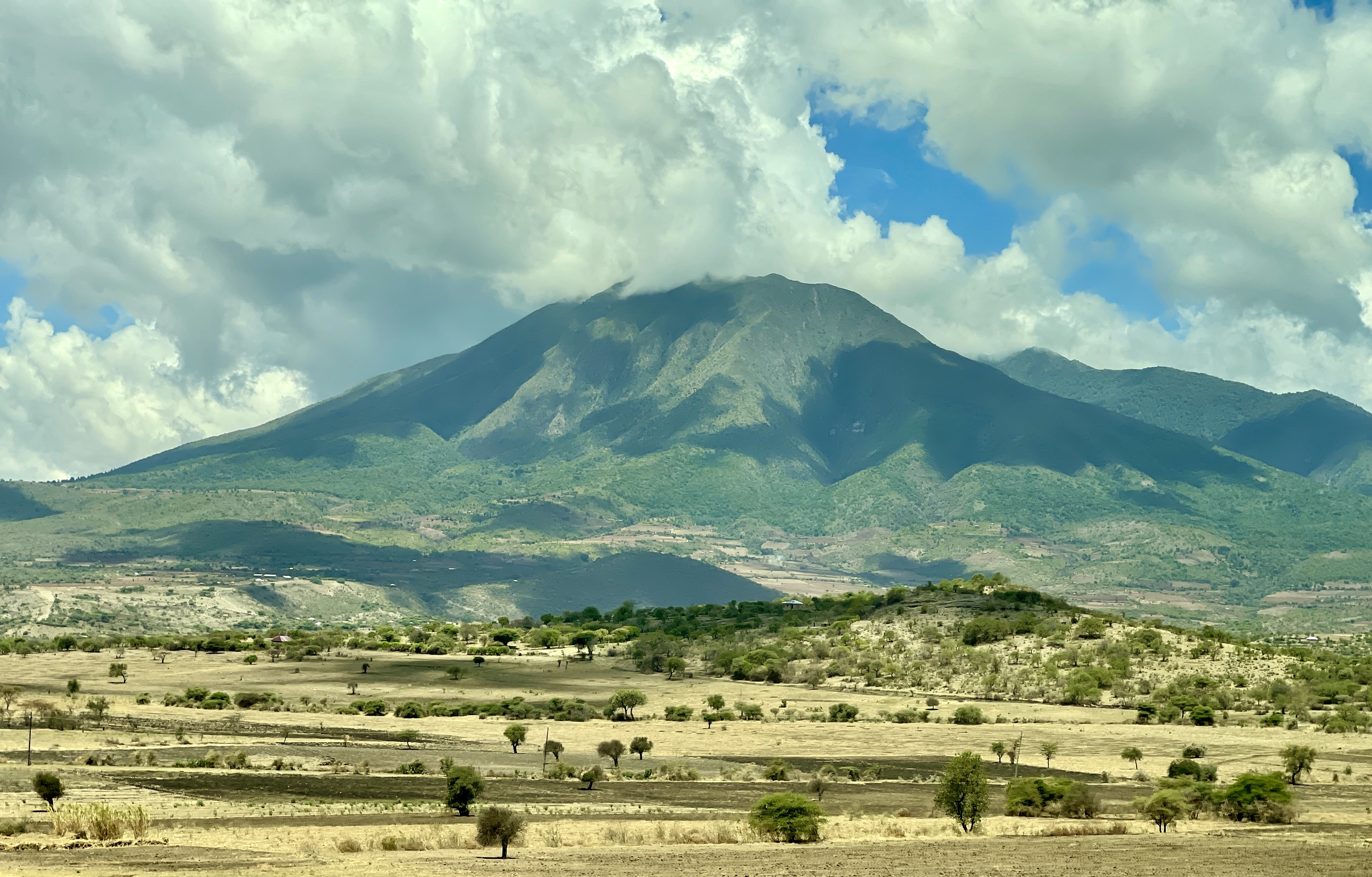
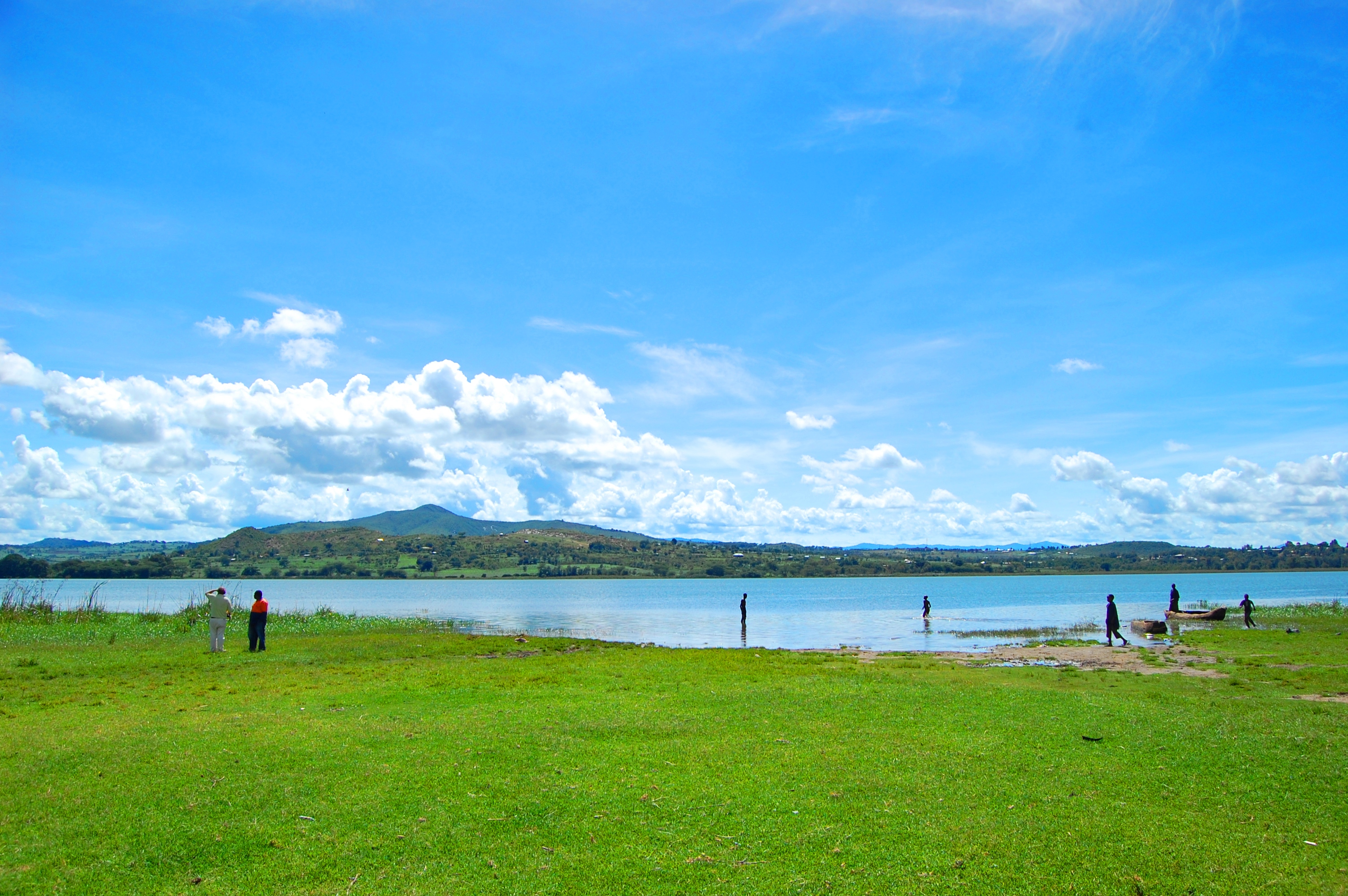
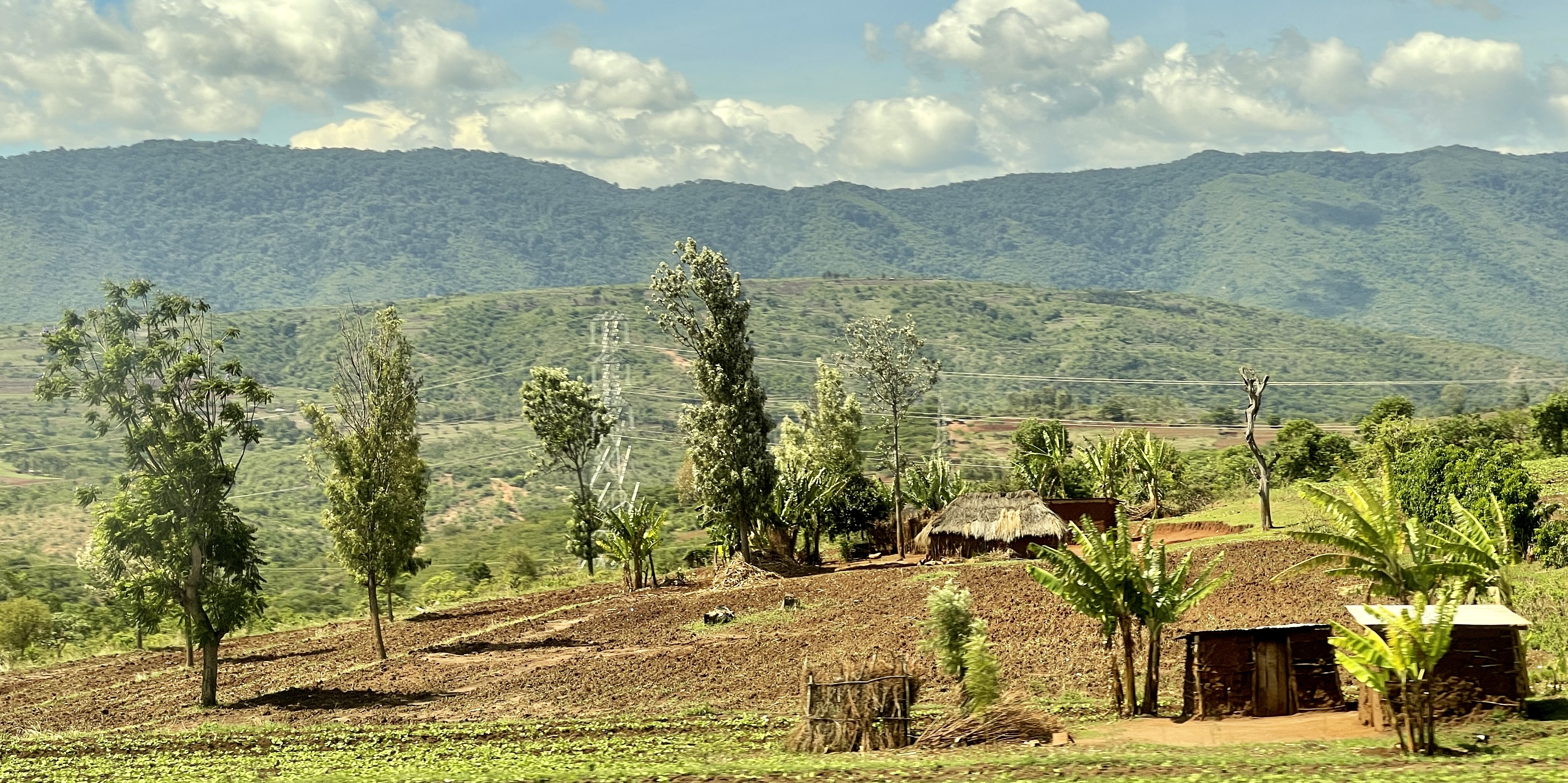
- From top to bottom: Mount Hanang from Mogitu Ward, Lake Babati and Mountain views in Arri Ward
- Nickname: The Tanzanite region; Home of Tanzanite
- Location in Tanzania
- Coordinates: 4°18′54″S 36°57′14.76″E
- Country: Tanzania
- Zone: Northern
- Named for: Lake Manyara
- Capital: Babati
- Districts: List: Babati Urban; Mbulu Urban; Babati District; Hanang District; Kiteto District; Mbulu District; Simanjiro District

Government
  - Regional Commissioner: Queen Sendiga

Area
  - Total: 44,522 km^{2} (17,190 sq mi)
  - Rank: 7th of 31
- Highest elevation (Mount Hanang): 3,418 m (11,214 ft)

Population (2022)
  - Total: 1,892,502
  - Rank: 17th of 31
  - Density: 42.507/km^{2} (110.09/sq mi)
- Demonym: Manyaran

Ethnic groups
  - Settler: Swahili & Maasai
  - Native: Iraqw, Mbugwe, Assa, Barabaig & Gorowa
- Time zone: UTC+3 (EAT)
- Postcode: 27xxx
- Area code: 027
- ISO 3166 code: TZ-26
- HDI (2021): 0.568 medium · 9th of 25
- Website: Official website
- Symbols of Tanzania
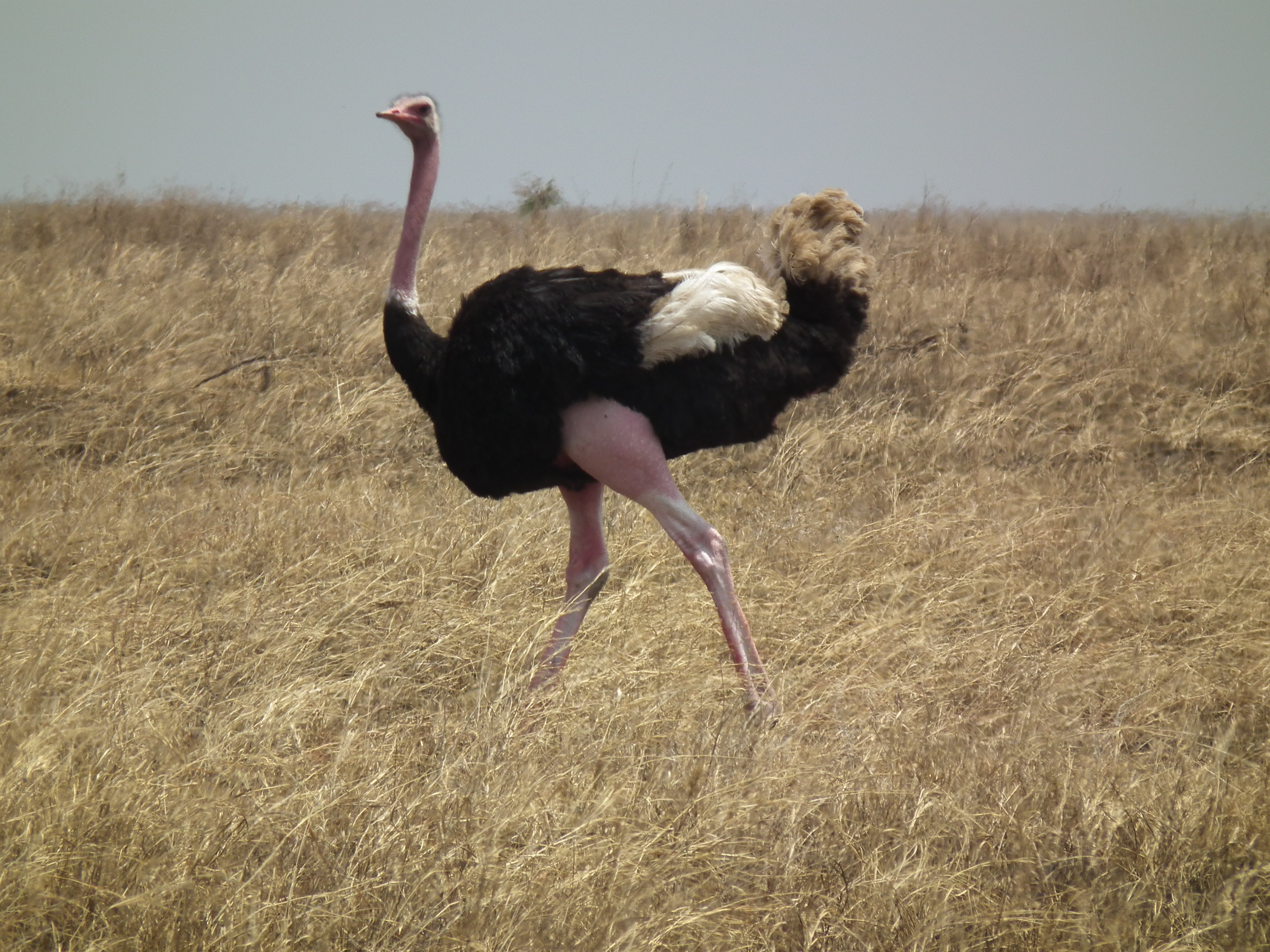
- Bird: Ostrich

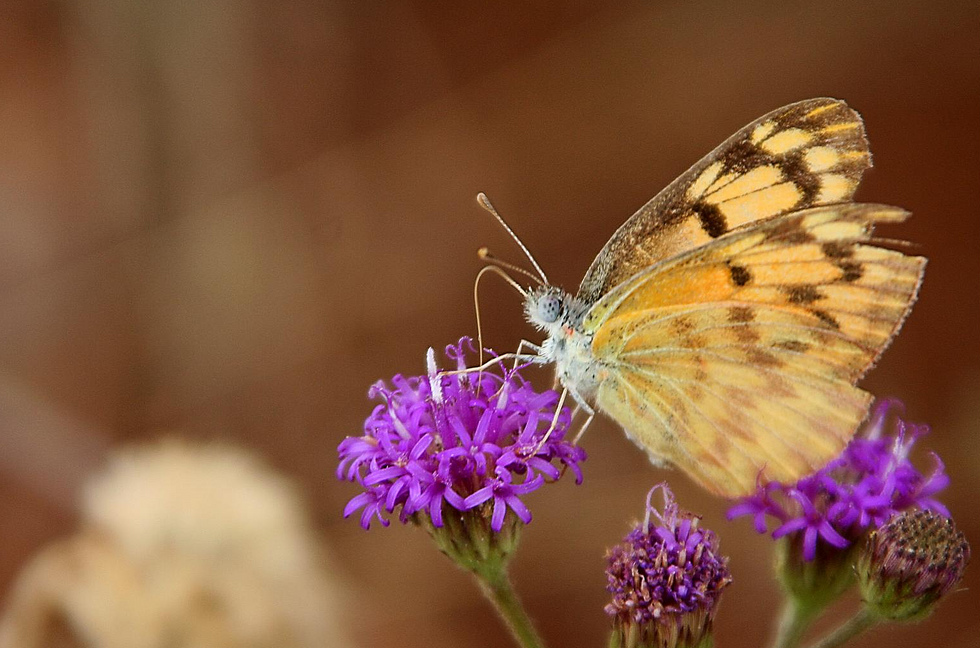
- Butterfly: Colotis aurigineus

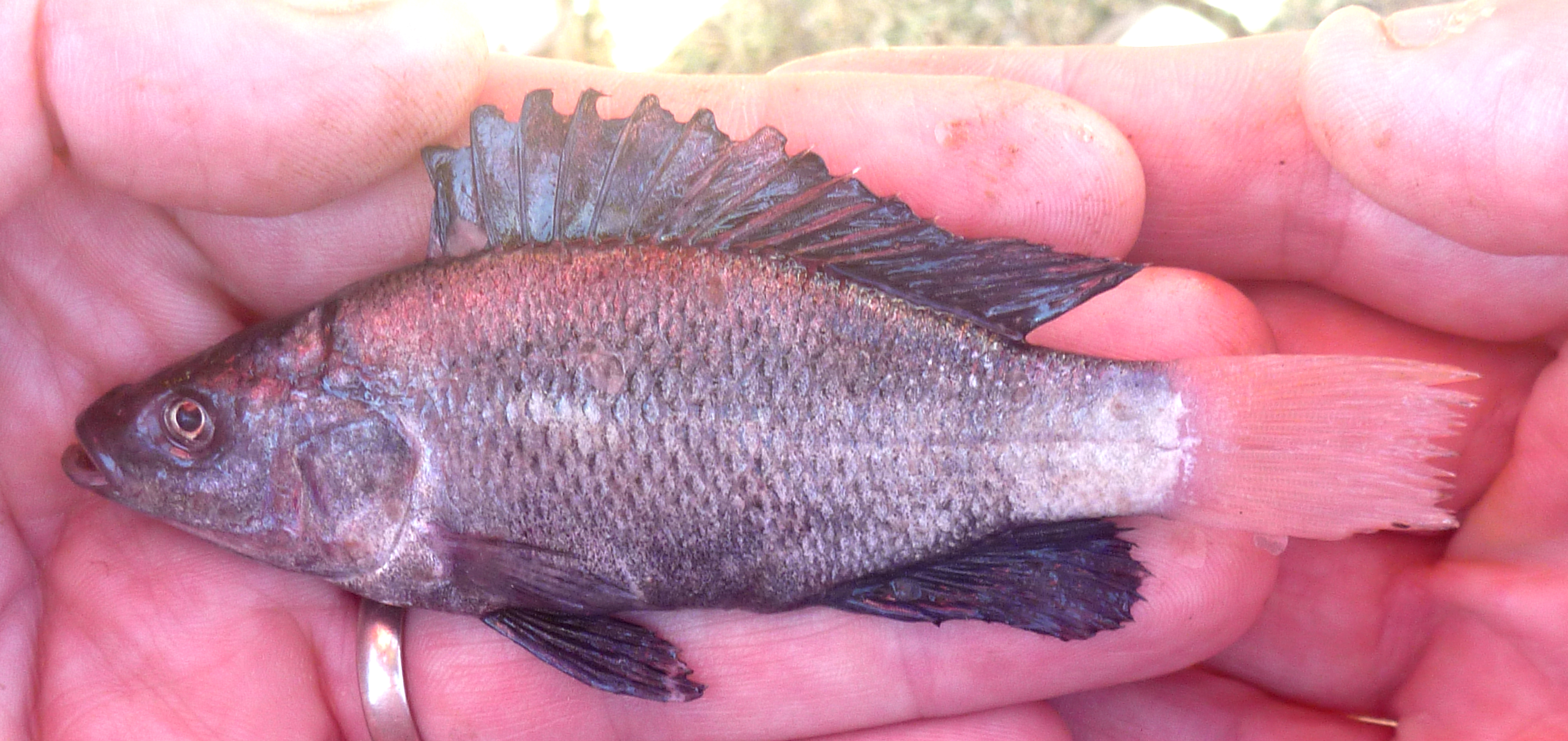
- Fish: Oreochromis amphimelas

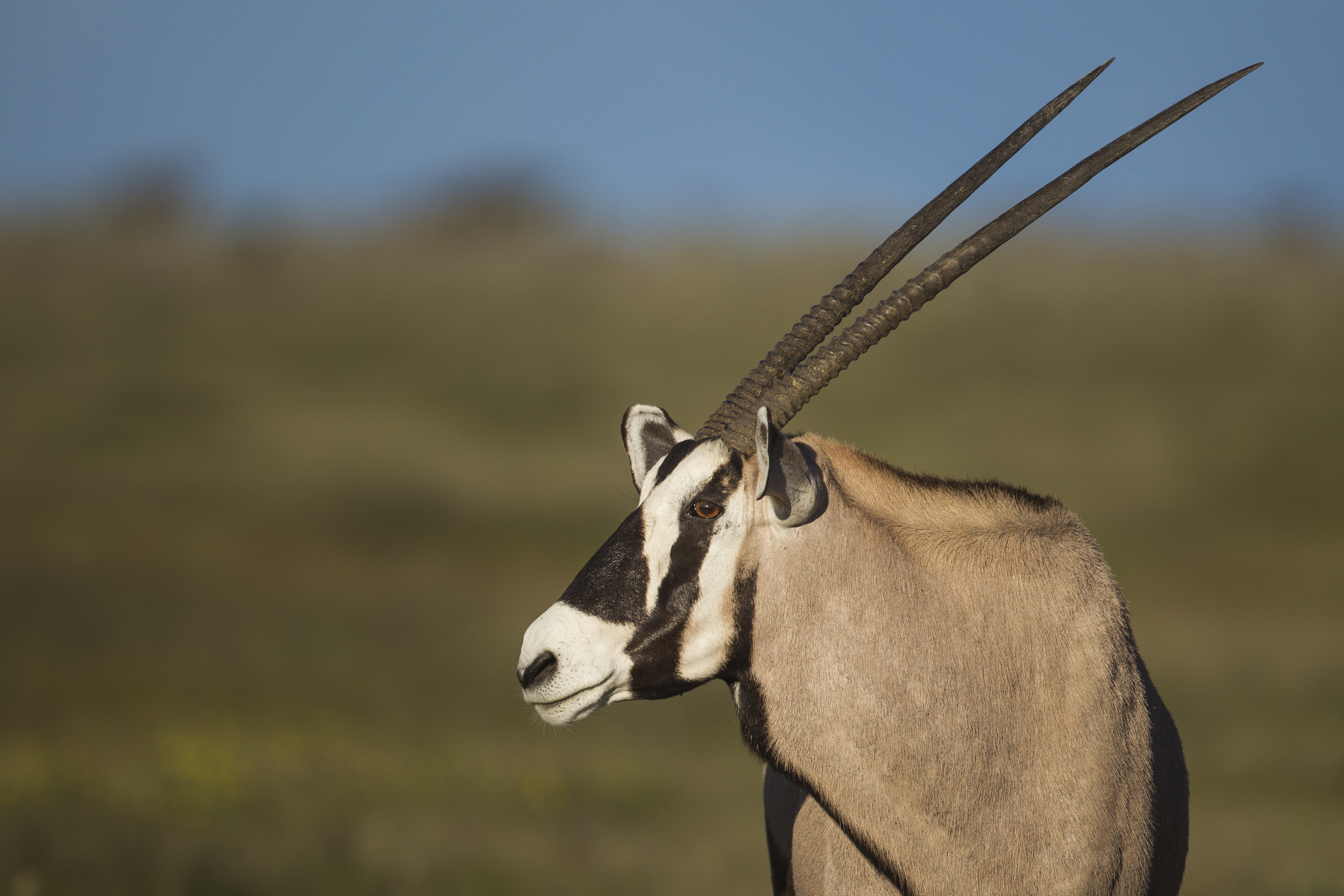
- Mammal: Oryx

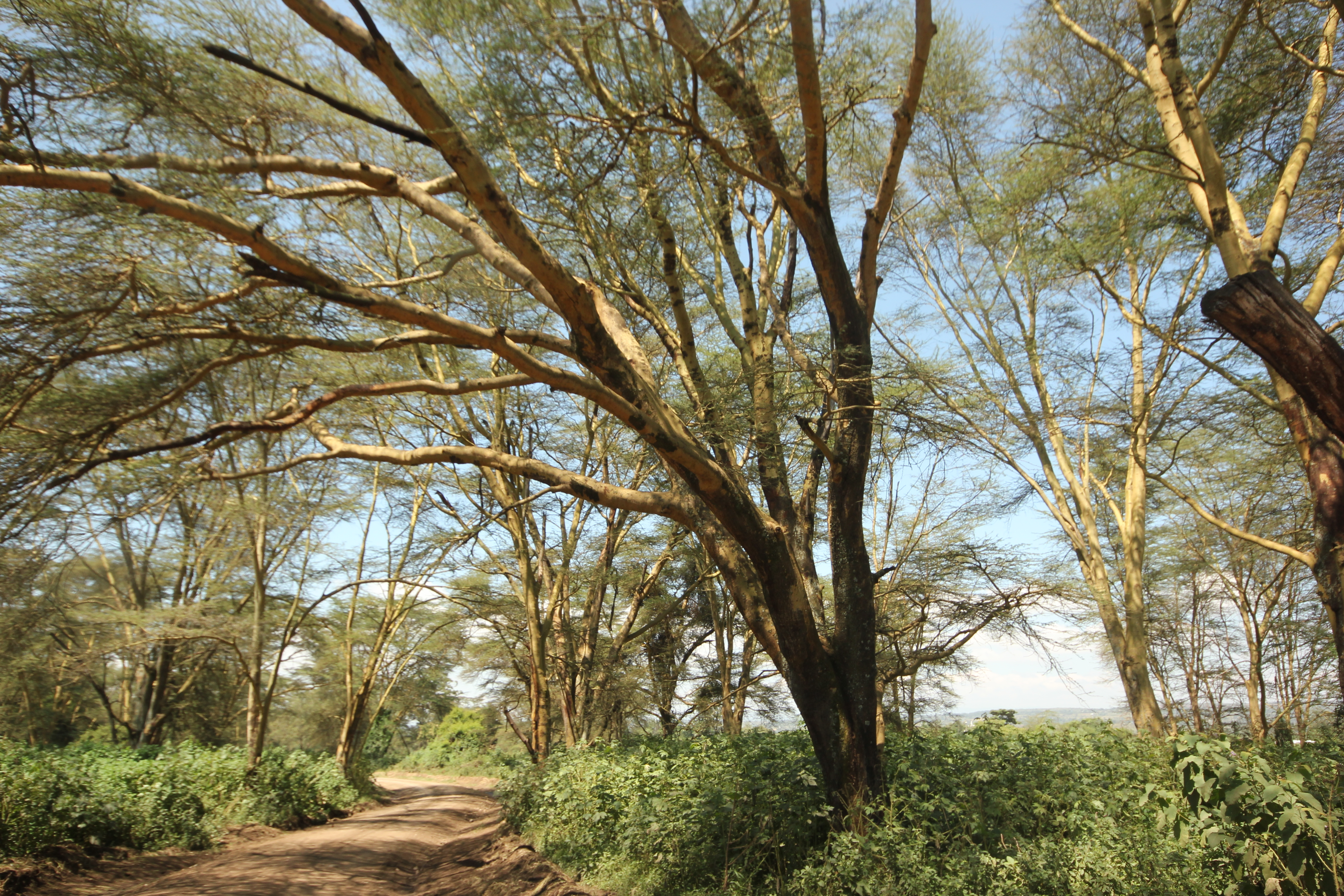
- Tree: Yellow fever acacia

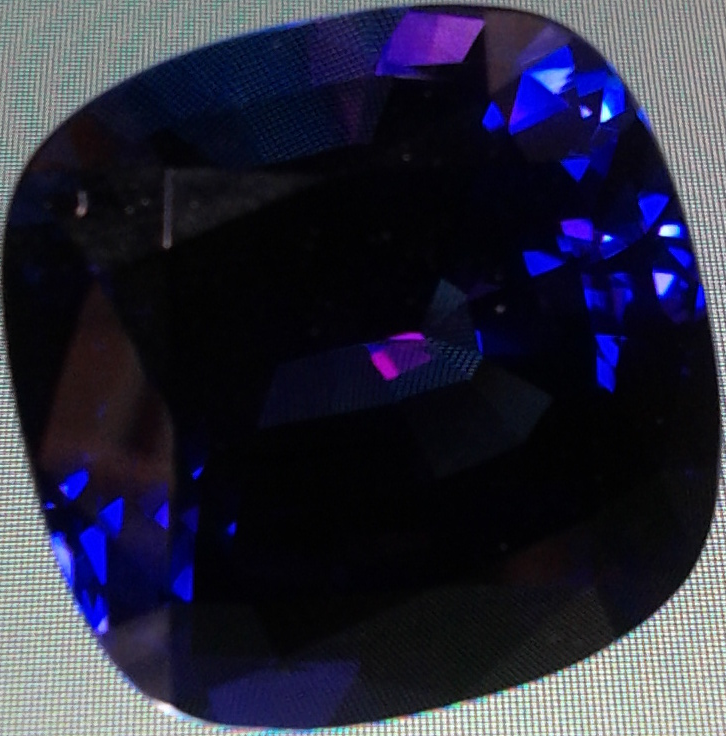
- Mineral: Tanzanite

Manyara Region (Swahili: Mkoa wa Manyara) is one of Tanzania's 31 administrative regions. The regional capital is the town of Babati. According to the 2012 national census, the region had a population of 1,425,131, which was lower than the pre-census projection of 1,497,555. For 2002–2012, the region's 3.2 percent average annual population growth rate was tied for the third highest in the country. It was also the 22nd most densely populated region with 32 people per square kilometre.

== Geography ==
Lake Manyara is in the northern part of the region. It is bordered to the north by the Arusha Region, to the northeast by the Kilimanjaro Region, to the east by the Tanga Region, to the south by the Dodoma Region, to the southeast by the Morogoro Region, to the southwest by the Singida Region, and to the northwest by the Simiyu Region. The highest mountain in the Manyara Region is Mount Hanang.

== Demographics ==
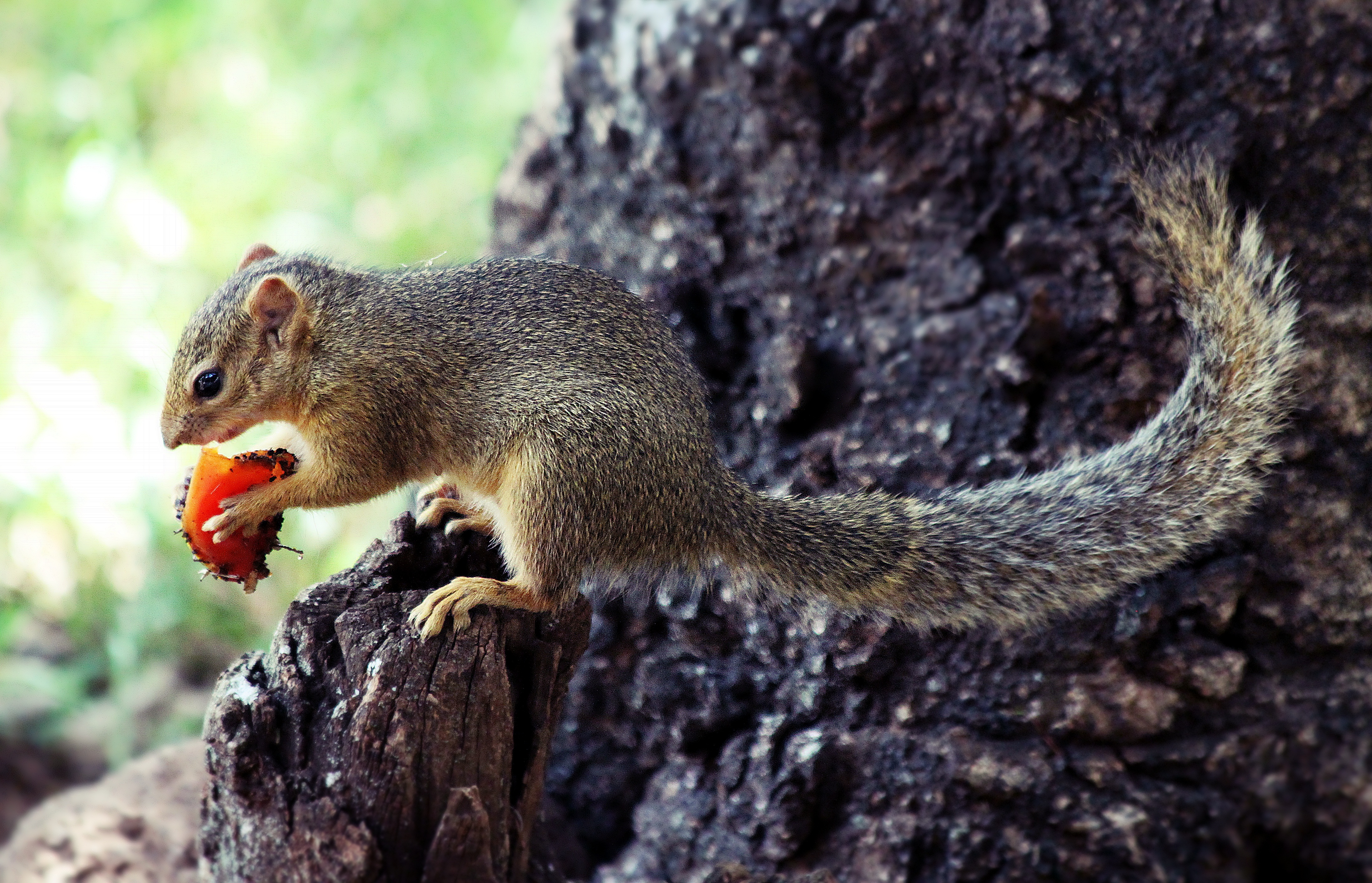
Squirrel eats a fruit in Manyara National Park, Tanzania.

Manyara Region is inhabited by various ethnolinguistic groups and communities. The latter include the Assa, Gorowa, Kw'adza, Mbugwe, Datooga, Maasai and Barabaig and Irakw, which is the largest ethnic group in the region.

== Administration ==
The regional commissioner of the Manyara Region is Queen Curthbet Sendiga .

== Economy ==
Residents of the Manyara Region are mostly farmers. The region's economy is based on the mining of Tanzanite gems on the Mererani Hills in the north on the border with the Arusha Region. Other sources of income are from tourism in the Tarangire National Park, which is entirely located in the region, and Lake Manyara National Park.

== Transport ==
=== Road ===
One paved road passes through the western part of Manyara Region. Paved trunk road T14 from Singida connects with trunk road T5 in Babati town. Trunk road T5 from Dodoma to Arusha passes through the region; it is paved from Arusha up to Dodoma.

== Administrative divisions ==
=== Districts ===
Manyara Region is divided into six districts, each administered by a council:

Districts of Manyara Region
| Map | District | Population (2012 Census) |
|---|---|---|
| | Babati District | 312,392 |
| | Babati Town | 93,108 |
| | Hanang District | 275,990 |
| | Kiteto District | 244,669 |
| | Mbulu District | 320,279 |
| | Simanjiro District | 178,693 |
| | Total | 1,425,131 |

== Notable people ==
- Gabriel Geay, Long distance runner, national record in Marathon from Babati District
- John Stephen Akhwari, Athlete from Mbulu District, Manyara
- Zakayo Malekwa, Athlete, Javelin national record holder
- Fabiano Joseph Nassi, Athlete from Babati, Manyara.
- Gidamis Shahanga, Athlete from Katesh, Hanang District, Manyara
- Frederick Sumaye, 7th Tanzanian Prime Minister

== See also ==
- List of protected areas of Tanzania
