= Hombolo Dam =

Dam in Tanzania

- Location within Tanzania Location within Africa Location within Earth
- Country: Tanzania
- Location: Hombolo
- Coordinates: 05°57′00″S 35°58′10″E
- Status: Active
- Opening date: 1957

Reservoir
- Surface area: 15.4 km^{2} (5.9 sq mi)
- Normal elevation: 100 m (330 ft)
- Website www.kilimo.go.tz

Hombolo Dam is a dam in Tanzania. It is at Hombolo-Bwawani village, in Dodoma-rural District. The dam was constructed by the colonial government in 1957 for irrigation, domestic water supply, and water for livestock.

== Overview ==
The dam serves the following villages: Hombolo-Bwawani, Zepisa, Mahomanyika, Chanzaga, Ngaegae, Mleche, Ghambala, and Ipala; the word bwawani in Swahili literally means "to the dam" or "into the dam." During its construction the nearest village with government offices, including a dispensary, was Hombolo hence the name Hombolo dam. The people in many nearby villages were displaced and moved to other villages during the construction of the dam, including Zepisa, during ujamaa villages exercise hence the near disappearance of these villages, but many of the villages' inhabitants have since moved back.
