= Government City (Dodoma) =

Capital of Tanzania

Government City Mji wa Serikali (Swahili)
- City
- Nickname: Magufuli City (Mji wa Magufuli)
- Location within Tanzania Location within Africa Location within Earth
- Coordinates: 6.124964°S 35.921649°E
- Country: Tanzania
- Region: Dodoma Region
- Ward: Ihumwa; Mtumba
- Incorporated: April 2019
- Founder: John Magufuli

Area
  - Total: 617.15 ha (1,525.0 acres)
- Website: www.dodomacc.go.tz

Mtumba Government City in Dodoma, Tanzania is a settlement established by former president John Magufuli that will serve as the seat of the national government. Magufuli died in office in 2021. It will host all the ministry buildings, diplomatic enclave, government houses and the judiciary. It is located 17 km east of the city centre and it was known as Magufuli City during the construction and development phase. The project costed $4.7 billion in the first phase. The second phase of the project costed Tsh 675 billion ($259 million).

== Mtumba Government City ==
The administrative capital area has been planned in detail and is officially named Mtumba Government City by The President of the URT H.E. Dr. Samia Suluhu Hassan, during the inauguration ceremony that took place on 30th October, 2026 in Dodoma City.

Buildings are under construction in 2024.
