= List of diplomatic missions in Tanzania =

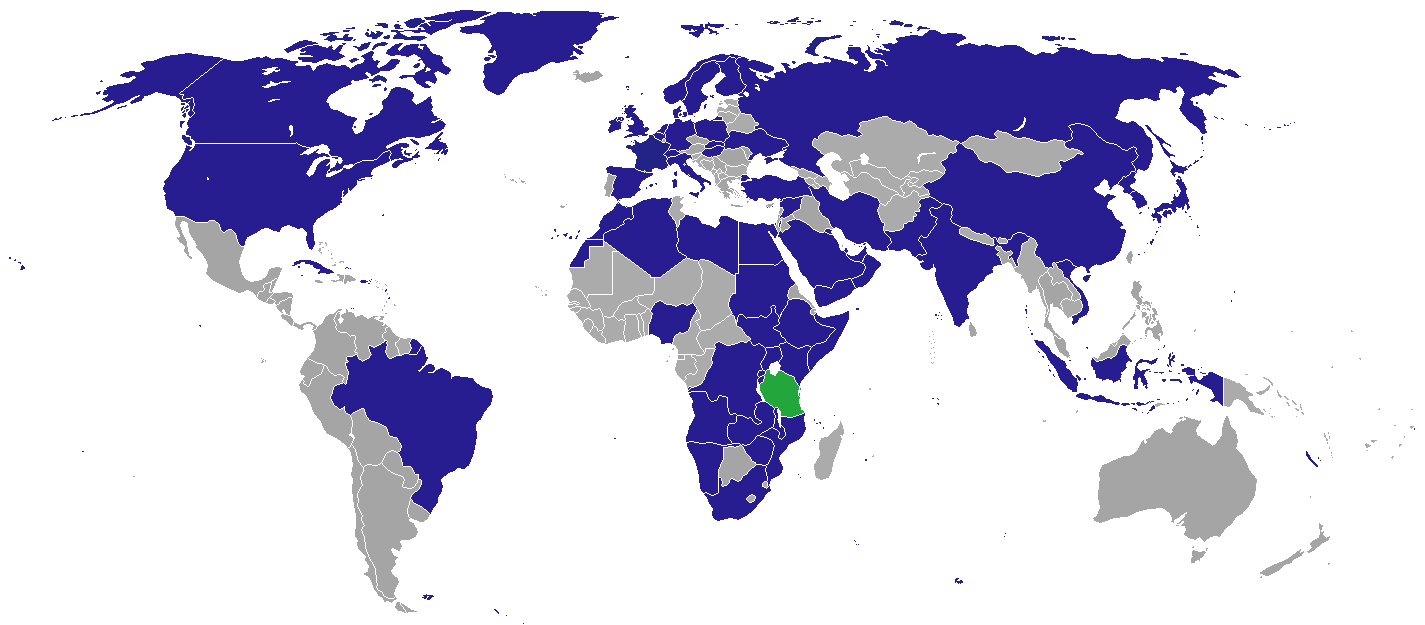
Map of diplomatic missions in Tanzania

This is a list of diplomatic missions in Tanzania. At present, 64 nations maintain diplomatic missions to Tanzania in Dar es Salaam, the former capital and the nation's largest city. The capital, Dodoma, hosts 1 embassy, 4 liaison offices of embassies/high commissions. Many other countries have their ambassadors accredited to Tanzania, with most being resident in Nairobi or Addis Ababa.

The Ministry of Foreign Affairs maintains the official list. This listing excludes honorary consulates.

== Diplomatic missions in Dar es Salaam ==
=== Embassies and High Commissions ===
1. Algeria
2. Angola
3. Belgium
4. Brazil
5. Burundi
6. Canada
7. China
8. Comoros
9. Congo-Kinshasa
10. Cuba
11. Denmark
12. Egypt
13. Ethiopia
14. Finland
15. France
16. Germany
17. Holy See
18. Hungary
19. India
20. Indonesia
21. Iran
22. Ireland
23. Italy
24. Japan
25. Kenya
26. Kuwait
27. Libya
28. Malawi
29. Morocco
30. Mozambique
31. Namibia
32. Netherlands
33. Nigeria
34. Norway
35. North Korea
36. Oman
37. Pakistan
38. Palestine
39. Poland
40. Qatar
41. Russia
42. Rwanda
43. Sahrawi Republic
44. Saudi Arabia
45. Slovakia
46. Somalia
47. South Africa
48. South Korea
49. South Sudan
50. Spain
51. Sudan
52. Sweden
53. Switzerland
54. Syria
55. Turkey
56. Uganda
57. Ukraine
58. United Arab Emirates
59. United Kingdom
60. United States
61. Vietnam
62. Yemen
63. Zambia
64. Zimbabwe

=== Other Missions ===
- European Union (Delegation)

=== Gallery ===
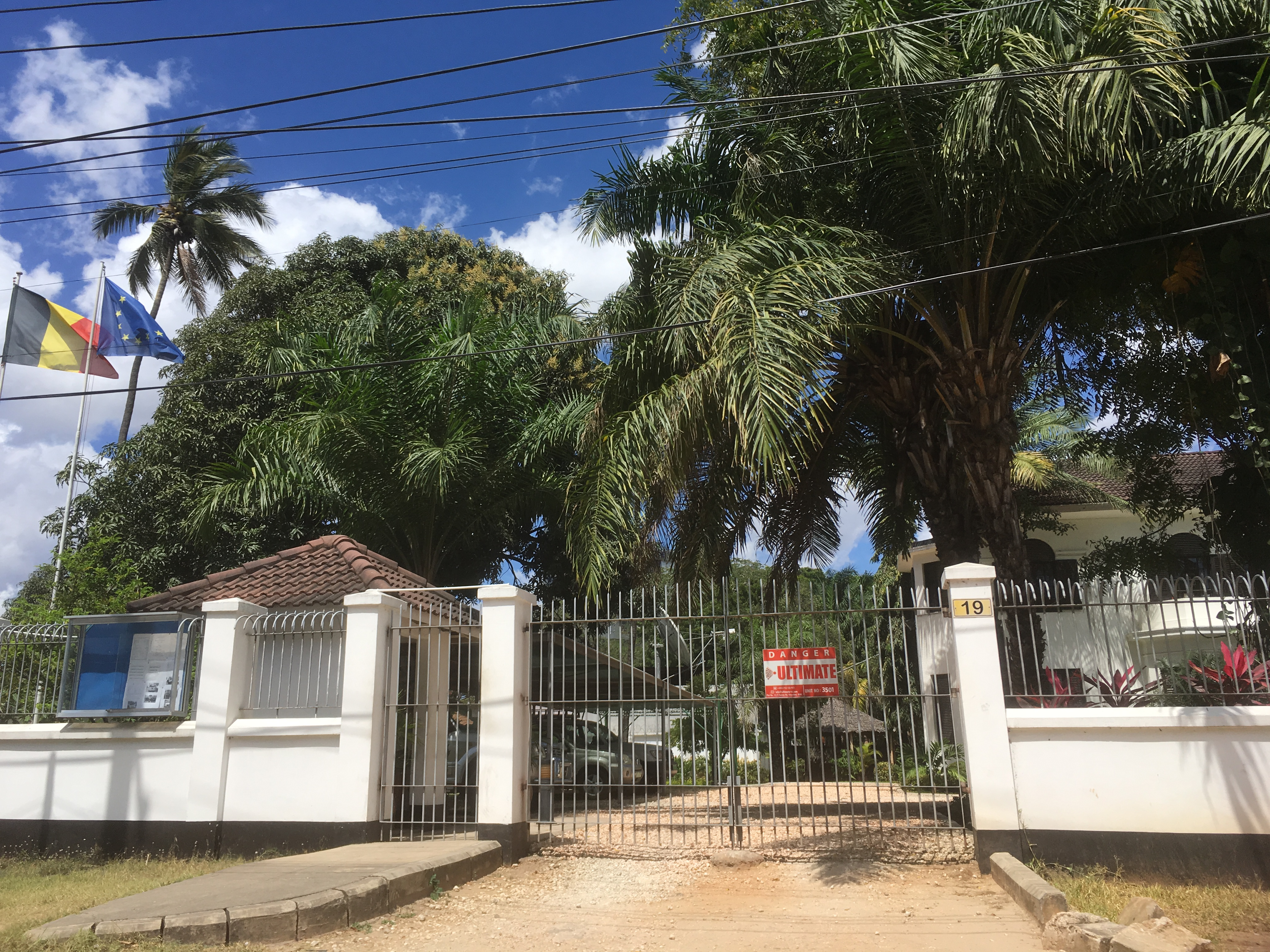
Embassy of Belgium

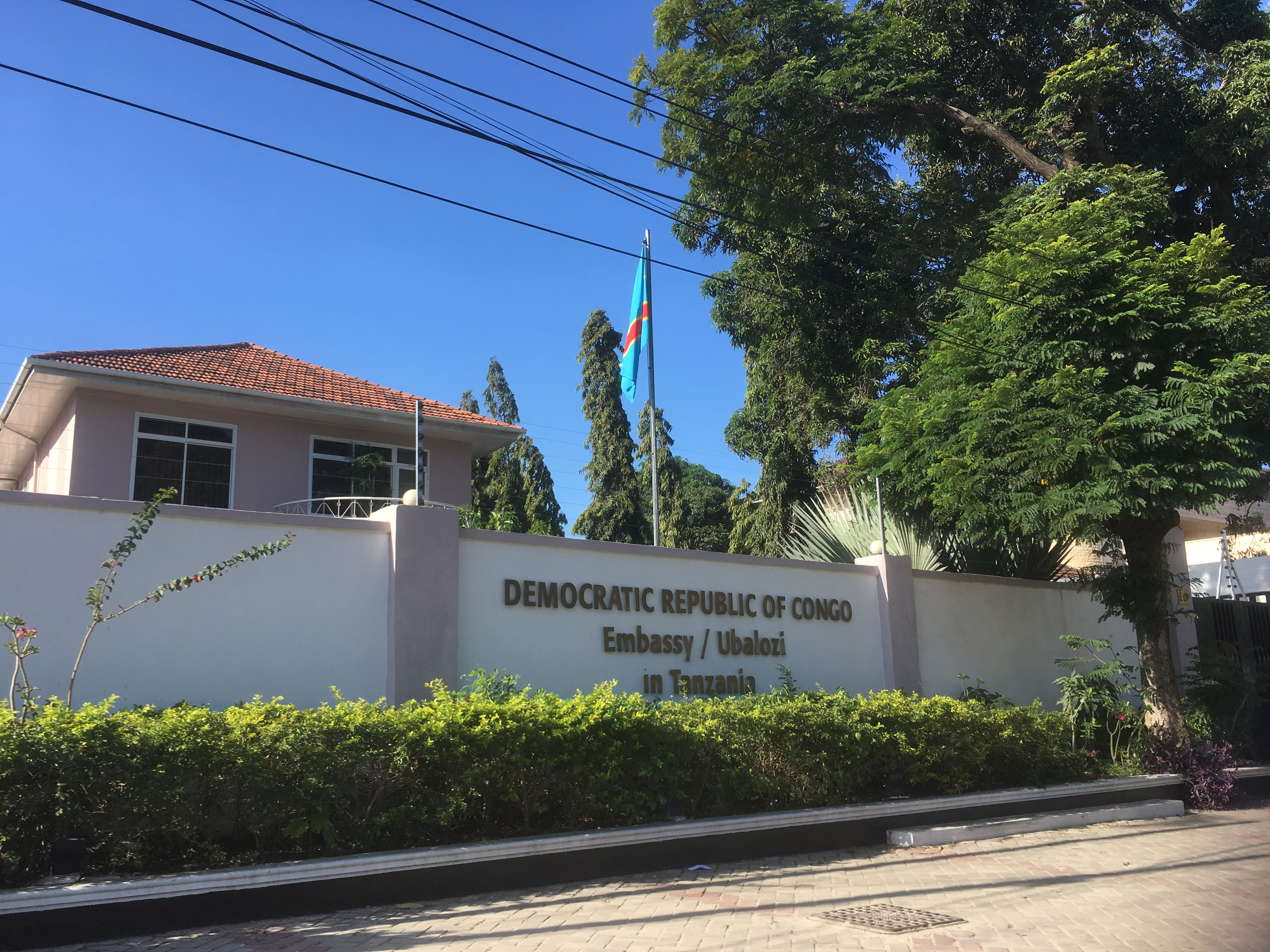
Embassy of Congo-Kinshasa

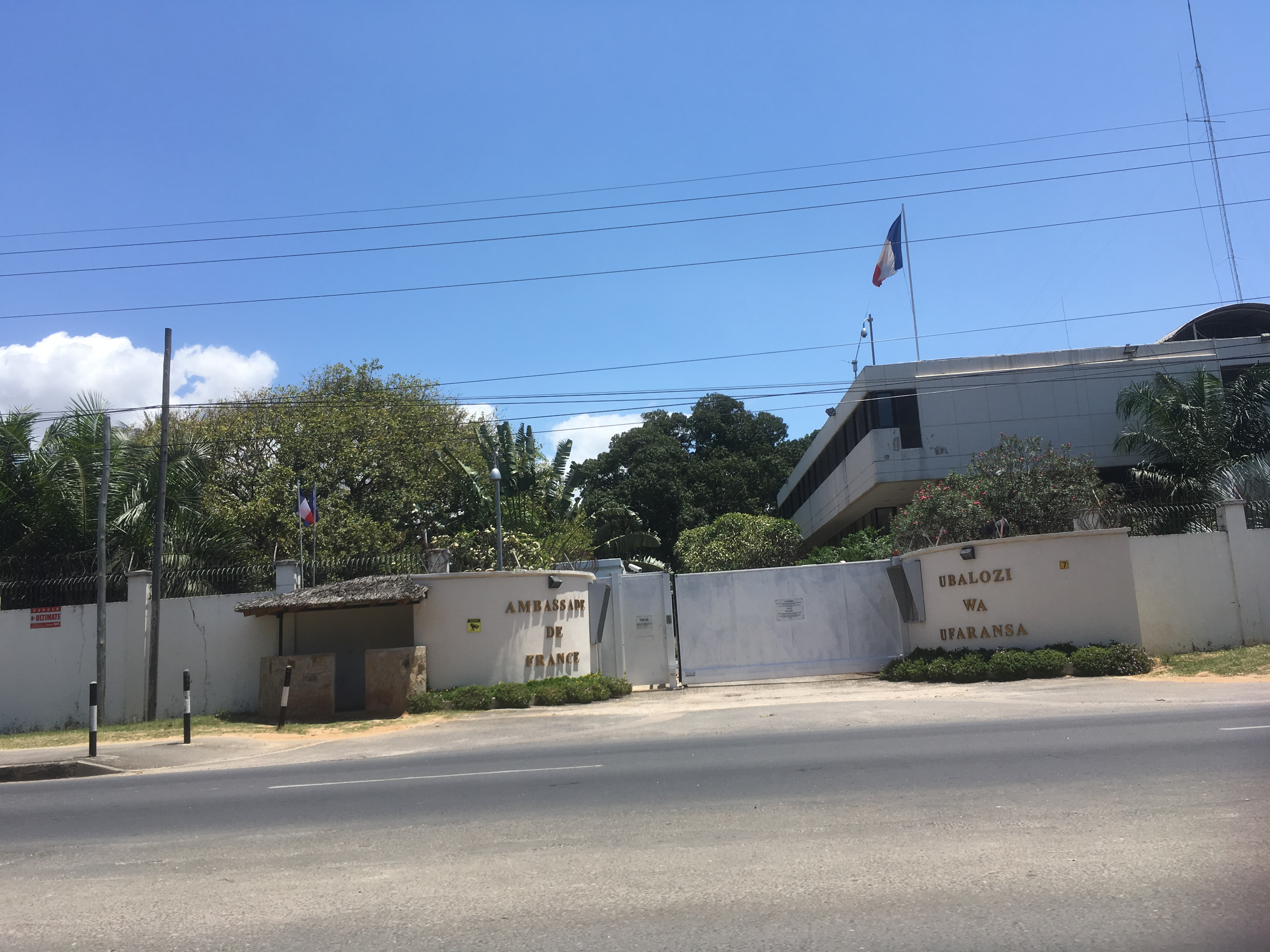
Embassy of France

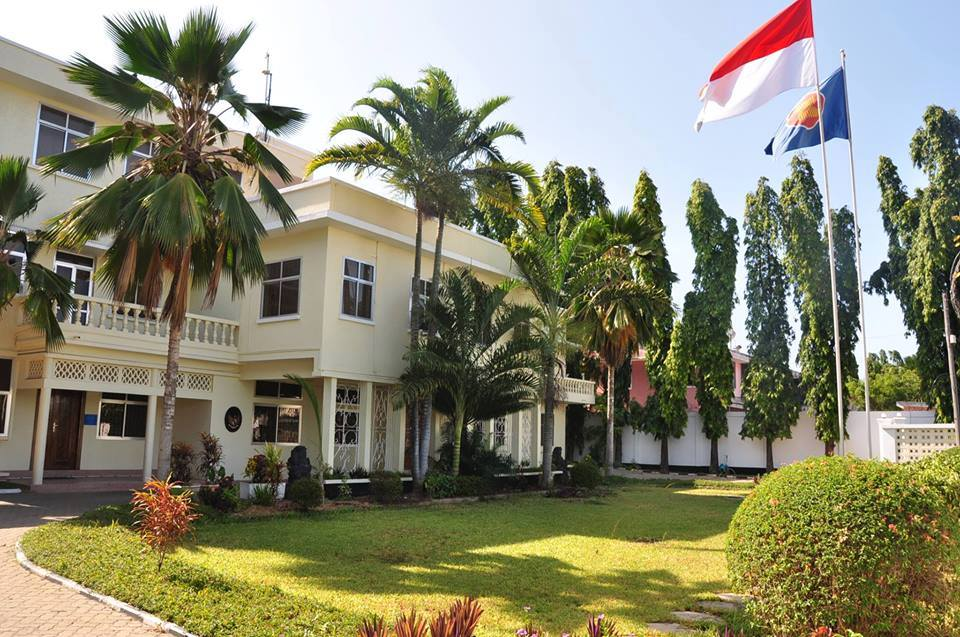
Embassy of Indonesia

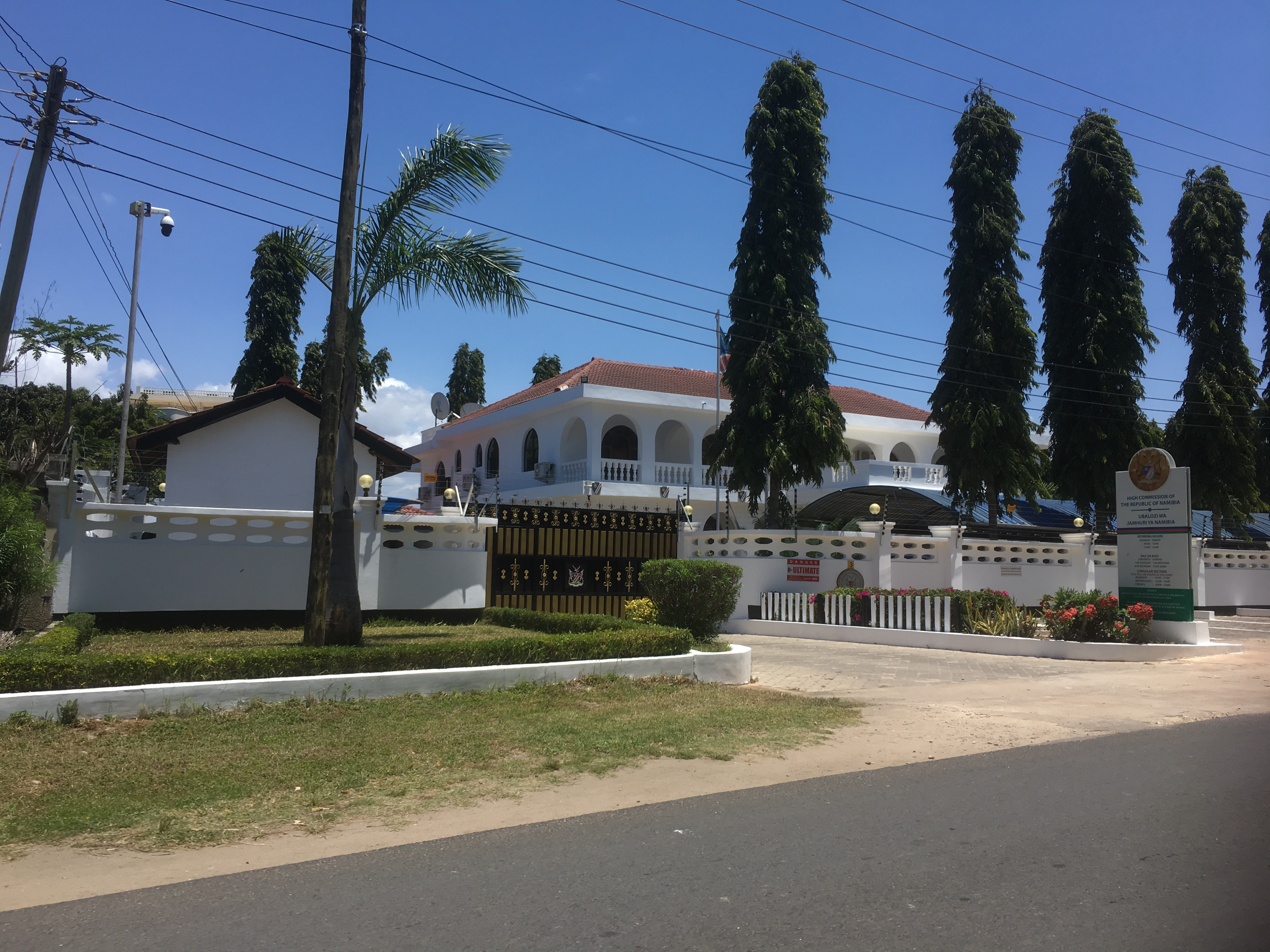
High Commission of Namibia

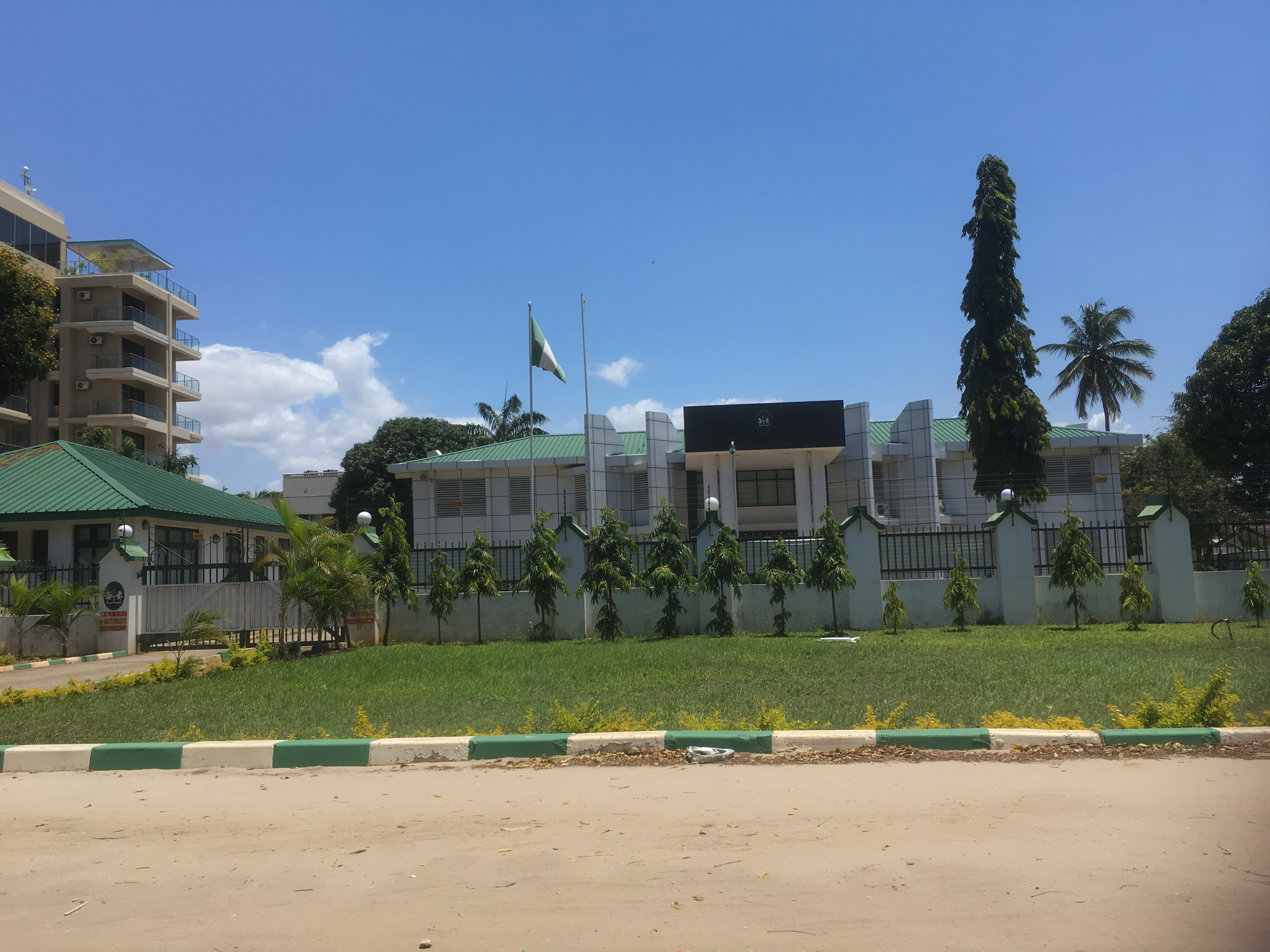
High Commission of Nigeria

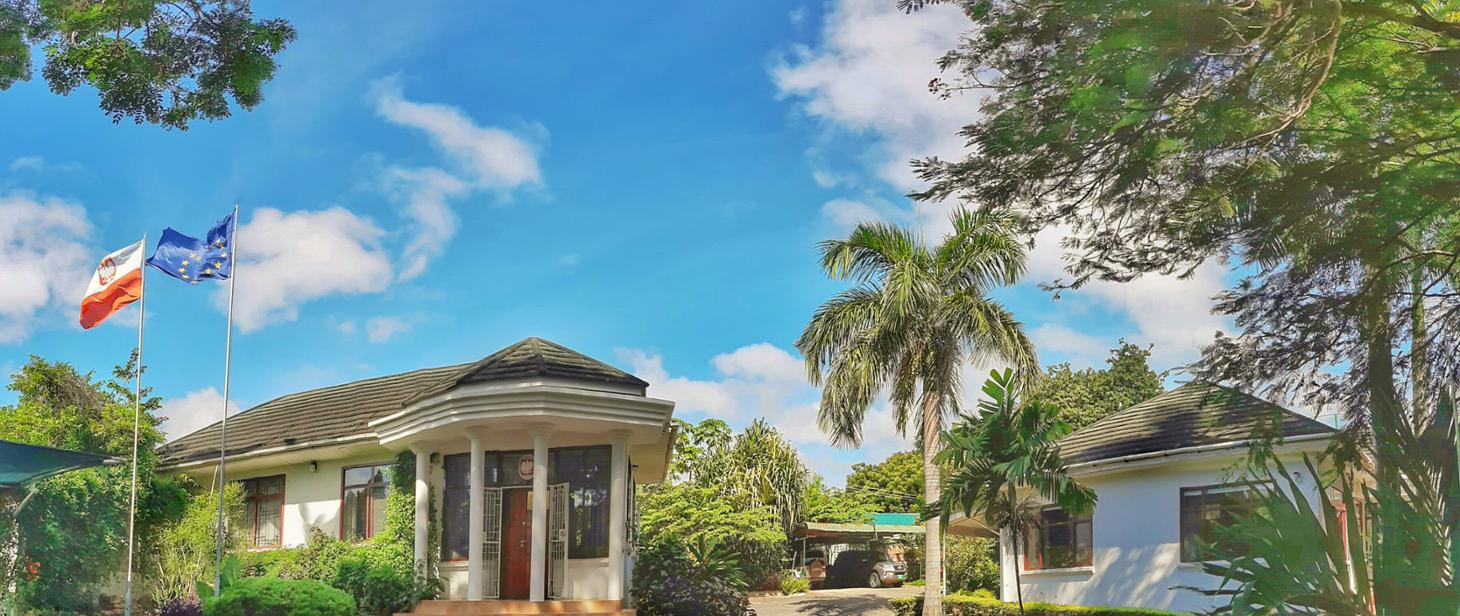
Embassy of Poland

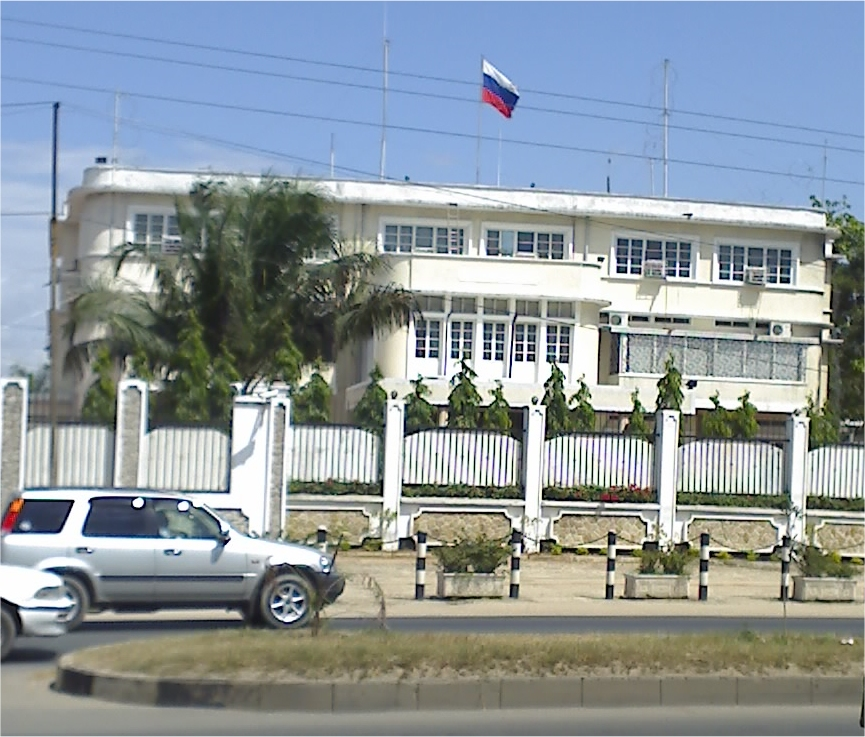
Embassy of Russia

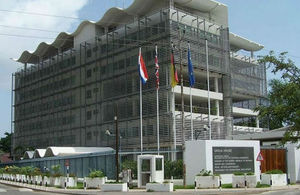
Umoja House hosting missions of the EU, Germany, Netherlands and the U.K.

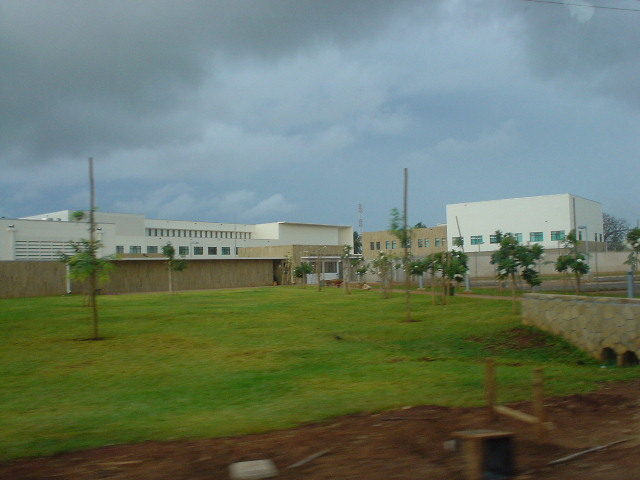
Embassy of the United States

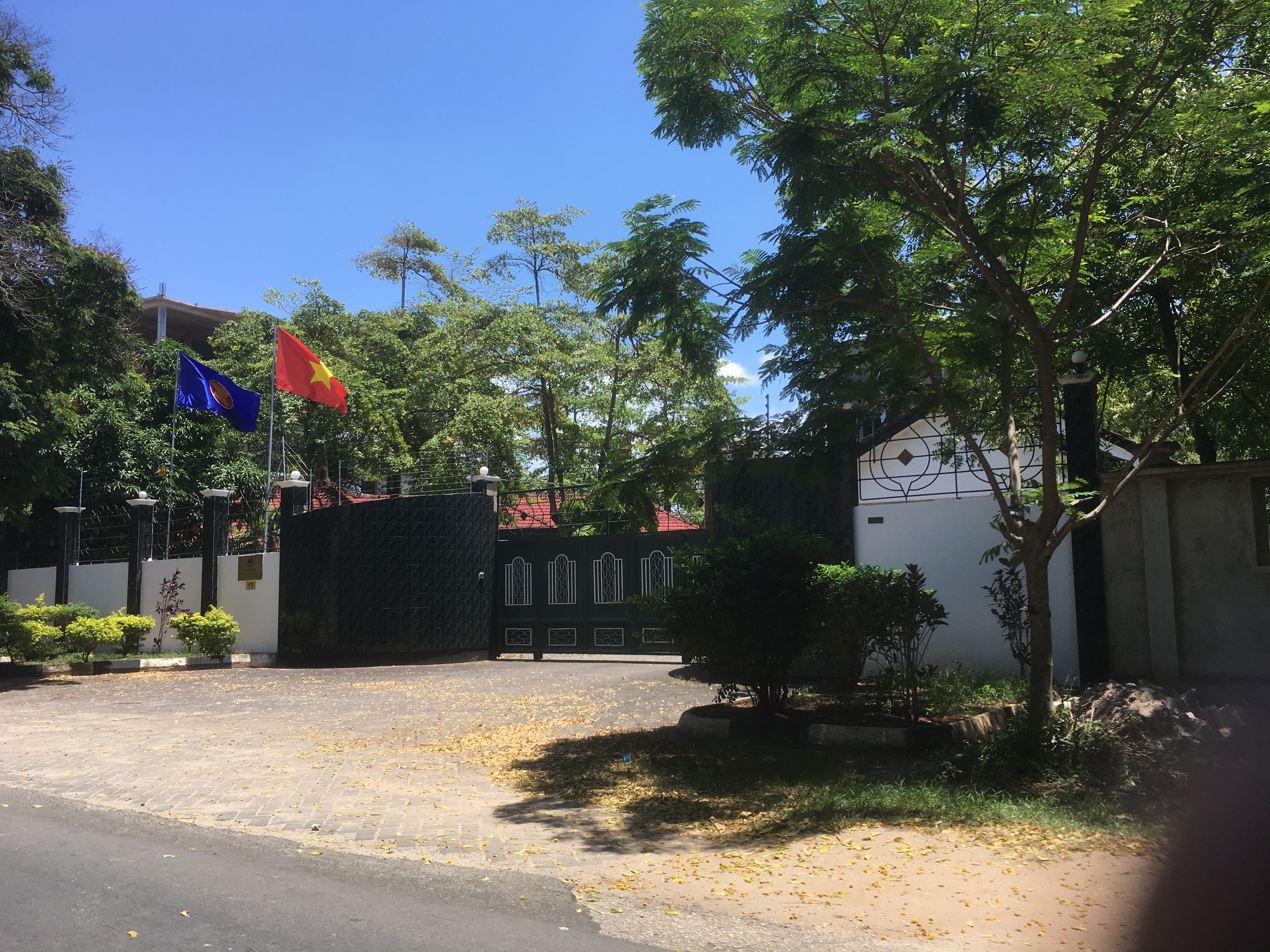
Embassy of Vietnam

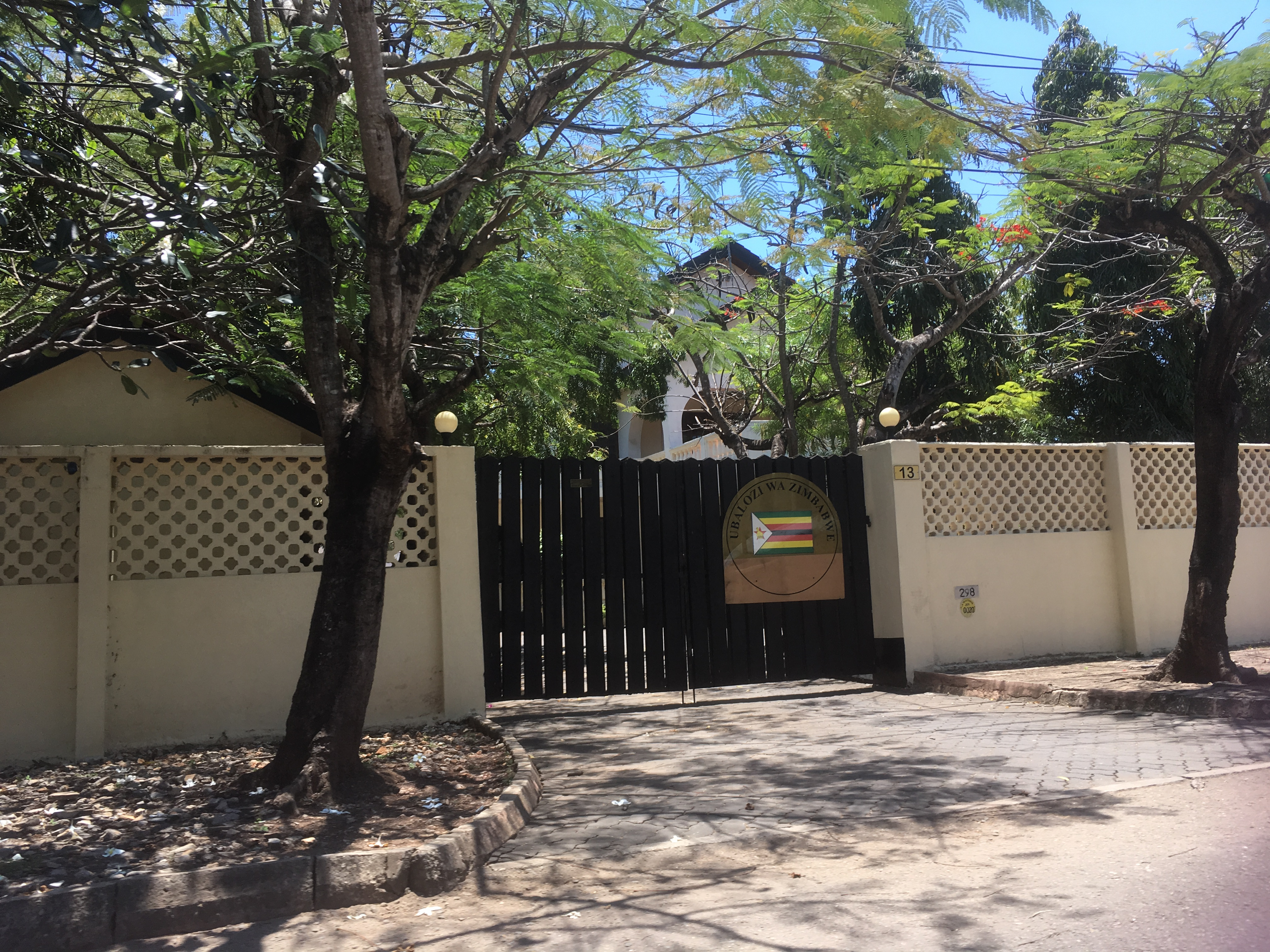
Embassy of Zimbabwe

== Dodoma ==
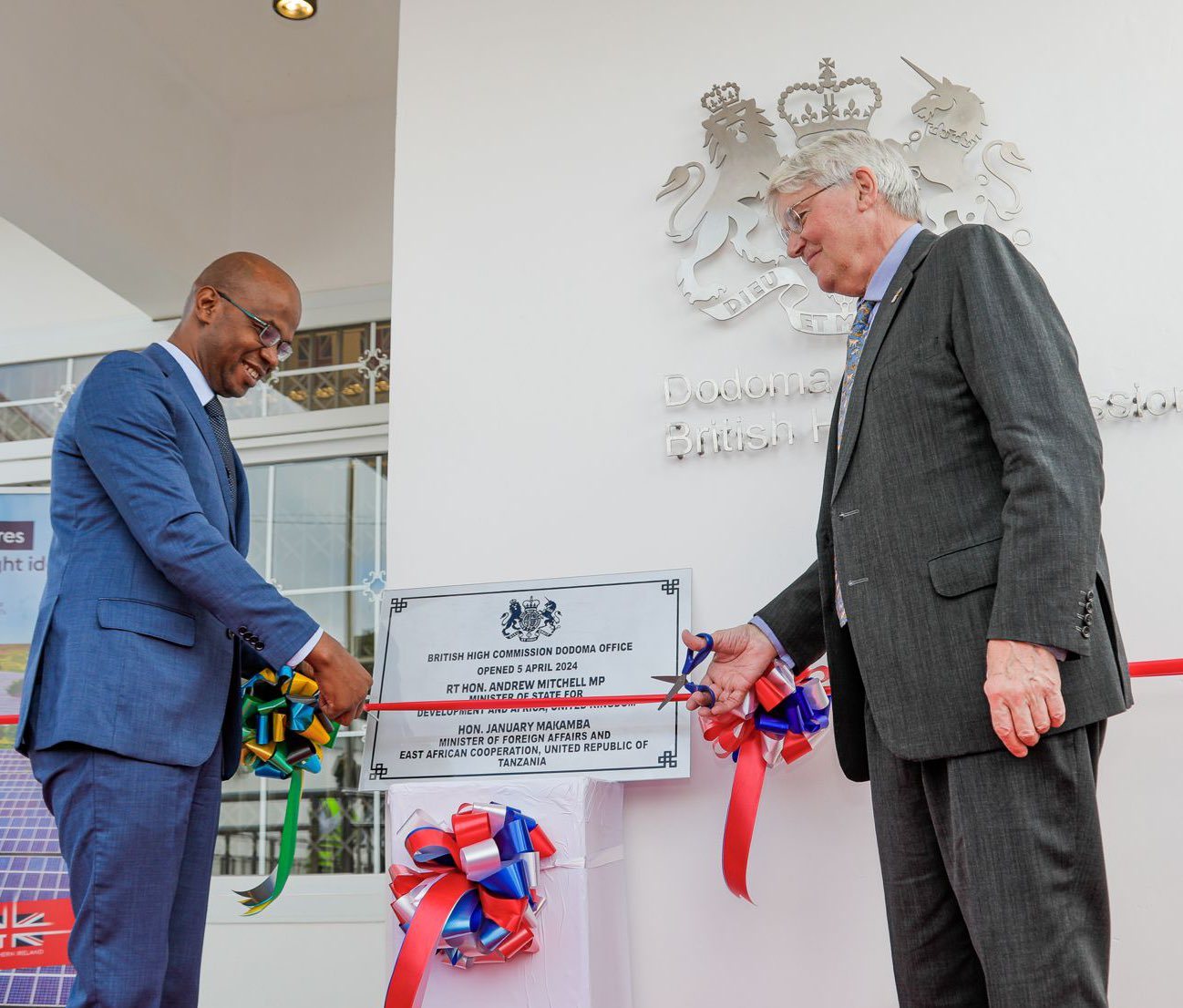
British High Commission, Dodoma Office

- China (Dodoma Office)
- France (Dodoma Office)
- Germany (Liaison Office)
- Serbia (Embassy)
- United Kingdom (Dodoma Office)

In July 2018, President John Magufuli offered each of the resident diplomatic missions 5.5 acres (2.2 ha) of land at the Government City area in the new capital Dodoma in order to encourage relocation. By February 2021, only ten countries had collected the title deeds. Some diplomats estimate it may take them up to 20 years to relocate. In January 2023, President Samia Suluhu Hassan appealed to the diplomatic community to benefit from the incentives that the government was offering before it expires.

As of February 2023, Uganda, Zambia and Zimbabwe have commenced construction of their new offices. On 17 May 2024, Ethiopia laid the cornerstone for the construction of its embassy. Both the Holy See and Indonesia have declared their intention to relocate to Dodoma.

== Consular missions ==
=== Arusha ===
- Burundi (Liaison office)
- Kenya
- Uganda

=== Kigoma ===
- Burundi
- Congo-Kinshasa

=== Zanzibar City ===
- China
- India
- Mozambique
- Oman
- United Arab Emirates

== Non-Resident Embassies and High Commissions ==
Resident in Addis Ababa, Ethiopia:

- Eswatini
- Ghana
- Ivory Coast
- Lesotho
- Liberia
- Mali
- Niger
- Senegal
- Serbia

Resident in Nairobi, Kenya:

- Argentina
- Australia
- Austria
- Bangladesh
- Barbados
- Chile
- Colombia
- Cyprus
- Czechia
- Eritrea
- Greece
- Iraq
- Israel
- Jordan
- Malaysia
- Mexico
- Philippines
- Romania
- Sierra Leone
- Sri Lanka
- Thailand

Resident in Pretoria, South Africa:

- Croatia
- Guyana
- Kazakhstan
- Jamaica
- Nepal
- New Zealand
- Peru
- Seychelles
- Uruguay

Resident elsewhere:

- Afghanistan (Cairo)
- Bahrain (Khartoum)
- Botswana (Lusaka)
- Cameroon (Pretoria)
- Equatorial Guinea (Kampala)
- Iceland (Geneva)
- Laos (New Delhi)
- Maldives (New Delhi)
- Malta (Valletta)
- Mongolia (Cairo)
- Portugal (Maputo)
- Singapore (Singapore)
- Turkmenistan (Riyadh)
- Uzbekistan (Riyadh)

== Future missions ==
- Bahamas (High Commission–under discussion)
- Hungary (Embassy)
- Iraq (Embassy)
- Serbia (Embassy)
- Venezuela (Embassy)

== Closed missions ==
Host city	Sending country	Mission	Year closed	Ref.
Dar es Salaam	Argentina	Embassy	1991	
Dar es Salaam	Australia	High Commission	1987	
Dar es Salaam	East Germany	Embassy	1990	
Dar es Salaam	Mexico	Embassy	1980	
Dar es Salaam	Romania	Embassy	1999	
Zanzibar City	Egypt	Consulate-General	Unknown	
Zanzibar City	United Kingdom	Consulate	1965	
Zanzibar City	East Germany	Consulate-General	1971	

== See also ==
- Foreign relations of Tanzania
- List of diplomatic missions of Tanzania
