= Dodoma Airport =

Airport in Dodoma Region, Tanzania

Dodoma Airport Uwanja wa Ndege wa Dodoma (Swahili)
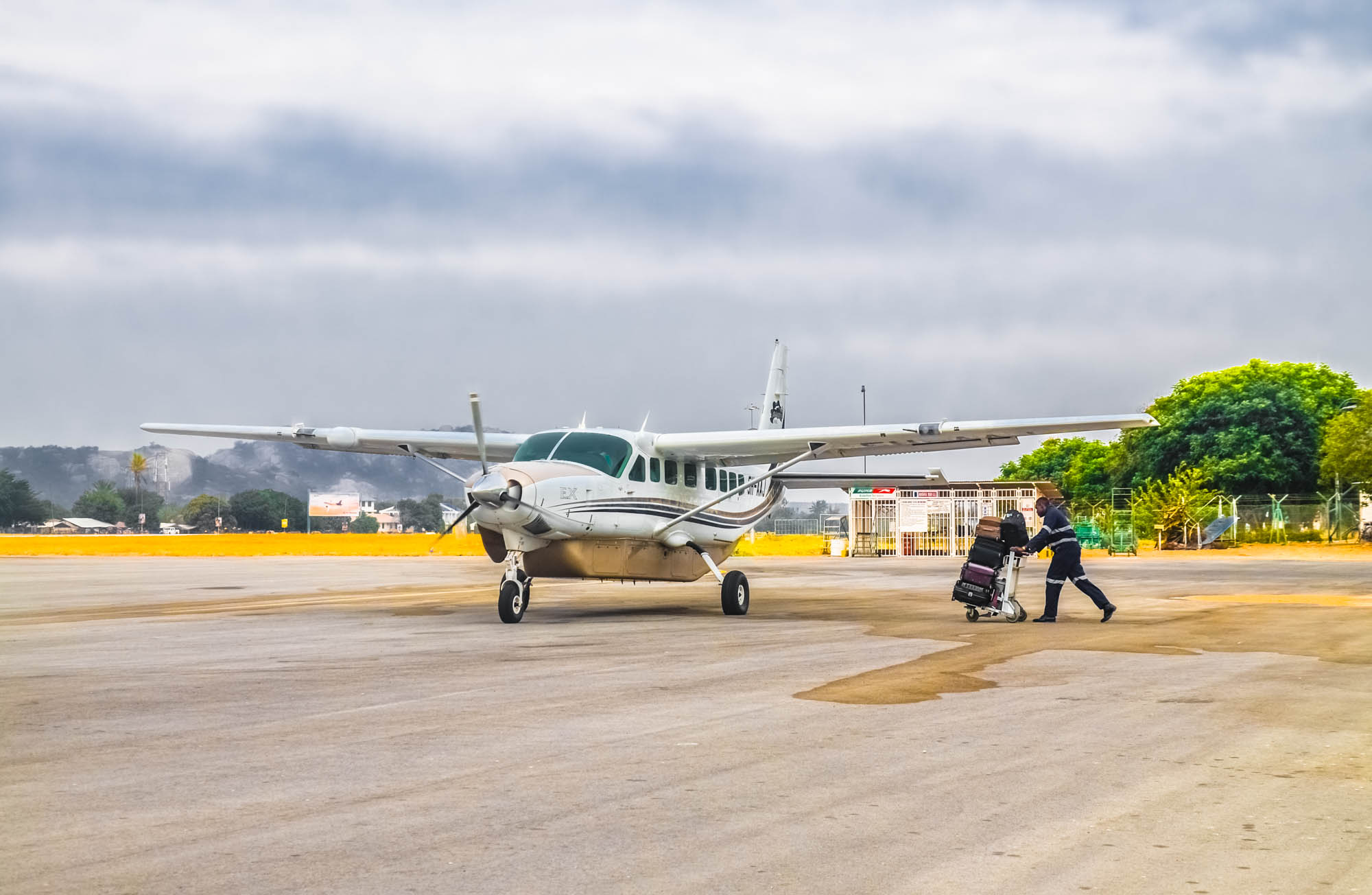
- IATA: DOD; ICAO: HTDO; WMO: 63862

Summary
- Airport type: Public
- Owner: Government of Tanzania
- Operator: Tanzania Airports Authority
- Location: B129, Dodoma, Dodoma Region, Tanzania
- Elevation AMSL: 1,109 m (3,638 ft)
- Coordinates: 06°10′13″S 35°44′58″E
- Website: www.taa.go.tz

Map
- Location of Dodoma Airport DOD (Africa) DOD (Earth)

Runways
Direction	Length		Surface
Direction	m	ft	Surface
09/27	2,450	8,038	Asphalt

Statistics (2024)
- Passengers: 164,059
- Aircraft movements: 5,224
- Source: TAA

Dodoma Airport (IATA: DOD, ICAO: HTDO) is an airport serving the Tanzanian capital of Dodoma located in the Dodoma Region. It has a runway that's 2,450 metres (8,038 feet) long, at an elevation of 1,109 metres (3,638 feet).

== Airlines and destinations ==
Airlines	Destinations
Air Tanzania	Dar es Salaam
Precision Air	Dar es Salaam, Iringa

== See also ==
- Msalato International Airport
