= Msalato International Airport =

Proposed airport in Dodoma Region, Tanzania

- An artist's impression of the terminal building.
- IATA: n/a; ICAO: n/a

Summary
- Airport type: Public
- Owner: Government of Tanzania
- Operator: Tanzania Airports Authority
- Serves: Dodoma
- Location: Msalato, Tanzania
- Focus city for: Dodoma
- Coordinates: 06°03′30″S 35°46′41″E
- Website: www.msalatoairport.com

Map
- Proposed location of airport in Tanzania Msalato (Africa) Msalato (Earth)

Runways
Direction	Length		Surface
Direction	m	ft	Surface
TBD	-	-	Asphalt

Msalato International Airport (Swahili: Uwanja wa Ndege wa Kimataifa wa Msalato) (IATA: n/a, ICAO: n/a) is an under construction international airport project intended to serve the Tanzanian capital city of Dodoma located in Dodoma Region.

== Location ==
The planned airport would be located in Msalato Ward, approximately 14 kilometres (9 mi), by road, north of the central business district of the city of Dodoma. The airport would occupy 45 square kilometres (17 sq mi) of real estate.

== Overview ==
Dodoma Airport, which serves the capital is located within the municipality and cannot accommodate larger aircraft. Due to the location of Dodoma Airport, it cannot be expanded easily. The government of Tanzania plans to construct an intentional airport in Msalato, to handle large passenger and cargo aircraft to carry politicians, diplomats, tourists and businesspeople together with their luggage.

== Construction ==
After considering available alternatives, the Tanzanian government has decided to build a new greenfield international airport to serve the capital city of Dodoma, using money borrowed from the African Development Bank (AfDB).

The infrastructure involved includes a three storied terminal building for departing and arriving passengers, with capability of 1,500,000 arrivals annually. One main runway measuring 3,600 metres (11,811 ft) long, and 60 metres (197 ft) wide, with two taxiways, 2 parking aprons which can accommodate multiple A330 aircraft simultaneously. Also, arrival and departure gates, fencing, airport roads and car parking yards. Other operations infrastructure includes a control tower, radar equipment, a fire station and associated fire-fighting equipment, an aircraft fueling station, a water supply and distribution system, a dedicated electricity supply system with back-up (an alternative when the primary goes out) and a meteorology station.

== Funding ==
The table below outlines the sources of financing for Msalato International Airport. * Note: All amounts in millions in United States Dollars.

Sources of Funding for Msalato International Airport
Rank	Source	Foreign Currency	Local Currency	USD Millions	Percentage	Notes
1	African Development Bank	146.03	52.60	198.63	60.29	
2	African Development Fund	16.63	6.37	23.00	6.98	
3	Africa Growing Together Fund (AGTF)	39.12	10.88	50.00	15.18	
4	Government of Tanzania	36.28	21.56	57.84	17.55	
	Total	238.06	91.41	329.47	100.00	

== See also ==
- Dodoma Airport
