= Mtumba =

Ward in Dodoma, Tanzania

Mtumba Kata ya Mtumba
- Ward
- Location within Tanzania
- Coordinates: 6.1458177°S 35.94231979°E
- Country: Tanzania
- Region: Dodoma Region
- District: Dodoma Urban
- Ward: Mtumba

Government
  - MP: Antony Mavunde
  - Mayor: Professor Davis G. Mwamfupe
  - Councilor: Edward Maboje Nyagalu

Population (2016)
  - Total: 7,277
- Time zone: UTC+3 (EAT)

Mtumba is an administrative ward in the Dodoma Urban district of the Dodoma Region of Tanzania. The ward is along the main road to Dar es salaam. Residence in this ward depended traditionally much on agricultural activities and animal keeping. Since 2016 the new Government City housing the headquarters of ministries and government institutions has become functional in Mtumba.

In 2016 the Tanzania National Bureau of Statistics report there were 7,277 people in the ward, from 17,268 in 2012.
