= Dodoma =

Capital of Tanzania

Dodoma Jiji la Dodoma (Swahili)
- Capital city of Tanzania
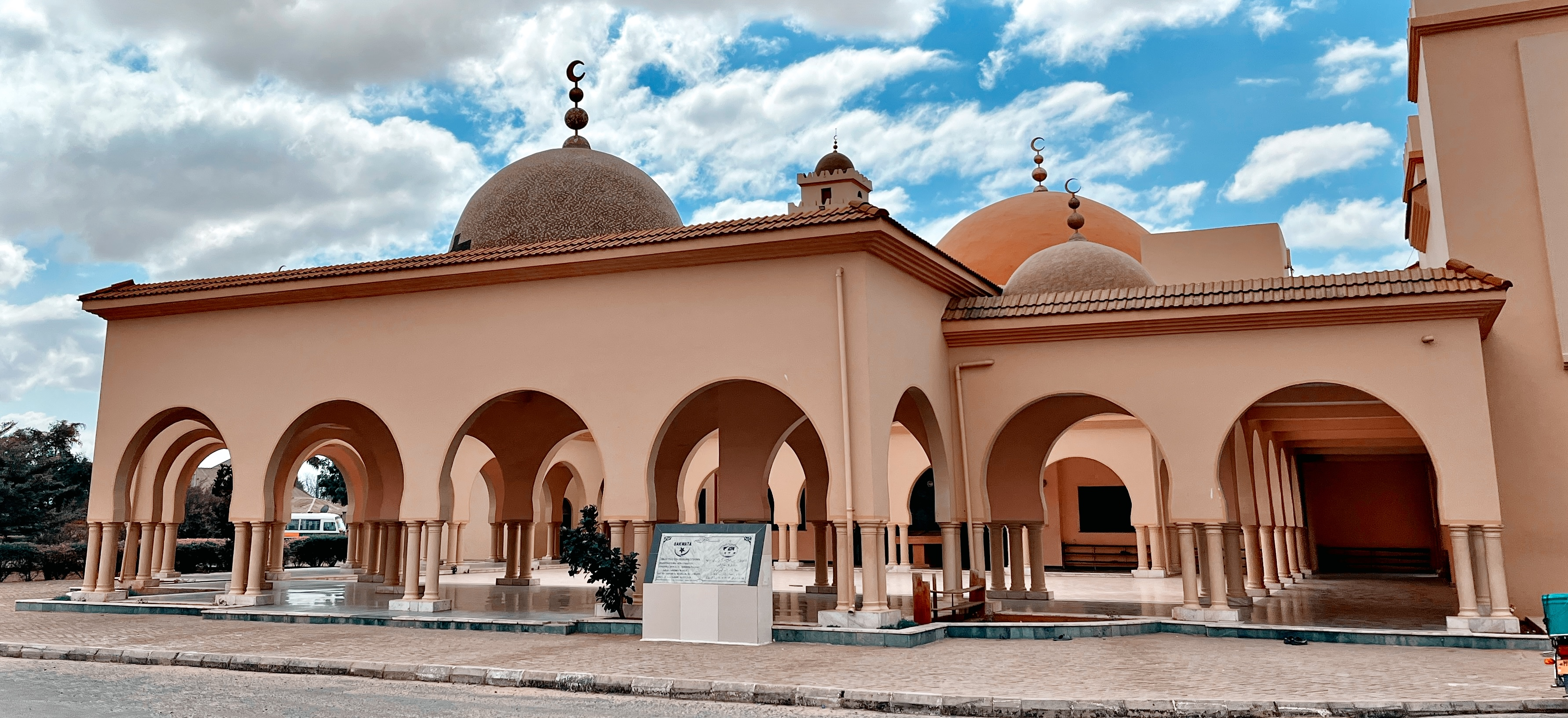
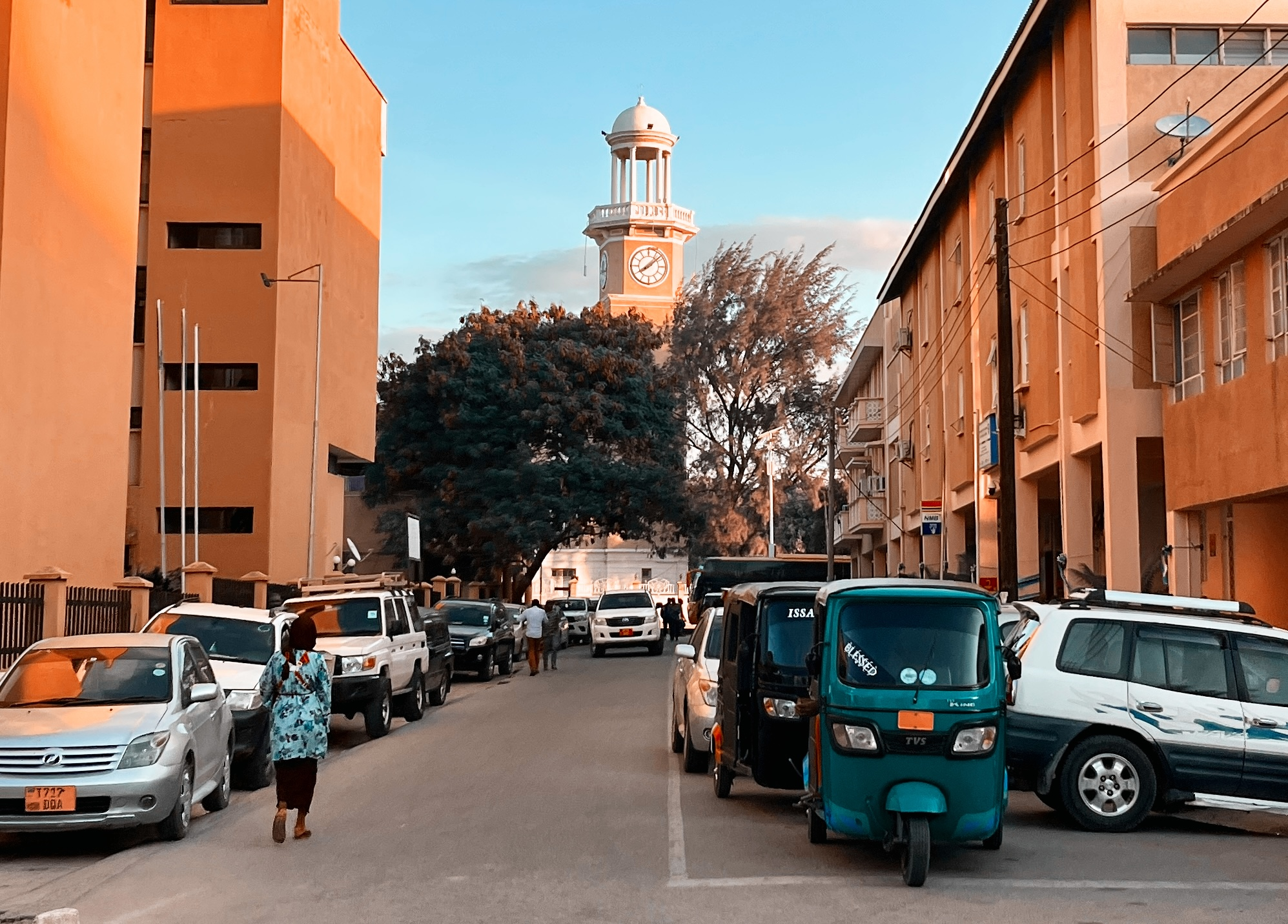
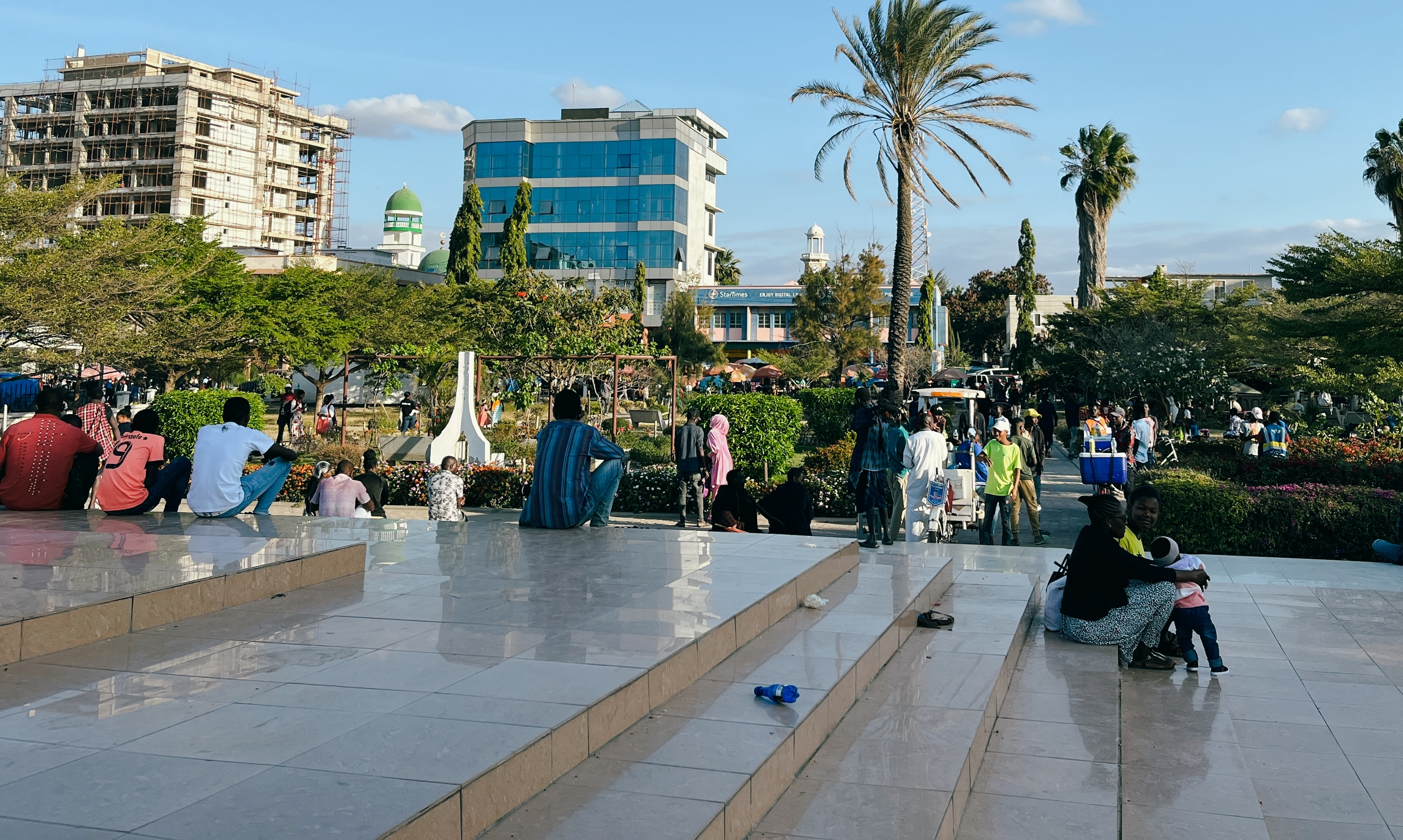
- Gaddafi mosque Street in Tambukareli ward Nyerere square
- Nickname: The Capital City
- Location of Dodoma Location within Africa
- Coordinates: 6°10′23″S 35°44′31″E
- Country: Tanzania
- Region: Dodoma

Government
  - Mayor: Davis G. Mwamfupe

Area
  - Land: 2,576 km^{2} (995 sq mi)
- Elevation: 1,120 m (3,670 ft)

Population (2022 census)
  - Total: 765,179
- Time zone: UTC+03:00 (EAT)
- Area code: 026
- Website: City website

Dodoma (lit. 'It has sunk' in Gogo), officially Dodoma City (Jiji Kuu la Dodoma, in Swahili), is the capital city of Tanzania. With a population of 765,179 as of 2022 which is projected to reach 1,000,000 by the end of 2026 (given the current pace of relocation of government organizations and NGOs), it is also the administrative capital of both Dodoma Municipal Council and the entire Dodoma Region. In July 2024, Dodoma officially surpassed Arusha to become Tanzania's third-largest city by both infrastructure and population measures. In 1974, the Tanzanian government announced that the national capital would move from Dar es Salaam to Dodoma for social and economic reasons and to centralise the capital within the country. It became the official capital in 1996.

In 2023, the national government under President Samia Suluhu unveiled the new State House in Dodoma, marking the relocation of government duties to the city. Nevertheless, Dar es Salaam has remained Tanzania's commercial and maritime capital while also retaining the state house, Ikulu, and a number of government functions.

== Geography ==
Located in the centre of the country, Dodoma is 453 kilometres (281 mi) west of Dar es Salaam and 441 kilometres (274 mi) south of Arusha, the headquarters of the East African Community. It is 259 kilometres (161 miles) north of Iringa through Mtera and 260 kilometres (160 miles) west of Morogoro. It has an area of 2,669 square kilometres (1,031 sq mi), of which 625 square kilometres (241 sq mi) is urbanized.

== History ==
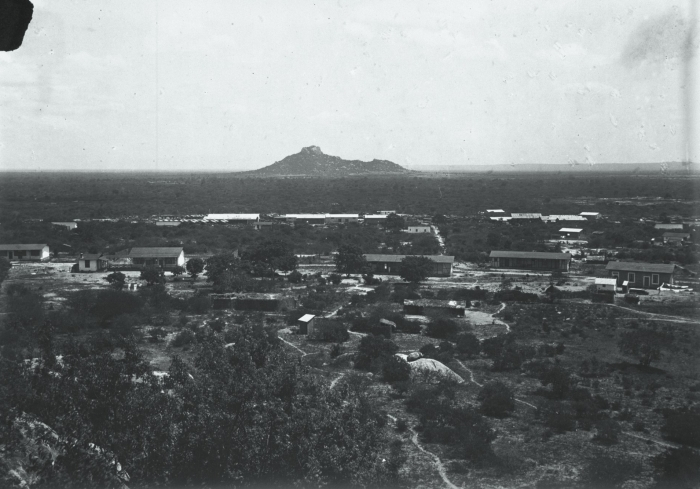
Dodoma in 1912

=== 20th century ===
Originally a small market town known as Idodomya, modern Dodoma was founded in 1907 by German colonists during construction of the Tanzanian central railway. The layout followed the typical colonial planning of the time, with a European quarter segregated from a native village.

In 1967, following independence, the government invited Canadian firm Project Planning Associates Ltd to draw up a master plan to help control and organise Dar es Salaam, which was undergoing rapid urbanisation and population growth. The plan was cancelled in 1972, in part due to its failure to adequately address the city's historical and social problems.

In 1974, after a nationwide referendum, the Tanzanian government announced that the capital would move from Dar es Salaam to a more central location to create significant social and economic improvements for the central region and to centralise the capital within the country. The cost was estimated at £186 million and expected to take 10 years. The site, the Dodoma region, had been considered a potential new capital as early as 1915 by the colonial power Germany; in 1932 by the British as a League of Nations mandate; and in the post-independence National Assembly in 1961 and 1966.

With an already established town at a major crossroads, the Dodoma region, in the nation's geographic centre, had an agreeable climate and room for development, Its rural environment was seen as the ujamaa heartland and therefore appropriate for a ujamaa capital that could see and learn from neighbouring villages and maintain a close relationship to the land.

A new capital was seen as a more economically viable alternative than attempting to reorganise and restructure Dar es Salaam and was idealised as a way of diverting development away from continued concentration in a single coastal city that was seen as anathema to socialist unity and development. Objectives for the new capital included that it become a symbol of Tanzania's social and cultural values and aspirations; that it be supplemented by industrial-commercial development; and that the mistakes and features of colonial planning and modern big cities, such as excessive population densities, pollution and traffic congestion, be avoided.

The Capital Development Authority (CDA) invited three international firms to submit proposals for the best location and preparation of a master plan: Project Planning Associates Ltd., of Canada; Doxiadis Associates International, of Greece (who had worked on Pakistan's new capital of Islamabad); and Engineering Consulting Firms Association, of Japan. A fourth firm from Germany submitted a proposal without invitation.

The winner, decided by the CDA together with independent American consultants, was Project Planning Associates, the same Canadian consultants whose plan for Dar es Salaam was seen as inadequate and not responsive enough to the local conditions and needs for Tanzania's largest city. Their plan envisaged a city of 400,000 persons by 2000 and 1.3 million by 2020.

The official capital since 1996, Dodoma was envisaged as the first non-monumental capital city as opposed to the monumentality and hierarchy of other planned capital cities such as Abuja, Yamoussoukro, Brasília and Washington, D.C. It rejected geometrical forms such as grid iron and radial plans as inappropriate as the urban form was intended to undulate and curve with the existing topography and not in conflict with it so as to retain its rural ujamaa feel. As befitted Tanzania's development at the time, the car was seen as secondary in importance to public transports such as buses which were then utilised by much of the population.

In 1974, Dodoma had a population of 40,000 and was chosen as the site of the new capital as opposed to nearby Hombolo or Ihumwa. The existing population size was not seen as an impediment while existing infrastructure would reduce construction costs.

The city, designed over 2,500 acres (1,000 hectares), was meant to be "the chief village in a nation of villages", built at a human scale meant to be experienced on foot. Its basic principles follow the garden city model of a town set amongst a garden with green belts separating segregated zones for residents and industry.

As part of the move of the government, a capitol complex was envisaged and designs by international teams offered competing visions and versions of the siting and layout of a capitol complex. These competing proposals, some paid for by foreign governments as a form of aid and others by the firms involved, were presented as early as 1978.

=== 21st century ===
In 2006, the Chinese government delivered a finished parliament building in Dodoma. It was not in its originally intended location in the master plan; that location was developed as a site for a university.

As much of the initial design never came to fruition over the past 40 years, government offices and embassies have resisted moving offices to Dodoma. As a result, many government offices remain in Dar es Salaam, which remains Tanzania's commercial and de facto capital.

Dodoma was envisaged as a nation-building project to cement a newly post-colonial independence identity and direction in Tanzania, and is similar to projects in Nigeria (Abuja), Côte d'Ivoire (Yamoussoukro), Botswana (Gaborone), Malawi (Lilongwe) and Mauritania (Nouakchott).

== Demographics ==
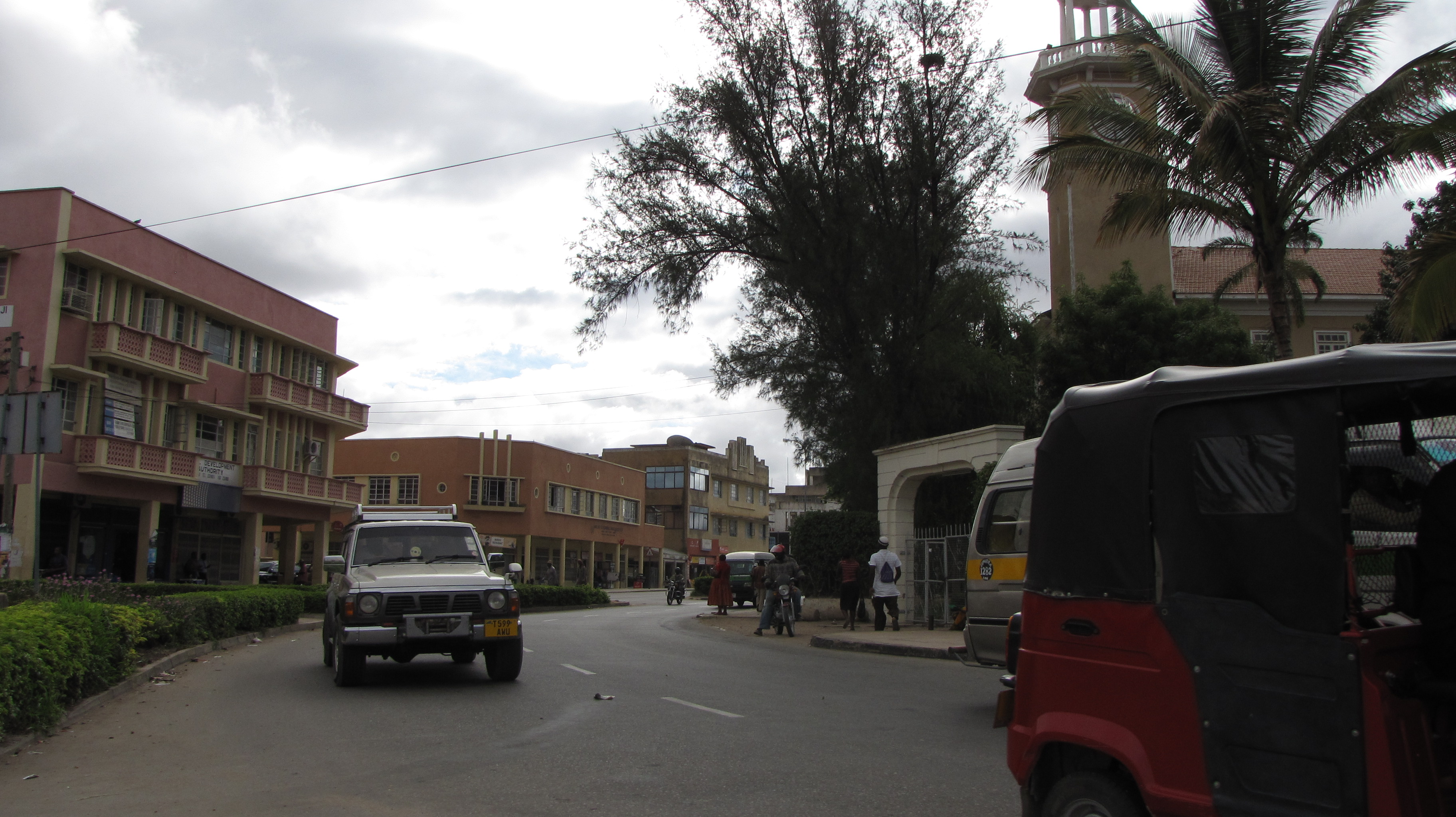
Central Dodoma in March 2015

Of Dodoma's population, 199,487 people (48.5%) are male and 211,469 (51.5%) are female. The average household size is 4.4 people. The Roman Catholic Church reports that 19.2% of the population are Roman Catholics. Dodoma is populated by different ethnic groups because it is a government administrative centre. The indigenous ethnic groups are the Gogo, Rangi, and Sandawe.

As of 2022, the population was recorded as 3,085,625 in Dodoma region of 41,311 km^{2}, while Dodoma city increased from 410,956 in 2012 to 765,179 in 2022, covering 2,607 km^{2}, or annual rate of 6.4% in ten years.

== Climate ==
Dodoma has a semi-arid climate with warm to hot temperatures year-round. Average highs are somewhat consistent throughout the year, but average lows dip to 13 °C (55.4 °F) in July. Dodoma averages 610 millimetres or 24 inches of annual rainfall, the vast majority of which occurs during its wet season between December and April. The rest of the year comprises the city's dry season.

Climate data for Dodoma (1991–2020)
Month	Jan	Feb	Mar	Apr	May	Jun	Jul	Aug	Sep	Oct	Nov	Dec	Year
Record high °C (°F)	35.3 (95.5)	36.0 (96.8)	33.5 (92.3)	32.7 (90.9)	32.9 (91.2)	31.7 (89.1)	31.1 (88.0)	34.1 (93.4)	33.8 (92.8)	36.1 (97.0)	36.0 (96.8)	36.4 (97.5)	36.4 (97.5)
Mean daily maximum °C (°F)	29.7 (85.5)	29.8 (85.6)	29.6 (85.3)	28.8 (83.8)	28.2 (82.8)	27.4 (81.3)	26.6 (79.9)	27.5 (81.5)	29.2 (84.6)	30.8 (87.4)	31.5 (88.7)	30.6 (87.1)	29.1 (84.4)
Daily mean °C (°F)	24.1 (75.4)	24.2 (75.6)	23.7 (74.7)	23.3 (73.9)	22.7 (72.9)	20.9 (69.6)	20.3 (68.5)	21.0 (69.8)	22.3 (72.1)	24.1 (75.4)	24.9 (76.8)	24.5 (76.1)	23.0 (73.4)
Mean daily minimum °C (°F)	19.3 (66.7)	19.2 (66.6)	19.0 (66.2)	18.4 (65.1)	17.1 (62.8)	15.1 (59.2)	14.2 (57.6)	14.9 (58.8)	15.9 (60.6)	17.5 (63.5)	18.8 (65.8)	19.3 (66.7)	17.4 (63.3)
Record low °C (°F)	15.7 (60.3)	15.4 (59.7)	13.5 (56.3)	14.5 (58.1)	10.3 (50.5)	8.9 (48.0)	7.6 (45.7)	9.3 (48.7)	11.1 (52.0)	13.0 (55.4)	14.4 (57.9)	14.4 (57.9)	7.6 (45.7)
Average precipitation mm (inches)	140.4 (5.53)	116.8 (4.60)	111.1 (4.37)	43.8 (1.72)	4.8 (0.19)	0.2 (0.01)	0.2 (0.01)	0.0 (0.0)	0.1 (0.00)	6.0 (0.24)	27.8 (1.09)	143.3 (5.64)	594.5 (23.41)
Average rainy days (≥ 1.0 mm)	9.9	8.4	7.7	4.1	0.8	0.1	0.1	0.0	0.1	0.4	2.1	7.9	41.6
Average relative humidity (%)	66	68	70	68	63	60	59	58	55	53	55	63	62
Source 1: NOAA
Source 2: Deutscher Wetterdienst (extremes and humidity), Tokyo Climate Center (mean temperatures 1991–2020)

== Education ==
=== Universities ===
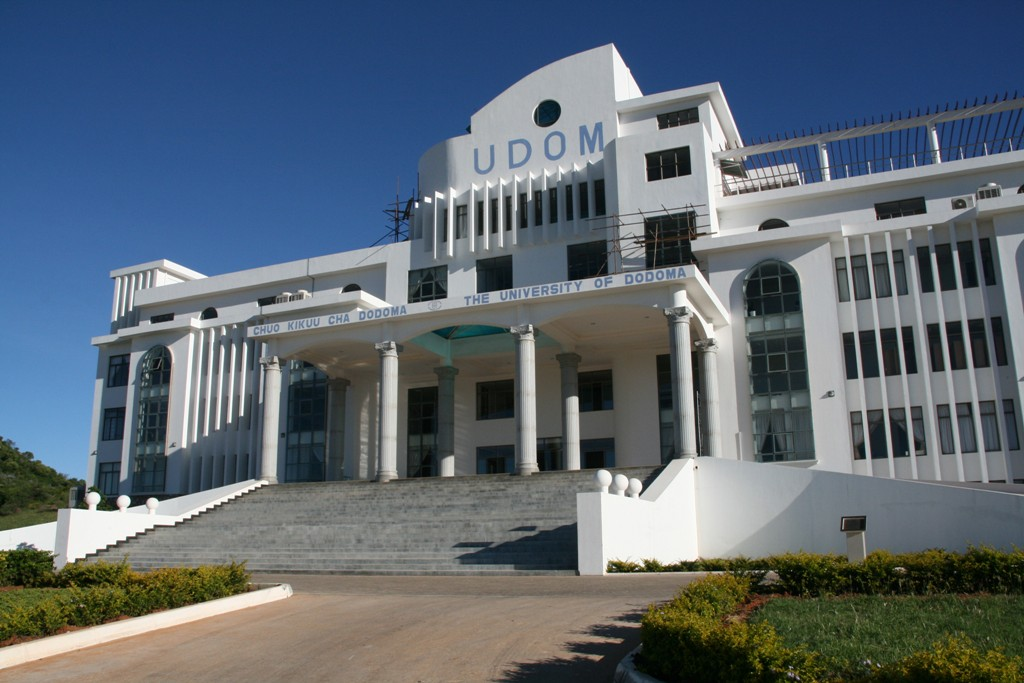
The University of Dodoma

Several universities are in Dodoma, including the Open University of Tanzania, which has campuses in several cities, St. John's University of Tanzania, owned by the Anglican Church of Tanzania, and the University of Dodoma, with about 35,000 students. Both universities opened in 2007. In addition there is the Mipango Institute and the CBE.

The Anglican Church runs the only international school in Dodoma, Canon Andrea Mwaka School ("CAMS"). Established in 1950, CAMS educates children from Nursery to Form 4. The education is based on the English National curriculum and the school gives students the opportunity to take IGCSE examinations. The school has about 280 students.

== Transport ==
=== Airport ===
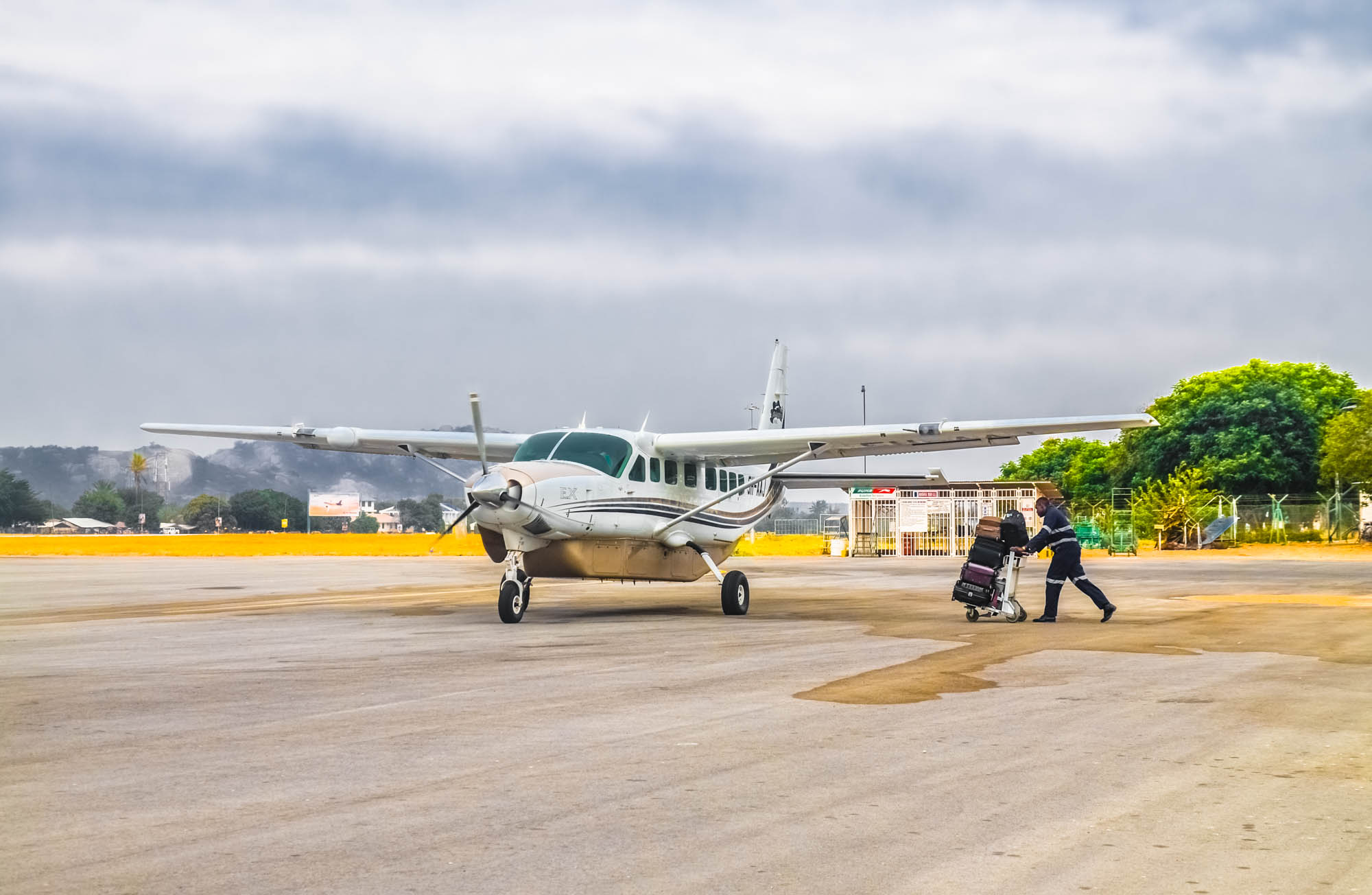
A stationary aircraft at Dodoma Airport

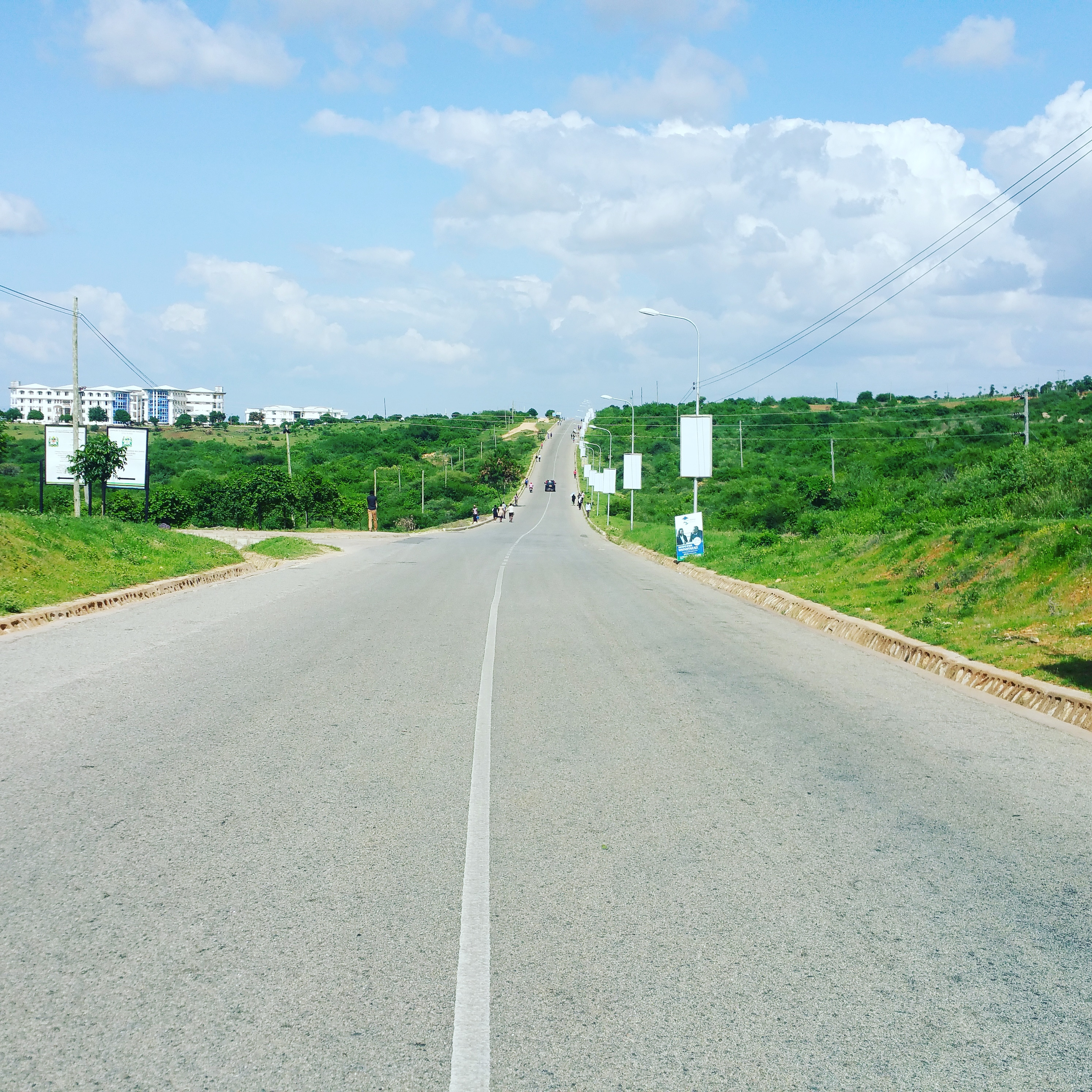
The road to the University of Dodoma

North of the city centre, Dodoma Airport is managed by the Tanzania Civil Aviation Authority. Flights are limited to small aircraft operated commercially by Precision Air, Air Tanzania, Auric Air, and Flightlink. In December 2019, plans were announced to construct the Msalato International Airport about 14 km north of Dodoma city centre, through a US$272 million financing package supported by the African Development Bank and other development partners. The airport will have greater runway length and weight-bearing capacity than Dodoma Airport, enabling it to handle larger passenger and cargo aircraft. As of 2026, construction remained underway, with infrastructure works reported at about 85% completion and building works over 70% complete.

=== Railway ===
The city is served by Dodoma Railway Station, near Kikuyu Avenue, through which runs the Central Railway Line, which connects Dodoma over a distance of 465 kilometres (289 mi) with Dar es Salaam. In 2019, Tanzania Railways commissioned a study of a Dodoma commuter rail network. Dodoma is served by both the historic metre-gauge Central Railway Line and the modern Standard Gauge Railway (SGR).

Dodoma is also connected to Dar es Salaam by Tanzania's electrified Standard Gauge Railway (SGR), operated by the Tanzania Railways Corporation (TRC). Commercial passenger services between Dar es Salaam and Dodoma began in 2024.

The SGR line through Dodoma forms part of Tanzania's wider standard gauge railway network intended to connect Dar es Salaam with Mwanza, Kigoma, and neighboring countries, including Rwanda and Burundi.

In 2019, Tanzania Railways commissioned a study into a Dodoma commuter rail network.

=== Public transport ===
A daladala station serves Dodoma on B129 south west of Dodoma.

=== Road link ===
The Cairo-Cape Town Highway passes through Dodoma. A major highway connects Dodoma with Dar es Salaam via the Morogoro in the east. To the west, there are roads to Mwanza and Kigoma going through Singida and Tabora. The Great North Road links the city with Babati and Arusha to the north, via Kondoa and Iringa, Njombe, Songea, Mbeya and Vwawa to the south via Mtera.

== Government ==
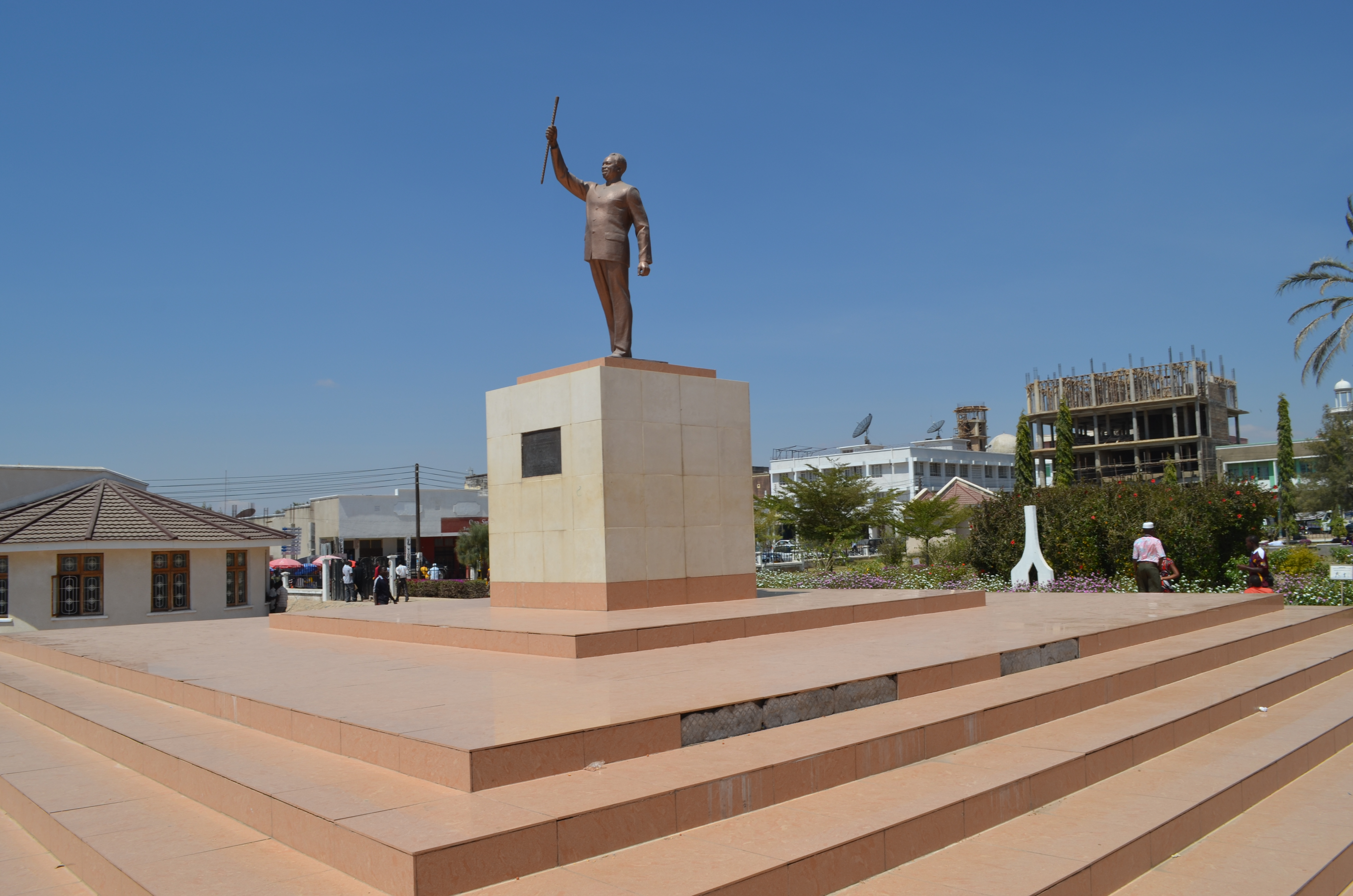
Nyerere Square

The Parliament of Tanzania is in Dodoma. The office of the President of Tanzania and the headquarters of ministers of the Government of Tanzania completed the move to the city's Mtumba area in 2019.

== Sports ==
The city is represented in the Tanzanian Premier League by football club Dodoma Jiji FC, which used to be called Polisi Dodoma. The club is run by the city council of Dodoma. Other older clubs include CDA, Waziri Mkuu, Kurugenzi, Mji Mpwapwa, and Dundee. There is also a rising interest in other sports, particularly basketball.

=== Stadium ===
The city hosts the Jamhuri Stadium on School Avenue. In addition, a new multi-purpose stadium is under construction in Dodoma as part of the government's sports infrastructure development programme.

== Places of worship ==
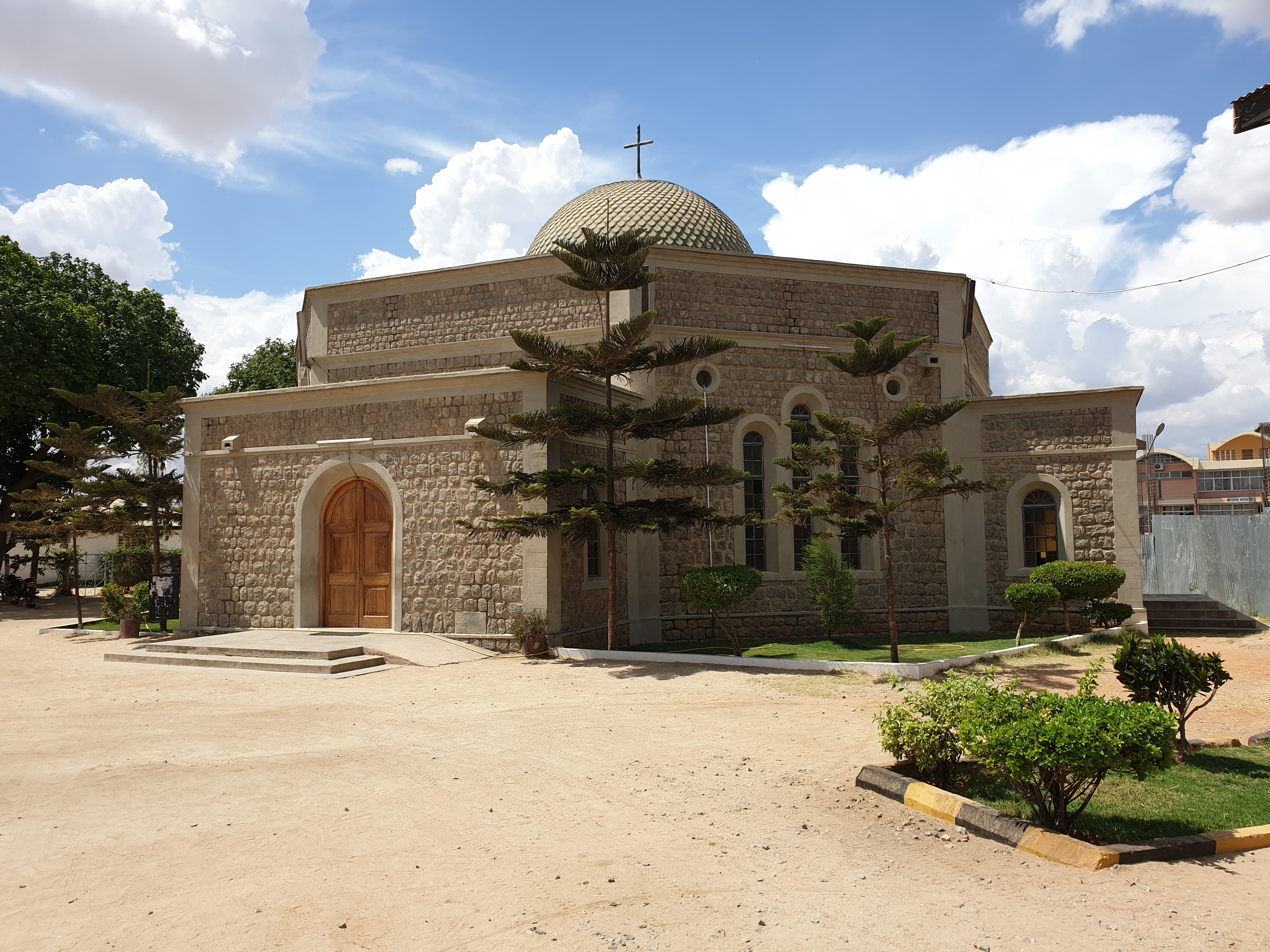
Anglican Cathedral of Holy Spirit

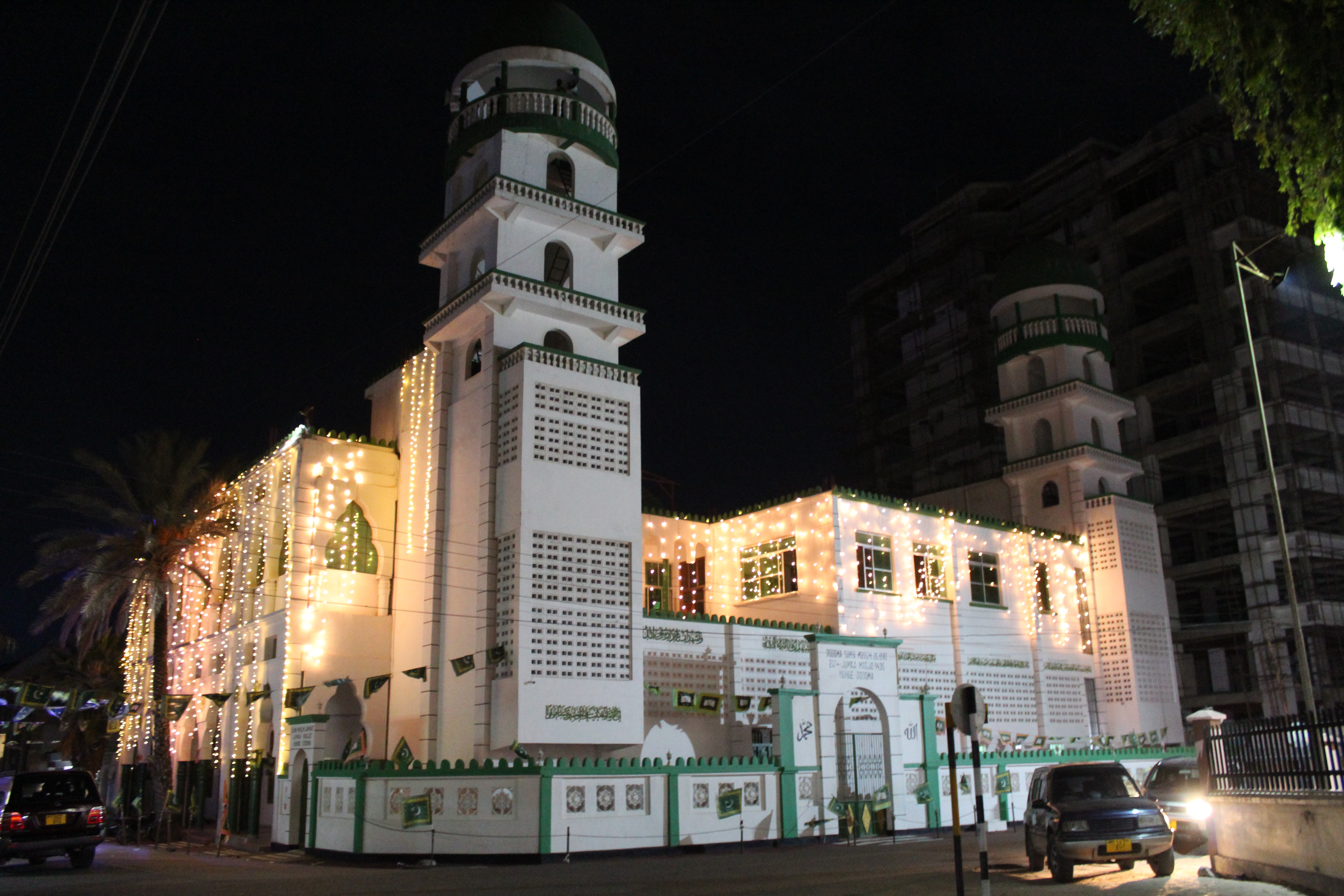
Dodoma Sunni Masjid (Nunge Mosque)

Dodoma is home to many places of worship for people of multiple faiths. From Christian churches such as the Roman Catholic Archdiocese of Dodoma (Catholic Church), Anglican Church of Tanzania (Anglican Communion), Evangelical Lutheran Church in Tanzania (Lutheran World Federation), Baptist Convention of Tanzania (Baptist World Alliance), and Assemblies of God to Muslim mosques including the Sunni Masjid (Nunge), Gaddafi Mosque and KSIJ Mosque. The city also hosts a Hindu Mandir, as well as a Sikh Gurudwara.

== Gallery ==
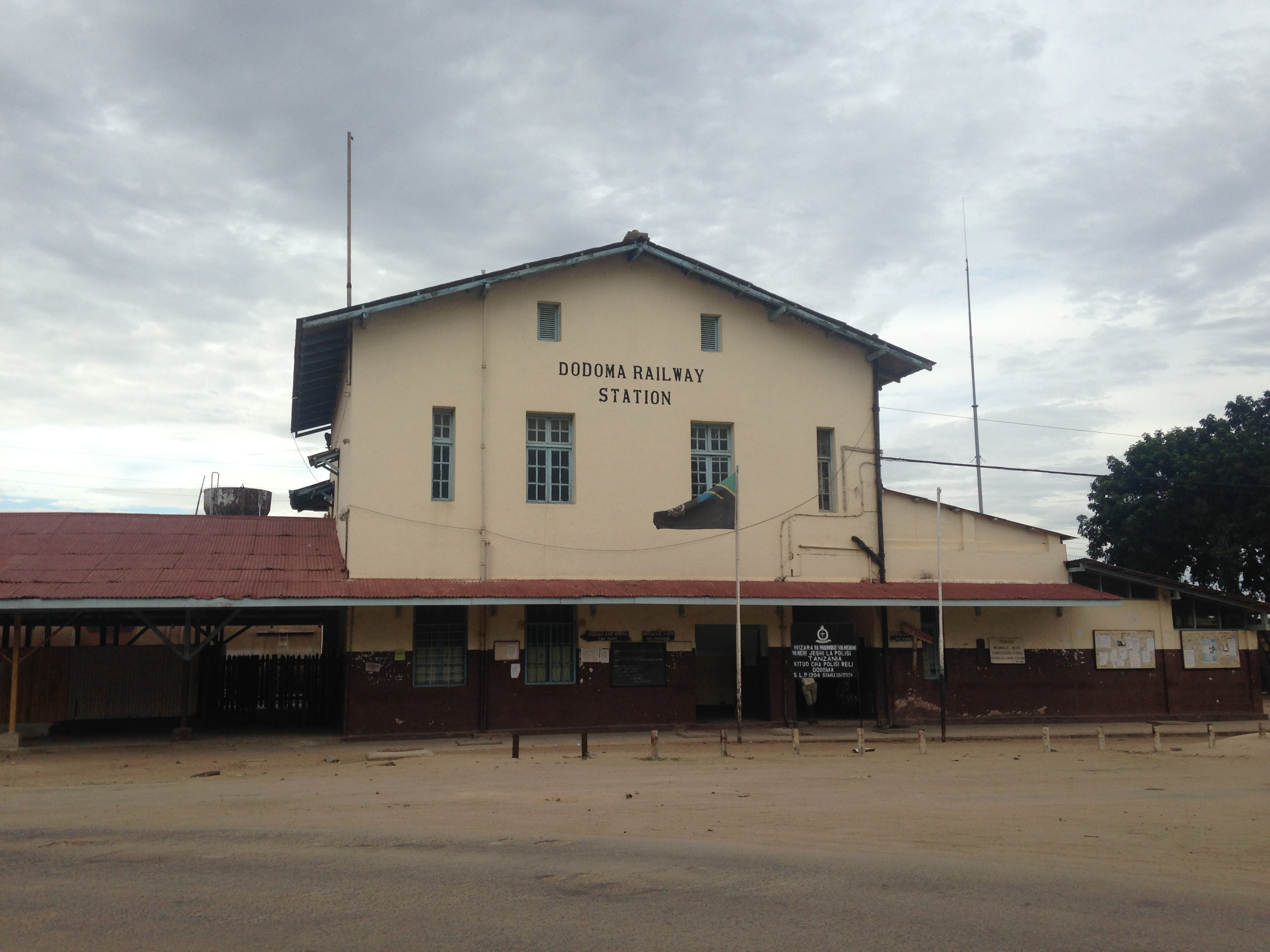
Dodoma Railway Station

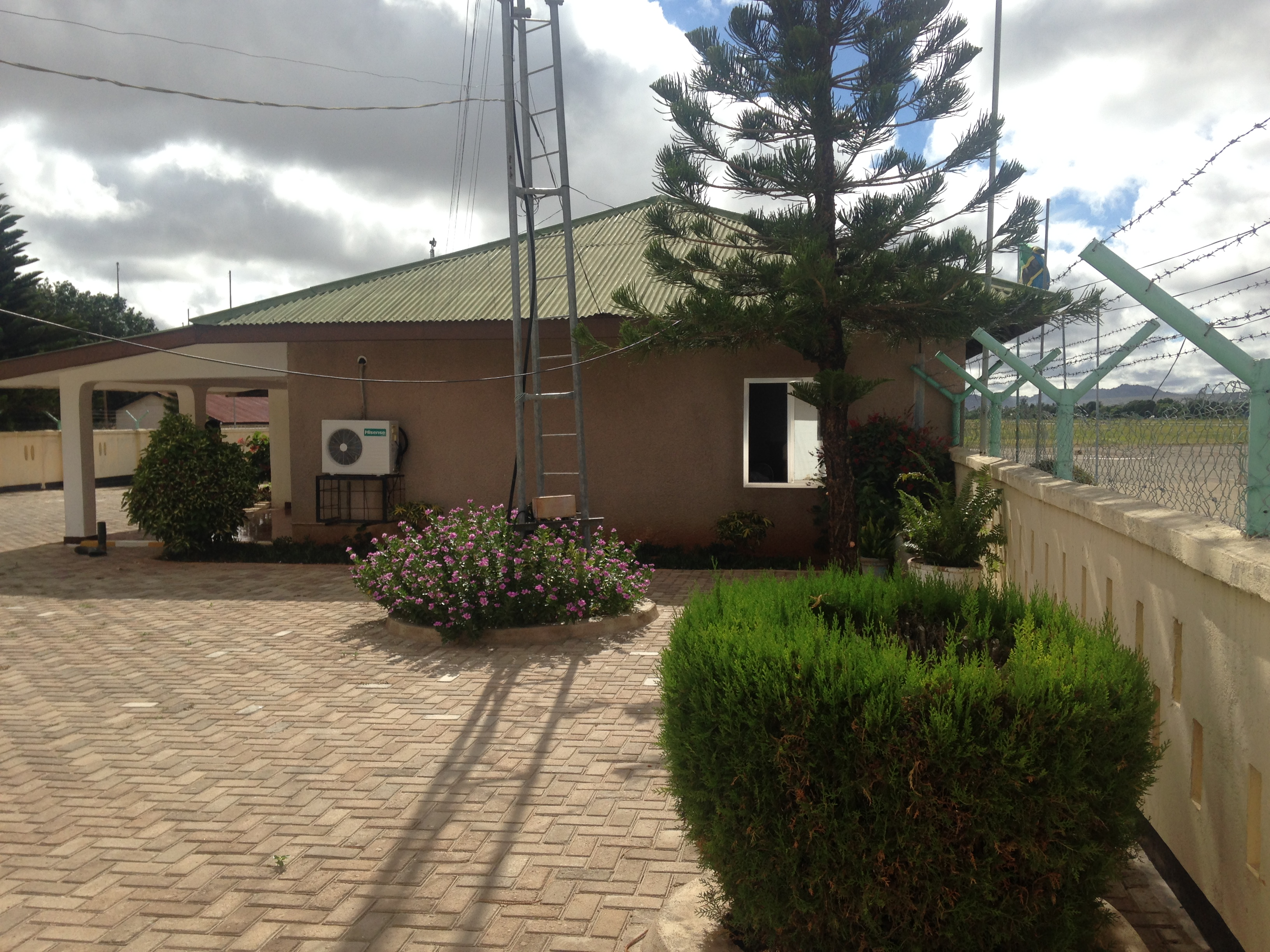
Dodoma Airport

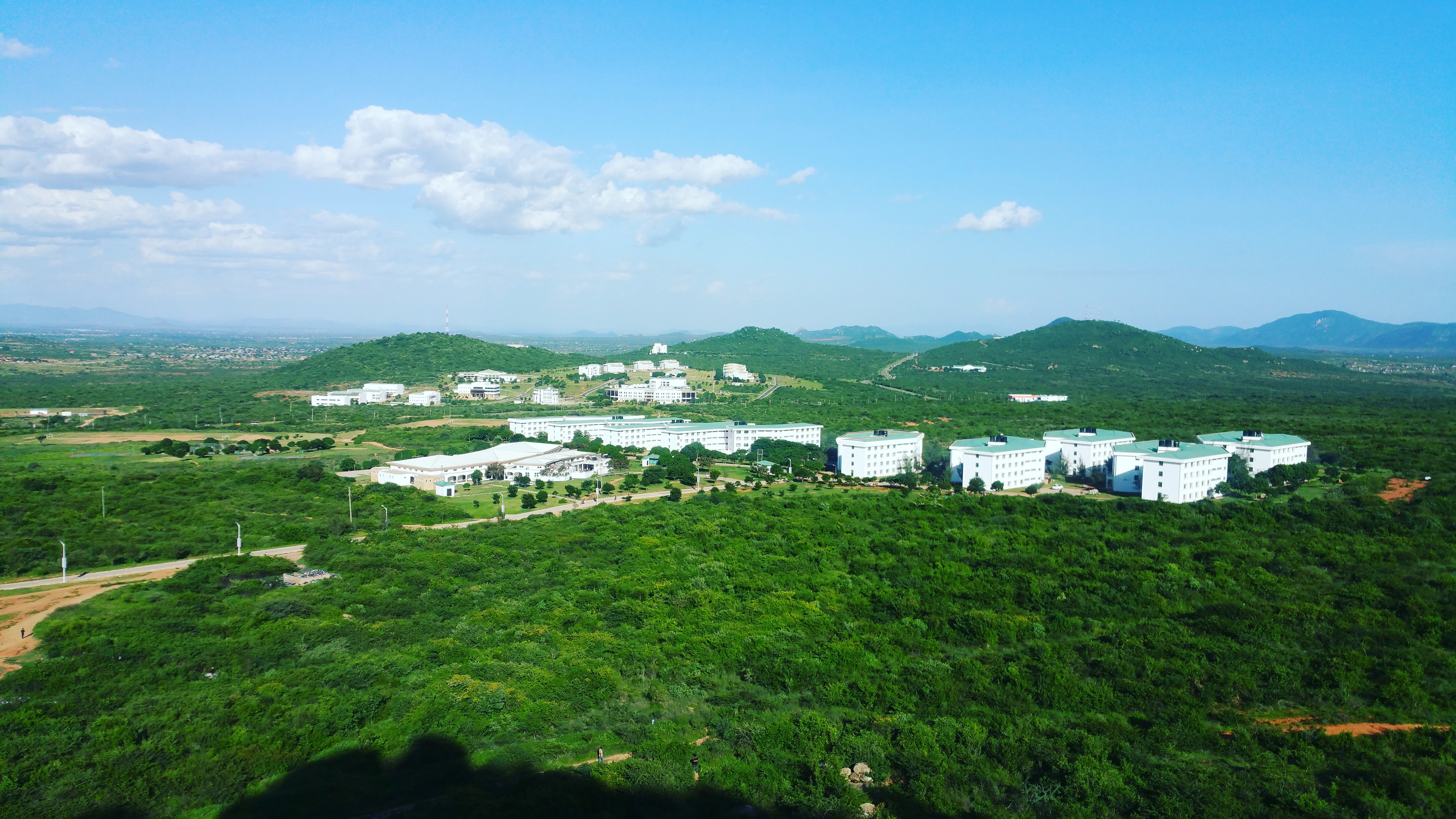
A hostel at the University of Dodoma

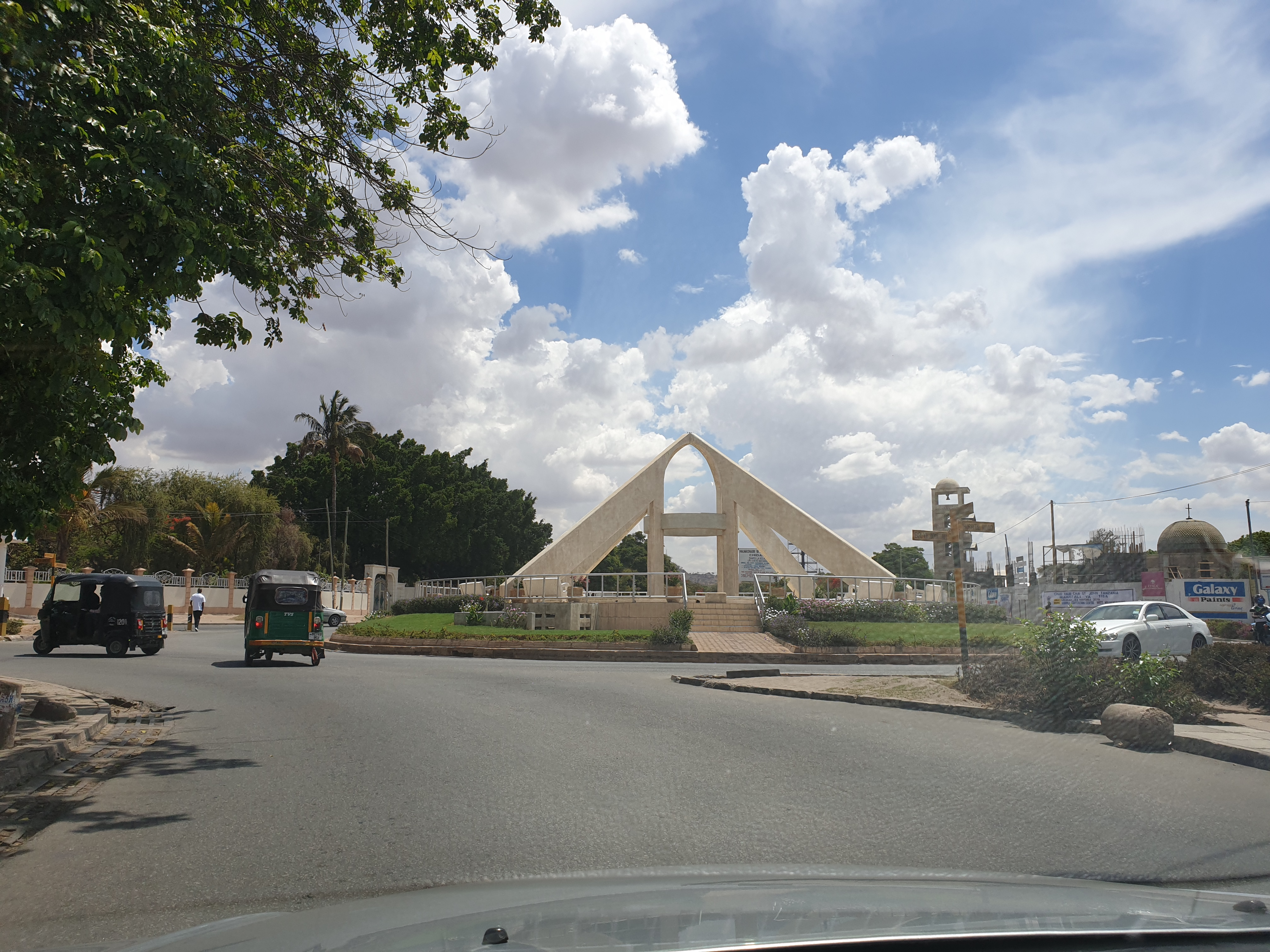
Roundabout in Dodoma

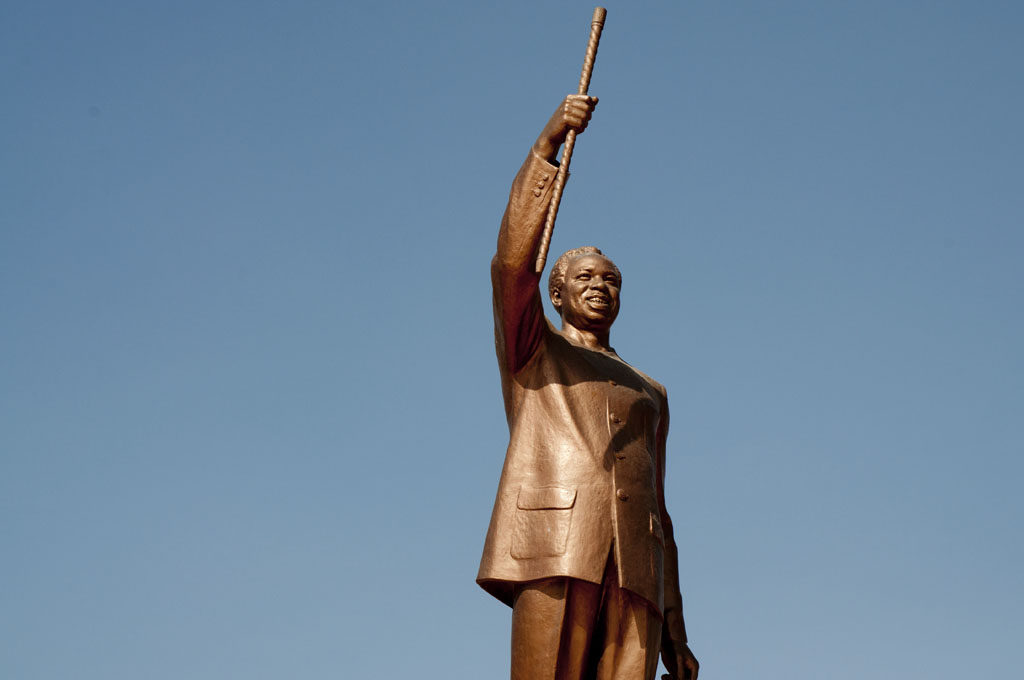
Nyerere's statue in Dodoma

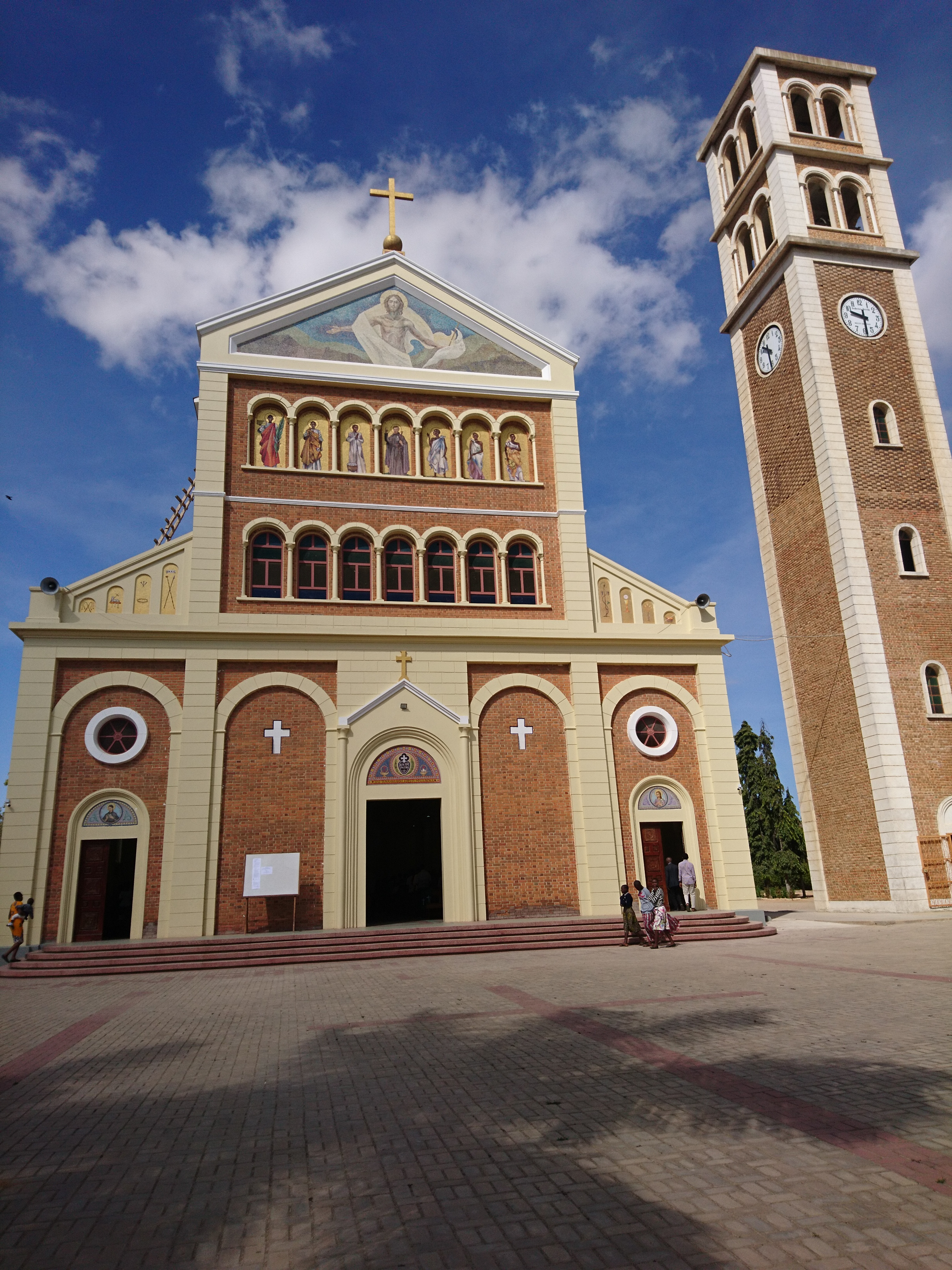
St Paul of the Cross Cathedral in Dodoma

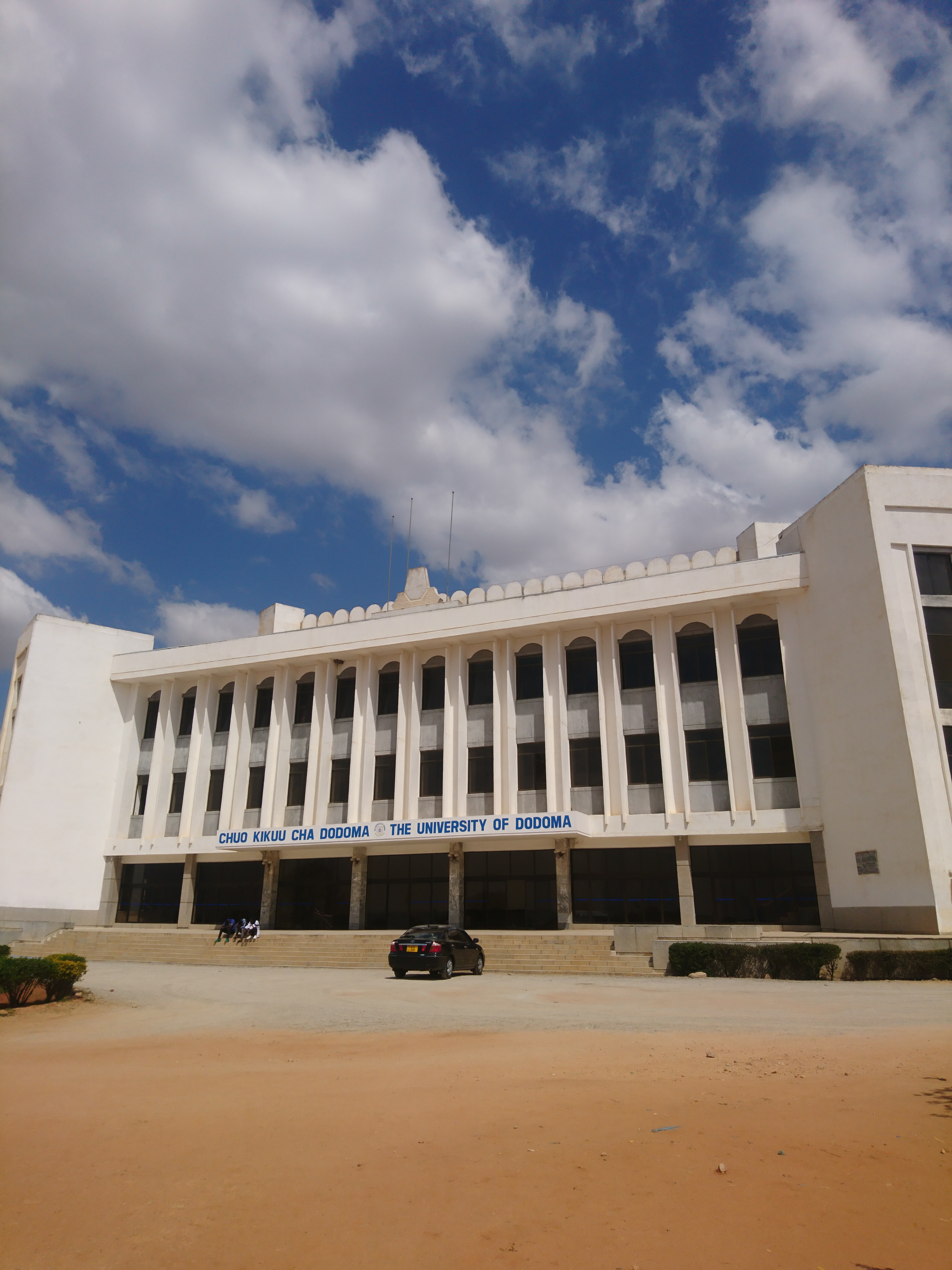
Chimwaga Complex Hall

== Twin towns – sister cities ==
Dodoma is twinned with the following places:

- Jaipur, India
- Bangui, Central African Republic
- Watsa, Democratic Republic of Congo
- Linz, Austria

== See also ==
- Tanzanian wine – produced near Dodoma
