= Ndamba people =

Ethnic group from Iringa and Morogoro Regions of Tanzania

The Ndamba are an ethnic and linguistic group based in south-central Tanzania whose population was 500,000 in 2022. They are found in everywhere in Tanzania especially south central, the Kilolo District of Iringa Region, northeast of Bena, southeast of Hehe, west of Pogolo and southwest of Mbunga.

== Language ==
The Chindamba language has a lexical similarity of 69% with Mbunga and 56% with Pogolo. Speakers also use Swahili. Although it has been reported that Ndamba and Mbunga are two different tribes, the reality is that they are one tribe and the difference between them is purely dialectic. All three are Rufiji–Ruvuma languages of the Bantu family.

In recent years some Ndambas have volunteered to write a dictionary on Chindamba. The first standard Ndamba dictionary was published in 2008 and 2010 by Agathon Kipandula, a language researcher who was an employee of the Bank of Tanzania. Some Ndambas have also written Historia na Maisha ya Wandamba that was published in 2022. Those writers include: Reverend Fidelis Mfalanyombo (OSA), Agathon Kipandula, John Eusebius Chilipweli, Asernius Hamis Ndege and Leoni Alois Mbala

Linguistic texts include the 2010 Rüdiger Köppe Verlag publication Edelsten, Peter; Lijongwa, Chiku (2010). A Grammatical Sketch of Chindamba - A Bantu Language (G52) of Tanzania. ISBN 978-3-89645-706-6.

== Origin ==
Oral tradition states that the Ndamba people were originally an offshoot of the Pogoro people. Their first chief was Mbuyi Undole I, who led a small group westward away from the Pogoro. It was Mbuyi Undole I who registered the Ndamba as a tribe with the German government in 1901. The Ndamba flourished and spread through the southern part of the Morogoro Region. The tribe is now found in Mlimba, Masagati, Chisano, Chita, Merera, Malinyi, Igawa, Biro, Ngombo, Mchombe, Mngeta, Lwipa, Mbingu, Mofu, and other parts of Kilombero District and Ulanga District areas.

== Customs and beliefs ==
The tribe, also known as Wandamba, is well known for eating rice and fish only.

Most of them belong to the Roman Catholic Church.
