= Vidunda people =

Ethnic group from Morogoro and Dodoma Region of Tanzania

Vidunda
Wavidunda

Total population
- 12,771 (1957)

Regions with significant populations
- Tanzania Morogoro Region (Kilosa District)

Languages
- Chividunda & Swahili

Religion
- Majority Islam, Minority Christianity and African Traditional Religion

Related ethnic groups
- Zaramo, Kami, Nguu, Kaguru & other Bantu peoples

- Person: Mvidunda
- People: Wavidunda
- Language: Kividunda

The Vidunda or Ndunda are a Bantu, matrilineal ethnic group from northern Morogoro Region of Tanzania specifically indigenous to the Kilosa District. The Vidunda live in south of Mikumi and north of the Great Ruaha River, including in the Uvidunda Mountains. The Vidunda population was estimated to number 90,000. The Vidunda practice Christianity and Islam and speak the Vidunda language.

== History and Matriarchy ==
The Vidunda believe they are closely related to the Hehe and Sagara and claim to be from the Hehe. They had previously successfully repulsed southern attacks by both Hehe and Mbunga. They were severely retaliated against by the Germans for their involvement in the Maji-maji Rebellion in 1905.

There are many minor exogamous matri-clans (kungugo or lukolo) among the Vidunda. Numerous of these share names with clans in other matrilineal peoples in northeastern Tanzania. Additionally, the Vidunda have identified patrilineal groupings whose sole apparent purpose is to control food bans. Membership in these two categories frequently determines a person's name. Membership in one's own matrilineage (kungugo or lukolo) and relationship to one's father's matrilineage dictate the majority of social and economic obligations.

While many Vidunda by the 1950s lived in single homesteads, some still live in small hamlets (kaya) of two or three to more than a dozen dwellings. According to some reports, members of the same matrilineage used to frequently live together under the supervision of a single elder member. Although Schaegelen's findings are contradictory, it appears likely that younger and poorer men settled with their wives' relatives, even though the ideal pattern for successful men was for a man to form a settlement of his offspring and their spouses. These days, most people live locally, and there are reportedly fewer and fewer major hamlets.⁣

In pre-colonial times, the Vidunda, Zigula, and Shambala were among the few peoples in eastern Tanzania to have some sort of paramount leader. This chief, known as Mtwa or Mndewa, led warriors in the fight against raiders and was rewarded every year with food, free labour for building houses and cultivating land, and the ivory of all elephants killed within the chiefdom. In addition, he oversaw the area's fertility, cleansing, and rainmaking ceremonies. Men from the Vidunda tribe wore skins that hung over one shoulder and grass kilts.

In pre-colonial times, the Vidunda, Zigula, and Shambala were among the few peoples in eastern Tanzania to have some sort of larger kingdom. This King, known as Mtwa or Mndewa, led warriors in the fight against raiders and was rewarded every year with food, free labour for building houses and cultivating land, and the ivory of all elephants killed within the kingdom. In addition, he oversaw the area's fertility, cleansing, and rainmaking ceremonies.

In the Temekwila matri-clan, the kingship is supposed to descend; nevertheless, this law seems to have been regularly disregarded in favour of a chief's son. Elders known as wasanyila or wasangira, who were selected from different clans, used to support the king. Some claim that the king nominated them, while others assert that their own people chose them. The Kinship was abolished in 1962 by Nyerere's government.

== Religion ==
Chorosa or Mwenagawa are the supreme deities that the Vidunda believe in. Their primary focus is on appeasing ancestral ghosts, or wazimu, that haunt wrongdoers or their relatives, as well as those who fail to offer sacrifices to the ancestral ghosts. The majority of procedures to appease ghosts or cleanse the living of wrongs that have offended the dead are performed by joking companions, or watani. A few illnesses are also brought on by bad spirits, or tnirunga. Evil people turn into restless spirits that also cause trouble. However, witchcraft is the primary source of misfortune (kuloga, to bewitch). Dividers and ordeal testing were used to identify witches. Under the supreme chief's command, the guilty were either killed or sent over to slave traders.

The British installed a paramount chief in the 1940s, and his kinsmen oversaw the yearly rainmaking and purification rituals (ibindo), which took place around February. It is reported that representatives of all significant Vidunda lineages were anticipated to attend these, which were held at Mount Yungi in central Uvidunda. The chief's matri-clan spirits seem to have been appeased. In the Luguru Mountains, the chief was also responsible for procuring rainmaking medications from rainmakers from the Lulugu. Many Vidunda are either Roman Catholics or Muslims today.⁣

== Birth ==
After giving birth, women were confined for eight days. Women were expected to confess in order to facilitate labour, and difficult deliveries were associated with adultery. Until the umbilical cord fell, the father was to keep the wife and kid out of labour. The father and his sister marked the birth with a ceremony known as kufune. While breech births and children with upper teeth first are considered risky, twins are welcomed. However, these children were not killed.

== Initiation ==
Although the majority of Vidunda claim to have always been circumcised, they did not perform the practice traditionally, which makes them similar to their neighbours to the north and south. Adolescent boys went to bush camps to learn tribal customs and sex lore even before circumcision was made. The initiator, known as mhunga, starts during the dry season. Although labiadectomy was once performed on girls, it is no longer done in every chiefdom. Previously, novices were kept indoors for weeks at a time. Gubi (wild pig) was the most significant female initiation ceremony.

== Marriage ==
A go-between (msenga) typically makes the initial proposal. A marriage partnership is started by two consecutive minor payments (kibani). After this, bridewealth payments are typically made in installments. Prior to the last installment of bridewealth, the girl was not taken to live with the new husband. After a divorce, all bridewealth should be repaid. All of these things are unclear in Schaegelen's data. He notices that there is a fictitious kidnapping during the marriage ceremony.

== Death ==
Joking partners (watani) wash the corpses, and they are buried with the women on their left and the men on their right, facing east-west. The mourning household might not be able to work on the day of death. For eight days, Kin shave their heads, don no nice clothes or jewellery, and engage in sexual activity. Bathing and a sacrifice at the grave commemorate the end of sorrow on the eighth day. They throw dead lepers into the bush. Joking partners oversee inheritance procedures and funeral rites.
