= Kilosa =

Kilosa Kilossa
- Town
- Location in Tanzania
- Coordinates: 06°49′48″S 036°59′15″E
- Country: Tanzania
- Region: Morogoro Region
- District: Kilosa District

Population (2022 census)
  - Total: 43,418
- Time zone: UTC+3 (EAT)
- UFI: -2565094
- Climate: Aw

Kilosa (Kilossa) is a town in the Morogoro Region of Tanzania, East Africa. It is the administrative seat for Kilosa District. As of 2022, the population of the town was 43,418.

== Transport ==
Kilosa is a station on Tanzania's east–west Central Line railway, and the junction where the Mikumi line branches to the south.

Kilosa SGR Station lies on the Morogoro-Makutopora section (also referred to as the Morogoro-Dodoma section, or Phase 2) of the new Tanzania Standard Gauge Railway, intended to fully replace the Central Line. The Morogoro-Makutopora section began service on July 25, 2024, and was officially inaugurated by Tanzanian President Samia Suluhu Hassan on August 1, 2024.

== History ==
=== Hehe Wars ===
Kilosa was founded in November 1891, by German Colonial Lieutenant Tom von Prince, originally built as a fort named Kilosa, intended to protect the trading town of Kondoa, which it lay just to the west of. Using Kilosa Station and nearby Kisaki Station - which he founded in May 1892 - Lt. Prince began conducting raids into territory controlled by legendary Wahehe Sultan Mkwawa on both sides of the Great Ruaha River. Mkwawa did not back down when faced with this German aggression, having also won a major victory in Lugalo in July 1891. Mkwawa and his forces destroyed a German detachment near Kilosa in October 1892.

=== World War I ===
The Battle of Kilosa was fought during the East African Campaign in World War I.

== Demographics ==
Kilosa is the traditional home to many tribes, including the Sagara, Zigua, Sukuma, Nyamwezi, Gogo, and Vidunda.

Kilosa is also home to notable populations of several other tribes, including the Chaga, Hehe, Sambaa, and Zaramo.
