= Ifakara =

- Town
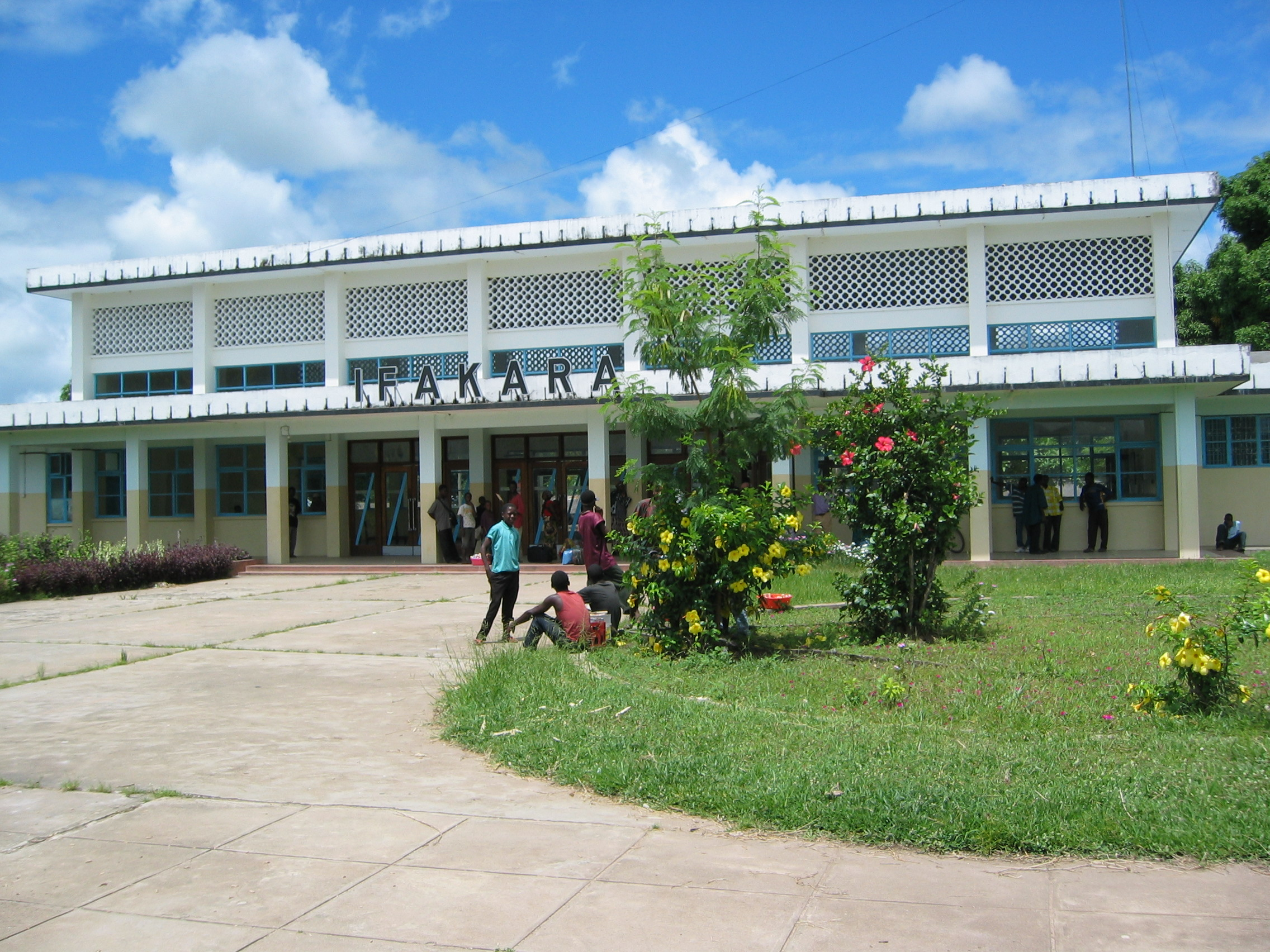
- The TAZARA train station in Ifakara.
- Nickname: Rice town
- Motto(s): Mji wa mchele, "Town of Rice"
- Ifakara Town District of Morogoro Region
- Coordinates: 08°06′S 36°41′E
- Country: Tanzania
- Region: Morogoro Region
- District: Kilombero District

Population (2022 census)
  - Total: 205,843
- Time zone: GMT + 3
- Area code: 023
- Climate: Aw
- Website: Regional website

Ifakara is a town in the Kilombero District, Morogoro Region, south central Tanzania. It is the headquarters of the Kilombero District administration and the main trading centre for Kilombero and Ulanga districts. The town is located near the Tanzania-Zambia Railway (TAZARA) line, at the edge of the Kilombero Valley, a vast swampland flooded by the mighty Kilombero River.

Ifakara is home to six major institutions of the Tanzanian health and water sectors:

- the Ifakara Health Institute, formerly Ifakara Health Research and Development Centre, recognized internationally for its research on malaria, other tropical diseases and health systems and services
- the St.Francis University College of Health and Allied Sciences(SFUCHAS), a constituent college of St. Augustine University of Tanzania, a higher learning institution established in 2010 offering Doctor of Medicine degree and other Allied health programs.
- the St. Francis Designated Referral Hospital
- Maji Safi Kwa Afya Bora Ifakara (MSABI) is an NGO implementing cost effective, community based water, sanitation, and hygiene projects in Tanzania.
- The Ifakara School of Nursing former Edgar Maranta Nursing school.

== Etymology ==
Etymologically, the name Ifakara is composed of two Ndamba words: ufa and kara which mean “land is destructed” or “land is totally dead”. It was named during the invasions by Lipangalala’s group in 1860s when the Ndamba were in great fear and were driven out of the Kilombero River (Larson 1976). While on the way back home they were informing their fellows they met on the way to the valley that things had fallen apart because of the invasions. Later, during the colonial period Europeans couldn’t pronounce it correctly hence “Ifakara” instead of “ufakara”.

== Sports ==
Ifakara is the home of talented and many sports. The sports game which is very famous in Ifakara is football where there are famous football teams which participate in different leagues and tournament in and out of Ifakara. Famous football clubs are Shupavu FC, Mlabani rangers, Techfort academy, kilombero soccernet, the wailers, kibaoni boys and other.

== History ==
Historically, Ifakara has passed through different administrative districts. While from 1899 to 1917 it was part of Mahenge militarbezirk, between 1917 and 1936 it was under Mahenge District (Larson 1976). From 1936 to independence (1961), Ifakara became part of Ulanga District. Today (2008), Ifakara is part of Kilombero District, Morogoro Region. It is both the division and district headquarters. The population is heterogeneous. The indigenous people are largely the Ndamba, Mbunga and Pogoro tribes and the population today constitutes also the descendants of Lipangalala, Ndwangira and Mfalikuivahaa, who as leaders from Zululand and Southern Africa arriving in Ifakara and the region as of the late 1860s (Larson 1976:14). Other ethnic groups include Hehe, Sukuma, Bena, Gogo, Ruguru, Kyurya, Pare, and Chagga. In terms of religion, Christians outnumber Moslems and pagans because of early settlements of missionaries in the area.

A year after the British mandate was pronounced by the League of Nations in 1920s, the Capuchin Mission started work in Ifakara. The Swiss missionary work emerged in a context of acute social and political change. The missionary range of services offered was not only spiritual and pedagogical, but also medical. Christian missions had a reputation as conveyors of European medical science. Sr. Arnolda Kury, from the Franciscan Baldegg congregation of the “Schwestern von der Göttlichen Vorsehung" Baldegger_Schwestern built a small dispensary in 1927. This facility developed over the years and grew considerably when the St. Annaheim maternity hospital was added in 1944. In 1953, Dr. Karl Schöpf designed and built a modern and new hospital, now called St. Francis Hospital, with support from Sr. Arnolda, the powerful parish priest and not least the Capuchin Bishop of the Archdiocese of Dar es Salaam. Today the mission hospitals have become 'health projects' executing 'health programmes' which are sold on the secular and spiritual, as well as private and public, market created by donors in Switzerland and elsewhere.

== Economy ==
Fishing has always been the main economic activity of the people living along the Kilombero River. The river provides different fish species including prawns, sardines, ndipi, mbewe, kitoga, tilapia, mjongwa, catfish, sulusulu, bulu, juju, ngunga, ngufu, ngundu, nguyu, ningu and mbala. The Ndamba are distinguished from the Pogoro of Mahenge highlands and its lowland peripheries by their riverine economy and technology. The technological superiority of the Ndamba lies in their control of canoe transport and grasp of riverine lore, which enables them to slip into vast and complicated waterways and survive there for lengthy periods. For a long time, Larson (1976) notes, the Ndamba gained access to the fertile alluvial fans only during the dry season. Other subsistence activities include hunting and cultivation. Today, people also farm. While rice is the main food stuff, sugarcane, maize, millet and wheat are essentially grown for food and trade.

== Environment and geography ==
Ifakara largely occupies the central position on the fertile alluvial fan of Kilombero valley land. It is an authentic savannah grassland with natural grass fields that are green during the rainy season and brown in the dry season. Some exceptions are the beautiful evergreen banks of the Kilombero River and cultivated lands.

Daytime temperature in the region ranges from 32 degrees Celsius in June and 39 degrees Celsius in December. Night temperatures are only 2-4 degrees lower than daytime temperature.

== See also ==
- Assistant Medical Officer
- Clinical officer
- Railway stations in Tanzania

== NGOs in Ifakara ==
- SolidarMed Solidar Suisse
- Eye Care Foundation
- Plan (aid organisation)
- Girls Education for Climate Action (GECA organisation)
- Ifakara Community Group (ICG)
- Bakhita Girls
- Codert-Community Development and Relief Trust
- MSABI
- Friends of Kilombero
- Provision Charitable Foundation
- Southern Tanzania Elephant Program https://stzelephants.or.tz/
