= Mahenge =

Town in Ulanga District, Tanzania

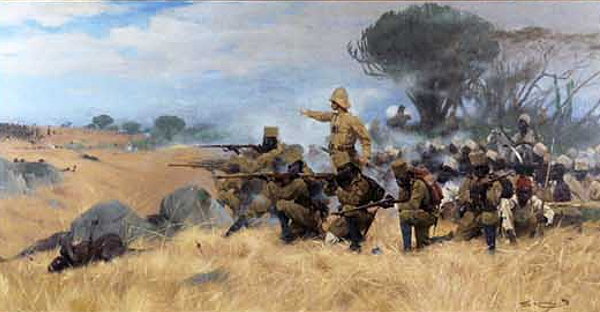
Battle of Mahenge, 1905

Mahenge is a town in the Mahenge Mountains of Tanzania. It is the headquarters of Ulanga District in Morogoro Region.There is a hospital, a market, and primary schools.

== History ==
On 30th, August 1905, 16,000 Ngindo warriors capture Mahenge from the German colonists during the Maji Maji Rebellion.

A Catholic Capuchin mission was established around 1897, and there is now a St. Francis Kasita Seminary at Mahenge. The Diocese of Mahenge was established in 1964. The German East African officer, Theodor von Hassel died here in 1935. His son, Kai-Uwe von Hassel later became the Minister President of Schleswig-Holstein.

Mahenge was captured by Belgian colonial forces under Armand Huyghé during the Mahenge campaign in October 1917. Huyghé was knighted Armand Huyghé de Mahenge in 1933 in recognition of his role in the town's capture.

== NGOs in Mahenge ==
- SolidarMed Solidar Suisse
- Eye Care Foundation
