= Malinyi District =

District in Morogoro, Tanzania

Malinyi Malinyi (Swahili)
- District
- Malinyi District of Morogoro Region
- Coordinates: 8.8645978°S 36.075705°E
- Country: Tanzania
- Region: Morogoro Region
- District: Malinyi District
- Headquarters: Malinyi

Government
  - Type: Council
  - Chairman: Pius G. Mwelase
  - Director: Joanfaith John Kataraia

Population (2022)
  - Total: 225,126
- Time zone: EAT
- Postcode: 67xxx
- Area code: 023
- Website: District Website

Malinyi District is a district of the Morogoro Region of Tanzania.

In 2022, the Tanzania National Bureau of Statistics reported there were 225,126 people in the district.

== Demographics ==
Around 60% of the people in this region are illiterate.

== Sights ==
Kilombero Game Reserve: The District shares part of the Kilombero River Game Reserve. The reserve is home to large numbers of buffalo, elephant, zebra, crocodile and Colobus monkeys.

== NGOs in Malinyi ==
- SolidarMed Solidar Suisse
- Eye Care Foundation
