= Luguru people =

Ethnic group from Morogoro Region of Tanzania

Luguru
Waluguru
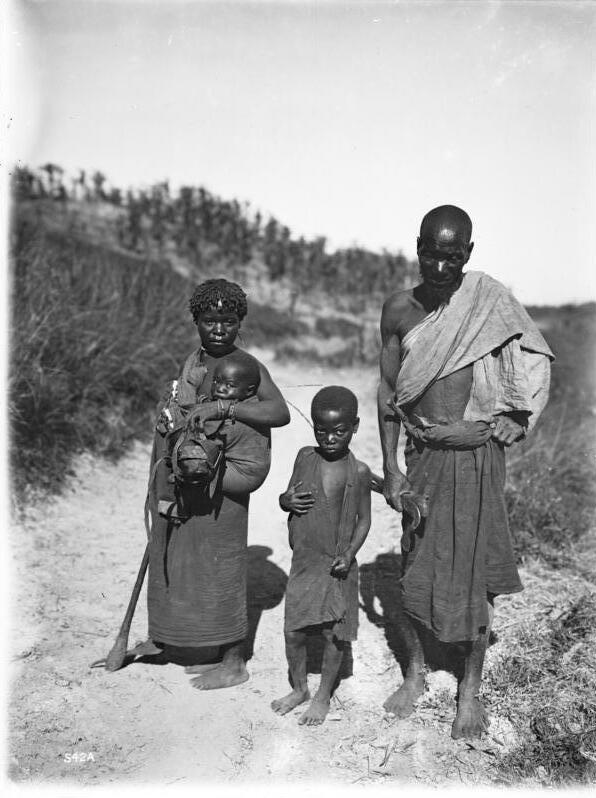
- Luguru family c.1900s

Total population
- 692,000 (2001)

Regions with significant populations
- Tanzania Morogoro Region (Morogoro District) (Morogoro Urban District) (Mvomero District) (Kilosa District) Pwani Region (Kibaha District)

Languages
- Laguru & Swahili

Religion
- Majority Islam, Minority Christianity and African Traditional Religion

Related ethnic groups
- Zaramo, Kutu, Kami, Nguu, Kaguru & other Bantu peoples

- Person: Mluguru
- People: Waluguru
- Language: Kiluguru

The Luguru also known as Rugulu, Lugulu (Swahili: Waluguru) and historically included the Kami are a Bantu, matrilineal ethnic group from northern Morogoro Region of Tanzania specifically indigenous to Morogoro District, Mvomero District and Kilosa District of Morogoro Region and Kibaha District of Pwani Region in Tanzania. They speak the Bantu Luguru language and are native to the Uluguru Mountains that are named after them. In 2001, the Luguru population was estimated to be at about 692,000. Most Luguru are Muslim while a minority are Christian. However, many traditional beliefs and practices are still extant among them.

== History ==
Centered around the Uluguru Mountains, the Luguru are essentially a mixed group of coastal Bantu people. Over time, the term has been expanded to encompass nearby Bantu lowland populations. The entire region is referred to as Ukami on the oldest published maps, but the Kami are currently considered an eastern lowland branch of the Luguru rather than an independent group, despite having their own distinct language

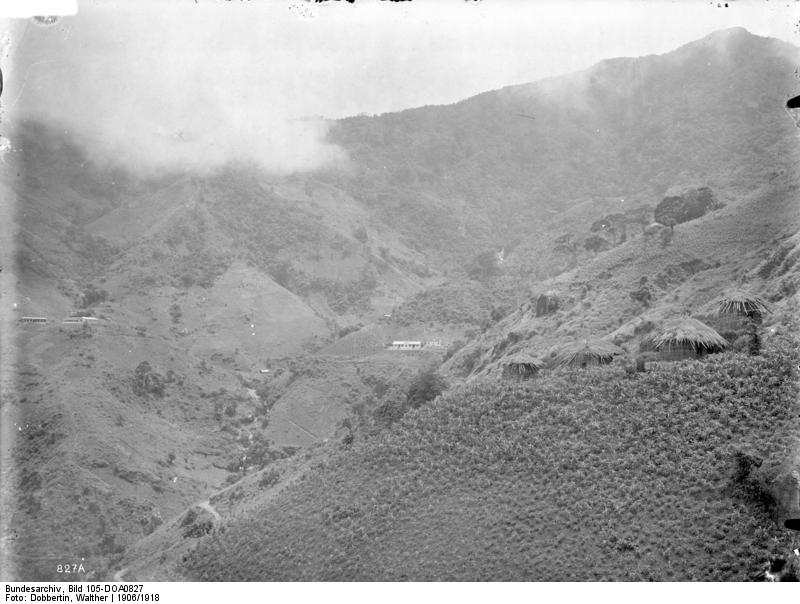
Uluguru mountains c.1900s

The Uluguru Mountains were once inhabited by dispersed populations from other regions, particularly from the south of the Morogoro Region. These Bantu settlers developed into an agricultural mountain people who shared a language and culture but who also had strong local political and cultural differences, as is the case in many of the mountain regions where communication is challenging. Most historians agree that the oldest continuous settlements are in the western Uluguru areas of Bunduki and Mgeta.

For many years, the Luguru region was well-known for its rainmakers, the most renowned of whom went by the name Kingalu and served numerous nearby communities. Peoples from the south often raided the mountains prior to European colonization. These mountains' northern and southern slopes overlook some of the principal caravan routes that ran west from the coast to the Central Lakes of Victoria and Tanganyika.

At the present location of Morogoro town, armed raiders led by a Zigula king named Kisabengo founded a fortified settlement called Simbamwene in the middle of the 1800s. In addition to enslaving and raiding nearby peoples on the plains, this settlement was involved in providing services for the massive flow of caravans that passed through this region. The attempt by Kisabengo to seize control of the Uluguru Mountains seems to have failed. By the time the Germans conquered the country in the 1890s, he had received the Germans' recognition and greatly benefited from their assistance.

The Luguru were one of a few traditionally matrilineal communities in East Africa. Each local matrilineage served as the center of a separate political entity prior to European colonial rule. But occasionally, a great rainmaker or lineage leader gained respect (Chamilandege or Sengwa) from other groups and exerted influence outside of his kin group, sometimes even outside of the Luguru. Although a trend was not fully institutionalized by the Luguru. This extremely acephalous society was not formally unified until colonial rule. Prior to this, any local unity that did exist was founded on ephemeral ritual claims made by individual leaders, marital alliances, and cognatic ties between lineages through women.

The British created a Native Authority in the 1920s, initially under two sultans they selected from a number of notable lineage heads, after the Germans introduced resident akidas over the Luguru. With the help of an assistant sultan, these were united under a single sultan in 1936. They had headmen and subchiefs, a common Native Authority, a common court system, and administrative clerks. Since Tanzanian independence in 1961, this has undergone a total restructuring, thus fully eradicated by 1962 along with other native rule.

Uzaramo, Ukami and Uluguru Map from the 1890s

== Matrilineal system; clan and lineage ==
There are more than fifty exogamous matrilineal clans among the Luguru (Lukolo, Lukero, and Kungugo). Although the clans are not land-owning entities, their histories and customs link them to specific general regions of Uluguru. They are not linked to any dietary or totemic restrictions either. Although they might not marry, some of these clans are connected to one another. Some maintain that such clans should not marry each other, and some are also associated as special ritual and joking partners. It is also claimed that some patrilineal groups among the Luguru exist, and their sole purpose appears to be to spread food prohibitions.

Every matri-clan is further subdivided into several matrilineages, each of which is linked to a specific land area that the lineage has corporate rights over. The matrilineage was the fundamental political unit of the Luguru in the past; it not only approximated settlement groups, but its membership dictated political allegiance in the settlement and in retaliating for feuds. Tombo dwkuru (large breast), tombo dukati (middle breast), and tombo dudogo (small breast) are the lineages that are ranked according to seniority. Historian McVicar refers to these units as mlango. They appear to be ranked according to specific rights to perform ancestral propitiation ceremonies, though there are not enough details available.

Each lineage has its own insignia, such as a stool (mkunga), an axe (mambaza), a hat (fia) and hatband (kilemba), a wrist-bangle (mhande), a staff (tenge), and a drum. Young and Fosbrooke estimate that there are about 800 such lineages. Mlunga is another term for these insignia. Typically, lineage heads are men from the matrilineage; women or sons of lineage men are only occasionally selected in exceptional and brief situations. These positions' successors are occasionally selected at the predecessor's funeral and occasionally prior to the current head's passing. In any event, it appears that other lineage heads from nearby regions attend these ceremonies.

To succeed to a name, the head of a lineage is said to kutawala jina. He is Insignia's owner, Mwenye Mlunga. Because a given name is always associated with a matrilineage, a lineage head and owner of regalia will always share the same name as all of his predecessors. In addition to overseeing land distribution and other potentially contentious issues, the lineage leader is responsible for organizing significant ceremonies to appease ancestral spirits for fertility, rain, and protection from misfortune and other issues.

Slaves who were captured or received as compensation for wrongdoing were frequently married into families in the past. In terms of their rights to land and office, descendants of female slaves continue to enjoy a quasi-alien status because they were never fully assimilated. Although this would seem to be challenging in the case of uxorilocal marriage, Luguru are reported to have engaged in a type of mother-in-law avoidance.

Usaramo, Ukami und Uluguru Mountains c.1890s)

== Lifestyle ==
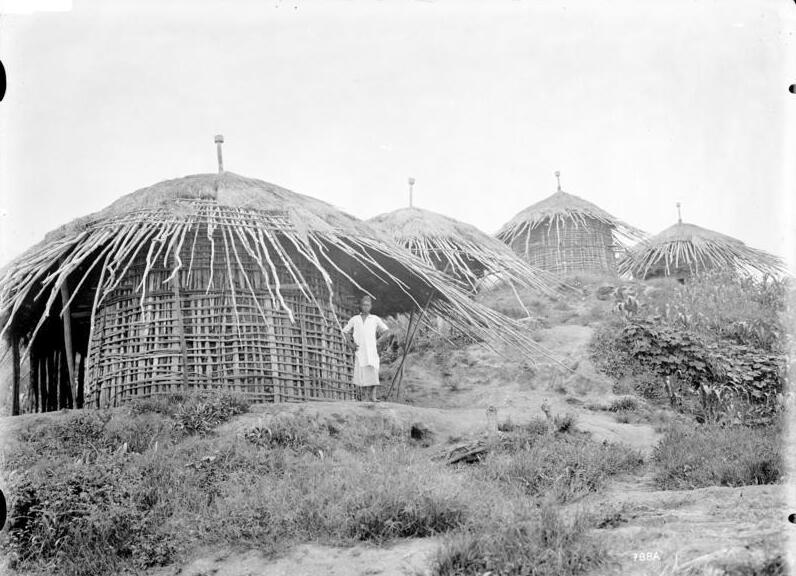
Uluguru homes c.1900s

The Luguru are permanent farmers. Historically, due to a lack of metal, digging sticks (muhaya) and wooden hoes (kibode) were utilized. When planting grains such as sorghum and millet, the digging stick served as a dibble. Men and women both farm, but women plant seeds. Both men and women would harvest. Scarecrows are frequently designed to ward off rodents and birds from crops.

Hill rice is a staple in the east, while sorghum and maize (the latter introduced in the 17th century) are in the west. People in every region grow some vegetables, beans, peas, cassava, bananas, and sweet potatoes. Coffee is also grown in some mountainous regions, though it has not been very successful, as in the Kilimanjaro region and Mbeya. Significant amounts of fruits and vegetables are grown in the eastern mountain region for export to the city of Dar es Salaam as well as the town and estate residents.

In the west, mountain streams are used for limited irrigation. Even in the tsetse-free mountains, the Luguru have no cattle, only chickens and a few sheep and goats for livestock nomenclature. Typically, livestock are tethered, and there are too few to herd. Poisons are used to catch fish in streams, but hunting is minimal. In the past, small game like antelope was occasionally hunted, and wood rats and monitor lizards were a critical source of protein.

By the mid-20th century, the biggest sisal estates in East Africa were found in the lower, drier plains that encircle the Uluguru Mountains. The large wage labor force on these estates has created a significant market for many Luguru products, even though Luguru have not entered such labor in significant numbers. Luguru cultivation in these plains areas requires a lot more shifting cultivation than in the mountain regions.

While men create tools, Luguru women create pottery, weave sleeping mats, and weave baskets from wild grass. Building houses is a job that both men and women do. Beer and food are made by women only. Wooden mortars and pestles are used to prepare staple grains. Although many rectangular banda- or tembe-type houses are still constructed in the mountains, the majority of the Luguru live in the traditional round house (msowge), which is shaped like a beehive.

Some people in western Uluguru exchange food for handicrafts. Excellent ceremonial staves, combs, and other tools with significant artistic value were carved by the Luguru in the past, but not much of this type of carving is done now. Hard tools were typically made of bastard ebony because iron appears to have been extremely rare. Pool water was collected and used to make salt.

== Religion ==
Most Luguru are Muslim. However, many traditional beliefs and practices are still extant among them. Some Luguru are Christian.

Although the Luguru believe in a supreme deity (mulungu), the majority of their religious rituals are devoted to placating ancestral spirits (wazimu). The matrilineal lineage head supervises these rites, called kutambika, though some are performed by clan joking partners (watani). These rituals take place in sacred groves, which are the places where ancestors are interred. After ceremonies, participants don lugenge bracelets. During difficult times and to make rain, ancestral spirits are called upon, and divination is used to pinpoint issues and find answers. When spirits take possession of living relatives, they are exorcised by giving the possessed people their names.

One hut per matrilineal area, known as kibanda cha mizimu, is constructed specifically for the purpose of propitiating ancestors. Lineage leaders honour ancestors by performing rituals during the first rains. Reflecting political power, some rainmakers have expanded their influence over large areas. In rituals known as kulimbua or kuzirula, the head of the lineage offers the first fruits at the crossroads or eats some himself before others can. Kuhoza, or stored harvests, are accompanied by charms or medicines to protect and purify them.

While minor acts of propitiation, like scattering food, beer, or flour on graves, take place during life crises, major events involve the slaughter of goats or chickens. Beliefs in evil spirits (shetani) possessing people have been introduced by Islamic influence. Amulets purchased from diviners are used by people to ward off bad luck and witchcraft. Luguru scatters medicine bundles (kago) in fields to deter crop theft because they are thought to make trespassers sick.

== Land and property ==
Members of a local matrilineage are the only ones with inalienable land rights under the land tenure system described. Both men and women have inalienable rights to the land because these rights are individual and gender-neutral within the family. Family members of these people, however, might be allowed to use the land without having official rights. Children born to couples living in a father's matrilineal territory are therefore regarded as lineage children (mwana) rather than members or landowners, and their access to land rights is restricted. In addition to the initial payment known as rubaka, which mainly acknowledges outsider rights rather than making money, outsiders wishing to use such land must also make a ngoto payment, which is a small in-kind contribution to the head of the lineage. The lineage head usually supervises the storage of ngoto grain at a widow's homestead within the lineage.

Individuals in many families obtain land through their respective ancestries, resulting in scattered plots that may be several miles away. By requiring others to get permission before planting permanent crops or trees, the owner of a tree or crop effectively retains complete control over the planting, giving them long-term control. Regardless of a person's gender or marital status, crops grown on personal plots, known as gani, are managed exclusively by the grower and passed down to their descendants. On the other hand, lima, or goods made by joint labour, are managed collectively and split equally in the event of a divorce.

Although colonial authorities did not specify the precise duration of inactivity, long-unused plots typically return to the lineage's common land. Although children of non-ancestral outsiders may inherit crops from their father's land, they must obtain permission from a lineage head to access it. This is in contrast to the matrilineal inheritance of land rights. People from other areas can ask the head of the lineage for more land, but since there is a shortage of land, this is usually discouraged nowadays. Land availability was probably higher in the past when communities were bigger and land was less crowded.

== Birth ==
In Uluguru, it was common to blame a woman's difficult childbirth on her adultery or hidden sins, and she was urged to come clean. The mother and child are confined for a week after delivery, and the husband is not permitted to see them during this time. The mother and child are shaved, marked with flour, anointed with oil, and given the child's childhood name during a ceremony known as kulawa kunzi on the seventh day. The duration of the husband's sexual abstinence from his wife, which is frequently associated with the nursing period, ranges from two months to more than a year.

Certain foods, such as certain beans (kunde), eggs, twin bananas, and pregnant animals, are forbidden by expectant mothers. In the past, some twins, albinos, or breech babies were killed as part of playful rituals; some stories say both twins were killed, while others only mention one. Sometimes children who cut their upper teeth first were given to their joking partners. Individuals with abnormalities and twins were disposed of at specific locations known as mahuto, which others avoided.

== Initiation ==
Although circumcision was not customary among the Luguru, it has gained popularity recently and was probably brought from the Sagara around 1910. Initiation ceremonies were traditionally performed for both boys and girls, though the specifics differed greatly between areas and between communities in the Uluguru mountains and lowlands.

Initiation for boys included shaving, confinement, and teaching on appropriate sexual behaviour and tribal lore by a specialist (muhanga). Known by a number of names, including konghongo, kukula, and lusona, these rituals frequently involved time spent in seclusion indoors, occasionally for as long as it took to transport the boys into the bush for additional training. Boys were given new names, anointed, dressed in new clothes, and celebrated with a feast of emergence (mlao) after the rites.

In contrast, a year or longer after their first menstruation, girls went through a period of seclusion known as kumbi, which was characterised by festivities (ngoma ya tumi or kuvunja ungo) and a second feast (ngoma mwikiro). Girls were fattened, taught sexual lore (sometimes with figurines), and had their genitalia left uncut while in seclusion. The girl was shaved, anointed, decorated, and carried on the shoulders of young men after the ceremonies (mkole or gali-gali) that marked the end of the rites. Traditionally, girls were frequently married soon after their emergence ceremonies and engaged before reaching puberty. Elderly people in the community from various generations gave sexual education.

== Marriage ==
Although local customs and terminology show considerable regional variation, the early documentation of Luguru terminology indicates that many of the terms are of Swahili origin rather than the native Luguru language. Usually, a go-between (msenga), the suitor's family chooses, is involved in marriage arrangements. In the past, girls were frequently married right after their debutante ceremony and engaged for several years before they reached puberty. Known as kifungo, ngwale, or vilama, the first bridewealth payment typically consisted of chickens, cloth, ornaments, and small sums of money. Historian Kimmenade claims that the groom performed bride service for the bride's parents and that said amount of money was given to the bride's father (kushika uchumba) and another four to her mother's brother (fupo). Additionally, the groom was given land to use during the marriage, and he would eat dinner with his future father-in-law while giving his mother-in-law a chicken (mbandula).

By the 19th century, the bride's maternal and paternal relatives split the bridewealth equally, with the groom's father providing most of the payment. Cory claims that the total amount varies widely. After the initial payments, the couple's family members meet at the bride's house to determine the final amount (ngwe, mwere, or kitangura), which can be paid in cash, chickens, goats, or cloth. A portion of the payment is typically given to the bride's father (barua or swamu la ndevu) and maternal uncle (gubiko). Kimmenade also reports payments to the bride’s mother (kondavi or mkaju), her maternal grandfather (gweka), and her elder brother (gumbo). The agreed-upon bridewealth may be diminished if the couple will live in an uxorilocal arrangement, and consummation is thought to be necessary for the marriage to be finalised before the full payment is made.

Since it is thought to strengthen land rights, facilitate kin rituals, and avoid disputes, cross-cousin marriage is frequently preferred. These unions, which are regarded as irreversible, are occasionally consummated by blood exchange. Marriages between specific kinship groups are also common, such as a sister's son's daughter and a father's sister's daughter. If the bride chooses not to consummate the marriage, the bridewealth is returned to her. Despite being polygynous, the Luguru have a comparatively low rate of polygamous marriages.

== Burial rites ==
Clan joking partners (watani) conduct the Luguru's funeral and mortuary rites. They are in charge of several ceremonial duties, including cleaning the hut, cleaning and wrapping the body in burial cloth (sanda), and declaring the cause of death. After mourning, they rekindle home fires, perform sacrifices at the grave, and shave mourners. According to some sources, the deceased's head should be facing uphill, with men on their right side and women on their left. However, other sources, such as McVicar and Kimmenade, disagree about whether the body should be flexed. Stones are used to mark graves, which are occasionally found in sacred groves or lineage areas.

For seven days, mourners put out the fires in their huts and refrain from working or cooking. After seven days, fires are relighted, daily tasks are resumed, and a small feast known as pombe ya tanga signifies the end of mourning on the eighth day. The mortuary rites are completed a week later when the clan's joking partners perform libations at the graves during pombe ya kihanza. In order to ascertain the circumstances and causes of the death, family members may later seek the advice of diviners.
