= Sagara people =

Ethnic group from Morogoro and Dodoma Region of Tanzania

Sagara
Wasagara

Total population
- 79,000 (1987)

Regions with significant populations
- Tanzania Morogoro Region (Kilosa District) Dodoma Region (Mpwapwa District)

Languages
- Sagara & Swahili

Religion
- Majority Islam, Minority Christianity and African Traditional Religion

Related ethnic groups
- Zaramo, Kami, Nguu, Kaguru & other Bantu peoples

- Person: Mkutu
- People: Wakutu
- Language: Kikutu

The Sagara or Sagala, also called Kwifa or sometimes called Ziraha are a Bantu, matrilineal ethnic group from northern Morogoro Region of Tanzania specifically indigenous to the Kilosa District and Dodoma Region's Mpwapwa District in Tanzania.

== Population and geography ==
A total of 31,609 people were living in Sagara in 1957. The majority of them live in the Morogoro Region, the southern portion of Kilosa District (18,555), and the nearby southwestern portions of Mpwapwa District (6,581). There is a shortage of trustworthy demographic data. The mountainous areas that make up the core of their ancestral country are home to a sizable population. About two-thirds of the 3,500 square miles that this group resides in are in Kilosa District, with the remaining portion mostly located in the southeast Mpwapwa District. However, it was difficult to pinpoint the exact limits of their tribal area. This region seems to have a similar climate and terrain to Ukaguru. In 1987 the Sagara population was estimated to number 79,000. Most of the Sagara are Muslim.

== History and Matriarchy ==
According to the Sagara, they moved north through the Ruaha Valley from Uzungwa in Uhehe. Kidanamhale, a Bena, was their fabled ancestor. Although the matrilineages within each clan are exogamous, it is unknown if the clans themselves are as well. The Sagara are divided into a number of matri-clans (idalior ikungugo). These clans' names—Bena, Nyonga, Simikwa, Nzelu, Nyagatwa, Hanila, Mpwombwe, Kami, Himbila, Zimimiza, Mlali, Mwenda, Dete, Gwana, Hafimwa, Ponda, Saganza, and Mongela—partially match those of the Kaguru, Ngulu, and Luguru.

The Sagara had multiple headmen and two chiefs during the height of British indirect rule, but these roles were eliminated upon Tanganyikan independence in 1961. The Sagara traditionally resided in fortified communities that were mainly structured around a core matrilineage. In contrast to the few lineage elders who, with ability and experience, ran their own villages centred on their sisters and daughters, the majority of males resided outside of their original community (uxorilocally) and were viewed as being in a rather subservient position. Due to the caravan trade, the region also saw a significant influx of immigrant Africans. A leader (mwenyegoha) was chosen by the local Sagara lineage chief to act as his spokesperson with regard to these strangers. Local matrilineages also had land and were entitled to its distribution.

Only in the hill and mountain regions is it feasible to locate homelands with a uniform Sagara population, while most of Usagara is now sisal plantations with a considerable number of foreign labourers as of the 1950s. Because of the caravan trade, there have long been sizable colonies of foreign Arabs and Africans in the region. Numerous Sagara were converted to Roman Catholicism and Islam.

== Religion ==
Propitiation of matrilineal ancestor spirits was a part of most rituals and celebrations. During droughts, Kaguru and Luguru rainmakers were contacted. Many lineage rites were conducted by joking partners (watani).

Historically Sagara sexes had their upper and lower front teeth filed into triangle notches. With the exception of the crown, both men and women shaved their heads. Women wore a similar apron (usambu), while men wore a tiny bark kilt (ilupato). Both sexes engaged in some decorative scarification of the forehead and sides of the head.

== Birth ==
Some Sagara claim that breech deliveries (kigego) and twins were never killed; others claim that these children were killed or left at a crossroads. The umbilical cord is never cut after delivery; it is left to dry. For seven days, the mother and kid are kept indoors.

== Intiation ==
Sagara youth circumcision was not common in the past, but it is now the norm. During puberty, girls get small cuts on their genitalia. These initiation ceremonies are performed by individuals known as muhunga. Nyemi are the rites for girls.

== Marriage ==
Before a young Sagara person asks her parents to consider his suit, a girl is given a sign of beads that she must accept. Previously paid in chickens, goats, and hoes, bridewealth is now paid in cash. Although it used to be little, bridewealth is reportedly increasing in value. However, the girl's parents reportedly endured a lengthy time of bride-service. The sororate was a practice where a man may have multiple women of the same matrilineage. Widows were traditionally inherited matrilineally by the sons of the deceased's siblings. Cross-cousin unions are permitted.

When a man committed adultery with an elder's wife, he or his family members were frequently lost as slaves and penalised. Smaller fines for hoes and livestock were typically imposed. Bloodwealth was paid in forfeited kin, particularly women, or murderers were killed.
