= Eye Care Foundation =

International charity organisation for eye care

Eye Care Foundation (ECF)
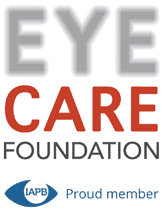
- Founded: 1984
- Founded at: Amsterdam
- Type: International non-governmental organization
- Registration no.: member IAPB
- Headquarters: Amsterdam, Netherlands
- Region served: Worldwide
- CEO: Björn Stenvers
- Website: www.eyecarefoundation.eu

Eye Care Foundation (ECF) is an international charity organisation active in over 20 countries in Asia, Africa and Latin-America.

ECF was founded when Eyecare Worldwide and Mekong Eye Doctors joined forces in 2008. The two organizations shared the same objectives and working together as the current foundation has proved to be more efficient and effective.

== History ==
Eyecare Worldwide (1984) was founded by a Dutch ophthalmologist who was moved by the plight of the high number of people who suffered from blindness that could be cured or even prevented. Mekong Eye Doctors (1993) was founded by a Dutch biochemist after he had been in Thailand to conduct eye research.

Eye Foundation supports projects in Cambodia, Laos, Nepal, Tanzania and Vietnam to prevent and cure visual impairment and preventable blindness. The foundation also helps people who don’t have access to good eye care and can’t afford eye care such as glasses or cataract surgery.

Eye Care Foundation

Eye Care Foundation has offices and hospitals in the Himalayan region (Nepal), Southeast Asia (Vietnam, Cambodia, Laos), Africa (Tanzania) and Latin-America (Suriname, Ecuador).
Toine van Peperstraten is Ambassador for the Eye Care Foundation.

== Countries of operation ==
=== Cambodia ===
The foundation has provided support for eye care in Cambodia since 1997, helping people who are socioeconomically disadvantaged. ECF has a focus on building a strong eye care network and providing quality affordable eye care by putting high quality eye care departments in local hospitals. They have collaborated with the National Program For Eye Health by working in partnerships with Provincial Health Services in the provinces of Ratanakiri, Mondulkiri, Kratie, Svay Rieng, Tbong Khmum, Preah Vihear, Oddar Meanchey and Pailin. ECF has instituted eye care services for groups such as ethnic minorities, people with disabilities, and women and children. In 2007, the Cambodia Office in Phnom Penh was opened.

=== Laos ===
ECF first visited Laos in 2007, and started projects in the Xieng Khouang and Houa Phanh provinces in 2011. Support was given in these provinces to increase the quality and availability of eye care. In 2018, the field office in Laos was opened. Two ophthalmologists completed the ophthalmology residency and started their work on projects in the Houaphan and Saysomboun provinces. In Saysomboun, a new eye care unit was established and equipped.

=== Nepal ===
ECF supports two major hospitals in Nepal; in Mechi and Pokhara. ECF supports eye health programs in Gandaki, Dhaulagiri, Mechi, Gorkha and Karnali. The Nepal office opened in 1988.

=== Tanzania ===
ECF supports the Ministry of Health on two locations: MUHAS University in Dar Es Salaam and Morogoro Region.
In Morogoro region the support is to the only two Referral Hospitals St Francis Referral Hospital (Ifakara) and the Morogoro Referral Hospital (Morogoro) with an Eye Care Department. The St. Francis University College of Health and Allied Sciences with dr. Azaa, mentors the 4 Eye Units in the districts Mahenge, Mlimba, Ifakara and Malinyi District. The other 3 districts are mentored via the Morogoro Referral Hospital with dr. Nassania. To support the increase of future Tanzanian eye care colleagues (Ophthalmologists, Optometrists) ECF supports the Muhimbili University for Ophthalmology Studies (MUHAS) in Dar Es Salaam by Study Grants, Professors, Instruments, Curriculum. ECF is active in Tanzania since 2009 and has had an office in Tanzania since 2018 in Morogoro City.

=== Vietnam ===
ECF supports eye care in Vietnam since 1993. Initially, the foundation was involved in organising eye camps operated by Dutch ophthalmologists and nurses, helping to treat as many cataract patients as possible. ECF has established 2 vision centers in Vinh Long and Dong Thap, with the help of donors, increasing the total to 16 Vision Centers with the Foundation’s support across the Mekong Delta region. The Vietnam office in Ho Chi Minh City opened in 2008.

== Publications ==
- Buki chikitu di Winksy tokarte wowo. ECF: Bonaire, 2024, ISBN 978-9083-423715
- Het boekje over ogen door Winksy. ECF: Paramaribo, 2024, ISBN 978-9083-423753
- The little book of eyes by Winksy. ECF: Kathmandu, 2023, ISBN 978-9083-252087
- Because I carrot, Vitamin A-Rich Recipes for Healthy Eyes. ECF: Amsterdam, 2022, ISBN 978-9090-3598-23
- The little book of eyes by Winksy. ECF: Phnom Penh, 2022, ISBN 978-9083-252001
- Kitabu Kidogo cha macho cha Winksy. ECF: Dar Es Salaam, 2022, ISBN 978-9083-2520-5-6
- The little Coloring Book of eyes by Winksy. ECF: Amsterdam, 2022, ISBN 978-9083-252070
- Siku katika maisha ya Leyla & Ray. ECF: Dar Es Salaam, 2022, ISBN 978-9083-252032
- Một ngày của Hy và Ry. ECF: Saigon, 2021, ISBN 978-9083-252018
- A day in the life of Hy & Ry. ECF: Amsterdam, 2021, ISBN 978-9090-355047
- Mission Eye Care. Johan Enschede Amsterdam (JEA). ECF: Amsterdam, 2019, ISBN 978-9-0830-14029
