= Kutu people =

Ethnic group from Morogoro Region of Tanzania

Kutu
Wakutu

Total population
- 45,000 (1987)

Regions with significant populations
- Tanzania Morogoro Region (Morogoro District) (Kilosa District)

Languages
- Kutu & Swahili

Religion
- Majority Islam, Minority Christianity and African Traditional Religion

Related ethnic groups
- Zaramo, Kami, Nguu, Kaguru & other Bantu peoples

- Person: Mkutu
- People: Wakutu
- Language: Kikutu

The Kutu also sometimes spelled as Khutu or sometimes called Ziraha (Wakutu, in Swahili) are a Bantu, matrilineal ethnic group from northern Morogoro Region of Tanzania specifically indigenous to southern Morogoro District and Kilosa District of Morogoro Region in Tanzania. In 1987, the Kutu population was estimated to number 45,000.

Map showing Ukhutu on the south west c.1890s

== Population and geography ==
There were 17,982 Kutu in the Morogoro Region in 1957, mostly residing in the southeastern Kilosa District and southern Morogoro District. There is no information on population distribution, and a large portion of their land is unusable during the rainy season. Their roughly 2,000-square-mile geographical area, which is primarily in the southern Morogoro District, has unclear borders and is largely deserted. Significant flooding results from the region's twofold rainy season and low plains elevation of less than 500 feet.

== Matriarchy ==
Only a small amount of historic material has been written on the Kutu; historian Gower has summarised the early findings. It's uncertain how much the Kutu resemble the Luguru and Zaramo peoples. During European colonial times, their region had colonies of Nyamwezi and suffered from Arab slavery and Swahili caravan activity.

The Kutu had historically been matrilineal, but Arabs and European colonialism have corrupted them to favour patrilineal succession. Like the Luguru, their matriclans (lukolo) are separated into matrilineages (tombo), each headed by an elder (mwenyemzi,, rnndewa or phazi) who is in charge of ancestor rites and land distribution. Senior women (mke kolo) and younger elders assist the seniors. These positions were passed down through marriage. Matrilineages were historically in charge of managing land, but this may have shifted. The father's mtala, or matrilineage, is equally important. Clans have connections as wagongo, or joking mates.

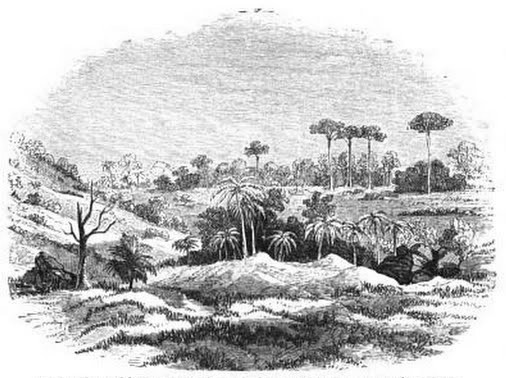
Thermal spring in the Khutu lands, c. 1860s

== Land rights ==
In the past, the Kutu family leader would assign land to an individual, granting the individual the right to own it. Non-members could access land by paying an optional fee, and unused land automatically became clan property. Even though land is typically inherited from the father's side in the current system, a sister's son is nonetheless entitled to a piece of it, known as kome.

Although the individual who made the improvements may be compensated, land improvements such as permanent crops or trees that are placed on land that will eventually return to the family also become part of the reverted property. In the past, a maternal uncle's son would inherit riches and power from his sister, but this tradition has now changed to one that is largely patrilineal.

== Marriage ==
An initial Kutu dowry (vilana) was required before marriage arrangements could be finalised through an intermediary (msenga). The bride's and groom's family received an equal share of this sum. The average bride price in the 1950s was between ten and one hundred and twenty shillings. Earlier payments were frequently made in installments and frequently involved goods like fabric, chickens, salt, tobacco, and hoes, but today's transactions are conducted in cash. Women who remarried received a significantly smaller bridewealth.⁣

== Economy ==
In addition to selling tobacco in inland areas and caravans, the Kutu people also sell cotton and kapok seeds today. They probably rely on maize and sorghum as their primary food sources. In addition to hunting and fishing, they raise a few sheep, goats, and chickens.

== Religion ==
Most Kutu are Muslim. A mosque and a Quranic school can typically be found in most Kutu villages.

== 19th Century Cultural practices ==
The Kutu traditionally filed their front teeth, adorned their chests with intricate scarifications, and wore grass kilts paired with leather loincloths or shoulder covers. Some now-abandoned Kutu cultural customs were followed: children whose upper teeth appeared first were either abandoned at crossroads or given to strangers, while twins and breech babies were put to death. Persistent criminals, including habitual thieves, were sold into slavery.

Government representatives called as akidas represented the Kutu throughout the German colonial era. They had two sultans at first during British administration, but both roles were subsequently combined into one post. Following Tanzanian independence, this sultanate system was eventually abolished in 1962.
