= Mlimba =

Town in Morogoro Region, Tanzania

Mlimba Mulimba
- Location in Tanzania
- Coordinates: 08°46′43″S 35°48′40″E
- Country: Tanzania
- Region: Morogoro Region
- District: Kilombero District
- Elevation: 304 m (997 ft)

Population (2016 Estimate)
  - Total: 34,970
- Time zone: UTC+3 (East Africa Time )
- Climate: Aw

Mlimba is a town in central Tanzania on the plains.

== Location ==
Mlimba is in Kilombero District, in Morogoro Region, in south-central Tanzania, approximately 120 kilometres (75 mi), by road, south-west of Kilombero, where the district headquarters are located. This is approximately 457 kilometres (284 mi), by road, south-west of the city of Morogoro, the regional capital. The geographical coordinates of the town are:08°46'43.0"S, 35°48'40.0"E (Latitude:-8.778611; Longitude:35.811111). Mlimba sits at an average elevation of 304 metres (997 ft) above mean sea level.

== Overview ==
Mlimba is the largest urban centre in Mlimba Ward one of the 35 wards in Kilombero District. Mlimba is also the headquarters of Mlimba Division, one of the five administrative divisions in the district.

There are two health facilities in town, both owned and operated by the Tanzanian government; Mlimba Hospital and a stand-alone Mlimba Maternity Centre. Also nearby is the Mlimba Institute of Allied Health Sciences, a teaching facility.

Approximately 40.5 kilometres (25 mi), north of Mlimba, at the border between Morogoro Region and Iringa Region, is the location of Kihansi Hydroelectric Power Station, a 180 megawatts power plant, across the Kilombero River. It is owned and operated by the government-owned power utility company, Tanesco.

== Population ==
The population of Mlimba was estimated at 34,970, in 2016.

== Tazara Railway ==
The Tazara Railway passes through Mlimba. After Mlimba, the line leaves the plains and enters mountainous territory, as it proceeds west.

== NGOs in Mlimba ==
- SolidarMed Solidar Suisse
- Eye Care Foundation

== See also ==
- Transport in Tanzania
- Railway stations in Tanzania
