= Kimamba 'A' =

Ward in Kilosa, Morogoro, Tanzania

Kimamba A Kata ya Kimamba A
- Ward
- Location within Tanzania
- Coordinates: 6.789664°S 37.1382524°E
- Country: Tanzania
- Region: Morogoro Region
- District: Kilosa district
- Ward: Kimamba A

Population (2016)
  - Total: 6,679
- Time zone: UTC+3 (EAT)

Kimamba 'A' is an administrative ward in the Kilosa district in the Morogoro Region of Tanzania. The ward was created by 1988. In 2016 the Tanzania National Bureau of Statistics report there were 6,679 people in the ward, from 6,079 in 2012.

The ward includes Kimamba Hospital.
