= Kaguru people =

Ethnic group from Morogoro Region of Tanzania

Kaguru
Wakaguru

Total population
- 217,000 (1987)

Regions with significant populations
- Tanzania Morogoro Region (Gairo District) (Kilosa District) (Mvomero District)

Languages
- Kaguru & Swahili

Religion
- Majority Islam, Minority Christianity and African Traditional Religion

Related ethnic groups
- Zaramo, Nguu, Lugulu & other Bantu peoples

- Person: Mkaguru
- People: Wakaguru
- Language: Kikaguru

The Kaguru also known as Kagulu, Megi, Wetumba, Solwa, Mangaheri (Wakaguru, in Swahili) are a Bantu ethnic group from northern Morogoro Region of Tanzania specifically indigenous to Gairo District, Mvomero District and Kilosa District of Morogoro Region in Tanzania. They are bordered to the east by the Ngulu people, to the southeast by the Luguru, to the west by the Gogo of Dodoma, and to the south by the Sagara. They are recognized as one of the four Matrilineal peoples of eastern Tanzania, along with the Zaramo, Luguru, Kutu, Kwere, Zigula, Vidunda, Sagara, and Ngulu.

== Overview ==
The population of Kaguru was predicted to be 217,000 in 1987. Most of Kaguru people reside in Gairo District where they engage in different activities, especially small-scale agriculture.

== Geography ==
The Kaguru homeland is Ukagura (Kaguraland, about 3,600 square miles) is located around 200 miles west of the Saadani and Bagamoyo's seaports. During the eighteen and 19th centuries, the principal caravan route between the Lake Tanganyika and the Indian Ocean travelled via Ukagura, following the Kinyasungwe and Mkondoa rivers. This caravan route later became the Central line railway. The Ukaguru Mountains form part of the Eastern Arc Mountains which stretch diagonally from southwest to northeast along the Eastern Rift system of Kenya and Tanzania. To the west and north lies the central plateau comprising two-thirds of Tanzania.

There are three very different areas, the core, the plateau, and the lowlands. The core is the Ukaguru Mountains, a mass of mountain peaks (6,000–7,000 ft.) that represents a third of the area. In the German Sergeant Bauer's time only a few of its mountains were, and remain today, thickly wooded, for most were already deforested because of the iron smelting industry with its intense need for charcoal and the severe agricultural clearing. After the coming of the Germans much land was preserved as woodland reserved and can be considered beautiful semitropical forestland of great density and abundant rain. The steep terrain had a network of valleys ideal for refugees escaping raids, particularly from the Hehe of the south and the Maasai of the north and is considered the 'heartland'. The word 'Kaguru' refers to the highlands with heavy rain (100 inches on the peaks) that was cool and capable of the regular production of vegetables, and some rice, millet, and plantains. It contained no maize.

Next, the plateau is a land of less rain and more warmth, of large expanses of scrubland and forest, scattered peaks and rocky outcrops, a land of dry and wet seasons. It is a land of periodic famine due to drought, but healthier than the damp and chilly 'heartland'. It was after more peaceful time had arrived that people began returning to the 'Street of Caravans' and the caravan's resting places. Generally the largest livestock holdings were kept here.

The remaining 20 percent had the most extreme contrast between wet and dry seasons. Lying below 2,000 feet altitude it had the least dependable agricultural conditions, being a flat grassy plain, it was most vulnerable to raiding, difficult to defend against these raids, was most prone to cattle diseases, and contained the largest number of non-Kagura who had settled either as refugees or part of the very impressive caravan trade.

== History ==
During Captain Bauer's era, the Kaguru continued to reside in big, fortified settlements on the highland, where there were enough men to defend against raids for food, livestock, grains, slaves and metal goods. The plateau covered 50% of Ukagura surface area and had developed into the location where the majority of Kaguru lived.

The earliest European accounts of the Kaguru gave them various names and seem to be only vaguely aware of them (the Germans with Sergeant Bauer and Charles Stokes make no mention of them). They were lumped together with their neighbors the Gogo or the Sandawe to the west or the mountain and plateau Kaguru were given separate names. They were ethnically placed with other highland peoples who were also matrilineal and had similar lifestyles.

There were no conventional chiefdoms or political structures in place. A small group of leaders would spring up and form a network of connections on the major caravan trading points. It was also where caravans were given the duties of law and justice in exchange for recognition, ammunition, cash and trade goods, and it was also where these leaders were accused of exaggerating their power and influence and attempting to claim special status and privileges. These leaders also promised to defend the Kagura from dangerous, armed foreigners who would kill for resources and labour. While the Germans, British and Arabs, were all too glad to conceive a unified ‘tribal’ area ruled by cooperating kings, some rulers actually carried out their promises. In reality, however, the Kagura were quite close to being stateless. Ukagura was the last site for caravans taking on supplies and water before entering the dry western plains, (Mr. Stokes' caravan is only one example), and it was the first good supply and resting place for caravans after crossing the wild plains to and from the coast with their slow moving shipment of trade goods.

Christian missionaries not only established their headquarters among the Kagura in order to aid their fellow missionaries passing through, but also condemned a wide range of Kaguru customs such as polygyny, ancestral propitiation, and the use of rainstones and other magical medicines.

Alcohol consumption, clothes, Kaguru songs and music, dancing, haircuts, ear-piercing, native jewelry, red ocher for beauty products, as well as numerous aspects of etiquette were all condemned. They were fiercely opposed to female circumcision, but it was hard to stop it because it wasn't done publicly. The missionaries also made a concerted effort to separate Christian recruits from pagans. In most cases, the missionaries failed in their efforts to overcome the opposition. Ninety per cent of Kaguru identity and culture would have been destroyed if they had been successful. They also disrupted the unlawful slave traffic by informing European officials on the coastline through their connections.

== Society ==
=== Overview ===
The Kagura were and remain a matrilineal people (tracing the descent and inheritance through the female) and speaking Chikaguru. They needed to establish broad and diverse relationships since their society was organized around relatives and household groups containing people who could be called upon for support and were a major resource for security and prosperity. Since Ukagura was vulnerable to raids, and at times lacked sufficient manpower to work the land, defend it, and guard against outsiders looking for goods and captives, people not land, were the scarcest and most sought-after resource.

Every third of fourth year a Kagura could expect lean times, while every seventh or eighth year conditions could become very brutal. The Kagura were forever caught between trying to meet their own needs and having to meet the requirements of others who sooner or later might in turn come to their rescue. Diverse social ties are crucial, since harvests and prolonged dryness vary between areas and help can be vital, involving more than just sharing harvests, but also borrowing livestock, or permission to resettle.

The Kagura negotiate rights to land, to rituals, bridewealth, fines and inheritance as part of kin membership determined through birth and marriage. Their society existed of about one hundred matrilineal clans with a wide variety of names such Cat, Goat, Messengers, Spoiled Beer, Rain, Beads, Ravines, Criw, etc., with each containing thousands of members. Each clan was associated with one or more pieces of land that it claimed as its own and each year would organize rituals to revitalize this land. In practice, actual ownership of a clan area was negotiable and could lead to trouble. In Sergeant Bauer's time most Kaguru felt secure within a local area and resisted leaving it.

=== Gender roles and marriage ===
Flesh and blood was identity and came from the mother. The father was important but not as powerful as the ties to the mother and her kin. A child is a member of his or hers mother's clan but not a member of the father's. Ties to the mother were automatic and profound, ties to the father and his kin went into effect only after payments were made. Most Kagura marriages were not considered complete until the birth of children, which only then complicated the varying interplay of loyalties over time.

Men monopolized all ritual and official public life, but women were also essential, whether or not they were married, and had total rights of control over their children. The difference between the two sexes can be illustrated by the kinds of abuse aimed at each. A man may be told he is unmarried or acts as though he were uncircumcised. This can be changed. A woman, on the other hand, can be rebuked for having no children, a flaw in the woman that cannot be changed.

Brother-sister relationships are important. A sister's consent to be married and not run away puts her brother in debt to her. Yet in later live, brothers may encourage their sisters to leave their husbands. The bridewealth received for a sister often enables her brother to marry. A brother hopes to make claims on the loyalty and labor of a sister's sons and bridewealth from her daughters. Men encourage marital instability among their own sisters and nieces while urging marital stability within their own households. Even though the couple's attitudes are taken into consideration, marriage is seen as a competition for alliance, and it is the relatives of a couple who determine marriage. It is this intense competition that provides the broad economic, social, and political security so necessary and so important.

The most important role for men is as husband and brother and they rarely favor divorce, even when the wife is difficult, in contrast many women press for divorce or use it as a threat. The more children a couple have, the more advantage the wife's kin find in divorce. If she is divorced her side withholds a portion of the bridewealth for every child born, even if these died. If there were five or six children born, no bridewealth is returned and the brideservice is not returned. If she remarries, her kin could again secure bridewealth and brideservice.

Divorce is always an economic threat to a husband unless his wife is barren or is considered so unpleasant that the community supports his refund. No divorced man wants to remain alone for long. Mature men cannot easily manage without a wife to cook, and carry water and wood, whereas grown women can manage rather well if raiding is no problem. From a woman's viewpoint the best reason to marry is that she gets a man to appease her own father and mother's brothers, for women are most closely bonded to their mothers and children. The father finds the support of his wife to be vital in order to secure the loyalty of his children.

=== Sexuality ===
Traditional Kaguru natives were highly conservative when it came to public nudity. No adolescent Kaguru would’ve been able to inspect an adult from either sex who was completely naked. Even when showering, men wore a toga-like garment and took great care not to appear naked even when washing. Women wore skirts all the time. All sexual references between parents and children, as well as between siblings, were strictly prohibited. Such remarks would be regarded as perverse and shameless. Grandparents, cross relations, or unrelated people of the same age are supposed to be free to discuss such topics.

There was very little sexual information available to Kaguru youth before initiation. Parents' sexuality was shielded from children who could not even touch the bed of a parent. It is only at initiation that sexual questions can at last be freely mentioned and are a constant and required topic of instruction.

Male circumcision (initiation) is performed at puberty by men in a bush camp (not in a settlement) where the youth remains until he recovers, and consists of removing the foreskin of the penis with a knife. It was said that his childhood has died and he has been reborn as an adult. It is thought to please women because it makes males even more different from females and the sexes are attracted to the opposites of each other.

Female initiation takes place in the seclusion of a house when a Kaguru girl is around 14 years of age. The seclusion could last weeks to months and she was expected to become beautiful (fat and pale). Women inside the initiation house enjoyed singing obscene songs, laughing loudly at jokes, and dancing, it was good excuse to travel and visit. After a night of singing and dancing the girl was taken into the nearby bush, held seated on a hide and cut by an old woman. The cutting on the labia could be extensive, a light nick or not at all. The Kagura did not remove any part of the clitoris, and the female initiate, after receiving gifts of new clothing and masses of beads from her kinswomen, was now ready for suitors and marriage.

=== Death ===
As with most African peoples the community consisted of dead ancestors and the generations still to be born, as well as the living; they lived in an 'age of faith'. Following the death of an ordinary person the spirit goes to an alternative dimension, 'ghostland' (Rejoining the 'Life-Force', but retaining the spiritual identity), where ghosts live in villages much as the living do (they merely change their address), and the arrival of a new person is celebrated just as the loss is mourned by the living. At birth to the living, the ghosts, who have given up one of their members, mourn the loss. Both sides give up one of theirs to the other with resignation and resentment.

Infants, having just made a dangerous journey, have a weak hold on life and may be taken back by the jealous ghosts, while uninitiated youth who die, are also said to have never fully stopped being ghosts and are not extensively mourned. In an orderly world the two dimensions are expected to be separate and not interfere with one another, though the misdeeds of the living do upset the ghosts and they wish to be remembered with sacrifices and hear their names called out. Serious and continuing problems are blamed on angry, disturbed, or confused ghosts for whom rites are then held to placate, cool or quiet them. The most prominent ancestral ghosts are named and wheat flour and the blood of sacrificial animals are poured on the graves.
