= Kami people =

Ethnic group from Morogoro Region of Tanzania

Kami
Wakami

Total population
- 16,400 (2001)

Regions with significant populations
- Tanzania Morogoro Region (Morogoro District)

Languages
- Laguru & Swahili

Religion
- Majority Islam, Minority Christianity and African Traditional Religion

Related ethnic groups
- Zaramo, Kutu, Zigua, Nguu, Kaguru & other Bantu peoples

- Person: Mkami
- People: Wakami
- Language: Kikami

The Kami sometimes historically included with the Luguru (Wakami, in Swahili) are a Bantu, matrilineal ethnic group from northern Morogoro Region of Tanzania specifically indigenous to Morogoro District. The town Mikese, which lies east of Morogoro City, is the locality where the majority of Kami people reside. Mkunga Mhola, Dete, and (Lukonde) Koo are the locations of most Kami people. In 2000 the Kami population was estimated to be 16,411. Most of the Kami are Muslim.

== Extinction of Kami language ==
The Kami language is a Bantu language, sharing substantial lexical similarities with Kutu, Kwere, Zaramo, Doe, and Luguru.

The language is one of the endangered languages facing extinction in Tanzania. According to a study, the 5,518 Kami speakers' number does not represent how proficient they are in the language. There are reportedly much fewer fully competent speakers in the area, according to field studies done during trips in 2008, 2009, 2014, and 2016. Since no children or teenagers were found to be skilled in the language, it is regarded as endangered.

The youngest person interviewed, who was in his forties at the time, could comprehend Kami but could not speak it. Tanzania's national language, Swahili, is becoming more and more common as the only language allowed alongside English in government, media, educational institutions, and places of worship. In spite of this, the main danger to Kami's survival is the local language Luguru, which is more of a risk to its survival than Swahili itself.
