= Kilombero District =

Coordinates: 8.1327°S 36.6818°E

- District
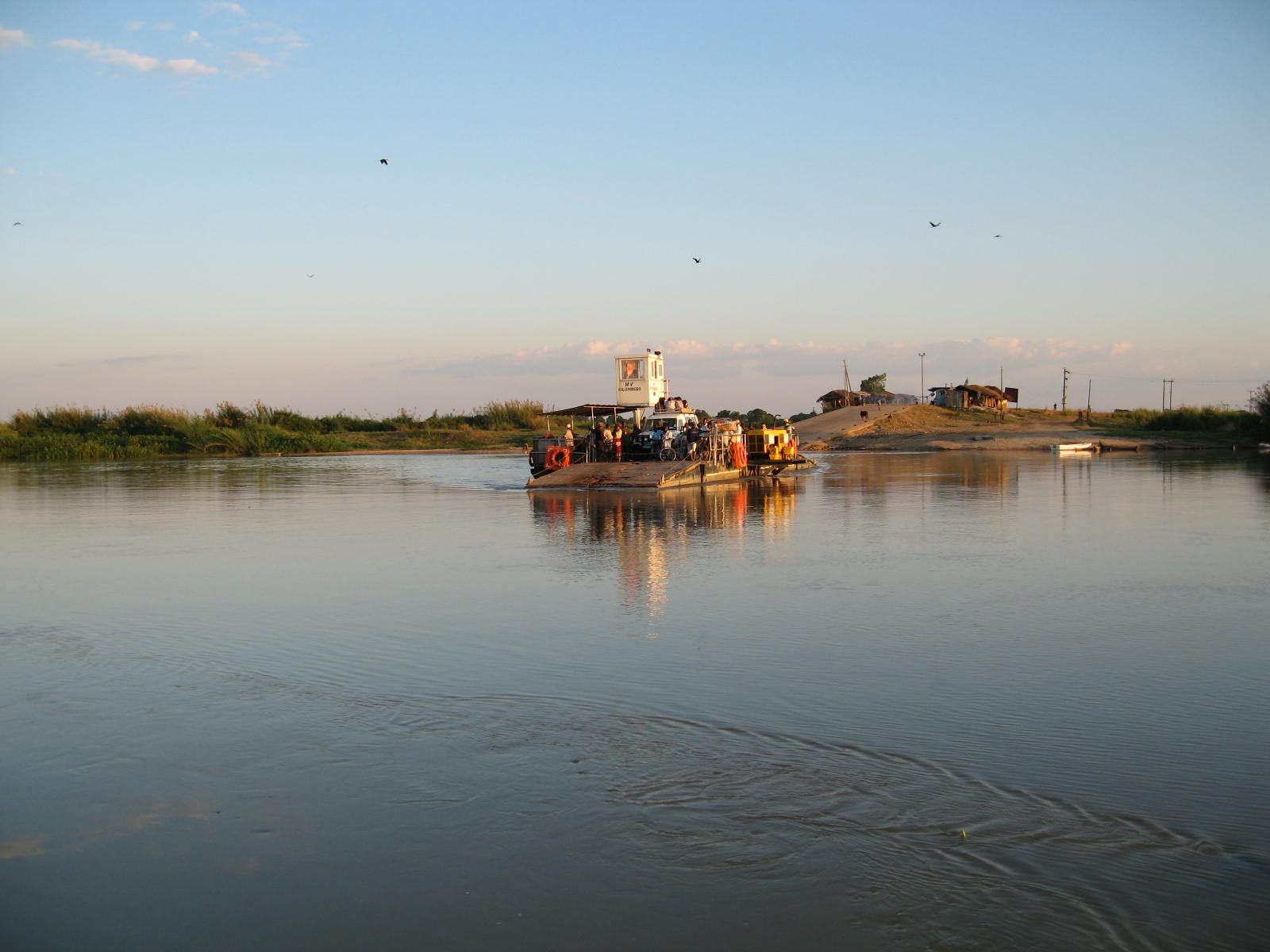
- Ferry crossing the Kilombero River near Ifakara, Kilombero District

- Kilombero District of Morogoro Region
- Country: Tanzania
- Region: Morogoro Region

Population (2002)
  - Total: 321,611
- Time zone: UTC+3 (EAT)
- Area code: 023
- Website: Country Website

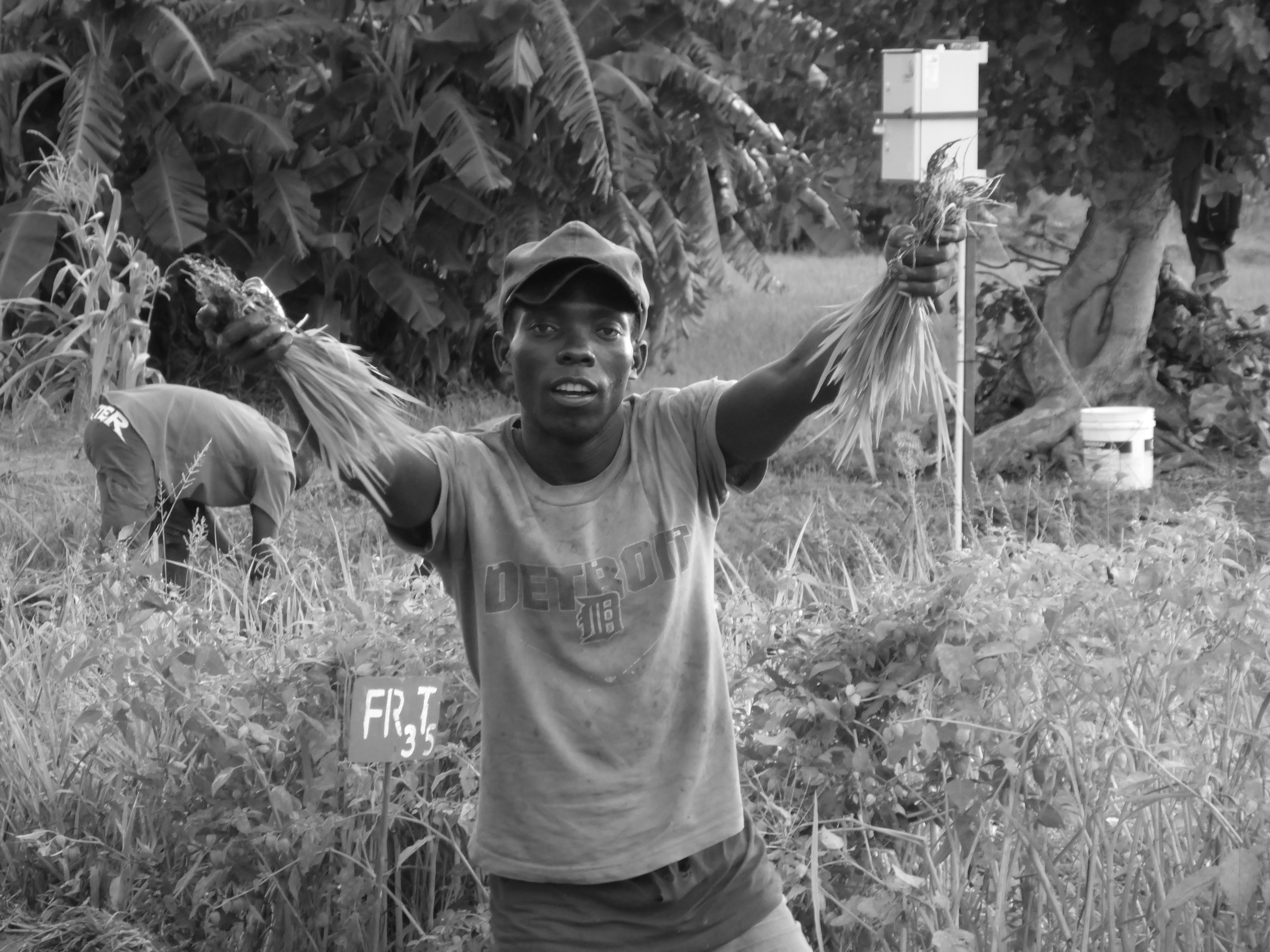
Farm employees in the Kilombero flood plain preparing rice seedlings for transplanting

Kilombero District is a district in Morogoro Region, south-western Tanzania.

The district is situated in a vast floodplain, between the Kilombero River in the south-east and the Udzungwa-Mountains in the north-west. On the other side of the Kilombero River, in the south-east, the floodplain is part of Ulanga District. The district shares a portion of Udzungwa Mountains National Park with Kilolo District of Iringa.

According to the last census in 2002, the population of Kilombero District is 321,611 The main ethnic groups are Wapogoro, Wandamba, Wabena, and Wambunga and several others in small proportions.

The area is predominantly rural with the semi-urban district headquarters Ifakara as major settlement.

The majority of the villagers are subsistence farmers of maize and rice. There are large plantations of teak wood in the Kilombero and the neighbouring Ulanga districts. In the north-west of the district, Illovo Sugar Company's sugar-cane plantations occupy most of the low lying area.

== Administrative subdivisions ==
=== Constituencies ===
For parliamentary elections, Tanzania is divided into constituencies. As of the 2010 elections Kilombrero District had one constituency:

- Kilombrero Constituency

=== Divisions ===
Ifakara, Kidatu, Mang´ula, Mlimba, Mngeta.Malinyi, Mahenge.

=== Wards ===
Kilombero District is administratively divided into thirty-five wards:
Chisano	Kiberege	Masagati	Mofu
Chita	Kidatu	Mbingu	Sanje
Idete	Kisawasawa	Mchombe	Uchindile
Ifakara	Lumemo	Mkula	Utengule
Kibaoni	Mang'ula	Mlimba	Msolwa Station
Mang'ula B	Mwaya	Signal	Michenga
Katindiuka	Mlabani	Viwanja Sitini	Lipangalala
Namwawala	Mngeta	Igima	Mbasa
Ching'anda	Kalengakelo	Kamwene	

== NGOs ==
- MSABI – Safe Water for Better Health Ifakara – an NGO that focuses on water, sanitation, hygiene, and education
- Eye Care Foundation
- Friends of Kilombero
- TFCG – works on natural forest management and related natural resources management in Tanzania Eastern Arc mountain blocks and coastal forests
- Save Education and Future Development Foundation – promotes access of quality education in rural communities
- Southern Tanzania Elephant Program - STEP is an elephant conservation program based in southern Tanzania. Believing in the importance of strong protected areas and the welfare of people living around their boundaries, STEP works with a range of partners towards long-term security for elephants, a critical keystone and umbrella species of the incredible ecosystems of Ruaha-Rungwa and Udzungwa-Selous.
