= Ulanga District =

Ulanga District Mahenge District
- District
- Ulanga District of Morogoro Region
- Coordinates: 09°00′S 036°40′E
- Country: Tanzania
- Region: Morogoro Region

Area
  - Total: 15,751 km^{2} (6,081 sq mi)

Population (2022)
  - Total: 232,895
  - Density: 14.786/km^{2} (38.296/sq mi)

Ulanga District (Mahenge District) is one of the six districts of the Morogoro Region of Tanzania. the administrative seat is in Mahenge. It covers 24,460 square kilometres (9,444 sq mi) of which 4,927 square kilometres (1,902 sq mi) is in forest reserves. Ulanga District is bordered to the north and west by the Kilombero District, to the east by the Lindi Region and to the south by the Ruvuma Region.

== Demographics ==
As of 2022, the population of the Ulanga District was 232,895. The Wapogoro are the majority ethnic group in Ulanga District.

== Economy ==
Most people are employed in herding and subsistence farming, although there is some traditional fishing. Some mining is done in Lukande Ward.

Roads are poor. There is one gravelled airstrip located in the Selous Game Reserve.

== Administrative subdivisions ==
=== Constituencies ===
For parliamentary elections, Tanzania is divided into constituencies. As of the 2015 elections Ulanga District had one constituency:

- Ulanga Mashariki Constituency (Ulanga East Constituency)

=== Divisions ===
Ulanga District is administratively divided into four divisions.

- Lupiro
- Vigoi
- Ruaha
- Mwaya

=== Wards ===
Ulanga District is administratively divided into twenty-one wards:

- Chirombola
- Euga
- Ilonga
- Iragua
- Isongo
- Ketaketa
- Kichangani
- Lukande
- Lupiro
- Mahenge
- Mawasiliano
- Mbuga
- Milola
- Minepa
- Msogezi
- Mwaya
- Nawenge
- Ruaha
- Sali
- Uponera
- Vigoi
