= Mbunga people =

Ethnic group from Iringa and Morogoro Regions of Tanzania

The Mbunga are an ethnic and linguistic Bantu group from Kilolo District of Iringa Region and Morogoro Region in Tanzania. In 1987, the Mbunga population was estimated to number 29,000.
