= Kilosa District =

District in Morogoro Region, Tanzania

Coordinates: 06°50′S 36°59′E

Kilosa
- District
- Wilaya ya Kilosa, Mkoa wa Morogoro
- Kilosa District of Morogoro Region
- Country: Tanzania
- Region: Morogoro Region

Area
  - Total: 11,773 km^{2} (4,546 sq mi)

Population (2022)
  - Total: 617,032
  - Density: 52.411/km^{2} (135.74/sq mi)

Location of the Kilosa District in Tanzania

Kilosa District is one of the six districts of the Morogoro Region of Tanzania. Its administrative seat is the town of Kilosa. Kilosa District covers 14,918 square kilometres (5,760 sq mi). It is bordered to the north by the Manyara Region, to the northeast by the Tanga Region, to the east by Mvomero District, to the southeast by Morogoro Rural District, to the south by Kilombero District, to the southwest by the Iringa Region and to the west by the Dodoma Region. Kilosa District is home to Mikumi National Park.

According to the 2022 Tanzania National Census, the population of the Kilosa District was 617,032.

== Administrative subdivisions ==
=== Constituencies ===
For parliamentary elections, Tanzania is divided into constituencies. As of the 2015 elections Kilosa District had two constituencies:

1. Kilosa Constituency
2. Mikumi Constituency

=== Divisions ===
As of 1997, Kilosa District was administratively divided into nine divisions.

==== 1997 divisions ====
The nine 1997 divisions were:

1. Gairo Division, the northernmost part of Kilosa District,
2. Kilosa Division,
3. Kilosa Mijni (municipality)
4. Kimamba Division,
5. Magole Division,
6. Masanze Division,
7. Mikumi Division,
8. Rudewa Division,
9. Ulaya Division, the central part of southern Kilosa District.

=== Wards ===
As of 2002, Kilosa District was administratively divided into forty- six wards:

In 2012 the following eight wards became part of the newly created Gairo District:

- Gairo
- Mandege
- Rubeho
- Chagongwe
- Chanjale
- Kibedya
- Chakwale
- Iyogwe

The thirty-eight wards remaining in Kilosa district from 2012:

- Berega
- Chanzuru
- Dumila
- Kasiki
- Kidete
- Kidodi
- Kilangali
- Kimamba 'A'
- Kimamba 'B'
- Kisanga
- Lumbiji
- Luhembe
- Lumuma
- Mabwerebwere
- Magole
- Magomeni, Kilosa
- Magubike
- Malolo (Tanzania)
- Mamboya
- Masanze
- Mbumi
- Mikumi
- Mkwatani
- Msowero
- Rudewa
- Ulaya
- Uleling'ombe
- Vidunda
- Zombo
- Mamoyo

== Transport ==
The town of Kilosa has a station on the Central Line of Tanzanian Railways. It is also a junction for a branch railway to the break-of-gauge transshipment station at Kidatu.
