= Solidar Suisse =

Swiss non-governmental organization

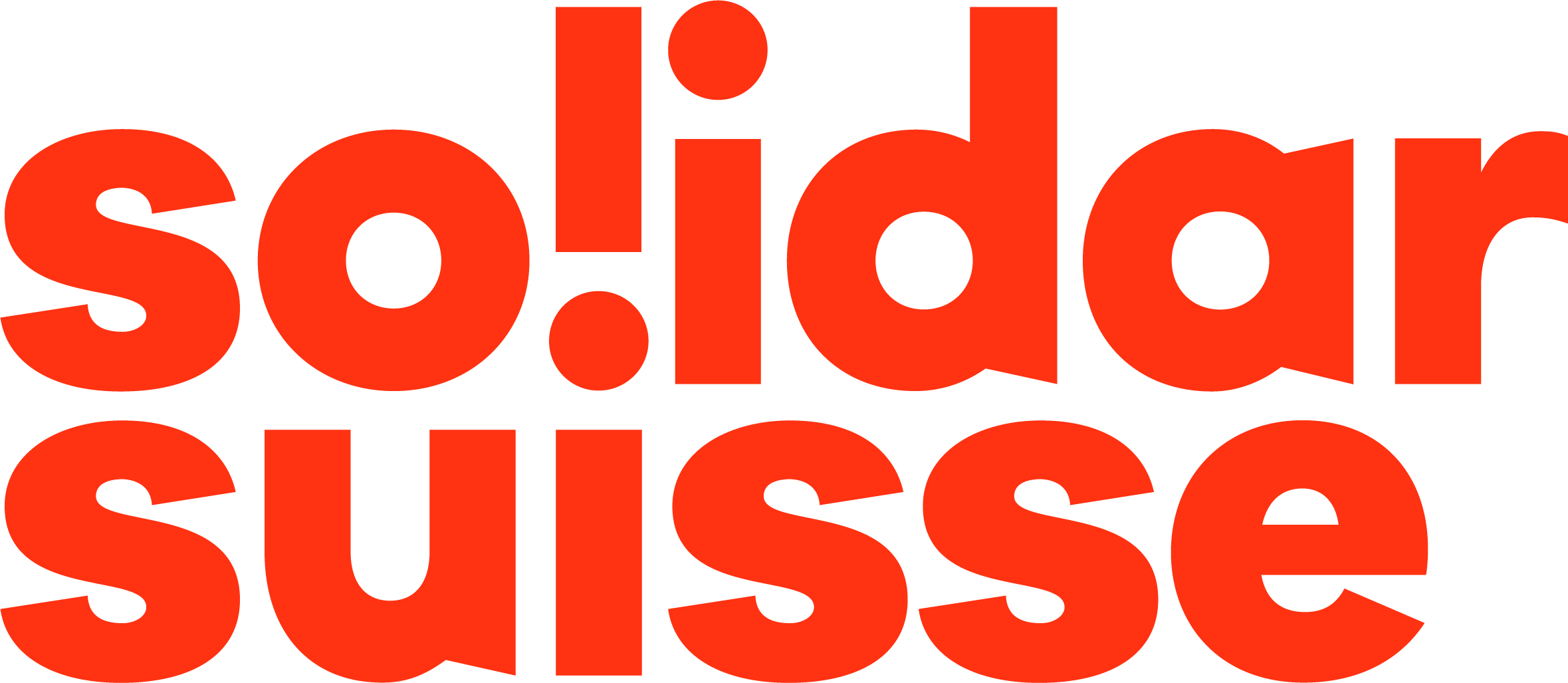
- Type: ONG
- Website: solidar.ch/en/

Solidar Suisse is a Swiss non-profit organization with headquarters in Zurich. It also has a French-speaking Swiss branch in Lausanne and an association in Geneva, Solidar Suisse Genève. As an NGO, it fights for global justice and against extreme inequality. It campaigns for decent working conditions, democratic participation and social justice.

Solidar Suisse is the development organization that became organizationally independent from the Swiss Workers' Relief Association (SAH) in 2005 and was renamed Solidar Suisse in 2011.

== History ==
=== Activities of the SAH abroad ===
In 1936, the Swiss Workers' Relief Organization was founded by the Swiss Trade Union Federation and the Social Democratic Party of Switzerland. Its purpose was to alleviate the effects of the Great Depression and to support workers' families in precarious situations in Switzerland and abroad, in part by funding holiday camps.

The organization soon became involved in Spain to help children who were victims of the Spanish Civil War. During the Second World War, the SAH distributed food parcels in refugee camps throughout Europe and cared for more than 2,000 refugees in Switzerland. In the immediate post-war period, the SAH provided emergency aid, social support and opened children's homes.

In 1949, the SAH was one of the first Swiss relief organizations to become involved in international development aid, working in Greece, Palestine/Israel, Yugoslavia and, after the Algerian War, in Algeria and Tunisia. In 1951, the SAH was also a founding member of the International Association for Workers' Relief (IAH), which was renamed SOLIDAR in 1995. The SAH supported political refugees from the Hungarian uprising, the Prague Spring, the Nigerian Civil War and the Greek junta. Since the 1970s, the SAH was involved in the solidarity movement for Central America, including Nicaragua. In the 1980s and 1990s, the SAH was also active in a large number of countries. In the 1980s, for example, it supported those persecuted by the Pinochet regime in Chile and was active in Bosnia and Kosovo during the Yugoslav wars (1991-2001), while maintaining its activities for the benefit of the population in Switzerland.

A dozen regional branches of the OSEO, however, continue to develop independently activities related to professional reintegration, training or the integration of migrant people

=== As an independent organization ===
In 2005, as part of a reorganization, the former foreign department of the SAH became an independent organization, although it continued to operate under the name Swiss Workers' Relief Organization. Even after the organizational separation, the organization continued its previous international development aid. For example, Solidar supported the victims of the devastating floods in Pakistan (2010).

In 2011, on the occasion of the 75th anniversary of the SAH, the organization was renamed Solidar Suisse, which in addition to the organizational separation also led to the separation of the name from the Swiss SAH associations. The name Solidar Suisse is based on the international network of the same name, SOLIDAR. After Typhoon Hayan (2013) in the Philippines, Solidar Suisse provided short-term emergency aid and was also involved in reconstruction for years. Solidar Suisse also provided emergency aid after the earthquake in Nepal in 2015, for the Rohingya refugees in Bangladesh in 2017, after the earthquake on the island of Sulawesi in 2018, after the Russian invasion of Ukraine and the floods in Pakistan in 2022, and after the earthquakes in Turkey and Syria in 2023.

== Locations of activity ==
In 2024, Solidar is active in 15 countries: Burkina Faso, Mozambique, South Africa, Kosovo, Bosnia, Pakistan, Bangladesh, Türkiye, Syria, Philippines, Sri Lanka, China, Bolivia, Nicaragua and El Salvador.

In Switzerland, ten independent regional Schweizerisches Arbeiterhilfswerk SAH associations (Basel, Berne, Friborg, Geneva, Schaffhausen, Ticino, Vaud, Valais, Central Switzerland, Zurich) are involved in 16 cantons with around 900 employees for disadvantaged people. They provide education, employment and work integration programs for the unemployed and displaced, and provide guidance and assistance to asylum seekers, refugees and migrants.

== National campaigns ==
Since 2008, Solidar has been conducting national awareness campaigns such as "Responsible Public Purchasing – No to Exploitation with Our Taxes", "For a FIFA and Socially Responsible World Cups", "Fair Toys", on toys that have come from China, "Stop food speculation" or "For pans produced in decent conditions". In 2017 it published material promoting the successful integration of asylum migrants. It also takes part in the Popular Initiative "Responsible enterprises – to protect the human being and the environment" and carried out, in 2011, 2013 and 2016, an evaluation of the communal policies for development cooperation and fair purchasing. (Solidar Rating of Commons).

== Presidents of Solidar Suisse since its independence ==
The first president of the independent organization Solidar Suisse was the previous president of the entire SAH.

Year	Presidents
2005-2008	Ruedi Winkler (2003-2005 President of the SAH)
2008-2018	Hans-Jürg Fehr (National Councillor SP)
From 2018-today	Carlo Sommaruga (Council of States SP

The Solidar Suisse Genève association was founded in 2014. The current president is Valery Bragar.

== Solidar Suisse employees ==
Solidar Suisse has its headquarters in Zurich and a branch office in Lausanne. In each country where Solidar is active, there is a coordination office managed by local experts in the field of humanitarian aid and development cooperation. The NGO employs more than 45 people in Switzerland and about 135 people abroad, the majority of whom are local staff.

== Publications ==
Solidar Suisse publishes the magazine "Solidarität-Solidarité" four times a year in German and French, which reports on its international projects and deals with general topics related to development cooperation.
