= Morogoro Region =

Region of Tanzania

Morogoro Region Mkoa wa Morogoro (Swahili)
- Region
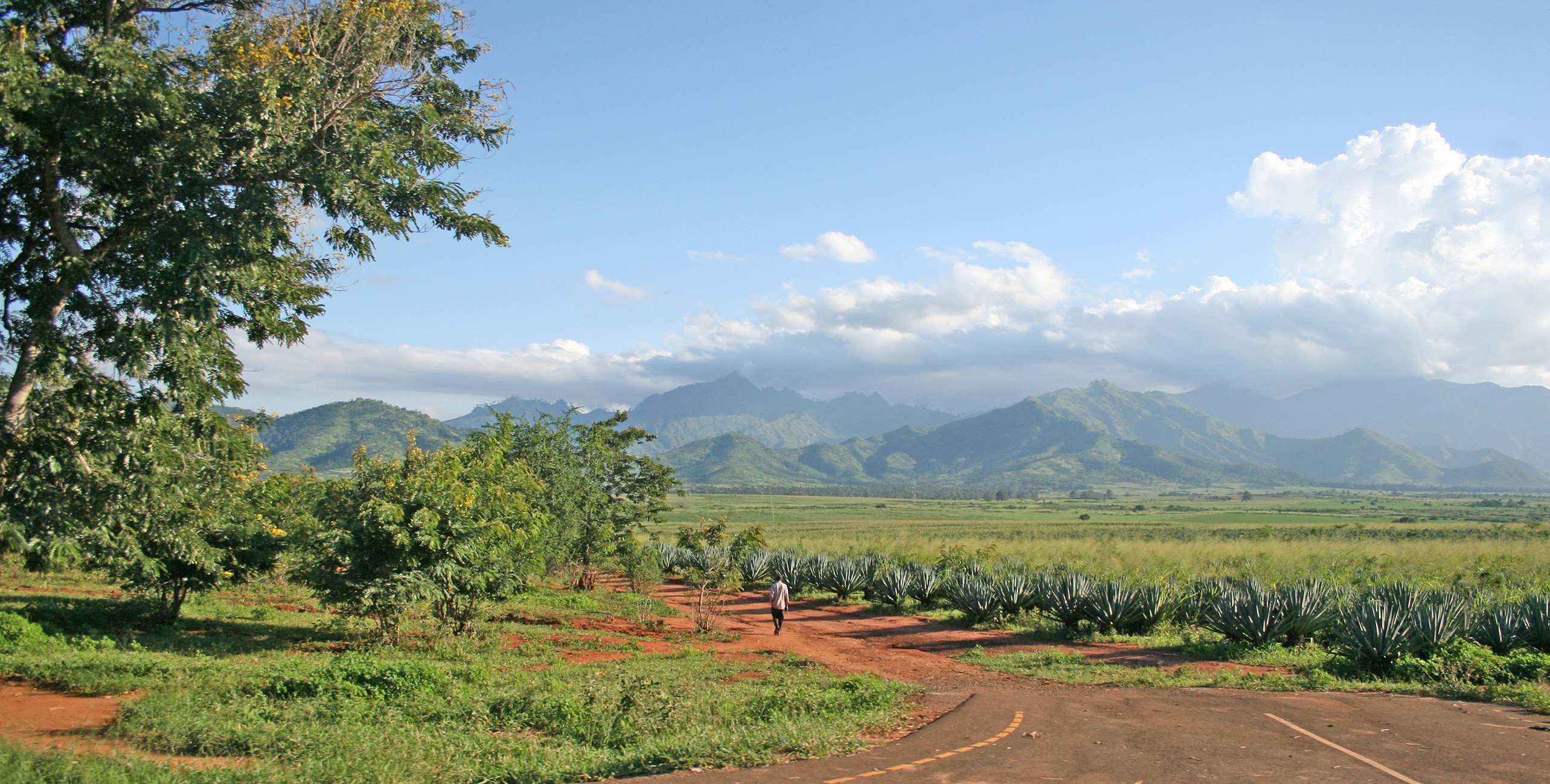
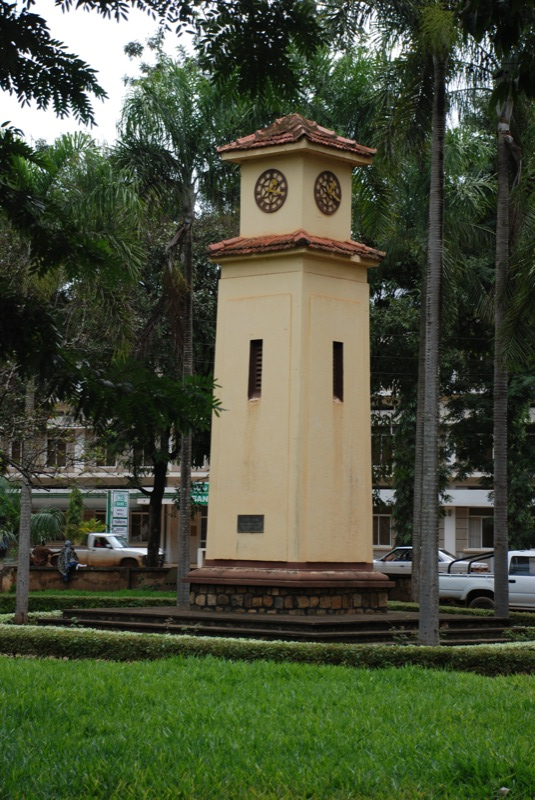
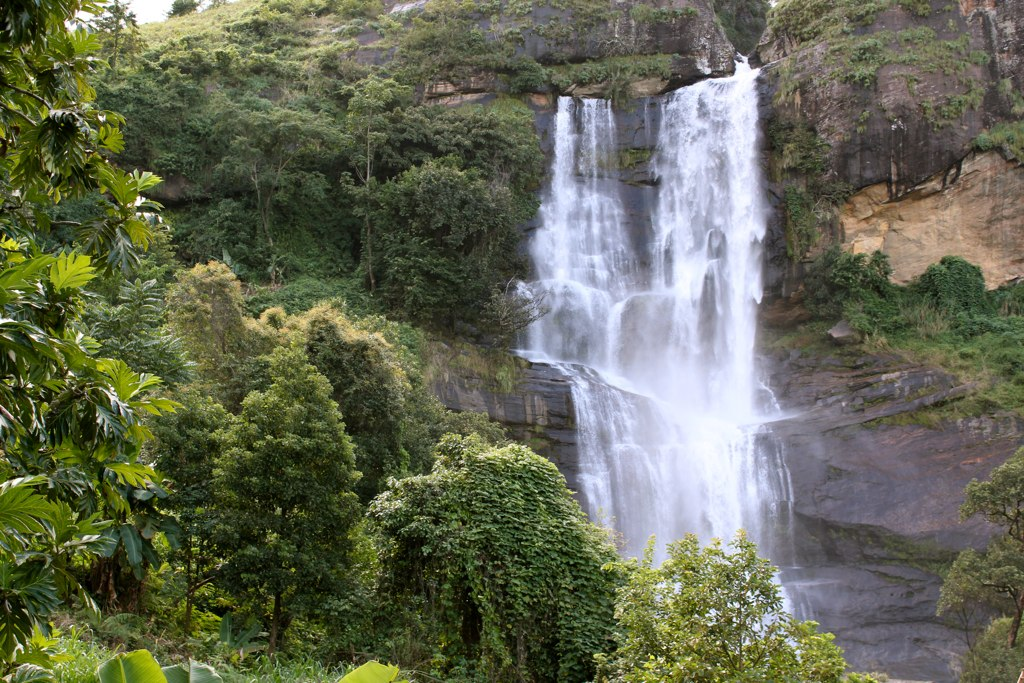
- From top to bottom: Sisal plantation overlooking the Uluguru Mountains in Morogoro, Morogoro City clock tower and waterfalls in the Uluguru
- Nicknames: The Cocoa region; The rice bowl of Tanzania
- Location in Tanzania
- Coordinates: 6°49′40.08″S 37°39′32.76″E
- Country: Tanzania
- Zone: Coastal
- Capital: Morogoro
- Districts: List: Gairo District; Ifakara Town; Kilombero District; Kilosa District; Malinyi District; Morogoro Rural District; Morogoro Municipal; Mvomero District; Ulanga District

Government
  - Regional Commissioner: Fatma Mwasa (CCM)

Area
  - Total: 70,624 km^{2} (27,268 sq mi)
  - Rank: 2nd of 31
- Highest elevation (Lukwangule): 2,656 m (8,714 ft)

Population (2022)
  - Total: 3,197,104
  - Rank: 4th of 31
  - Density: 45.269/km^{2} (117.25/sq mi)
- Demonym: Morogoran

Ethnic groups
  - Settler: Swahili, Sukuma & Maasai
  - Native: Luguru, Ngulu, kutu, Sagara, Vidunda, Kaguru, Mbunga, Ndamba, Pogoro & Ngindo
- Time zone: UTC+3 (EAT)
- Postcode: 67xxx
- Area code: 023
- ISO 3166 code: TZ-16
- HDI (2021): 0.546 low · 12th of 25
- Website: Official website
- Symbols of Tanzania
- Bird: Uluguru bushshrike
- Butterfly: Bebearia orientis
- Fish: Oreochromis urolepis
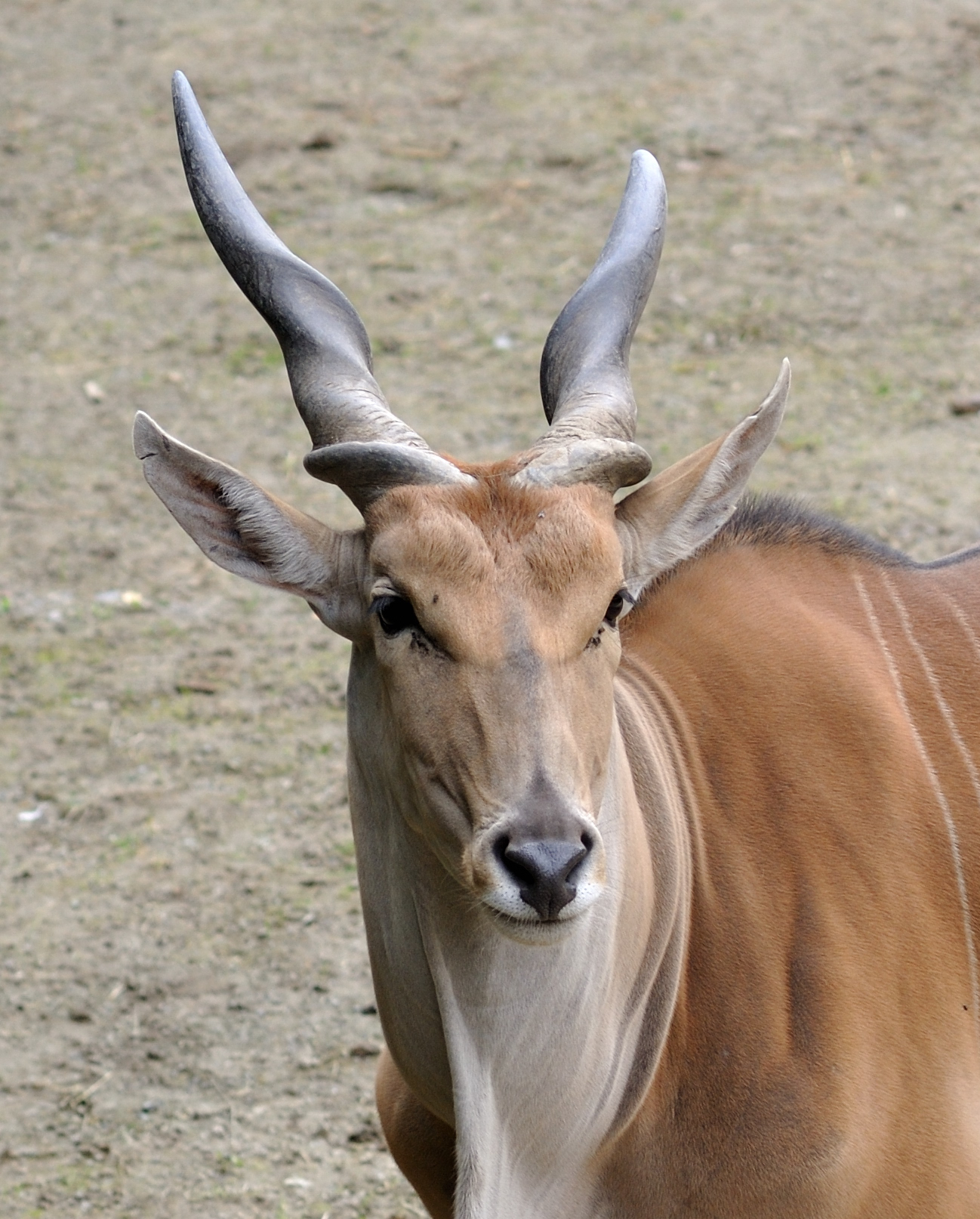
- Mammal: Eland

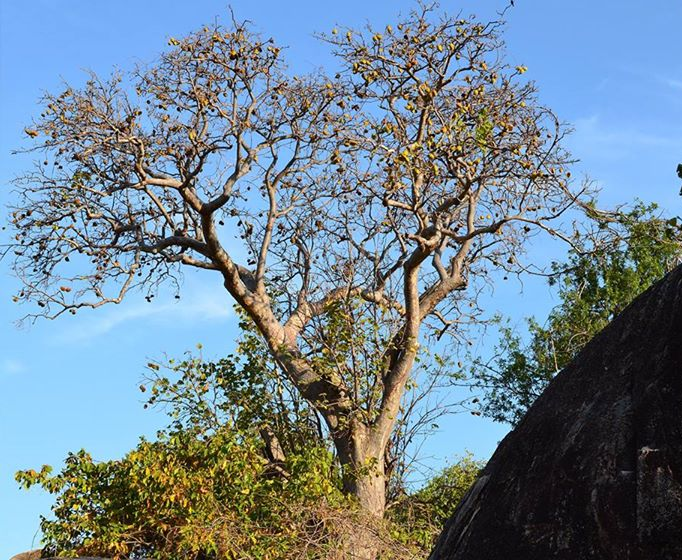
- Tree: Sterculia africana

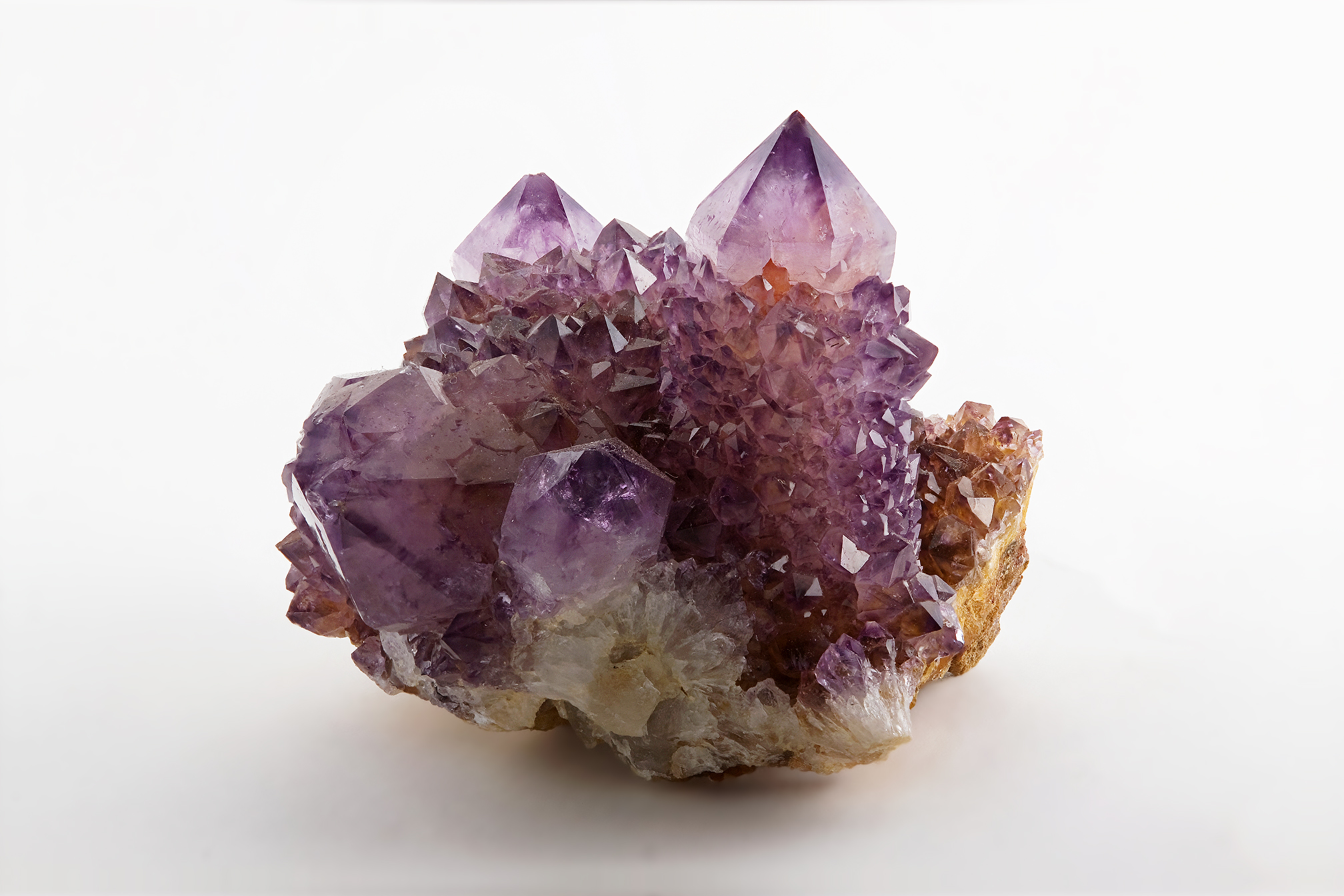
- Mineral: Amethyst

Morogoro Region (Mkoa wa Morogoro in Swahili) is one of Tanzania's 31 administrative regions. It covers an area of 70,624 km^{2} (27,268 sq mi). and is comparable in size to the combined land area of the nation state of Ireland. Morogoro Region is bordered to the north by the Manyara Region and Tanga Region, to the east by the Pwani and Lindi Regions, to the south by the Ruvuma Region and to the west by the Iringa Njombe and Dodoma Regions. The regional capital is the municipality of Morogoro. According to the 2022 national census, the region had a population of 3,197,104.

== Geography ==
The area is found in the Mid-Eastern portion of mainland Tanzania and is situated between latitudes 5° 58' and 10' south of the equator and between longitudes 35° 25' and 38° 30' east Greenwich. 4,623,005 acres, or 4.9% of the area of Tanzania's Mainland, is the size of the Morogoro region (94,278,400 ha). The majority of the total land area, 1,772,597 ha (38.3%), is made up of arable land used for crop cultivation. This is followed by pasture land, which took up 371,537 ha (8.0%), and forest land, which made up 330,277 ha (7.1%) of the region's total area. Water bodies cover the remaining 2,140,625 ha (46.3 percent of the total land), which is also where settlements are located. Seven additional Regions encircle it. The regions of Morogoro and Tanga and Manyara share a border to the north. It borders the Ruvuma and Lindi regions to the east and southeast, respectively. It borders the Dodoma, Njombe and Iringa regions to the west and southwest, respectively.

The Morogoro region has a total size of 73,039 square kilometers, which is split between land (70,967 square kilometers, or 97.2 percent of the total area), and water (2,073 km^{2} or 2.8 percent). As of 2012, Ulanga District is the largest district,Malinyi DC comes in second with 17.0 percent of the region's total land area, followed by Morogoro DC with 16.1 percent. Kilosa District comes in first with 18.6 percent. Morogoro Municipal was the district with the smallest land size (531 km^{2} or 10.7%), followed by Gairo DC with (1,851 km^{2} or 2.5 percent). Different scenarios exist in Kilosa DC, Malinyi DC, Ifakara TC, Ulanga DC, Morogoro MC, and Gairo DC, with all of their respective territories being completely covered by land. While Mvomero DC (1,882 km^{2}) has the most water area in the area. At Mlimba DC, there is the smallest water area (70 km^{2}). According to topographical and ecological zones, the region's soils differ.

The predominant type of soils in mountainous and hilly places are oxisols, which are often poor in nitrogen and phosphorus. Alluvial soils, which are naturally fertile, are typically what define valleys and lowlands. Woodlands and grasslands frequently have sandy and clay soils. Numerous crops, including maize, paddy, beans, several cassava species, sweet and round potatoes, amaranths, vegetables, sugarcane, simsim, cocoa, cotton, cashew nuts, etc., are produced in the area due to the soil conditions.

There are 143 rivers inside and traversing the region. The Morogoro region is traversed by a number of rivers and tributaries that come from the mountains. Many rivers that flow from hills to lowlands in the valleys make up the region's drainage system. Kilombero, Great Ruaha, Wami, Luwegu, Ruvu, Ngerengere, Mkata, Mkondoa, and Mkindo are a few of the important rivers.

=== Climate ===
The Morogoro Region has a tropical savannah climate with regular rainfall. In lowlands, the annual average temperature ranges from 18 °C to 30 °C. Nearly the entire year, the Region receives moderate temperatures of about 25 °C. Typically, the cooler season lasts from July to September. The Region typically experiences a bi-modal rainfall pattern, with long rains from March to May and short rains from November to January. The yearly rainfall ranges from 600 to 1800 millimeters.

While the leeward sides of the Uluguru Mountains often remain dry with yearly rainfall of less than 600mm, the eastern parts of the mountains receive extremely high rainfall of up to 2,850mm. The Gairo and Mamboya divisions in the North of Kilosa District and the Ngerengere division in the Morogoro District are those that receive the least rainfall. The Mahenge and Udzungwa mountain ranges, which are high in elevation and include substantial forest reserves, also have a significant impact on the region's climate, particularly in the southern Ulanga and Kilombero Districts.

== Economy ==
Agriculture and related industries make up the bulk of the region's economy. The main pursuits are small-scale agriculture (production of food and cash crops for sustenance), cattle raising (mostly with indigenous livestock), and plantations and estates (sisal, sugar). The modest, capital-intensive urban sector is expanding, though, and its primary activities include manufacturing and providing services like offices, hotels, petty trade, and traditional fishing, which is done along the Kilombero and Wami rivers as well as the Mindu Dam.

Lukande Village in the Ulanga District and Matombo in the Morogoro Rural District both have some mining activity. Three different mineral categories, including gemstones, building materials (such as sand, gravel, and stones), and industrial minerals (such as limestone, mica, and graphite) are found and mined within the region. The region's main economic sector is agriculture, employing about 80% - 90% of the workforce.

The sisal estates, vast rice farms, and sugar estates in Dakawa in Morogoro Rural District, Mngeta in Mlimba District, and Kilangali in Kilosa District are examples of large industrial and commercial plantation farms. The two main crops for staple foods are maize and paddy. Sorghum, sweet potatoes, beans, cassava, millet, groundnuts, tomatoes, fruits, and vegetables are some of the other food crops grown in the area. Cotton, coffee, sisal, onions, oil seeds (such simsim and sunflower), and some cocoa along the mountain slopes are the main economic crops in the region.

=== Agriculture ===
The Region's main economic sector is agriculture with about 80–90% of the labor force getting employment from this. Farmers of different sizes participate in agriculture. Morogoro Region is also Tanzanian's cocoa capital, with 20% of the farmers there growing cocoa. Over 70,000 thousand tons of cocoa beans are produced in Tanzania with the majority coming from Morogoro Region and a vast majority of it grown organically.

The sisal estates, vast paddy farms, and sugar estates in Dakawa, Morogoro Rural District, Mngeta, Mlimba District, and Kilangali, Kilosa District are examples of large farms. The two main crops for staple foods are maize and paddy. Sorghum, sweet potatoes, beans, cassava, millet, groundnuts, tomatoes, fruits, and vegetables are some of the other food crops grown in the area. Cotton, coffee, sisal, onions, oil seeds (such simsim and sunflower), and some cocoa along the mountain slopes are the main economic crops in the region.

Statistics on employment by industry show how important various economic activities are in terms of employment. More than half (76 percent) of all jobs in the Morogoro Region will be in the education sector between 2016 and 2020. Agriculture and livestock are second with 4.7 percent of employment, followed by the health sector with 13.2 percent. With only 0.8% of all employees in the region throughout the time period, natural resources had the lowest percentage of government workers.

=== Industry ===
More than 19 medium-scale companies and well over 100 small-scale industries operated in the Morogoro region between 1988 and 1990. In total, these businesses employed almost 15,000 people. Due to cash flow issues, bad management, and a lack of markets for finished goods, several of these sectors have shut down or are on the verge of doing so since the early 1990s.

As a result, 12,000 workers are thought to have lost their jobs. These industries include weaving, the processing of fibers, metal fabrication, ceramics, the processing of oils, milling, the manufacture of carts, the processing of fruits and vegetables, and many more. Some major industrial companies were, The Morogoro 81 Tobacco Factory, Morogoro Tanneries Ltd., Morogoro Shoes, and MOPROCO. Others were the Mang'ula MMMT, the Canvas Mill, Polytex, Gunny Bag, Ceramic, and the Kilosa Carpets Industries.

The region's medium-sized industries support the local economy and create employment opportunities. There were 206 different medium-scale industries in the Morogoro region as of 2020. These include the production of furniture, processing of fruits and vegetables, processing of wood, and processing of water. Morogoro Region had 31 large-scale industries in 2020. The manufacturing of grain mill goods accounted for the largest share of these industries (7; 22.6%), followed by the production of fiber (3; 9.7%), sugar processing (6.5%), and rice processing (6.5%).

=== Infrastructure ===
In 2020, the Morogoro Region's road network was around 7,561.5 kilometers long. The total length of the road network is made up of feeder roads (3,200.5 kilometers), district/urban roads (2,289.7 kilometers), regional roads (1,221.8 kilometers), and 849.4 kilometers of trunk roads (11.2 percent) (42.3 percent). Regarding councils, Mvomero DC had the greatest road network (1,302; 17.2% of all road networks), Kilosa DC had the second-largest (1,402.6; 18.5%), and Ulanga DC had the smallest (455.4%) (5.9 percent). Based on the rainy season, Only 72.4% of the roads in Morogoro Region are open for travel all year.

Of the Morogoro Region's 7,561.5 kilometers of road network, 2,071.3 kilometers (27.4 percent) are passable all year long, 3,406.4 kilometers (45.0 percent) are passable for the majority of the year, and approximately 2,083.8 kilometers (27.6 percent) are not passable for the majority of the year. At the district level, Morogoro MC had the highest percentage of passable roads (98.7%), followed by Mvomero DC (88.4%), and Ifakara TC with 79.6% during the course of the year. Of the 7,561.5 kilometers of roads in the Morogoro Region, 617.1 kilometers (8.2 percent) are paved, 889.0 kilometers (11.8 percent) are made of gravel, and the other 3,897 kilometers (51.5 percent) are made of dirt. 20% of the network is made up of tarmac and gravel roads. A railway line connecting the Morogoro Region to the Mwanza and Kigoma regions is mostly used for the movement of people and goods. The Morogoro railway station alone was able to transport 7,435 passengers and up to 83,680 tons of goods in 2019.

=== Communications ===
According to data, 96.4% of residents in the area are connected to the REA or grid for electricity, and very few use any other sources. Morogoro Region had 4 landlines at the end of 2020, 74 television stations, and 160 radio stations, 159 of which were in Morogoro MC and one in Ulanga DC. Additionally, there were 6 internet centers in the area. Additionally, there were 6 mobile phone communication service providers, and their average coverage was 65.9%. Three sub-post offices and one Post office were also present.

=== Gross domestic product ===
At 2020 exchange rates, the Morogoro region's gross domestic product (GDP) in 2015 was 4,467 billion Tanzanian Shillings (TZS), or roughly 1,942 million US dollars. At current exchange rates, the region's gross domestic product (GDP) reached 6,779 billion TZS in 2019. Agriculture generated 67.7 percent of this total, followed by the services sector (17.2 percent), the industry sector (15.1%), and the construction sector.

For the years 2015, 2016, 2017, 2018, and 2019, the Morogoro area, like other regions in Tanzania's mainland, calculated its GDP and per capita GDP, which came to 4,467,066 (in 2015), 5,036,705 (in 2016), 5,497,696 (in 2017), 6,100,388 (in 2018), and 6,779,524 (in 2019) million TZS, respectively. The Morogoro Region's computed GDP estimates by council for the years 2015 to 2019 . In 2015, Morogoro MC contributed roughly 19.9% of the region's GDP and was the leading district in the area, followed by Kilosa DC and Ulanga DC with respective contributions of 17.7 and 16.9%. Morogoro DC contributed very little to the region's GDP during that time, only 2.2%.

Kilosa DC contributed a higher share of the regional GDP from 2016 to 2019, with 19.4% in 2016, 19.3 in 2017, 20 in 2018, and 21.3 in 2019. Morogoro MC came in second place with virtually the same percentages (18.8% in 2016 and 17.4% in 2019). Morogoro DC made the least contribution to regional GDP over the five-year period. When examining the regional economy's distribution, Ulanga DC, Ifakara TC, and Morogoro Municipal came in first and second place, respectively, for each of the five years. Morogoro DC and Gairo DC, which were placed 8 and 9 respectively, had the lowest per capita GDP. Based on the average per-capita national GDP, it was noted that the Morogoro Region had low per-capita GDP during the time, below the national average (2015 -2019). Nevertheless, over the course of the time, certain district councils had high per capita GDP levels above the national average. These districts were Ifakara TC, Morogoro MC, and Ulanga DC.

=== Wildlife and reserves ===
A total of 4,190,663 ha of land make up the Morogoro Region, of which 330,277 ha, or 7.9 percent, are covered in forest. Additionally, the data reveals that 99.4% of the forest cover is made up of natural forest reserves, while 0.6% is made up of forest plantations. With 3.1% of the region's land area covered in forests, Mvomero DC has the highest proportion, followed by Morogoro DC (3.0 percent). National Parks in the region are Mikumi National Park, Udzungwa Mountains National Park and Nyerere National Park. Game and nature reserves include, Liganga Forest Reserve, Uluguru and Mkingu Forest Reserves.

== Population ==
The Morogoro Region is the ancestral homeland to the following people groups: Luguru, Ngulu, kutu, Sagara, Vidunda, Kaguru, Mbunga, Ndamba, Pogoro and Ngindo.

According to the 2012 Population and Housing Census, there were roughly 2.2 million people living in the Morogoro region in 2012. Out of that, 28.7 percent (or 0.6 million) lived in urban areas, with 71.3 percent (or 1.5 million) living in rural areas. Additionally, according to census data and projections for 2020, the Morogoro region's population grew at a 3.0 percent annual pace from 2012 to 2020. While the population growth rate in urban regions was 2.9 percent, it was just 2.1 percent in rural areas.

At the district level, Kilosa DC is the most populous council in the area with a population of 438,175 individuals in 2012 and 538,755 individuals (population projections for 2020). Morogoro MC is the next most populous council, with a population of 315,866 individuals in 2012 and 394,528 individuals (population projections for 2020). Malinyi DC and Ulanga DC each had 114,202 and 151,001 people as their respective population minimums in 2012. According to population forecasts for 2020, they will have 142,753 and 188,751 inhabitants respectively.

Between 2012 and 2020, the Morogoro region's population changed by 23.7 percent overall. At the district level, Morogoro MC (24.9 percent), Mvomero DC, and Kilosa DC had the biggest population changes, with a combined change of 31.8 percent (22.3 percent). Population change in the town (Morogoro Municipal) is caused by a significant influx of people moving there for work and other official purposes, whereas in the Kilosa and Mvomero districts, it is caused by the immigrant Sukuma cattle herders seeking grazing land and agricultural opportunities. Malinyi DC saw the smallest population growth, at around 9.0 percent. In the Morogoro region, there were 48 people per square kilometer in 2012 and 59 people per square kilometer in 2020.

With 743 people per square kilometer in 2020, Morogoro Municipal Council will have the highest population density in the area. This number grew from 594 per square kilometer in 2012. With a population density of 239 people per km^{2} in 2020, up from 129 people per km^{2} in 2012, Ifakara TC is the second most densely inhabited council in the area. With a population density of 130 people per km^{2} in 2020, up from 104 people per km^{2} in 2012, Gairo 11 DC is the third most densely inhabited council in the area. Malinyi DC had the lowest population density, with only 11 people per square kilometer in 2012 and 14 in 2020.

Census	Population
1978	939,264
1988	1,220,564
2002	1,753,362
2012	2,218,492
2022	3,197,104

== Administrative divisions ==
As of 2020, Morogoro Region is divided administratively into 9 district councils: Kilosa DC, Ulanga DC, Morogoro DC, Morogoro MC, Mvomero DC, Gairo DC, Ifakara TC, Malinyi DC, and Mlimba DC. 32 divisions, 214 wards, 669 villages, 365 Mitaa, and 3,389 hamlets make up the region. There are 11 election districts in the region.

=== Districts ===
Morogoro Region is divided into seven districts, each administered by a council as of 2022:

Districts of Morogoro Region
Map	District	Population (2012)	Population (2022)
	Gairo District	193,011	258,205
	Ifakara Township	N/A	290,424
	Kilombero District	407,880	617,032
	Kilosa District	438,175	225,126
	Malinyi District	114,202	292,536
	Morogoro Rural District	286,248	471,409
	Morogoro Municipal	315,866	387,736
	Mvomero District	312,109	421,741
	Ulanga District	151,001	232,895
Total		2,218,492	3,197,104

=== Constituencies ===
For parliamentary elections, Tanzania is divided into constituencies. As of the 2010 elections Morogoro Region had ten constituencies:

- Gairo Constituency
- Kilombero Constituency
- Kilosa Constituency
- Mikumi Constituency
- Morogoro-Kusini-Mashariki Constituency
- Morogoro Kusini Constituency
- Morogoro Mjini Constituency
- Mvomero Constituency
- Ulanga Magharibi Constituency
- Ulanga Mashariki Constituency

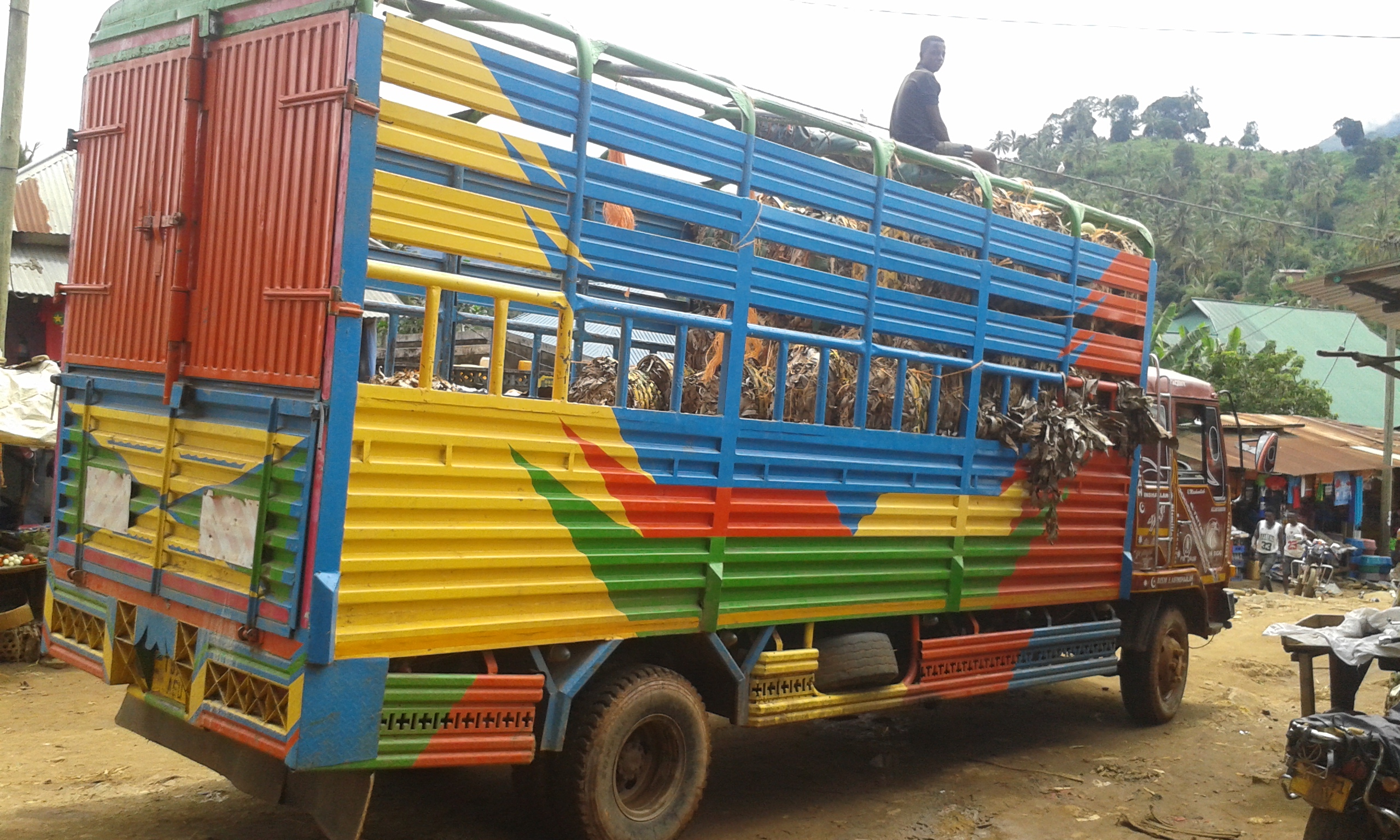
A truck in a village near Morogoro.

== Health and education ==
A total of 381 dispensaries were located in the Morogoro Region, with 277 of them being public and 104 being private. In 2020, Malinyi DC had the fewest dispensaries (15), while Morogoro DC had the most health centers (71) followed by Kilosa DC (67). In addition, there were 53 health facilities in the area, of which 18 were private and 35 were public. The council had 18 hospitals in total, of which 9 were public and 9 were private. The most dispensaries were found in Mlimba DC (19), followed by Ulanga DC (18) and Morogoro DC (15). According to data from the municipalities, the area will not have any new hospitals or health facilities between 2017 and 2020. The region has two referral hospitals, St Francis Referral Hospital (Ifakara) and the Morogoro Referral Hospital (Morogoro) with an eye care department.

The Morogoro Region has a number of universities, including the Sokoine University of Agriculture, Jordan University College, Morogoro Muslim University, and Mzumbe University. There are also colleges such as Morogoro Teachers' College, Dakawa Teachers' College, and Land College. In 2017, there were 872 pre-primary classrooms in Morogoro Region, 823 (94.4%) of which belonged to the public, and 49 (5.6%) to private owners. Pre-primary school enrollment climbed to 833 in 2019 (a 1.2% rise), of which 822 (93.2%) were public schools and 61 (6.8%) were private (Table 5.16). At the council's level, Morogoro DC had the most pre-primary schools in 2019 with 159 (157 public and 2 private), followed by Kilosa DC with 154 (148 public and 6 private), Mvomero 104 DC with 144 (143 public and 3 private), and Malinyi DC with 35 (35 public and no private).

There were 58 private secondary schools and 180 public ones in the area in 2016. In 2019, there were 64 private and 182 public schools, an increase. Relatively speaking, Malinyi DC has the fewest secondary schools overall in 2019 (39 public and 4 private), followed by Morogoro DC (27 public and 2 private), and Kilosa DC (39 public and 4 private). There were just 10 libraries in the area in 2020. Additionally, the region needed 162 libraries, leaving a shortage of 152.0 (93.8 percent). Except for Kilosa DC, which has six libraries in public secondary schools in 2020, followed by Ulanga DC with three, and Mvomero DC with one, the majority of the councils in the region lack such facilities.

== Notable people from Morogoro Region ==
- Penina Muhando, writer
- Amandina Lihamba, actress and writer
- Rose Mhando, musician
