= Ikungi District =

- District
- Ikungi District's location within Singida Region.
- Coordinates: 05°08′S 34°46′E
- Country: Tanzania
- Region: Singida Region

Area
  - Total: 8,860 km^{2} (3,420 sq mi)

Population (2022)
  - Total: 411,262
  - Density: 46.4/km^{2} (120/sq mi)

Ikungi District is one of the six districts of the Singida Region of Tanzania. It is one of the 20 new districts that were formed in Tanzania since 2010; it was split off from Singida Rural District. Ikungi District is bordered to the north by Iramba District, Singida Urban District and Singida Rural District, to the east by Manyara Region, to the south by Manyoni District and to the west by Tabora Region. Its administrative seat is the town of Ikungi.

According to the 2022 Tanzania National Census, the population of Ikungi District was 411,262.

== Transport ==
Paved trunk road T3 from Morogoro to the Rwandan border passes through the district.

The Singida branch of the Central Railway of Tanzanian Railways passes through the district. There is a station at Ikungi town.

== Administrative subdivisions ==
As of 2012, Ikungi District was administratively divided into 26 wards.

== Wards 2012 ==
Ward	Population	Population - Male	Population - Female	Number of Households	Average Household Size
Puma	9,945	4,795	5,150	1,999	5
Kituntu	8,444	4,219	4,225	1,497	5.6
Mungaa	18,276	8,903	9,373	3,554	5.1
Siuyu	7,952	3,987	3,965	1,472	5.4
Kikio	7,887	3,937	3,950	1,515	5.2
Lighwa	7,245	3,575	3,670	1,349	5.4
Misughaa	6,679	3,376	3,303	1,302	5.1
Ntuntu	11,360	5,738	5,622	2,124	5.3
Dung'unyi	10,158	5,111	5,047	1,994	5.1
Mang'onyi	14,962	7,903	7,059	3,053	4.9
Mkiwa	5,152	2,625	2,527	942	5.5
Issuna	12,158	6,212	5,946	2,195	5.5
Unyahati	9,710	4,870	4,840	1,956	5
Ikungi	12,661	6,331	6,330	2,533	5
Iglansoni	11,256	5,432	5,824	1,595	7.1
Iseke	6,933	3,444	3,489	1,346	5.2
Ihanja	8,269	4,169	4,100	1,620	5.1
Minyughe	18,440	9,239	9,201	4,965	3.7
Muhintiri	8,896	4,420	4,476	1,486	6
Iyumbu	9,377	4,590	4,787	1,133	8.3
Mgungira	6,548	3,198	3,350	913	7.2
Mwaru	11,784	5,752	6,032	1,929	6.1
Ighombwe	13,344	6,692	6,652	1,839	7.3
Mtunduru	17,056	8,589	8,467	2,940	5.8
Sepuka	12,446	6,092	6,354	2,352	5.3
Irisya	6,021	2,979	3,042	1,097	5.5

== Wards 2002 ==
The Singida Rural District was administratively divided into 30 wards:

- Dungunyi
- Kinyeto
- Iambi
- Ihanja
- Ikhanoda
- Ikungi
- Ilongero
- Irisya
- Issuna
- Maghojoa
- Makuro
- Mangonyi
- Matumbo
- Merya
- Mgori
- Mgungira
- Minyughe
- Misughaa
- Msisi
- Mtinko
- Mudida
- Muhintiri
- Mungaa
- Mwaru
- Ngimu
- Ntuntu
- Puma
- Sepuka
- Siuyu
- Ughandi

== Sources ==
- Singida Rural District Homepage for the 2002 Tanzania National Census
