= Singida (disambiguation) =

Singida may refer to:

- Singida, a town in Tanzania
- Singida Rural and Singida Urban, two districts in Tanzania, headquartered at Singida.
- Singida Region, a region of Tanzania, headquartered at Singida.
- Singida (fish), an extinct genus
