= Mtinko =

Coordinates: 4°33′S 34°51′E

Mtinko is an administrative ward in the Singida Rural district of the Singida Region of Tanzania. According to the 2002 census, the ward has a total population of 25,327.

Mtinko itself is a small town probably 4000 population. Mtinko ward comprises several villages. The villages are: Kijota, Ikiwu, Minyenye, Mpambaa, Malolo, Matumbo, Mpipiti and Mudida.

== Language ==
Swahili is the national language and 95% of the residents can speak Swahili. The main spoken language is Nyaturu. 90% of Mtinko people speak Nyaturu of the Ki-rwana dialect. This dialect is spoken by Northern Singida people. the Southern people speak Nyaturu of Ki-ahi dialect. They have no problem of understanding each other. The 10% are immigrants from Southern Singida, Iramba and other parts of the country.

== Economy ==
Most of the people here are farmers. A few percentages work as teachers, agriculture officers or on health services.

Corn, millet, sunflower, beans, peanuts, cassava, onions and cotton. Sunflower is the main source of income. Mtinko villagers raise cattle, goats, sheep and chickens. The staple food for Singida people is Ugali. This is like mashed potatoes but it is prepared by corn flour.

There is undergoing exploration of small scale gold miners around Mpambaa, Mpipiti and Mudida villages. Also there are ongoing mining activities (artisanal) at Mipipiti village(Makikiwe/Congo suburbs) and Mpambaa village.

There are just small scale industries such as corn flour and sunflower oil mills.

== Health ==
Modern health centre is located in the town of Mtinko. Most of the nearby villagers come here for treatment. See https://maps.google.com for St.Carolus Hospital in Mtinko.

== Climate ==
There are two seasons; rain and dry seasons. Rain season is between November and May. Dry Season is between June and October although occasionally October and May it can rain. During dry season the night and morning are cold and wind sometimes. There are other small health centers at Mudida village and Ghalunyangu village.
