= Nyaturu =

Nyaturu may refer to:

- the Nyaturu people
- the Nyaturu language
