= Singida Wind Power Station =

Wind farm in Tanzania

- Location of Singida Wind Power Station
- Country: Tanzania
- Location: Singida, Singida Region
- Coordinates: 04°53′58″S 34°47′22″E
- Status: Under construction
- Commission date: 2017(Expected)
- Owner: Wind East Africa Limited

Thermal power station
- Primary fuel: Wind power

Power generation
- Nameplate capacity: 100 MW (130,000 hp)

Singida Wind Power Station, also Singida Wind Farm, is a potential 100 MW (130,000 hp) wind-powered electricity power station, under construction in Tanzania.

== Location ==
The power station is located approximately 10 kilometres (6 mi), by road, south-east of Singida, the capital and largest city in the Singida Region of central Tanzania, about equidistant between Singida and Puma. This about 690 kilometres (429 mi), by road, west of Dar es Salaam, the commercial capital of Tanzania. The coordinates of the power station are 04°53'58.0"S, 34°47'22.0"E (Latitude:-4.899450; Longitude:34.789432).

== Overview ==
The power station is privately owned by Wind East Africa Limited. The power generated is projected at 100 megawatts and will be sold to the Tanzanian power company Tanesco for integration into the national power grid. The station construction cost is budgeted at US$285 million, and the station is expected to be ready in December 2017.

== Ownership ==
The power station is owned by a consortium that consists of Six Telecoms, a Tanzanian company, Aldwych International Limited of the United Kingdom, and the International Finance Corporation, based in Washington, D. C. Wind East Africa Limited is the special purpose vehicle formed by the consortium to develop, own, and operate the power station.

== See also ==
- List of power stations in Tanzania
