= Sepuka =

Coordinates: 4°45′S 34°32′E

Sepuka is an administrative ward in the Singida Rural district of the Singida Region of Tanzania. According to the 2002 census, the ward has a total population of 24,315.
