= Dungunyi =

Coordinates: 5°05′S 34°48′E

Dungunyi is an administrative ward in the Singida Rural district of the Singida Region of Tanzania. According to the 2002 census, the ward has a total population of 10,747.
