= Mandewa =

Ward in Tanzania

Mandewa Kata ya Mandewa
- Ward
- Location within Tanzania
- Coordinates: 4.79751338°S 34.7106869°E
- Country: Tanzania
- Region: Singida Region
- District: Singida Urban
- Ward: Mandewa

Population (2016)
  - Total: 19,676
- Time zone: UTC+3 (EAT)

Mandewa is an administrative ward in the Singida Urban district of the Singida Region of Tanzania. In 2016 the Tanzania National Bureau of Statistics report there were 19,676 people in the ward, from 17,932 in 2012.
