= Irisya =

Administrative ward in Singida, Tanzania

Coordinates: 4°40′S 34°36′E

Irisya is an administrative ward in the Singida Rural district of the Singida Region of Tanzania. According to the 2002 census, the ward has a total population of 4,905.
