= Kinyeto =

Ward in Singida, Tanzania

Kinyeto Kata ya Kinyeto
- Ward
- Location within Tanzania
- Coordinates: 4.7614408°S 34.844829°E
- Country: Tanzania
- Region: Singida Region
- District: Singida Rural
- Ward: Kinyeto

Population (2016)
  - Total: 9,936
- Time zone: UTC+3 (EAT)

Kinyeto is an administrative ward in the Singida Rural district of the Singida Region of Tanzania. In 2016 the Tanzania National Bureau of Statistics reported there were 9,936 people in the ward, up from 9,055 in 2012.
