= Misughaa =

Coordinates: 5°03′S 35°02′E

Misughaa is an administrative ward in the Singida Rural district of the Singida Region of Tanzania. According to the 2002 census, the ward has a total population of 8,505.
