= Mughanga =

Ward in Singida, Tanzania

Mughanga Kata ya Mughanga
- Ward
- Location within Tanzania
- Coordinates: 4.8134003°S 34.7490094°E
- Country: Tanzania
- Region: Singida Region
- District: Singida Urban
- Ward: Mughanga

Population (2016)
  - Total: 2,245
- Time zone: UTC+3 (EAT)

Mughanga is an administrative ward in the Singida Urban district of the Singida Region of Tanzania. In 2016 the Tanzania National Bureau of Statistics report there were 2,245 people in the ward, from 2,046 in 2012.
