= Unyamikumbi =

Ward in Singida, Tanzania

Unyamikumbi Kata ya Unyamikumbi
- Ward
- Location within Tanzania
- Coordinates: 4.910°S 34.793°E
- Country: Tanzania
- Region: Singida Region
- District: Singida Urban
- Ward: Unyamikumbi

Population (2016)
  - Total: 6,115
- Time zone: UTC+3 (EAT)

Unyamikumbi is an administrative ward in the Singida Urban district of the Singida Region of Tanzania. In 2016 the Tanzania National Bureau of Statistics report there were 6,115 people in the ward, from 12,616 in 2012.
