= Mgandu =

Ward in Singida, Tanzania

Mgandu Kata ya Mgandu
- Ward
- Location within Tanzania
- Country: Tanzania
- Region: Singida Region
- District: Manyoni District
- Ward: Mgandu

Population (2016)
  - Total: 15,129
- Time zone: UTC+3 (EAT)

Mgandu is an administrative ward in the Manyoni District of the Singida Region of Tanzania. In 2016 the Tanzania National Bureau of Statistics report there were 15,129 people in the ward, from 13,788 in 2012.
