= Ihanja =

Administrative ward in Singida Region, Tanzania

Coordinates: 5°04′S 34°40′E

Ihanja is an administrative ward in the Singida Rural district of the Singida Region of Tanzania. According to the 2002 census, the ward has a total population of 13,590.
