= Mangonyi =

Administrative ward in Tanzania

Coordinates: 5°14′S 34°55′E

Mangonyi is an administrative ward in the Singida Rural district of the Singida Region of Tanzania. According to the 2002 census, the ward has a total population of 10,246.
