= Mtamaa =

Tanzanian administrative ward

Coordinates: 4°56′S 34°38′E

Mtamaa is an administrative ward in the Singida Urban district of the Singida Region of Tanzania. According to the 2002 census, the ward has a total population of 6,250.
