= Sanjaranda =

Ward in Manyoni, Singida, Tanzania

Sanjaranda Kata ya Sanjaranda
- Ward
- Location within Tanzania
- Country: Tanzania
- Region: Singida Region
- District: Manyoni District
- Ward: Sanjaranda

Population (2016)
  - Total: 9,687
- Time zone: UTC+3 (EAT)

Sanjaranda is an administrative ward in the Manyoni District of the Singida Region of Tanzania. In 2016 the Tanzania National Bureau of Statistics report there were 9,687 people in the ward, from 8,828 in 2012.
