= Ngimu =

Coordinates: 4°45′0″S 35°5′0″E

Ngimu is an administrative ward in the Singida Rural district of the Singida Region of Tanzania. According to the 2002 census, the ward has a total population of 14,974.
