= Ilongero =

Coordinates: 4°40′S 34°52′E

Ilongero is an administrative ward in the Singida Rural district of the Singida Region of Tanzania. According to the 2002 census, the ward has a total population of 16,435.
