= Mitunduruni =

Coordinates: 4°48′S 34°46′E

Mitunduruni is an administrative ward in the Singida Urban district of the Singida Region of Tanzania. According to the 2002 census, the ward has a total population of 8,905.
