= Msisi (Singida Rural ward) =

Ward in Singida, Tanzania

Msisi Kata ya Msisi
- Ward
- Location within Tanzania
- Coordinates: 4.6405757°S 34.6573312°E
- Country: Tanzania
- Region: Singida Region
- District: Singida Rural
- Ward: Msisi

Population (2016)
  - Total: 10,220
- Time zone: UTC+3 (EAT)

Msisi is an administrative ward in the Singida Rural district of the Singida Region of Tanzania. In 2016 the Tanzania National Bureau of Statistics report there were 10,220 people in the ward, from 9,314 in 2012.
