= Ughandi =

Ward in Singida, Tanzania

Ughandi Kata ya Ughandi
- Ward
- Location within Tanzania
- Coordinates: 4.5876615°S 34.7122619°E
- Country: Tanzania
- Region: Singida Region
- District: Singida Rural
- Ward: Ughandi

Population (2016)
  - Total: 17,540
- Time zone: UTC+3 (EAT)

Ughandi is an administrative ward in the Singida Rural District of the Singida Region of Tanzania. The ward lies just outside and to the south-east of the town of Iguguno.

In 2016 the Tanzania National Bureau of Statistics report there were 17,540 people in the ward, from 15,985 in 2012.
