= Ikhanoda =

Ward in Singida, Tanzania

Ikhanoda Kata ya Ikhanoda
- Ward
- Location within Tanzania
- Coordinates: 4.5929292°S 34.948501°E
- Country: Tanzania
- Region: Singida Region
- District: Singida Rural
- Ward: Ikhanoda

Population (2016)
  - Total: 11,968
- Time zone: UTC+3 (EAT)

Ikhanoda is an administrative ward in the Singida Rural district of the Singida Region of Tanzania. In 2016 the Tanzania National Bureau of Statistics report there were 11,968 people in the ward, from 10,907 in 2012.
