= Mungumaji =

Ward in Singida, Tanzania

Mungumaji Kata ya Mungumaji
- Ward
- Location within Tanzania
- Coordinates: 4.8298°S 34.7804°E
- Country: Tanzania
- Region: Singida Region
- District: Singida Urban
- Ward: Mungumaji

Population (2016)
  - Total: 4,740
- Time zone: UTC+3 (EAT)

Mungumaji is an administrative ward in the Singida Urban district of the Singida Region of Tanzania. In 2016, the Tanzania National Bureau of Statistics reported there were 4,740 people in the ward, from 4,320 in 2012.
