= Majengo, Singida =

Ward in Singida, Tanzania

Majengo Kata ya Majengo
- Ward
- Location within Tanzania
- Coordinates: 4.8232197°S 34.7547085°E
- Country: Tanzania
- Region: Singida Region
- District: Singida Urban
- Ward: Majengo

Population (2016)
  - Total: 10,282
- Time zone: UTC+3 (EAT)

Majengo is an administrative ward in the Singida Urban district of the Singida Region of Tanzania. In 2016 the Tanzania National Bureau of Statistics report there were 10,282 people in the ward, from 9,370 in 2012.
