= Mtipa =

Administrative division of Tanzania

Coordinates: 4°46′S 34°45′E

Mtipa is an administrative ward in the Singida Urban district of the Singida Region of Tanzania. According to the 2002 census, the ward has a total population of 6,510.
