= Sanza =

Sanza may refer to:

== People ==
- Nick Sanza, Canadian retired ice hockey goaltender
- Nicola Di Sanza (born 1990), Italian football player

== Places ==
- Sanza (Tanzanian ward), Tanzania
- Sanza, Campania, Italy
- Sanza Pombo, Angola

== Other ==
- Sanza, also known as mbira, African musical instrument
- Sanza, a word and concept used in Zande literature, esp. proverbs
