= Manyoni District =

- District
- Manyoni District's location within Singida Region
- Coordinates: 05°45′S 34°50′E
- Country: Tanzania
- Region: Singida Region

Area
  - Total: 9,393 km^{2} (3,627 sq mi)

Population (2022)
  - Total: 279,069
  - Density: 29.71/km^{2} (76.95/sq mi)

Manyoni District is one of the six districts in the Singida Region of Tanzania. The district capital is the town of Manyoni. The district is bordered to the north by the Ikungi District, to the east by the Dodoma Region, to the south by the Iringa Region, to the southwest by the Mbeya Region and to the west by the Itigi District. In 2015 the Itigi District was created from the Manyoni District, separating the Itigi Division that was the large portion of the south western of the district.

According to the 2022 Tanzania National Census, the population of the Manyoni District was 279,069.

As of 2016 the district commissioner of the Manyoni district was Rahabu Mwagisa Solomon.

== Transport ==
Paved trunk road T3 from Morogoro to the Rwanda border passes through the district.

The town of Manyoni has a station on the Central Railway of the Tanzanian Railways.

== Administrative subdivisions ==
As of 2012, Manyoni District was administratively divided into 30 wards.

=== Wards ===
- Aghondi
- Chikola
- Chikuyu
- Heka
- Idodyandole
- Ipande
- Isseke
- Itigi Majengo
- Itigi Mjini
- Kintinku
- Kitaraka
- Majiri
- Makanda
- Makuru
- Makutupora
- Manyoni
- Mgandu
- Mitundu
- Mkwese
- Muhalala
- Mvumi
- Mwamagembe
- Nkonko
- Rungwa
- Sanjaranda
- Sanza
- Saranda
- Sasajila
- Sasilo
- Solya

== See also ==
- Railway stations in Tanzania

== Sources ==
- Manyoni District Homepage for the 2002 Tanzania National Census
- Tanzanian Government Directory Database
