= Mgungira =

Ward in Ikungi, Singida, Tanzania

Mgungira Kata ya Mgungira
- Ward
- Location within Tanzania
- Coordinates: 4.96556518°S 34.01892°E
- Country: Tanzania
- Region: Singida Region
- District: Ikungi District
- Ward: Mgungira

Population (2016)
  - Total: 7,185
- Time zone: UTC+3 (EAT)

Mgungira is an administrative ward in the Ikungi District of the Singida Region of Tanzania. In 2016 the Tanzania National Bureau of Statistics report there were 7,185 people in the ward, from 6,548 in 2012.
