= Minyughe =

Ward in Ikungi, Singida, Tanzania

Minyughe Kata ya Minyughe
- Ward
- Location within Tanzania
- Coordinates: 5.0489751°S 34.4526976°E
- Country: Tanzania
- Region: Singida Region
- District: Ikungi District
- Ward: Minyughe

Population (2016)
  - Total: 7,163
- Time zone: UTC+3 (EAT)

Minyughe is an administrative ward in the Ikungi District of the Singida Region of Tanzania. In 2016 the Tanzania National Bureau of Statistics report there were 7,163 people in the ward, from 18,440 in 2012.
