= Ipande (Manyoni ward) =

Ward in Manyoni, Singida, Tanzania

Ipande Kata ya Ipande
- Ward
- Location within Tanzania
- Coordinates: 5.868444°S 34.512970°E
- Country: Tanzania
- Region: Singida Region
- District: Manyoni district
- Ward: Ipande

Population (2016)
  - Total: 11,017
- Time zone: UTC+3 (EAT)

Ipande is an administrative ward in the Manyoni District of the Singida Region of Tanzania. In 2016 the Tanzania National Bureau of Statistics report there were 11,017 people in the ward, from 10,040 in 2012.
