= Ipembe =

Ward in Singida, Tanzania

Ipembe Kata ya Ipembe
- Ward
- Location within Tanzania
- Coordinates: 4.815764°S 34.74563°E
- Country: Tanzania
- Region: Singida Region
- District: Singida Urban
- Ward: Ipembe

Population (2016)
  - Total: 2,039
- Time zone: UTC+3 (EAT)

Ipembe is an administrative ward in the Singida Urban district of the Singida Region of Tanzania. In 2016 the Tanzania National Bureau of Statistics report there were 2,039 people in the ward, from 1,858 in 2012.
