= Nkonko =

Ward in Manyoni, Singida, Tanzania

Nkonko Kata ya Nkonko
- Ward
- Location within Tanzania
- Country: Tanzania
- Region: Singida Region
- District: Manyoni District
- Ward: Nkonko

Population (2016)
  - Total: 12,378
- Time zone: UTC+3 (EAT)

Nkonko is an administrative ward in the Manyoni District of the Singida Region of Tanzania. In 2016 the Tanzania National Bureau of Statistics report there were 12,378 people in the ward, from 11,281 in 2012.
