= Ntuntu =

Coordinates: 5°08′S 34°59′E

Ntuntu is an administrative ward in the Singida Rural district of the Singida Region of Tanzania. According to the 2002 census, the ward has a total population of 13,983.
