= Sasajila =

Ward in Manyoni, Singida, Tanzania

Sasajila Kata ya Sasajila
- Ward
- Location within Tanzania
- Coordinates: 5.9338664°S 34.949957°E
- Country: Tanzania
- Region: Singida Region
- District: Manyoni District
- Ward: Sasajila

Population (2016)
  - Total: 7,836
- Time zone: UTC+3 (EAT)

Sasajila is an administrative ward in the Manyoni District of the Singida Region of Tanzania. In 2016 the Tanzania National Bureau of Statistics report there were 7,836 people in the ward, from 7,141 in 2012.
