= Merya (Tanzanian ward) =

Coordinates: 4°42′S 34°57′E

Merya is an administrative ward in the Singida Rural district of the Singida Region of Tanzania.

It is approximately 712 km north west of Dar es Salaam, Tanzania. It is partly connected via all weather road from the capital of Tanzania. The final leg of the journey is on a mud road.

According to the 2012 census, the ward has a total population of 8,051.

Merya is known for its heavy production of onions.
