= Unyambwa =

Ward in Singida, Tanzania

Unyambwa Kata ya Unyambwa
- Ward
- Location within Tanzania
- Coordinates: 4.8035418°S 34.8176537°E
- Country: Tanzania
- Region: Singida Region
- District: Singida Urban
- Ward: Unyambwa

Population (2016)
  - Total: 10,206
- Time zone: UTC+3 (EAT)

Unyambwa is an administrative ward in the Singida Urban district of the Singida Region of Tanzania. In 2016 the Tanzania National Bureau of Statistics report there were 10,206 people in the ward, from 9,301 in 2012.
