= Mgori =

Coordinates: 4°50′S 34°59′E

Mgori is an administrative ward in the Singida Rural district of the Singida Region of Tanzania. According to the 2002 census, the ward has a total population of 10,777.
