= Makuro =

Coordinates: 9°35′S 37°26′E

Makuro is an administrative ward in the Singida Rural district of the Singida Region of Tanzania. According to the 2002 census, the ward has a total population of 15,533.
