= Mungaa =

Constituency of Tanzania

Coordinates: 4°58′S 34°53′E

Mungaa is an administrative ward in the Singida Rural district of the Singida Region of Tanzania. According to the 2002 census, the ward has a total population of 15,841.
