= Singida Urban District =

- District
- Singida Urban District's location within Singida Region.
- Coordinates: 04°49′S 34°45′E
- Country: Tanzania
- Region: Singida Region

Area
  - Total: 720.5 km^{2} (278.2 sq mi)

Population (2022 census)
  - Total: 232,459
  - Density: 322.6/km^{2} (835.6/sq mi)
- Area code: 026

Singida Urban District is one of the six districts of the Singida Region of Tanzania. It is bordered to the south and west by the Ikungi District and to the north and east by the Singida Rural District. Its administrative seat is the town of Singida.

According to the 2012 Tanzania national census, the population of the Singida Urban District was 150,379.

== Transport ==
Paved Trunk road T3 from Morogoro to the Rwandan border passes through the district. Paved trunk road T14 connects Singida with Babati in Manyara Region.

The Singida branch of the Central Line railway connects Singida with the town of Manyoni, which is on the main line.

== Administrative subdivisions ==
As of 2012, Singida Urban District was administratively divided into 16 wards.

=== Wards ===
- Ipembe
- Kindai
- Majengo
- Mandewa
- Minga
- Misuna
- Mitunduruni
- Mtamaa
- Mtipa
- Mughanga
- Mungumaji
- Mwankoko
- Unyianga
- Uhamaka
- Unyambwa
- Unyamikumbi
- Utemini
