= Utemini =

Ward in Singida, Tanzania

Utemini Kata ya Utemini
- Ward
- Location within Tanzania
- Coordinates: 4.8214°S 34.7276°E
- Country: Tanzania
- Region: Singida Region
- District: Singida Urban
- Ward: Utemini

Population (2016)
  - Total: 12,365
- Time zone: UTC+3 (EAT)

Utemini is an administrative ward in the Singida Urban district of the Singida Region of Tanzania. In 2016 the Tanzania National Bureau of Statistics report there were 12,365 people in the ward, from 11,269 in 2012.
