= Heka-Azimio =

Village in Manyoni, Singida, Tanzania

- Ward
- Location within Tanzania
- Coordinates: 6.130651°S 34.87045°E
- Country: Tanzania
- Region: Singida Region
- District: Manyoni District

Population (2016)
  - Total: 8,692
- Time zone: UTC+3 (EAT)

Heka-Azimio is a village in the administrative ward of Heka in the Manyoni District of the Singida Region of Tanzania. In 2016 the Tanzania National Bureau of Statistics report there were 8,692 people in the ward, from 7,921 in 2012.
