= Mudida =

Coordinates: 4°26′S 34°51′E

Mudida is an administrative ward in the Singida Rural district of the Singida Region of Tanzania. According to the 2002 census, the ward has a total population of 12,321.
