= Chikola (Manyoni ward) =

Ward in Manyoni, Singida, Tanzania

Chikola Kata ya Chikola
- Ward
- Location within Tanzania
- Coordinates: 6.050341°S 34.833032°E
- Country: Tanzania
- Region: Singida Region
- District: Manyoni District
- Ward: Chikola

Population (2016)
  - Total: 14,855
- Time zone: UTC+3 (EAT)

Chikola is an administrative ward in the Manyoni District of the Singida Region of Tanzania. In 2016 the Tanzania National Bureau of Statistics report there were 14,855 people in the ward, from 13,668 in 2012.
