= Makuru =

Ward in Manyoni, Singida, Tanzania

Makuru Kata ya
- Ward
- Location within Tanzania
- Country: Tanzania
- Region: Singida Region
- District: Manyoni District
- Ward: Makuru

Population (2016)
  - Total: 13,029
- Time zone: UTC+3 (EAT)

Makuru is an administrative ward in the Manyoni District of the Singida Region of Tanzania. In 2016 the Tanzania National Bureau of Statistics report there were 13,029 people in the ward, from 11,874 in 2012.
