= Idodyandole =

Ward in Manyoni, Singida, Tanzania

Idodyandole Kata ya Idodyandole
- Ward
- Location within Tanzania
- Coordinates: 5.913545°S 34.742920°E
- Country: Tanzania
- Region: Singida Region
- District: Manyoni District
- Ward: Idodyandole

Population (2016)
  - Total: 12,291
- Time zone: UTC+3 (EAT)

Idodyandole is an administrative ward in the Manyoni District of the Singida Region of Tanzania. In 2016 the Tanzania National Bureau of Statistics report there were 12,291 people in the ward, from 11,201 in 2012.
