= Isanzu language =

Bantu language spoken in Tanzania

Isanzu
- Kinyihanzu
- Native to: Tanzania
- Ethnicity: Anyihanzu
- Native speakers: 26,000 (2009)
- Language family: Niger–Congo?: Atlantic–Congo; Volta-Congo; Benue–Congo; Bantoid; Southern Bantoid; Bantu; Nyaturu-Nilamba-Isanzu; Isanzu

Language codes
- ISO 639-3: isn
- Glottolog: isan1243
- Guthrie code: F.31B
- ELP: Isanzu

Isanzu
- People: Anyihanzu
- Language: Kinyihanzu
- Country: Ihanzu

Isanzu is a Bantu language spoken by the Isanzu people south of Lake Eyasi in Tanzania.

The position of Isanzu within the Bantu family is uncertain. It is rather distinct in certain features from other Bantu languages of the area, such as Nyaturu, but is quite close in others. One easily recognizable feature is /h/ in words where neighboring languages have /s/ or /tʃ/, as in the name Isanzu ~ Ihanzu, a feature it shares with Iramba, and a reason it is commonly classified with Iramba.

== Phonology ==
Consonants
	Labial	Alveolar	Palatal	Velar	Glottal
Plosive	p b	t d		k g	
Affricate		dz	dʒ		
Fricative	f	s	ʃ	x	h
Nasal	m̥ m	n̥ n	ɲ	ŋ̊ ŋ	
Approximant	w	r, l	j		

Vowels
	Front	Central	Back
High	i iː		u uː
Mid-high	e eː		o oː
Mid-low	ɛ ɛː		ɔ ɔː
Low		a aː	

Additionally, Isanzu distinguishes between high tone and low tone.
