= Aghondi =

Ward in Manyoni District, Singida Region

Aghondi Kata ya Aghondi
- Ward
- Location within Tanzania
- Coordinates: 5.7585°S 34.7048°E
- Country: Tanzania
- Region: Singida Region
- District: Manyoni District
- Ward: Aghondi

Population (2016)
  - Total: 6,000
- Time zone: UTC+3 (EAT)

Aghondi is an administrative ward in the Manyoni District of the Singida Region of Tanzania. In 2016 the Tanzania National Bureau of Statistics report there were 6,000 people in the ward, from 5,468 in 2012.
