= Maghojoa =

Ward in Singida, Tanzania

Maghojoa Kata ya Maghojoa
- Ward
- Location within Tanzania
- Coordinates: 4.6759669°S 35.0114117°E
- Country: Tanzania
- Region: Singida Region
- District: Singida Rural
- Ward: Maghojoa

Population (2016)
  - Total: 9,857
- Time zone: UTC+3 (EAT)

Maghojoa is an administrative ward in the Singida Rural district of the Singida Region of Tanzania. In 2016 the Tanzania National Bureau of Statistics report there were 9,857 people in the ward, from 8,983 in 2012.
