= Majiri =

Coordinates: 6°03′S 35°01′E

Majiri is an administrative ward in the Manyoni District of the Singida Region of Tanzania. According to the 2002 census, the ward has a total population of 10,158.
