= Ikungi =

- Town
- Location in Tanzania
- Coordinates: 05°08′S 34°46′E
- Country: Tanzania
- Region: Singida Region
- District: Ikungi District

Population (2012)
  - Total: 12,661
- Time zone: GMT + 3
- Postal code: 43615
- Climate: BSh

Ikungi is a town and an administrative ward in the Ikungi District of the Singida Region of Tanzania. It is the district's administrative seat. According to the 2002 census, the ward had a total population of 18,662. According to the 2012 Tanzania National Census, the population of Ikungi ward was 12,661.

== Farming and Economics in Ikungi District ==
The Ikungi district, in addition to other areas of Tanzania and Eastern Africa, follows an agricultural system called agro-pastoralism. There is a total of six broad categories of farming, pastoralism being one of them. Pastoral livestock production is a crucial element in the livelihoods and economies of Africa's drylands. The land's physical characteristics, climatic conditions and plant communities are well suited for mobile livestock production. [1] Agro-pastoralism is based on livestock husbandry and crop farming.

In recent decades, the issue of climate change has negatively impacted the agricultural market due to the decrease in rainfall and increased dry weather. A study was conducted in 2016 in which data was collected from 411 agro-pastoralists in five districts of northern and central Tanzania. The analysis focused on the vulnerability of farmers in the area and the factors that contribute to their ability to adapt to climate changes due to man-made environmental issues. Climate variability will always present a challenge to the livelihood of farmers and, with human-caused changes, the adversity is accelerated to a point where the ability to adapt decreases. Risks for farmers are increased and the success of farming becomes more sensitive to external factors. The Ikungi farmers had the highest average exposure to climate changes, meaning they have the highest increase in temperature and largest decrease in rainfall. Farmers in this case have to improve their adaptive capacity in order to lessen their vulnerability to changing stimuli.

== Gender Issues ==
Similar to many cultures, women in Ikungi are not treated equal to their main counter-parts. Albeit – women are expected to maintain household duties, men manage the transaction of assets within the household and any other finance circumstances. Additionally, widowers are restricted within their rights to inherit properties.

== Transport ==
Paved trunk road T3 from Morogoro to the Rwandan border passes through the town. The two main modes of transportation are on roads and waterways. Water transport is more prevalent in Kimbwi village; the location of the Miyanji manmade dam. The Singida branch of the Central Railway of Tanzanian Railways passes through the town as well and there is a station at Ikungi town.
