= Siuyu =

Coordinates: 4°55′S 34°54′E

Siuyu is an administrative ward in the Singida Rural district of the Singida Region of Tanzania. According to the 2002 census, the ward has a total population of 8,632.
