= Chikuyu =

Ward in Singida Region, Tanzania

Chikuyu Kata ya Chikuyu
- Ward
- Location within Tanzania
- Coordinates: 6.95231°S 35.213875°E
- Country: Tanzania
- Region: Singida Region
- District: Manyoni District
- Ward: Chikuyu

Population (2016)
  - Total: 7,118
- Time zone: UTC+3 (EAT)

Chikuyu is an administrative ward in the Manyoni District of the Singida Region of Tanzania. In 2016 the Tanzania National Bureau of Statistics report there were 7,118 people in the ward, from 6,487 in 2012.
