= Mwaru =

Ward in Singida, Tanzania

Mwaru Kata ya Mwaru
- Ward
- Location within Tanzania
- Coordinates: 4.78403°S 34.065428°E
- Country: Tanzania
- Region: Singida Region
- District: Singida Rural
- Ward: Mwaru

Population (2016)
  - Total: 12,930
- Time zone: UTC+3 (EAT)

Mwaru is an administrative ward in the Singida Rural district of the Singida Region of Tanzania. In 2016 the Tanzania National Bureau of Statistics report there were 12,930 people in the ward, from 11,784 in 2012.
