= Mwankoko =

Ward in Singida, Tanzania

Mwankoko Kata ya Mwankoko
- Ward
- Location within Tanzania
- Coordinates: 4.8740898°S 34.68781°E
- Country: Tanzania
- Region: Singida Region
- District: Singida Urban
- Ward: Mwankoko

Population (2016)
  - Total: 7,131
- Time zone: UTC+3 (EAT)

Mwankoko is an administrative ward in the Singida Urban district of the Singida Region of Tanzania. In 2016 the Tanzania National Bureau of Statistics report there were 7,131 people in the ward, from 10,548 in 2012.
