= Isseke =

Ward in Manyoni, Singida, Tanzania

Isseke Kata ya Isseke
- Ward
- Location within Tanzania
- Coordinates: 5.845883°S 34.931267°E
- Country: Tanzania
- Region: Singida Region
- District: Manyoni District
- Ward: Isseke

Population (2016)
  - Total: 13,402
- Time zone: UTC+3 (EAT)

Isseke is an administrative ward in the Manyoni District of the Singida Region of Tanzania. In 2016 the Tanzania National Bureau of Statistics report there were 13,402 people in the ward, from 12,214 in 2012.
