= Isanzu people =

Ethnic group from Singida Region of Tanzania

The Isanzu (Anyihanzu) are a Bantu ethno-linguistic group based in Mkalama District, Singida Region, Tanzania. In 1987 the Isanzu population was estimated to number 32,400 . The Isanzu have matrilineal descent groups and are agriculturalists who subsist on sorghum, millet, and maize. Most Isanzu make a living as farmers and through migrant labour to other parts of the country, principally, Arusha.

Isanzuland was colonized by Germany in the late 19th century (this happened after a short war between the isanzu and the Germans who were under Waldemer Walther in 1894.), and during the First World War, occupied by British forces. Following the war Tanganyika became a British Trust Territory and a British administration governed this area, like the rest of the Territory, through a policy of Indirect Rule until independence in 1961.

== Language ==
The Isanzu speak a Bantu language called kinyihanzu. Nearly everyone also speaks Swahili, Tanzania's lingua franca. Because of interaction with Iraq Nyaturu, and Nyiramba people also speak Iraq, Nyaturu, and Nyiramba.

== Big Clans and Families ==
1. Kitunga
2. Msindai
3. Mpeku
4. Manzawa
5. Mpinga
6. Mahumi
7. Malalika
8. Gang'ai
9. Mpanda
10. Mkilanya
11. Mzengi
12. Holela
13. Mikael
14. Mtiko
15. Ibobo
16. Saenda
17. Giisi (Yagisi)
18. Pyuza (Taken from Nyiramba)

== Removal and Restitution of ancestral human remains ==
=== Removal during German colonial rule ===
During the period of German colonial rule in East Africa, human remains belonging to members of the Isanzu community were removed from burial sites in present day Mkalama District, Singida Region, Tanzania. In 1911, German geographer Erich Obst undertook an expedition to the region on behalf of the Hamburg Geographical Society with support from the German Colonial Office.

Obst's expedition investigated the geography, natural environment and inhabitants of the region. Between April and September 1911, the skeletal remains of 22 Isanzu individuals were excavated with suggestions that the burial sites may have been near the German military station in Mkalama. The remains were transported to Germany and entered the anthropology collection of the Museum fur Volkerkunde in Hamburg, where they were inventoried in 1912. During the 1950s and 1960s, the museum's anthropological collection was transferred to the University of Gottingen. The Isanzu remains formed a part of the university's Anthropological collection

=== Research and Identification ===
Investigation into the provenance of human remains held in German institutes developed during the early 2020s. The University of Gottingen carried out research into the ancestral remains acquired during the colonial period. Between august and November 2022, researchers examined 66 sets of ancestral remains from central Tanzania held in the university's collection. These included remains associated with the Isanzu, Burunge, Sandawe, Irangi, Maasai, Tindiga and Nyaturu people.

The research involved collaboration between German and Tanzanian scholars including Maximilian Felix Chami, Alma Simba and Holger Stoecker. They sought to reconstruct the circumstances under which the remains had been acquired, identify their geographical and cultural origins, and investigate community perspectives on their possible return.

== Notes ==
Adam, Virginia 1963. Rainmaking rites in Ihanzu. Conference proceedings from the Makarere Institute of Social Research. Adam is a social anthropologist who worked with the Isanzu in 1961 and 1962.

- Kohl-Larsen, Ludwig (1956a). Das Elefantenspiel. Mythen, Riesen und Stammessagen. Volkserzählungen der Tindiga (in German). Eisenach • Kassel: Erich Röth-Verlag. The book is a collection of Hadza myths about giants, also some myths about culture heroes, and anecdotical tales. Kohl-Larsen was an adventurer, amateur ethnographer and archaeologist. He travelled through (then) Tanganyika in the 1930s, and very much hoped that the former German colony would soon be returned, which never happened. His ethnographic accounts are deeply coloured by Nazi Germany's political ambitions and are not a reliable source of information.

Sanders, Todd 2008. Beyond Bodies: Rainmaking and Sense Making in Tanzania. Toronto: University of Toronto Press. Sanders is a social anthropologist who worked in Isanzu in the 1990s.
