= Muhintiri =

Administrative ward in ikungi. Singida, Tanzania

Muhintiri Kata ya Muhintiri
- Ward
- Location within Tanzania
- Coordinates: 5.1778028°S 34.5847717°E
- Country: Tanzania
- Region: Singida Region
- District: Singida Rural
- Ward: Muhintiri

Population (2016)
  - Total: 9,761
- Time zone: UTC+3 (EAT)

Muhintiri is an administrative ward in the Singida Rural district of the Singida Region of Tanzania. In 2016 the Tanzania National Bureau of Statistics report there were 9,761 people in the ward, from 8,896 in 2012.
