= Makanda (Manyoni ward) =

Ward in Manyoni, Singida, Tanzania

Makanda Kata ya Makanda
- Ward
- Location within Tanzania
- Coordinates: 5.7477362°S 35.2907908°E
- Country: Tanzania
- Region: Singida Region
- District: Manyoni District
- Ward: Makanda

Population (2016)
  - Total: 10,718
- Time zone: UTC+3 (EAT)

Makanda is an administrative ward in the Manyoni District of the Singida Region of Tanzania. In 2016 the Tanzania National Bureau of Statistics report there were 10,718 people in the ward, from 9,768 in 2012.
