= Kindai, Tanzania =

Ward in Singida, Tanzania

Kindai Kata ya Kindai
- Ward
- Location within Tanzania
- Coordinates: 4.834914°S 34.74706°E
- Country: Tanzania
- Region: Singida Region
- District: Singida Urban
- Ward: Kindai

Population (2016)
  - Total: 13,889
- Time zone: UTC+3 (EAT)

Kindai is an administrative ward in the Singida Urban district of the Singida Region of Tanzania. In 2016 the Tanzania National Bureau of Statistics report there were 13,889 people in the ward, from 12,658 in 2012.
