= Puma (Tanzanian ward) =

Coordinates: 5°00′S 34°44′E

Puma is an administrative ward in the Singida Rural district of the Singida Region of Tanzania. According to the 2002 census, the ward has a total population of 16,198.
