= Sanza (Tanzanian ward) =

Ward in Manyoni, Singida, Tanzania

Sanza Kata ya Sanza
- Ward
- Location within Tanzania
- Country: Tanzania
- Region: Singida Region
- District: Manyoni District
- Ward: Sanza

Population (2016)
  - Total: 11,397
- Time zone: UTC+3 (EAT)

Sanza is an administrative ward in the Manyoni District of the Singida Region of Tanzania. In 2016 the Tanzania National Bureau of Statistics report there were 11,397 people in the ward, from 10,387 in 2012.
