= Kintinku =

Administrative ward in Tanzania

Coordinates: 5°53′S 35°14′E

Kintinku is an administrative ward in the Manyoni District of the Singida Region of Tanzania. According to the 2002 census, the ward has a total population of 7,493.
