= Manyoni (Tanzanian ward) =

Ward in Manyoni, Tanzania

Manyoni Kata ya Manyoni
- Ward
- Location within Tanzania
- Country: Tanzania
- Region: Singida Region
- District: Manyoni District
- Ward: Manyoni

Population (2016)
  - Total: 27,986
- Time zone: UTC+3 (EAT)

Manyoni is an administrative ward in the Manyoni District of the Singida Region of Tanzania. In 2016 the Tanzania National Bureau of Statistics report there were 27,986 people in the ward, from 25,505 in 2012.
