= Manyoni =

- Town
- Location in Tanzania
- Coordinates: 05°45′S 34°50′E
- Country: Tanzania
- Region: Singida Region
- District: Manyoni District

Population (2012)
  - Total: 25,505
- Time zone: GMT + 3
- Climate: BSh

Manyoni is a town in central Tanzania. It is the district headquarter of Manyoni District.

== Transport ==
Paved trunk road T3 from Morogoro to the Rwanda border passes through the town.

The town of Manyoni has a station on the Central Railway of the Tanzanian Railways. The Singida line branches off from the main line in Manyoni town.

== Population ==
According to the 2012 national census the population of Manyoni town - which is located in Manyoni ward - is 25,505.
