= Turu people (Tanzania) =

Ethnic and linguistic group based in the Singida Region of north-central Tanzania

Tυrυ
- Person: Mυnyatυrυ, Mυrιmi
- People: Wanyatυrυ, Arιmi
- Language: Kιnyatυrυ, Kιrιmi
- Country: Unyatυrυ, Urιmi

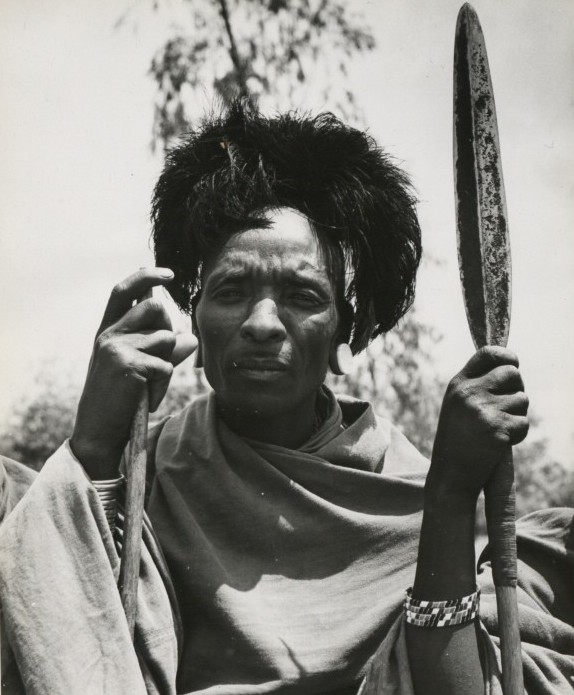
Nyaturu warrior.

The Turu (Arimi, Wanyaturu) are an ethnic and linguistic group based in the Singida Region of north-central Tanzania, who speak the Bantu language Kinyaturu. In 1993, the Turu population was estimated to number 556,000. The current population of the Turu is now over 1,000,000. They speak the Turu language.

Arimi (the people of Rimi) is the original endonym. The word Arimi itself literally means farmers. Wanyaturu (the people of Nyaturu) is replacing it, reflecting Swahili contact; indeed, the prefix wa- is Swahili rather than the Turu a-.

== Tribal composition ==
The Turu people are three tribes, the Airwana (Wilwana), half the Turu population, including the city of Singida; the Vahi (Wahi), and the small Anyiŋanyi (wanying'anyi). Each tribe is composed of several clans, such as the Anyahatι and Akahiυ of the Wahi. Most of the Turu are brown, tall, thin with long noses and light black hair. Despite little differences in dialects, people among these tribes can understand each other. While most of Nyaturu people live in Singida region in central Tanzania, a few number is constantly migrating to neighbor regions such as Manyara, Tabora, Morogoro and others for more promising lands for farming and pastures.

== Social organization ==
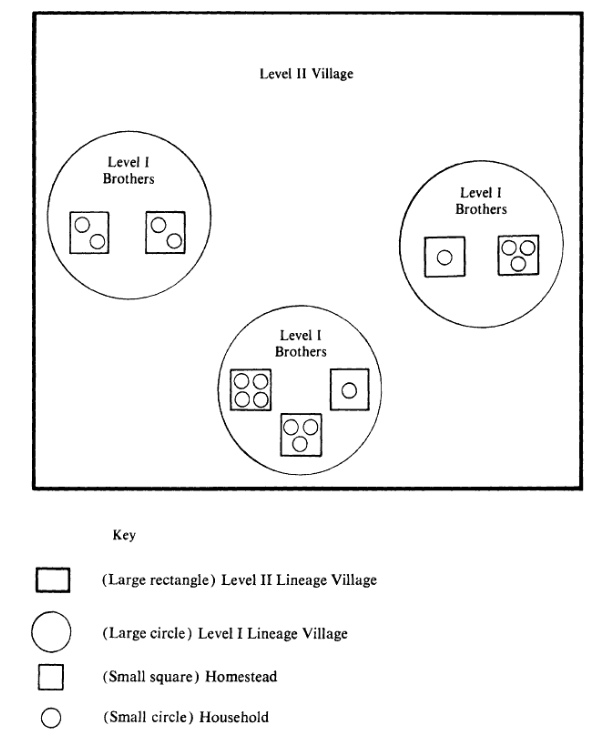
A diagram visualizing Turu village composition.

The Turu people define their social organization through lineage or ancestry. The photo to the right visualizes the social composition of the average Turu village. The first level lineage (level 1) is made up of adult brothers, and a second level lineage (level 2) is made up of several level 1 lineages. A Turu village is described as a single level 2 lineage. Several level 2 lineages make a clan (level 3), and several level 3 lineages make up a subtribe (level 4).

Chiefdoms of Turu clans has usually been determined by patrilineal lineage and territory. The chief of the clan is the “eldest son of the senior wife of the clan’s founder." In a case of dissatisfaction or death of the candidate, the family elders of the royal sub-clan would gather and “elect” the chief of the clan. The chief of the clan and the elders have been the “preservers of the law.” The elders have the responsibility to teach the youth their rights and obligations.

== Religious practices and beliefs ==
The primary religion practiced amongst the Turu people is Christianity. The sun plays a very important role in Turu society. One of the Nyaturu famous prayers, The Prayer of the Sun, demonstrates the importance of the sun's grace and the role it plays in their understanding of the seasons, agriculture, and way of life.

Turu people are among the first tribes in the region to compose rituals’ prayers. Turu people’s address their prayer to God during very spiritual and emotional rituals, which are help on special occasions such as betrothal rituals. For example, the prayer called “Ukuta Yuva” in Kinyaturu, which means “To praise the Sun,” is a traditional hymn that praises God and asks for His blessings. In the Ukuta Yuva prayer, Turu people praise the power and goodness of the “Yuva” (the Sun), which is a symbol of God. They also pay homage to Mweri (the Moon), Gimea (the Pleiades). During the prayer ritual, two elderly men sit facing each other. While one recites the prayer slowly, the other listens and bows, saying in a quiet voice “eheé eheé,” which means “yes yes” and “trute,” which means “very true, Sir,” continuously until the end of the recitation of the prayer.

== Economic system ==
Acquiring cattle is the main goal of Turu economic activity. People in Turu society can acquire cattle through grain production. There are three essential resources contributing to the production of excess grain. They are land, livestock, and workers, or wives. Land is needed to grow crops. Livestock is needed to operate the ploughs, and women are needed to harvest the crops. Utilizing these three resources can help a man produce more grain than needed for subsistence, and that excess grain is used to purchase cattle at the market. While small animals usually belong to the members of the family, cattle are sometimes borrowed from the rich neighborhoods for milk and manure. In addition to cattle herding, they usually grow crops for food and merely for sale. The main crops are uwele, maize and mtama. They also grow cassava and sweet potatoes in the plateaus. In recent years however these people have developed an interest in growing some commercial crops such as sunflowers and onions due to relatively increase in markets in the region. However the commercial success is very limited due to both poor farming methods and unreliable weather. Apart from farming, the Nyaturu people also play a great deal in animal husbandry. More than 70% of the Nyaturu households have ranch like farming areas with cattle, goats, sheep and chicken.Vahi people among others are good producers of honey and tobacco as well. Food to the Turu people is a form of sociality that constitutes and mediates human interactions and social hierarchy. One of the staple foods is called ugali, a stiff porridge that consists of water, maize, millet, and sorghum flour. Ugali is served with a side dish (mboga) or dried fish, meat, or greens. A popular mboga among the Turu is Mlenda, which is made up of leafy greens, tomatoes, okra, salt, milk, and peanuts to form a green sauce.

=== Land acquisition ===
A Turu man can obtain land through inheritance or clearing new fields. It is forbidden to exchange land for cattle within a village, however, land can be loaned between village members.

=== Wife acquisition ===
Wives are important within the Turu economy because they are the ones who work the farms, and most importantly, produce the grain. Wives are acquired by bride-wealth through cattle. Bride-wealth negotiation is conducted by both the bride and the groom's representatives. Once the bride-wealth has been negotiated, it is paid over the course of several years.

Nyaturu people usually live in integration with other tribes in the region such as Iraqwi, Wagogo, Nyiramba, Nyamwezi, Sukuma, Sandawe and the Barabaig. The Nyaturu language is one of the Bantu languages prominently in the sub-Sahara region.
