= Turu language =

Bantu language spoken in Tanzania

Turu
- Nyaturu
- Kιnyatυrυ, Kιrιmi
- Native to: Tanzania
- Ethnicity: Turu
- Native speakers: 600,000 (2006)
- Language family: Niger–Congo?: Atlantic–Congo; Volta-Congo; Benue–Congo; Bantoid; Southern Bantoid; Bantu; Nyaturu-Nilamba-Isanzu; Turu

Language codes
- ISO 639-3: rim
- Glottolog: nyat1246
- Guthrie code: F.32

Tυrυ
- Person: Mυnyatυrυ, Mυrιmi
- People: Wanyatυrυ, Arιmi
- Language: Kιnyatυrυ, Kιrιmi
- Country: Unyatυrυ, Urιmi

The Turu or Nyaturu language, Kinyaturu, also known as Rimi Kirimi, is a Bantu language of spoken by the Wanyaturu also known as Arimi of the Singida region of Tanzania. Excluding the Bantu language prefixes Ke- and Ki-, other spellings of the language are Limi and Remi. Dialects of the three Turu tribes are Girwana of the Airwana (Wilwana) in the north, Giahi of the Vahi (Wahi) in the south and west, and Ginyamunyinganyi of the Anyiŋanyi (Wanyinganyi) in the east.

== Phonology ==
=== Consonants ===
		Bilabial			Alveolar			Post-alv./ Palatal		Velar			Uvular		Glottal	
		plain	lab.	pal.	plain	lab.	pal.	plain	lab.	plain	lab.	pal.	plain	lab.	plain	lab.
Nasal		m	mʷ	mʲ	n	nʷ		ɲ	ɲʷ	ŋ	ŋʷ					
Plosive/ Affricate	voiceless	p			t			t͡ʃ	t͡ʃʷ	k	kʷ	kʲ				
Plosive/ Affricate	voiced	b	bʷ		d	dʷ		d͡ʒ	d͡ʒʷ	ɡ	ɡʷ					
Plosive/ Affricate	prenasal vl.	ᵐp	ᵐpʷ	ᵐpʲ	ⁿt	ⁿtʷ	ⁿtʲ	ᶮt͡ʃ	ᶮt͡ʃʷ	ᵑk	ᵑkʷ					
Plosive/ Affricate	prenasal vd.	ᵐb	ᵐbʷ	ᵐbʲ	ⁿd	ⁿdʷ	ⁿdʲ	ᶮd͡ʒ	ᶮd͡ʒʷ	ᵑɡ	ᵑɡʷ					
Fricative	voiceless	ɸ	ɸʷ	ɸʲ	s	sʷ	sʲ			x	xʷ				h	hʷ
Fricative	voiced	β		βʲ						ɣ	ɣʷ		ʁ	ʁʷ		
Fricative	prenasal				ⁿs	ⁿsʷ				ᵑx	ᵑxʷ		ᶰʁ			
Flap	voiceless				ɾ̥	ɾ̥ʷ	ɾ̥ʲ									
Flap	voiced				ɾ	ɾʷ	ɾʲ									
Approximant					l	lʷ	lʲ	j	jʷ	w						

=== Vowels ===
	Front	Central	Back
Close	i iː		u uː
Near-close	ɪ ɪː		ʊ ʊː
Mid	e eː		o oː
Open		a aː	

- Short vowel sounds /e, o/ may also be heard as more open [ɛ, ɔ] as allophones.
