= Singida =

City in Singida Region, Tanzania

- City of Singida Region
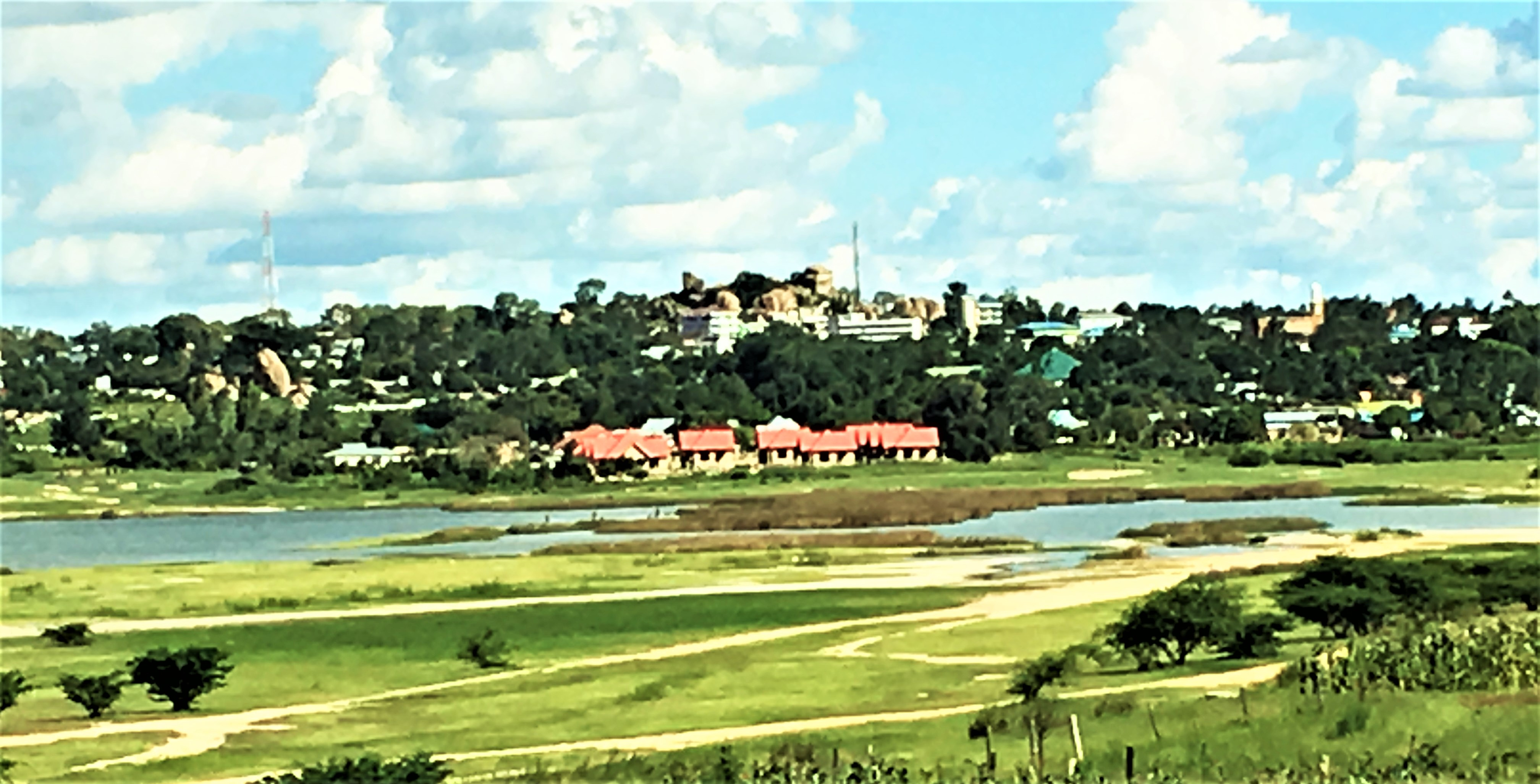
- The Singida city by the lakes

- Location of Singida Singida (Africa) Singida (Earth)
- Coordinates: 04°49′S 34°45′E
- Country: Tanzania
- Region: Singida Region
- District: Singida Urban District

Government
  - Type: Town Council

Population (2022 census)
  - City of Singida Region: 232,459
  - Urban: 165,492
- Time zone: GMT + 3
- Climate: BSh
- Website: Regional website

Singida is a city in central Tanzania. The city is the location of the regional headquarters of Singida Region as well as the district headquarters of Singida Urban District. The region and district are named after the city.

== Transport ==
=== Road links ===
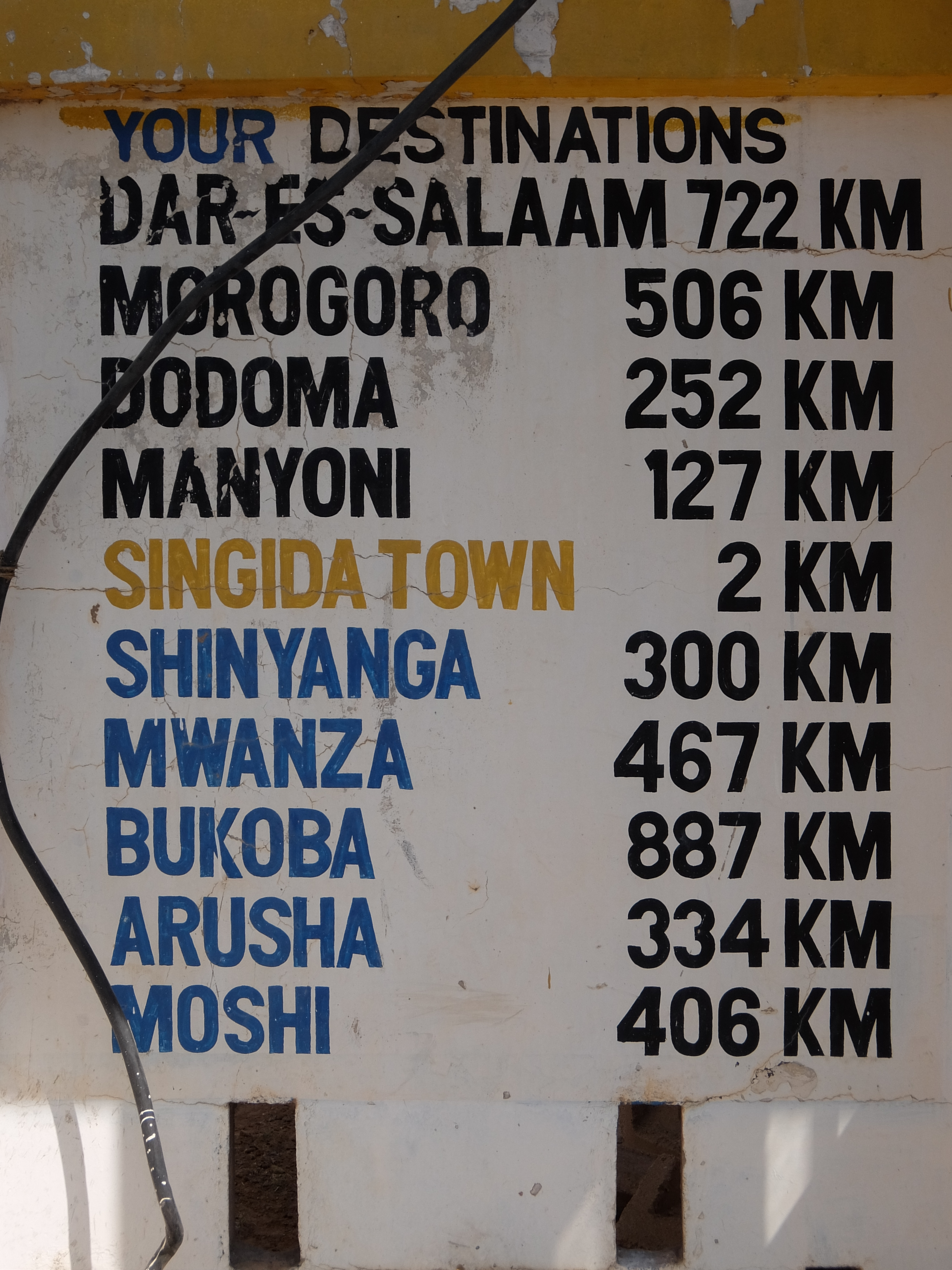
Distance from Singida to other cities in Tanzania

Paved Trunk road T3 from Morogoro to the Rwandan border passes through the town. Paved trunk road T14 connects Singida with Babati in Manyara Region. The distance from Singida to Dodoma is 252 km, to Shinyanga 300 km, to Arusha 334 km and to Mwanza 467 km.

=== Railway links ===
The Singida branch of the Central Line railway connects Singida with the town of Manyoni, which is on the main line.

=== Airport ===
The town is served by the Singida AirStrip near the B141 north west of Singida.

== Places of interest ==
Singida town boasts two places of interest;

=== Lake Singida ===
This saline lake is just outside Singida Town. It attracts many birds, such as pelicans and flamingos.

=== Regional Museum ===
This museum shows artifacts from Singida Region's tribes, such as weapons and jewellery. It is located at the Open University of Tanzania.

== Population ==
The 2012 national census estimated the population of Singida Urban District at 150,379.

== See also ==
- Singida Region
- Singida Urban District
- Regions of Tanzania
- Districts of Tanzania
- Railway stations in Tanzania

== Gallery ==
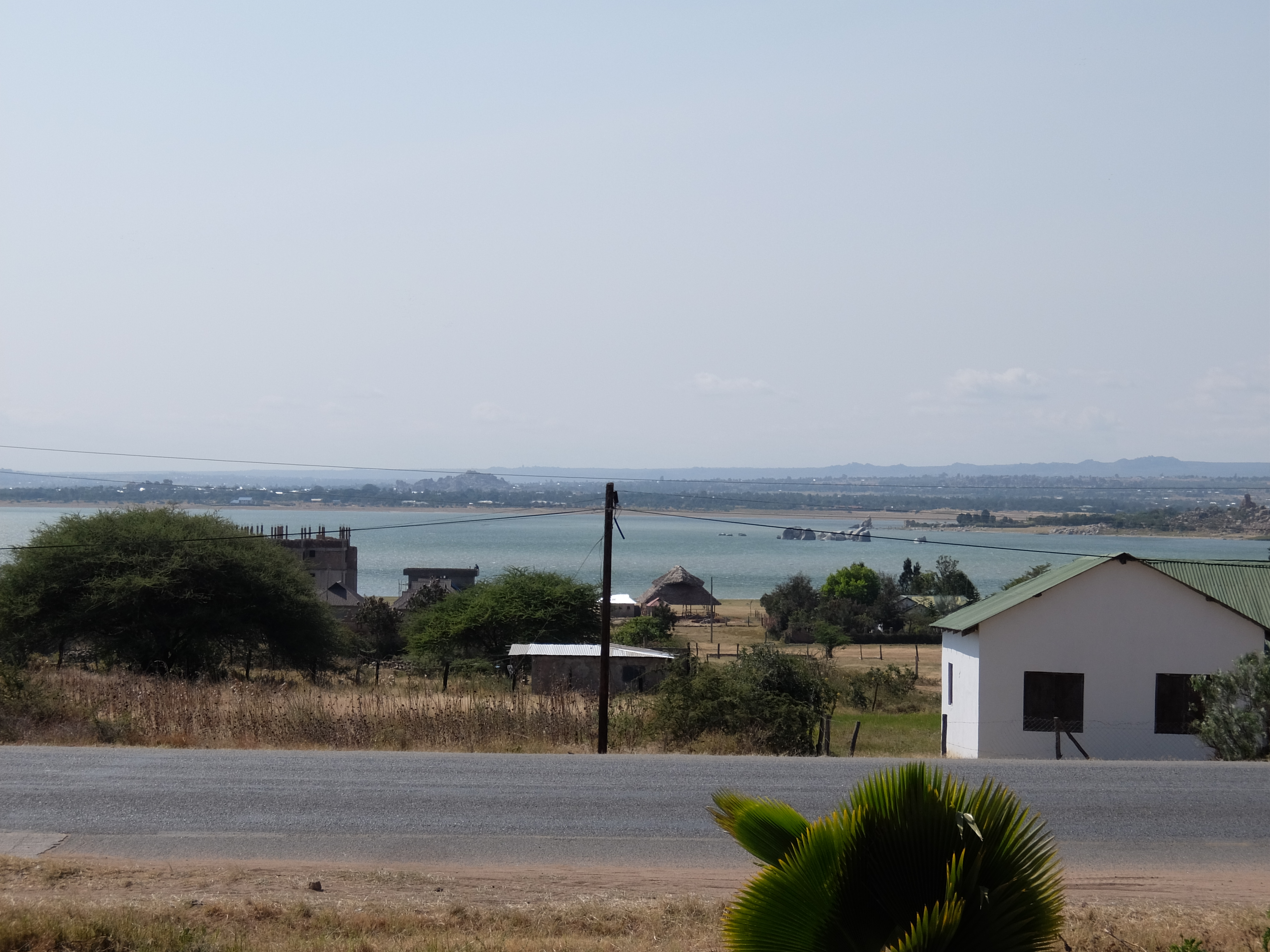
Lake Singida.

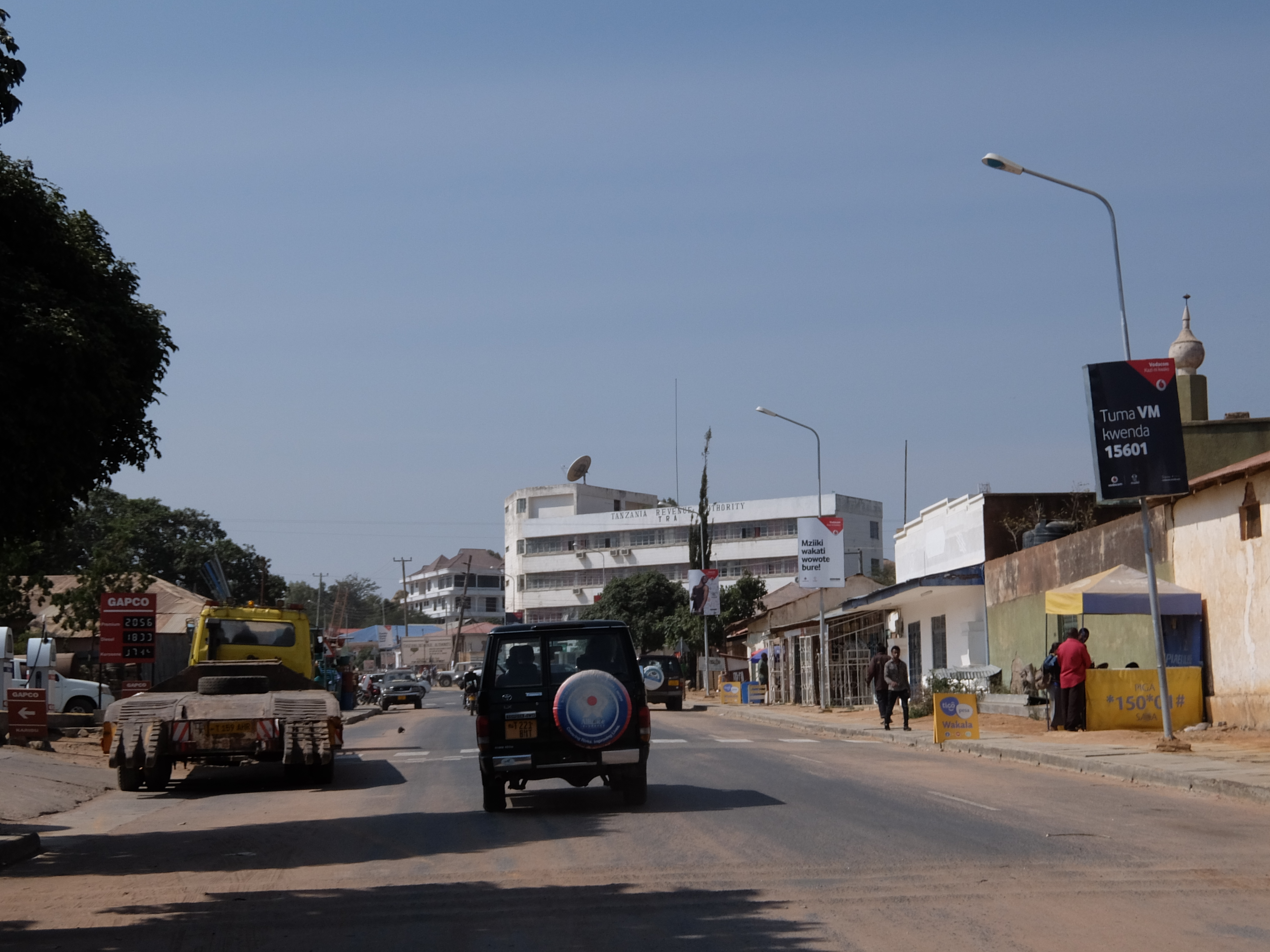
Main street in Singida town.
