= Central Line (Tanzania) =

Railway line in Tanzania

Coordinates: 6°S 35°E

Tanzania Central Line

Overview
- Termini: Dar es Salaam
- Website: https://www.trc.co.tz/

Service
- Type: Heavy rail
- Operator: Tanzania Railways Corporation

History
- Commenced: 1905

Technical
- Line length: 2,707 km (1,682 mi)
- Track gauge: 1,000 mm (3 ft 3 3/8 in) metre gauge

Railway network 1000mm gauge, 1067mm gauge

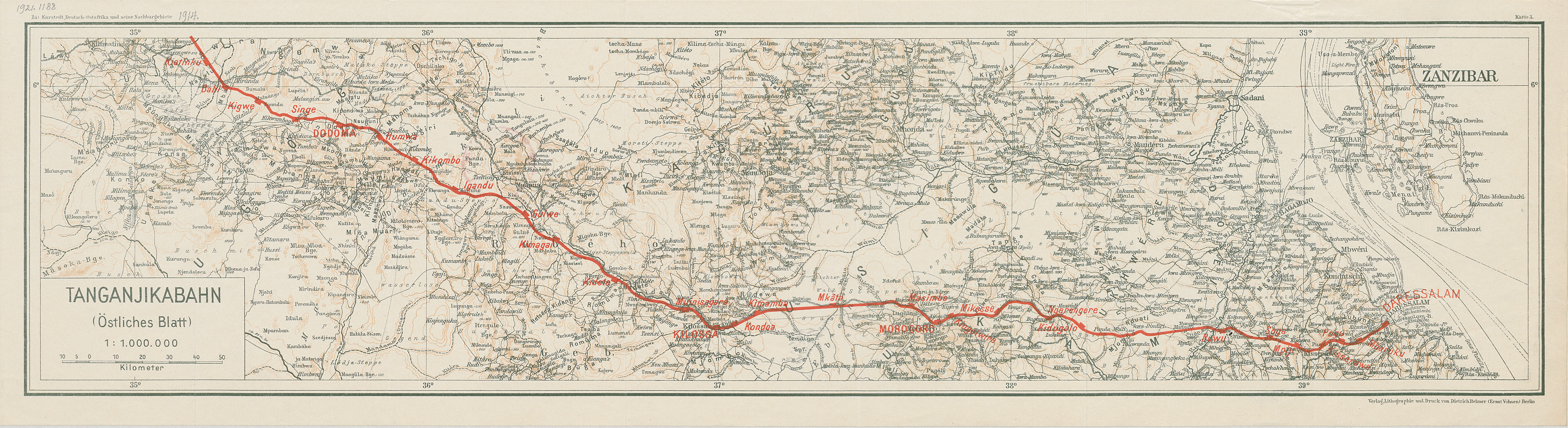
1914 map of Dar es Salaam- Kintinku section

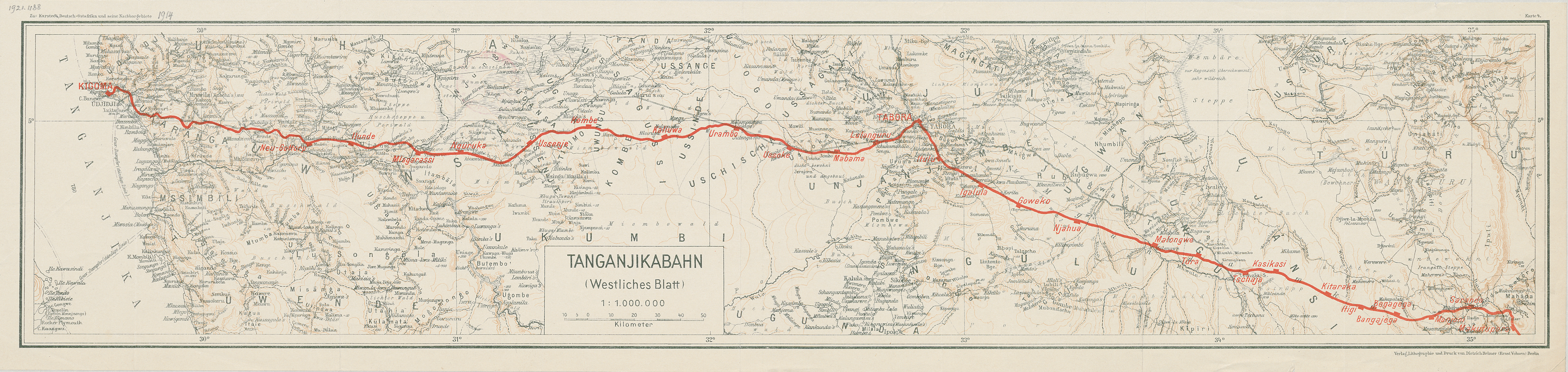
1914 map of Makutupora-Kigoma section

The Central Line (German: Mittellandbahn or Zentralbahn), formerly known as the Tanganyika Railway (German: Tanganjikabahn) is the most important railway line in Tanzania, apart from TAZARA. It runs west from Dar es Salaam to Kigoma on Lake Tanganyika via Dodoma. Extensions of the central route branch to the cities of Mwanza on Lake Victoria, Tanga, Singida and Mpanda.

In 2017, Tanzania began the Tanzania Standard Gauge Railway project, which will construct a standard gauge (1435 mm) line parallel to the meter-gauge (1000 mm) Central Line between Dar es Salaam and Mwanza, with a new route branching northwest at Isaka to Kigali in Rwanda.

== History ==
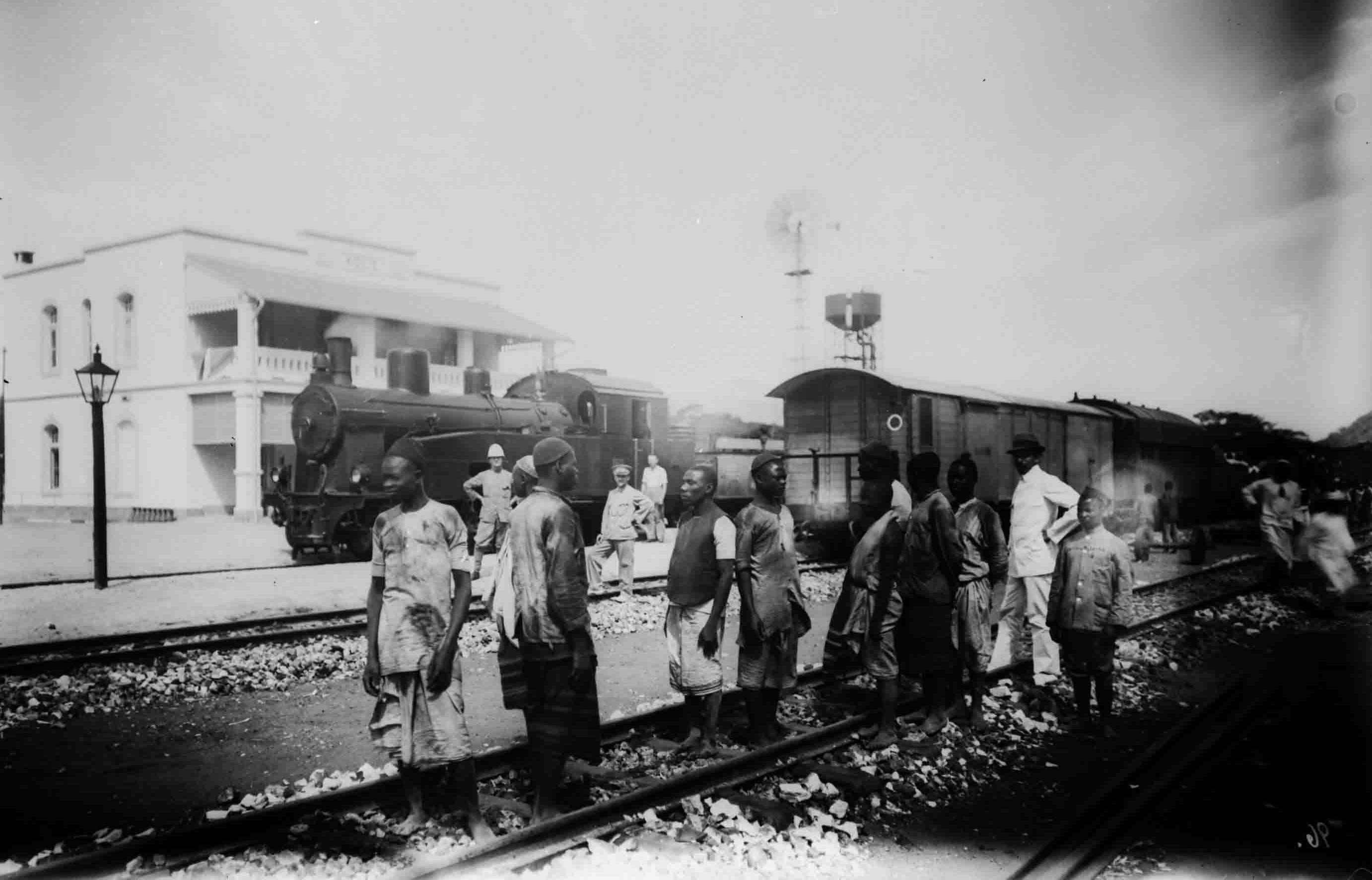
Kidete railway station

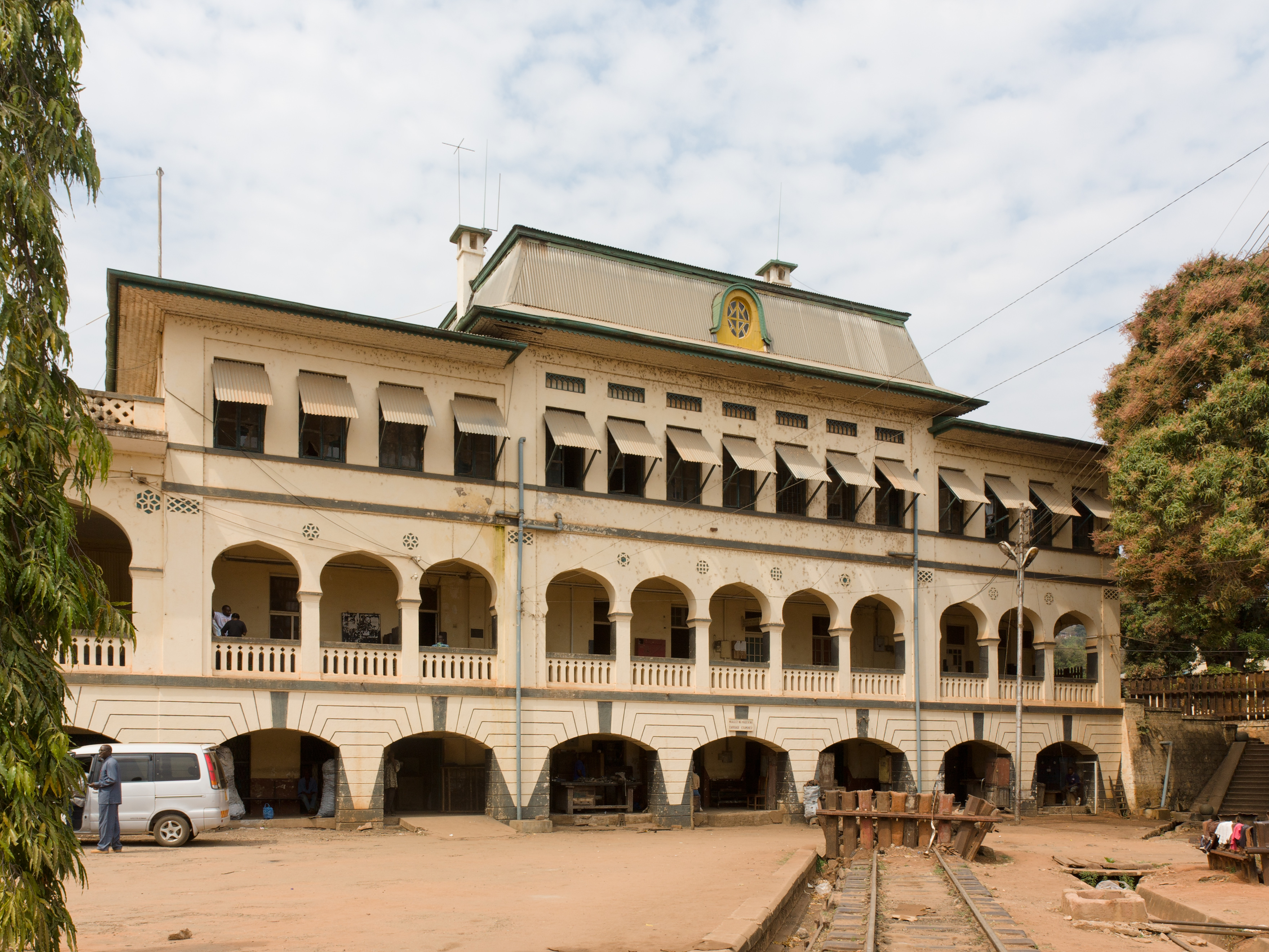
Kigoma railway station, viewed from the station yard in 2010

=== German period ===
The Central Line was the second railway project coming into existence in the colony of then German East Africa after the Usambara Railway. For the Tanganjikabahn-project a company was founded, the Ostafrikanische Eisenbahngesellschaft (OAEG) (East African Railway Company) which started railway construction in 1905 with 21 million marks (ℳ) provided by Adolph von Hansemann's Disconto-Gesellschaft (Discounting Company) bank. The building started at the port and capital of that time, Dar es Salaam.

From the start the engineers fought large difficulties, the tropical climate, periodic heavy rain and lack of appropriate building material. On the other hand, they could count on the experiences from the previous building of the Usambara Railway. The 1,000 mm (3 ft 3 3/8 in), meter-gauge, was chosen. The Central Line is the largest technical inheritance of the German colonial age in Tanzania.

The construction followed a centuries-old caravan route cleared by Arab traders to Tabora, which gave large logistic advantages. German settlers soon followed with plantations, and Tabora developed into a large agricultural centre. Kilometer 200 was reached in 1907, in the vicinity of the town of Morogoro. In 1909 the railhead reached Kilosa. Kigoma at Lake Tanganyika at kilometer 1252 was reached in 1914 just prior to the First World War. The regular travel time over the total distance amounted to 58 hours. It was planned to develop the line further to Iringa and to reach Lake Malawi, a project which was stopped due to the war.

The construction of the line opened up trade between Lake Tanganyika and the east coast and spurred the growth of the ports at its termini.

=== British Mandate ===
The British mandate added to the Central Line three branch lines. The most important one, of 379 km (235 mi), ran from Tabora to Mwanza at the south bank of the Lake Victoria. Another ran from Kilosa to Mikumi. A third, established in 1931, ran 93.58 mi (150.60 km) from Manyoni via Singida to Kinyangiri; the section north of Singida closed between 1944 and 1947.

=== After independence ===
After the independence of Tanzania, the Central Line and the Usambara Railway were connected between the stations of Mruazi and Ruvu.

In September 2022, the Tanzania Intermodal and Rail Development Project phase 1 concluded which includes track and bridge rehabilitation, axle load capacity enhancement, and the revitalization of intermodal terminals along the 970 km stretch between Dar es Salaam and Isaka.

Another $200 million was approved in 2024 for phase 2 from the International Development Association to enhance safety, climate resilience and operational efficiency.

In August 2024, the passenger traffic on standard gauge between Dar Es Salaam and Dodoma was inaugurated.

== The Main Line ==
The Central Line starts at the Tanzanian metropolis of Dar es Salaam at the Indian Ocean with today's capital of Tanzania, Dodoma, in the center of the country and proceeds further to Tanzania’s most important port at the shore of Lake Tanganyika, Kigoma. It crosses central Tanzania completely with a length of 1,254 kilometers (779 mi) and overcomes the height of the east edge East African rift valley. The main stations on this line are: Dar es Salaam, Ruvu, Morogoro, Kilosa, Dodoma, Manyoni, Tabora and Kaliua.

=== Mwanza Line ===
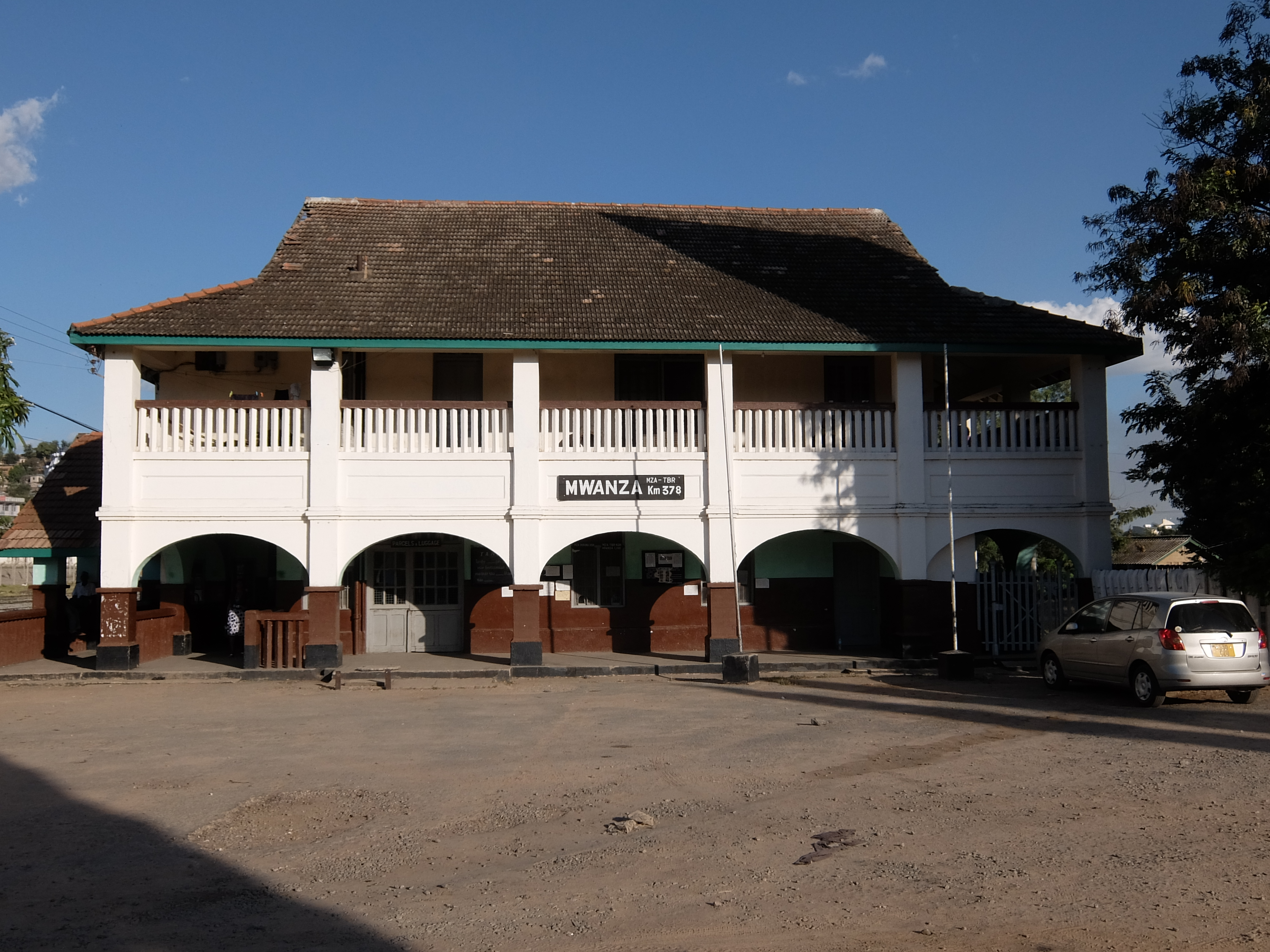
Mwanza Train Station as seen from the main road in the centre of Mwanza town.

The Mwanza Railway line connects with the main line at Tabora station and ends at Mwanza railway station. The distance covered by this railway line is 378 km. Its construction started at Tabora in 1923 and ended in Mwanza in 1928. A dry port was constructed at the town of Isaka, for freight transport to Rwanda and Burundi. The main stations along the Mwanza Railway line are: Tabora, Kakola, Isaka, Shinyanga and Mwanza.

=== Mikumi line ===
The Mikumi line, built between 1958 and 1963, branches southwards off the Central Line at Kilosa and crosses the Mkata Plain to Kidatu, where it meets the 1,067 mm gauge TAZARA Railway at a break-of-gauge.

== Traffic ==
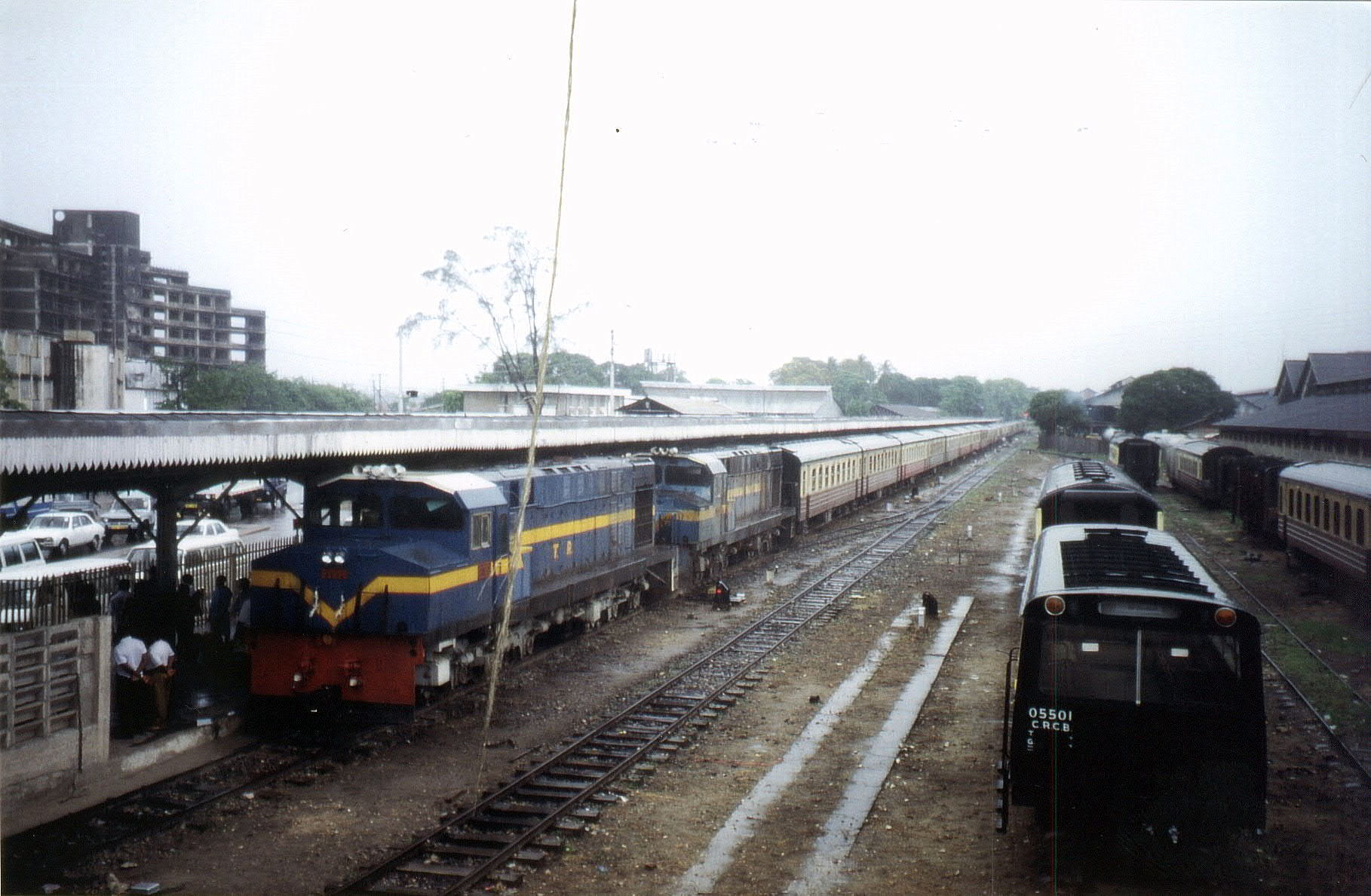
Passenger train in the main station of Dar es Salaam

Today’s rail services are offered by the Tanzania Railways Corporation. The timetable offers two passenger services per week in each direction covering the whole length of the line. A trip from Dar es Salaam to Kigoma takes approximately 40 hours today according to the timetable. The long time of travel is due to the poor state of the railway’s infrastructure, which originates to a large extent still from the German colonial times. Three classes are offered, whereby the second class also provides sleeping cars and the first class offers sleeping cars only. The standard of a sleeping car of second class corresponds rather to a couchette by European standards.

Flooding in December 2009 caused serious disruption; operations resumed in June 2010.

== See also ==
- History of rail transport in Tanzania
- Rail transport in Tanzania
- Railway stations in Tanzania

== Literature ==
- Franz Balzer: Die Kolonialbahnen mit besonderer Berücksichtigung Afrikas. Berlin 1916. Reprint: Leipzig 2008. ISBN 978-3-8262-0233-9.
- Helmut Schroeter: Die Eisenbahnen der ehemaligen deutschen Schutzgebiete Afrikas und ihre Fahrzeuge = Die Fahrzeuge der deutschen Eisenbahnen 7. Frankfurt 1961.
