= Singida Rural =

Singida Rural District
- District
- Singida Rural District's location within Singida Region.
- Coordinates: 04°44′S 35°02′E
- Country: Tanzania
- Region: Singida Region

Area
  - Total: 2,400 km^{2} (930 sq mi)

Population (2022)
  - Total: 284,895
  - Density: 120/km^{2} (310/sq mi)

Singida Rural District is one of the six districts of the Singida Region of Tanzania. It is bordered to the north by Mkalama District, to the east by Manyara Region and Dodoma Region, to the south by Ikungi District and to the west by Singida Urban District. Its administrative seat is the town of Singida.

According to the 2012 Tanzania National Census, the population of Singida Rural District was 225,521. By 2022, the population had grown to 284,895.

== Life in the Region ==
Crop farming is the predominant means of sustenance in this particular region, providing both income and daily food requirements. Locals employ the use of oxen to till the land for cultivation. However, electricity remains limited within the area. The majority of inhabitants rely on wick lamps for illumination and wood as a primary source of fuel for cooking food. Access to government facilities is scarce in this region.

== Transport ==
In the Singida Rural District, there is a paved trunk road, known as T14, that connects Singida and Babati. This road serves as a main transportation route for both goods and people travelling between the two locations.

Within the rural areas of Singida district, transportation options are limited and predominantly consist of taxis, buses, animal-drawn carts, and bicycles. These services are largely in the hands of private operators. The average cost to travel around Singida using these methods is approximately 3-5 USD per kilometer.

As for regulations, there is a lack of enforcement in the Singida rural area. The presence of motor vehicles is minimal, making traffic control and management a low priority of the local government. Furthermore, due to poor road conditions, vehicles are unable to travel at high speeds throughout the region.

== Administrative subdivisions ==
As of 2012, Singida Rural District was administratively divided into 21 wards.

=== Wards ===
- Ikhanoda
- Ilongero
- Itaja
- Kijota
- Kinyagigi
- Kinyeto
- Maghojoa
- Makuro
- Merya
- Mgori
- Mrama
- Msange
- Msisi
- Mtinko
- Mudida
- Mughamo
- Mughunga
- Mwasauya
- Ngimu
- Ntonge
- Ughandi
