= Singida Region =

Region in Tanzania

Singida Region Mkoa wa Singida (Swahili)
- Region
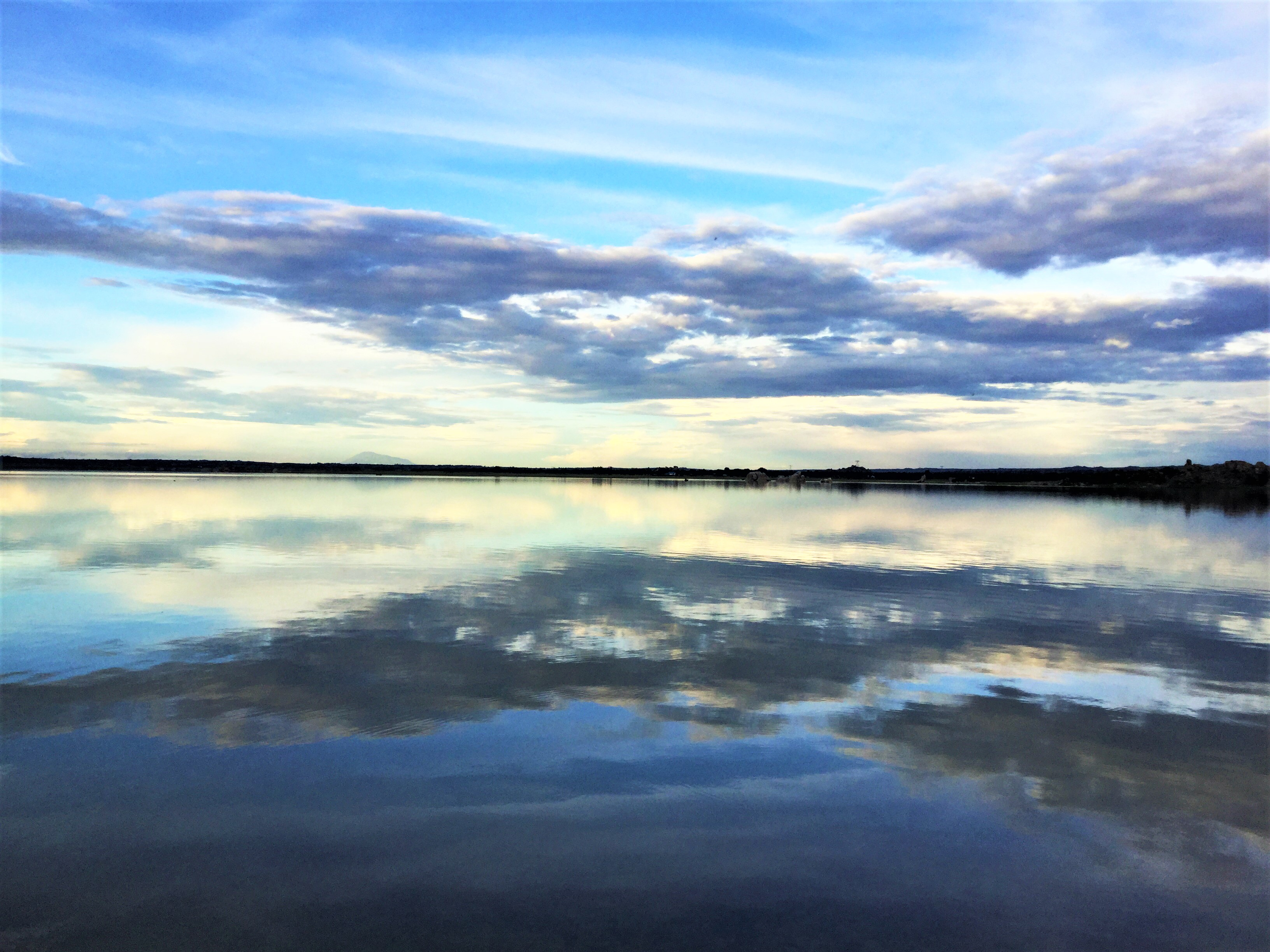
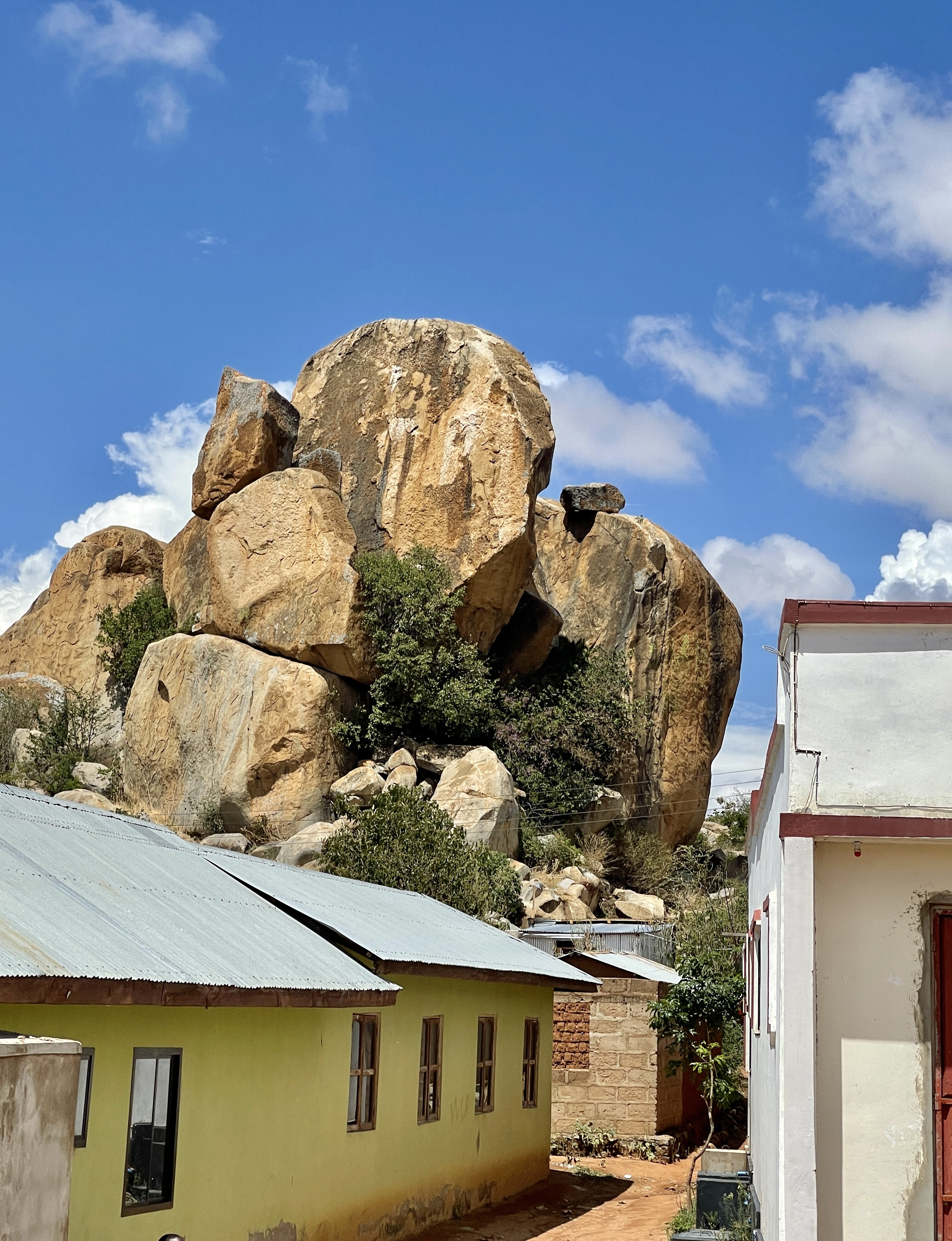
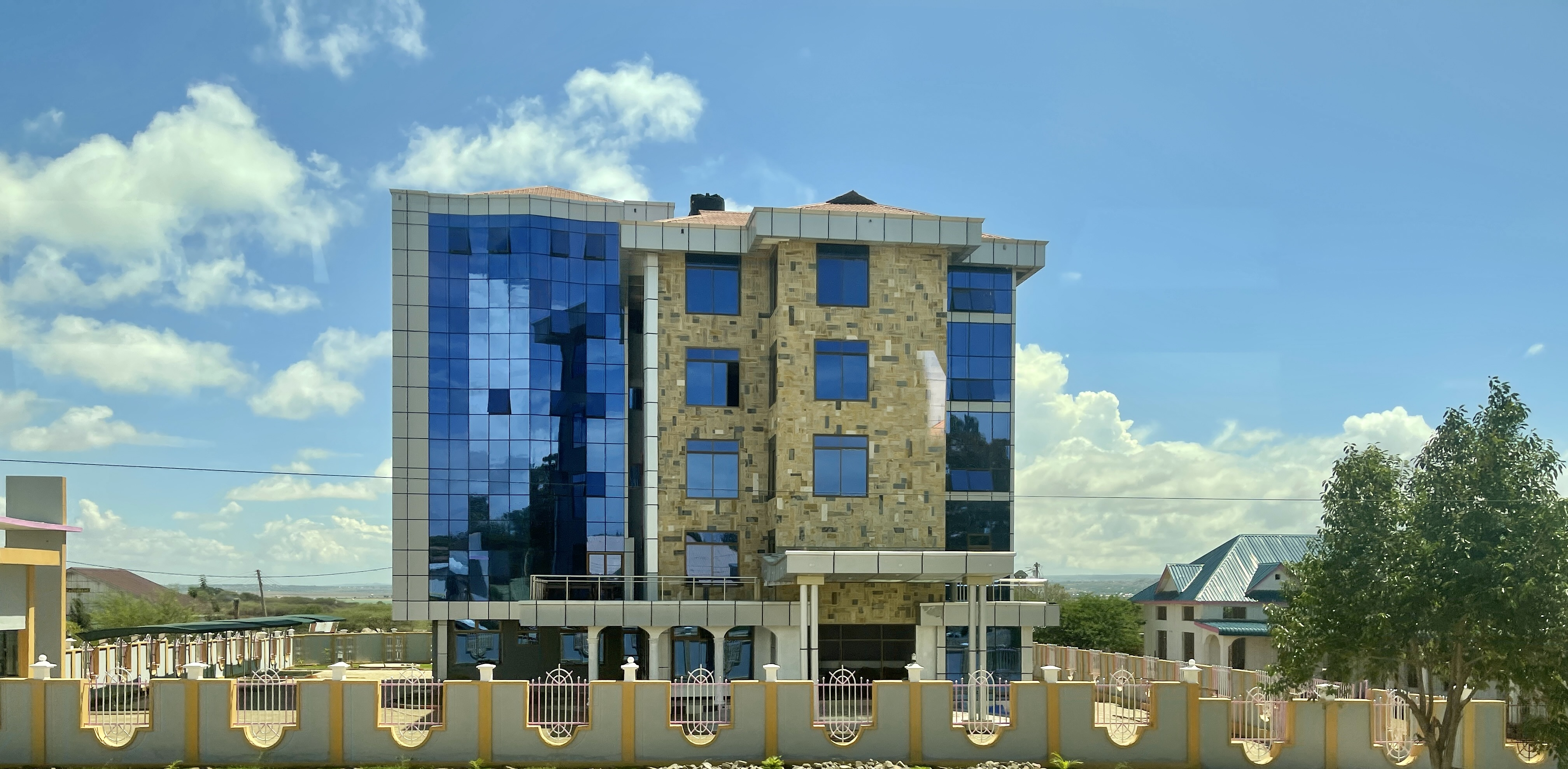
- From top to bottom: Lake Singidani, Misuni Rocks in Misuni ward, Singida & High rise in Utemeni ward, Singida Municipal
- Nickname: Tanzania's heartland
- Location in Tanzania
- Coordinates: 6°44′43.08″S 34°9′11.52″E
- Country: Tanzania
- Zone: Lake
- Region: 15 October 1963
- Capital: Singida
- Districts: List: Ikungi District; Itigi District; Iramba District; Manyoni District; Mkalama District; Singida Rural District; Singida Urban District

Government
  - Regional Commissioner: Peter Serukamba (CCM)

Area
  - Total: 49,340 km^{2} (19,050 sq mi)
  - Land: 48,345 km^{2} (18,666 sq mi)
  - Water: 95 km^{2} (37 sq mi)
  - Rank: 5th of 31
- Highest elevation (Kidagau): 1,816 m (5,958 ft)

Population (2022)
  - Total: 2,008,058
  - Rank: 16th of 31
  - Density: 41.536/km^{2} (107.58/sq mi)
- Demonym: Singidan

Ethnic groups
  - Settler: Swahili
  - Native: Nyaturu, Iramba, Isanzu, Datooga, Kimbu & Nyamwezi
- Time zone: UTC+3 (EAT)
- Postcode: 43xxx
- Area code: 026
- ISO 3166 code: TZ-23
- HDI (2018): 0.548 low· 12th of 25
- Website: Official website
- Symbols of Tanzania
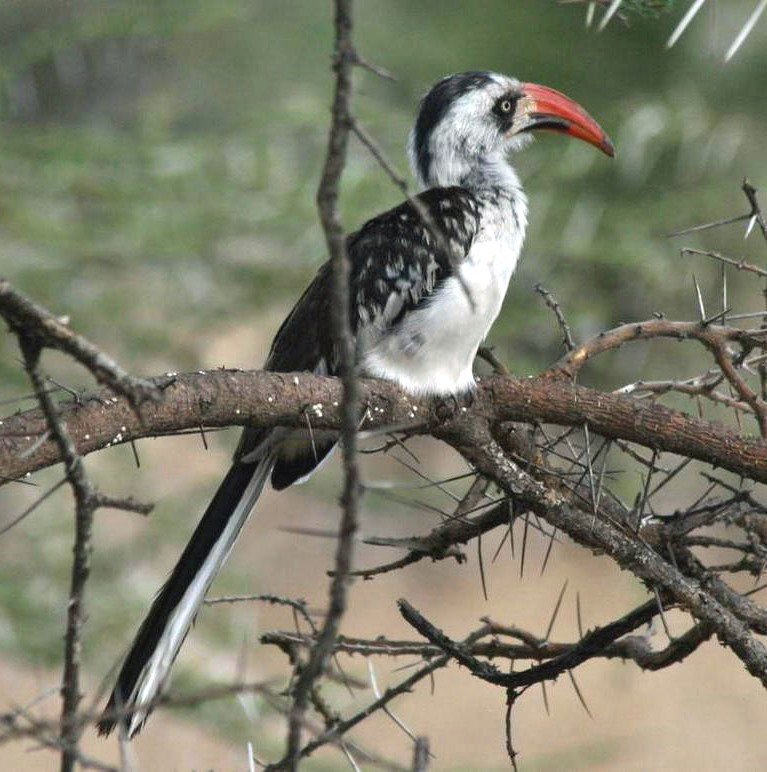
- Bird: Tanzanian red-billed hornbill

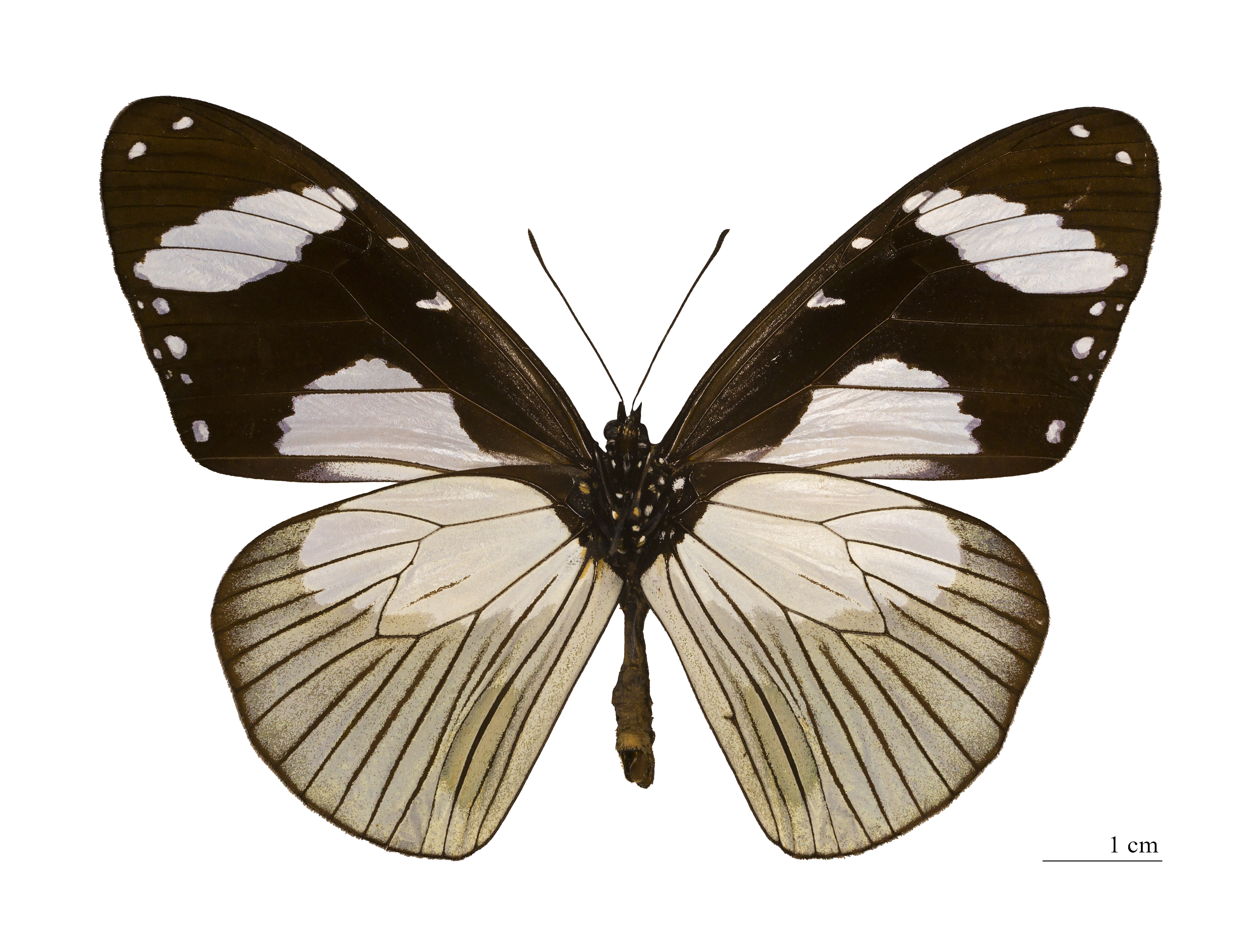
- Butterfly: Amauris niavius

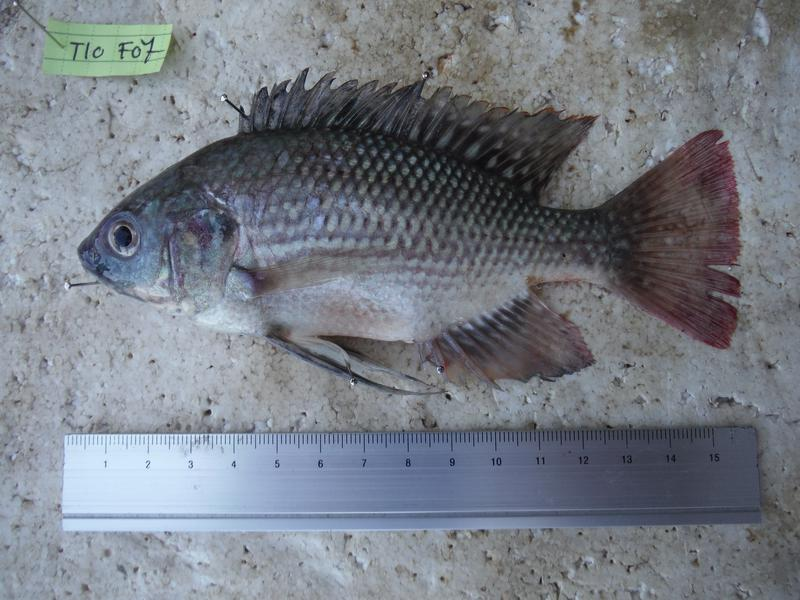
- Fish: Singida tilapia

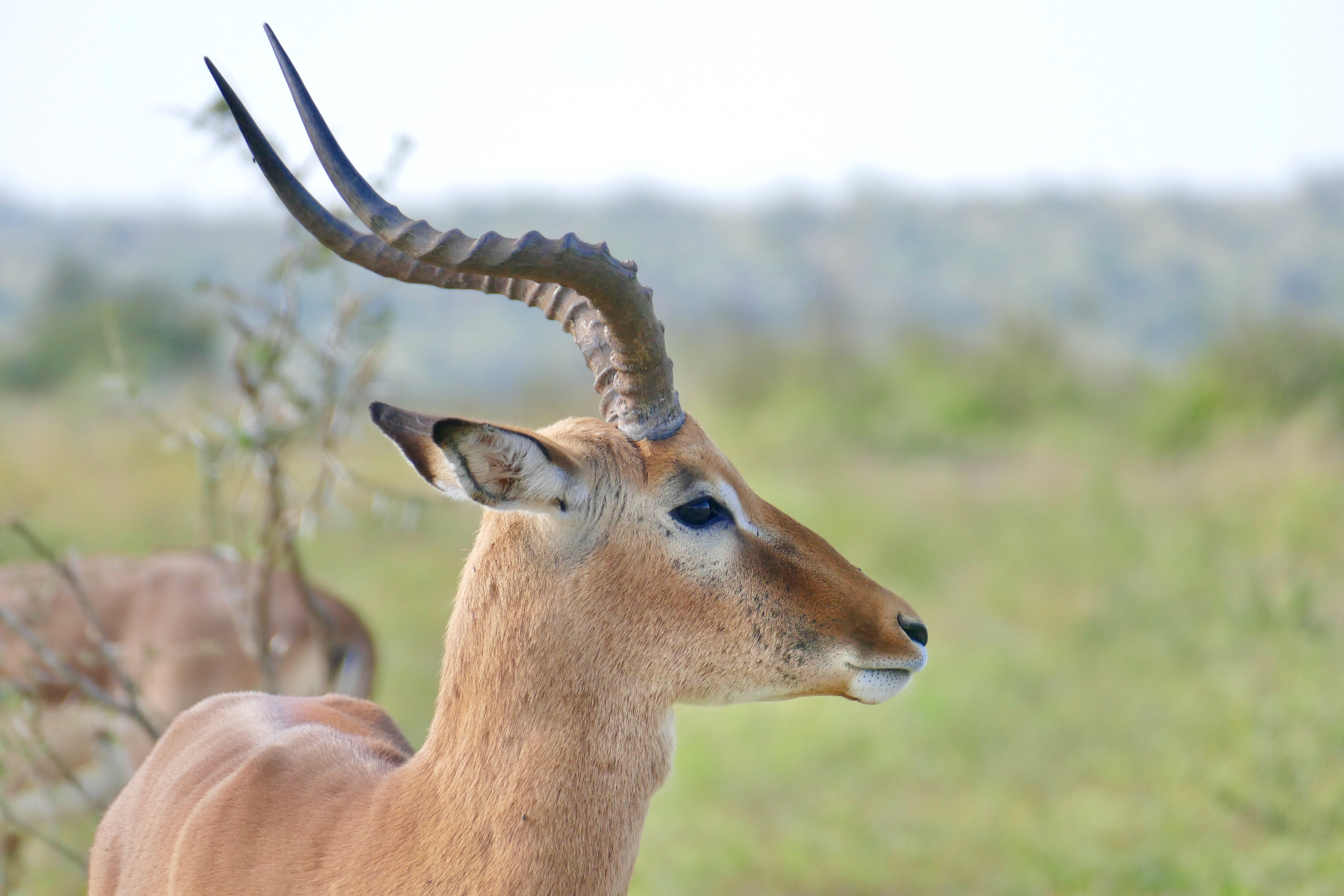
- Mammal: Impala

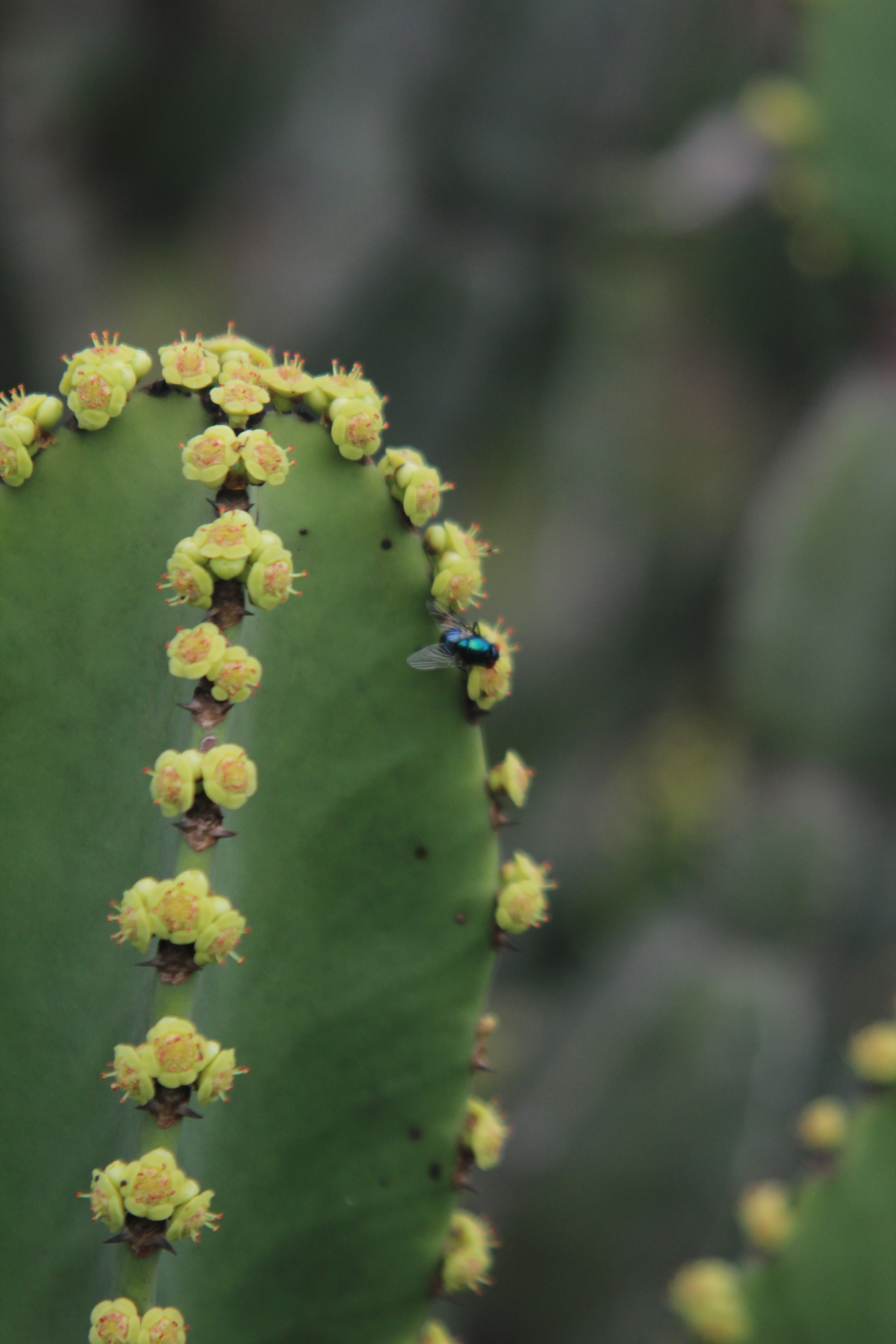
- Tree: Candelabra

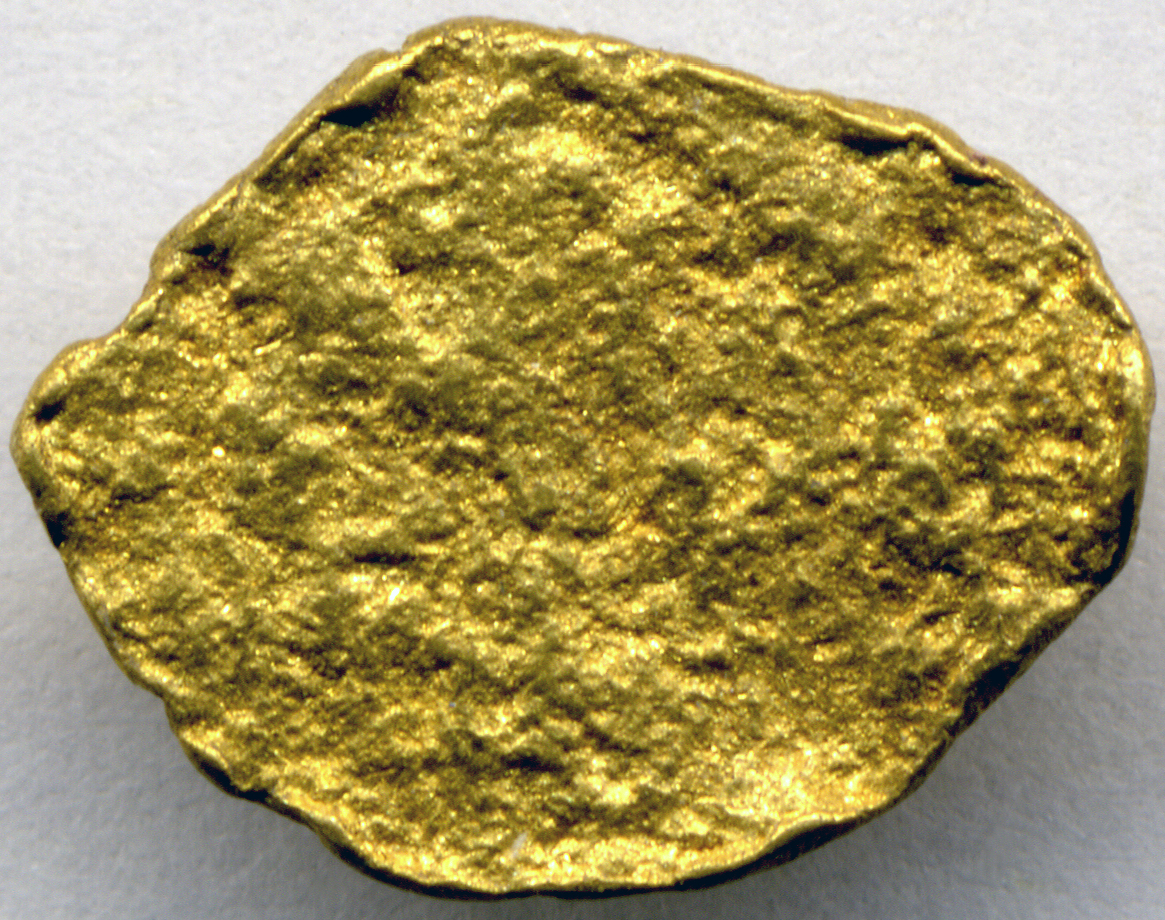
- Mineral: Gold

Singida Region (Swahili: Mkoa wa Singida) is one of Tanzania's 31 administrative regions. It covers a land area of 49,340 km^{2} (19,050 sq mi), comparable in size to the nation of Slovakia. The region is bordered to the north by Shinyanga Region, Simiyu Region and Arusha Region, to the northeast by Manyara Region, to the east by Dodoma Region, to the southeast by Iringa Region, to the southwest by Mbeya Region and to the west by Tabora Region. The regional capital is the municipality of Singida. According to the 2022 national census, the region had a population of 2,008,058.

== Geography ==
Singida Region is located below the equator between latitudes 3052’ and 7034’. Longitudinally the region is situated between 33027’ and 350 26’ east of Greenwich. To the north, it shares borders with Shinyanga Region; Arusha, Manyara and on the east borders Dodoma. To the south it shares borders with Iringa and Mbeya while on the west there is Tabora Region.

Singida Region has a total surface area of 49,438 km^{2}, out of which 95.5 km^{2} or 0.19 percent are covered by water bodies of Lake Eyasi, Kitangiri, Singidani, Kindai, Munang and Balengida. The remaining 49,342.5 km^{2} is land area. It is the 5th largest in size and occupies about 5.6 percent of mainland Tanzania's total area of 881,289 km^{2}. Manyoni District Council (57.9%) is the largest district in the Singida Region, followed by Ikungi District Council (14.9%), Iramba District, Singida District Council, Mkalama District Council, and Singida Municipality at the tail end.

=== Climate ===
The area is a portion of Tanzania's semi-arid central region, which has an unpredictable rainfall pattern, brief rainy seasons, and a fairly severe drought once every four years. There are significant geographic and seasonal variations in the annual total rainfall, which ranges from 500 mm to 800 mm. There are two seasons: the lengthy dry season from April/May to November and the brief rainy season from December to March (or occasionally up to April).

In the south-west of Manyoni District near Rungwa and along the escarpment at Kiomboi in Iramba District, where long-term mean annual rainfall surpasses 800 mm, respectively, are where Singida Region is wettest. Over a sizable portion of the Iramba and Singida districts, the mean annual rainfall falls between 600 mm and 800 mm. The driest section of the region, where the mean annual rainfall is less than 550 mm, is located on the eastern side of Manyoni District, close to the Bahi Swamp and the Rift Valley depression of Mgori and Shelui divisions. The average annual rainfall in the region is 700 mm.

The temperatures in the region vary according to altitude but generally range from about 15 °C in July to 30 °C during the month of October. Moreover, temperature differences are observed between day and night and may be very high, with hot afternoons going up to 35 °C and chilly nights going down to 10 °C.

The direction of the winds is determined by the monsoon season; they are north-easterly from November to March and south-easterly the rest of the year (dry season). The region is typically semi-arid from May to October because of the typically dry breezes in the area. The climatic influence of strong winds on moisture losses and consequent desertification is highlighted by the fact that maximal wind speeds occur with the time of greatest water scarcity.

=== Geology ===
The Wembere Steppe and the Bahi Swamp are frequently completely covered in alluviums, which are two main superficial geological deposits in the Singida Region. Alluviums are composed of sandy soil and clay which can be found in drainage depressions of all sizes and along watercourses. These alluvial deposits center regions share a coating of black dirt, or "mbuga," on the surface.

This clay has a high degree of flexibility and responds to variations in moisture content by clearly shrinking and swelling. Sandy colluvial or slope wash materials, created from the neighborhood's basement rocks, surround the "mbuga." Under shallow "mbuga," banded conglomerate limestone and, less commonly, silica are frequently formed. The second deposit is of Cainozoic consisting of cemented sand, literate and sandstone occupying only a very small proportion of the region.

=== Topography ===
The Singida Region is located in the northern portion of Tanzania's central plateau, which rises to elevations of 1,200 to 1,500 meters above sea level. A significant scarp that can reach heights of 180 meters, which is the eastern portion of the Great Rift Valley, surrounds the area on all sides with the exception of the south-eastern border. Massive outcrops or rocky peaks made of granite and metamorphic rocks are a notable aspect of the land escarpment in the Iramba and Singida areas. These outcrops, often referred to as inselbergs, are the remains of old land surfaces that have been eroded to create a vast, gently sloping peneplain in the nearby areas.

=== Drainage basins ===
The following are the fundamental drainage systems in the Singida Region: The only permanent river in the area is Sibiti, which originates in the Mkalama District and empties into Lake Kitangiri.

Ndurumo, Mpura, Kisukwani, and Wembere rivers originate in the Iramba District and flow north and northwest into Lake Kitangiri and the Eyasi Basin. Ponde and Bubu rivers originate in the Ikungi district and flow into the Bahi Swamp, which stretches across the Rift Valley's floor into the Dodoma Region.

Njombe River receives input from other rivers before joining Great Ruaha River and emptying into the Indian Ocean. The Wembere Plain or wetland is drained by rivers in the Ikungi District. Internal drainage affects a large portion of the plateau, creating salty and alkaline lakes including Singidani, Kindai, and Balengida Singida.

=== Flora ===
Bush or thickets in the uplands are examples of the vegetation that can be found there. Wetland vegetation is another thing, and it combines grassland with trees. In the Iramba and Central Singida districts (Ilongero/Mgori), bushland vegetation predominates. Parts of Ikungi District (Isuna, Ikungi, northern Manyoni, the northeastern portion of Itigi, and parts of Makanda) are covered in an impenetrable dense deciduous thicket of multisteamed shrubs known as "Itigi thickets." In areas of woodland grassland and on the edge of marsh vegetation, wetland vegetation is found in wetter "mbuga" that are inevitably inundated for extended periods during the wet season. Kintinku, Muhalala, and Saranda in Manyoni's northeast and Manyoni's southeast both have this type of vegetation.

== Economy ==
About 90% of the population in Singida Region is employed in the agricultural industry, which dominates the region's economy. The majority of the region's monetary revenue comes from agriculture, primarily from the production of maize, sweet potatoes, paddy, sorghum, peanut, cotton, sunflower, cashew nuts, and cassava. Next to agriculture, the livestock industry—which includes the poultry industry—plays a key role in the local economy.

=== Agriculture ===
In the Singida Region, the main food crops are maize, sweet potatoes, paddy, sorghum, and cassava. The primary food crop planted in the area is maize, which accounts for 45.9% of the cumulative annual average area under food crop cultivation. Sorghum is the next-largest crop, coming in at 23.5%, followed by sweet potatoes (14.0%) and finger millet (11.1%). Paddy (2.2%) and cassava (2.0%) were the other food crops grown. Three years, from 2016–17 to 2018–19, saw the region harvest an average of 595,530.8 metric tonnes of food crops. The best year was 2017–2018, when the region produced a record–setting total of 708,838.4 metric tonnes of all crops.

With an average annual output of 256,915.9 metric tonnes, maize is the primary food crop in the area, accounting for 43.1% of the average annual production of food crops. Sorghum (21.4%), sweet potatoes (15.6%), finger millet (9.1%), paddy (5.6%), cassava (3.8%), and pearl millet (1.5%) are the next most common grains.

In many of the communities in the area, livestock is a significant source of revenue and defines the economic and social standing of the home. At current market values, the regional Gross Domestic Product (GDP) of Singida rose from approximately TZS 1.2 trillion in 2012 to approximately TZS 2.42 trillion in 2018. At current market values, the regional GDP per capita climbed from TZS 872,866 in 2012 to TZS 1,500,190 in 2018.

==== Cash crops ====
Cash crops in the area occupied an average yearly area of 210,302.0 hectares from the 2016/17 crop season to the 2018/19 crop season. Sunflower, cotton, groundnuts, onions, simsim, finger millet, and lentils are some of the most important cash crops. Sunflower accounted for the majority of the land used for growing cash crops, accounting for an average of 108,629.5 hectares per year, followed by ground nuts with 23,319.5 hectares (11.1%) and other crops.

Three years, from 2016–17 to 2018–19, saw Singida Region harvest a total of 407,911.5 metric tonnes of cash crops, setting a record. The best year was 2018–19, with a cumulative annual average of 274,115.4 metric tonnes. Sunflower is the major cash crop in the area, producing an average of 133,869.5 metric tonnes annually, accounting for 48.8% of the average annual production of food crops in the region. Onion (30.19%), cowpeas (6.7%), groundnuts (6.2%), cotton (2.4%), simsim (1.8%), Kartamu (1.4%), dengu (1.2%), sugar cane (0.3%), tobacco (0.1%), and cashewnut (0.1%) are the next-highest commodities.

8,977 hectares in the Singida Region could be used for irrigation. There are currently just 2,531 hectares of land that are irrigated, or 28.2 percent, of the total area. Paddy, maize, and horticultural crops, primarily tomatoes, onions, cabbages, egg plants, watermelons, and capsicums, are among the crops irrigated.

==== Sunflowers ====
With a cumulative annual average production of 133,869.5 tonnes from 2016/17 to 2018/19, sunflowers were the top cash crop in the area. The largest producer in the area was Singida District, Council, which contributed 24.8 percent of the total tonnage of sunflower gathered in the area. Ikungi District Council came in second with 16.5%, followed by Mkalama District Council with 16.5%, Manyoni District Council with 10.4%, and Singida Municipality with 2.3%. Iramba District Council came in second with 23.5%.

==== Onions ====
Onion output from 2016/17 to 2018/19 had a total annual average production of 84,835.1 tonnes, placing it second in terms of quantity after sunflower. The largest onion producer in the area was Mkalama District Council, which supplied 59.2% of the total tonnage of onions gathered in the area. Ikungi District Council (11.7%), Iramba District Council (8.5%), and Itigi District Council (1.3%) were in second, third, and fourth place, respectively, behind Singida District Council (19.3%).

==== Livestock ====
Singida has a large number of livestock with around 1.4 million cattle, 0.7 million goats, 0.4 million sheep, 42,00 donkeys and 1.1 million chickens. Livestock ranks 2nd as a major resource for the economy. This includes livelihood and beef export which is a major trade domestically and nationally. Other economic contributions are mining, commerce, and natural resources consisting of agro-forestry, wildlife, bee keeping and fishing. Singida has a progressive increase in the GDP income the country of Tanzania. It contributes 3% to the government of Tanzania's GDP.

The Singida Region's estimated grazing land in 2018 was 403,087 hectares, although only 362,156 hectares of that area was actually utilised for grazing. Many steps have been done to encourage pastoralists to embrace contemporary methods of livestock management. In 2018, the region has 17 veterinary clinics and 88 veterinary diagnostic imaging centers, of which roughly 25 diagnostic imaging centers were operational. By 2018, there were 31 livestock markets/auctions, 43 charcoal dams, 8 hide and skin sheds, 12 crushes, and 12 abattoirs in the area. In 2019, there were 86 slaughter slabs in the area.

According to estimates, 594,280 animals (including chickens 437,884, pigs 19,333, sheep 31,535, dairy cattle 104, goats 51,326 and indigenous cattle 54,098 were sold in 2018). In 2018, 110,252 hides and skins (43,360 cattle hides, 54,034 goat skins, and 12,858 sheep skins) were marked. In 2018, approximately 1,410,293 liters of milk were produced.

Ikungi District Council had the most share (34.02%; 417,746) of the total cattle population in the area at the council level. Iramba District Council came in second at 15.56 percent (190,989), followed by Singida District Council (14.53%; 178,426), Manyoni District (Council 13.36%; 164,081), Mkalama District Council (10.61%; 130,289), and Itigi District Council (8.80%; 108,020), whereas Singida Municipal Council had the lowest share of cattle population in Singida Region at 3.11 percent.

Goats were the most prevalent animal in the Ikungi District Council, where they made up 32.29 percent of the total population. Manyoni District Council came in second with 16.22 percent, followed by Iramba District Council (15.16 percent), Itigi District Council (7.48 percent), Singida Municipal Council (5.32%), Singida District Council (10.70 percent), and Mkalama District Council (12.83 percent).

Poultry farming is an important aspect of life for both rural and urban residents, and it makes a big difference in reducing poverty and enhancing food security. 2,632,584 native chickens made up the Singida Region's chicken population. The largest number was recorded by the Ikungi District Council (913,137), which was followed by the Iramba District Council (718,000), the Singida District Council (371,878), the Mkalama District Council (308,188), and the Manyoni District Council (205,085). The Itigi District (62,403) and the Singida Municipal Council (53,893) only recorded a small number.

The number of sheep in the Ikungi District Council was highest (28%; 79,945), followed by the Iramba District Council (46,921; 16.4%), Manyoni District Council (45,106; 15.8%), Mkalama District Council (44,673; 15.7%), Singida District Council (41,183; 14.4%), Singida Municipal (13,966; 4.9%), and Itigi District Council (13,637; 4.8%).

Pigs (15,678) were one of the animals contributing to the life of urban residents in the Singida Region in 2019. Iramba District Council had the highest percentage of pigs in the area (5,896; 37.6%), followed by Mkalama District Council (3,606; 23%), and Singida District had the lowest percentage (373; 2.4%).

=== Fishing ===
Lake Kitangiri in the Iramba District is the primary site for fishing activity in the area. Additionally, Tulya Ward in Singida DC and Mpambala ard in Mkalama DC) wards provide access to fishing resources. There are a total of 170 fishing licenses, and 274 registered fishing vessels are used by 386 fishermen to do their business. 94 fishing boats that are not registered are also present. About 193.2 tonnes of fish (mostly Singida tilapia) were caught in 2015, totaling TZS 474,940,000.

=== Industry ===
1 large industry, 10 medium-scale industries, 309 minor industries, and 1,485 micro-scale industries made up the 1,805 industries in the Singida Region in 2019. One of the county's regions, Singida, depends on the processing of sunflower oil for its industrial sector. 1 major, 3 medium, and 115 small of the region's 119 sunflower processing facilities rely on locally and regionally supplied raw materials. The large-scale Mount Meru Millers sunflower refinery is capable of generating 182,500 metric tonnes annually. The combined annual processing capacity of the three medium-sized facilities is 89,790 metric tonnes of sunflower. The 115 small factories have a yearly processing capacity of 162,435 metric tonnes. Singida Region has 11 small, privately owned factories that process leather and one medium-sized business that processes leather for the cattle industry.

There are 6,113 licensed dealers among the 7,851 state-recognized traders in the region. To date, SIDO, Measurement Agency, and TPSF have all provided business training to a total of 4,548 merchants at various times. Additionally, around 1,546 locals have received crop processing training.

=== Mining ===
There are 46 different locations where different sorts of mineral resources can be found in the Singida Region. Six categories are used to classify the different types of minerals that are readily accessible, including: I metallic minerals (gold, copper, iron, titanium); (ii) energy (uranium); (iii) gemstones (zircon, quarts, amethyst, and garnets); (iv) Kimberlitic diamonds; (v) industrial (gypsum salt and red soil); and (vi) building materials (rocks, gravel, pebbles, stones Only seven regions of the 46 mineral resources are being mined on a modest basis. Most small-scale miners drill for these seven minerals, and regional mining officials oversee this industry's management. A business by the name of Shinta is now opening a central gold mine in the area.

Gypsum output was 5,290.83 metric tonnes worth TZS 411.3 million, gold production was 31,383.26 grams for TZS 2.089 billion, and production of construction minerals was 34,102.50 metric tonnes worth TZS 125.5 million, for a total revenue of TZS 2.6 billion. For 2016–17, a total of 115.05 million TZS worth of square footage was authorized, of which 83.6 million TZS were allotted for gold mining, 12.4 million TZS for gypsum mining, and 19.02 million TZS for construction minerals.

=== Infrastructure ===
A 220-KV electricity system connecting the Singida Region to the region to the nationwide electrical grid. Wind energy plans are still in the works. Singida has a railway station on a branch off the Central Railway of Tanzanian Railways, although it is currently not working. It is a branch terminal. The railway from Singida joins the Central line at Manyoni. Most roads in Singida Region are made of tarmacs, with good quality. As of 2012 a new asphalt road was completed between Singida and Dodoma. An asphalt road was also built between Singida and Mwanza.< Also roads within the district are of good condition, some of them made of tarmacs and other seasonal roads. Singida Airstrip is a public airstrip located west of the town (ICAO: HTSD).

=== Nature, Reserves and Tourism ===
Tanzania's forestry strategy places a strong emphasis on assisting local populations in protecting their land. Out of the 441 communities in the Singida Region, 230 have local natural forest reserves totaling 520,325.48 hectares. As a result, there are village natural forest reserves in around fifty percent (50%) of the communities in the Singida Region. The 39,361-hectare Mgori forest reserve serves as an illustration of a good forest reserve. Nalogwa (36 ha), Mwighaji (346.22 ha), Munkhola (1,393.62 ha), Mughamo (462.44 ha), and Sombi are other forest reserves (50 ha).

Mgori Forest Reserve: Five communities, Mughunga, Unyampanda, Nduamughanga, Pohama, and Ngimu, own and administer the 39,361 acres Mgori Forest Reserve. The forest is home to a variety of animals and trees. The Amarula is a rare species of plant that makes edible fruits. Additionally, beekeeping is practiced in this woodland.

Three game reserves, totaling 15,836 square kilometers, are situated in the Manyoni District. These are Muhesi Game Reserve, Kizigo Game Reserve, and Rungwa Game Reserve, each covering 9,000 square kilometers (2,836 km^{2}). The southern boundary of these reserves is shared with Ruaha National Park. These game reserves are home to a vast range of species, including elephants, buffalo, lions, leopards, giraffes, impala, zebra, baboons, monkeys, and a large number of different birds.

Additionally, there are 12 open game regions (game-controlled areas) in the territory, totaling around 27,206 square kilometers. These regions are Wembere Plains, Endasiku in Iramba District, Chaya Game Controlled Area in Manyoni, Minyughe, Mgori, Isuna, Mwaru, and Nduamghanga in Singida District. Cultural attractions include: rock paintings can be seen in a number of locations in the area, including Mwakiteu in Ilongero, Mangua, and Misughaa in Singida District. Also Kisana Wangu rock paintings. In Msule Village, Sambaru in Singida District, and Nkhonkilangi Village in Iramba District, hot springs may be found. In Singida city, the Singida Regional Museum is under Tanzania's Open University and available to the public.

German Boma in Kilimatinde: The Boma is thought to have been built between 1880 and 1890. Before becoming a hospital, this structure was built during the German colonial era for military and administrative uses. Hewani, a nearby observation point from where one may see the Rift Valley in its entirety, is close by. The oldest hospital in Tanzania's Mainland is Kilimatinde. There are a number of graves of young German troops from the early 1900s.

== Population ==
The first peoples in Singida Region are the Bantu ethnic group of this region is known as the Turu people, it is the most prominent ethnic group in the region as they currently have a world population of over 1,000,000 members with most of them residing in the Singida Region. The Turu also rely heavily on grain production for the purposes of acquiring cattle, which is a very important commodity to the Turu. They primarily produce crops like uwele, maize and matama and The Turu rely on wives in the community to harvest crops and they are huge component of the Turu economy, as such bride wealth via cattle is often arranged in order to obtain a bride.

Nyamwezi people are a tribe whose ancestral home are in certain parts of Singida. This is an agricultural community producing primarily crops like sorghum, millet, and rice. The Nyamwezi have matrilineal descent groups. Ancestral worship is also integral to the Nyamwezi and they also look to high gods and spirits for guidance.

The Isanzu people are based in the Iramba district of Singida Region. The Isanzu speak a Bantu language called Kinyihanzu and the population is approximately 87,000 people. The Isanzu are also farmers of sorghum, millet, and maize. Some Isanzu are also migrant laborers in other parts of the country; and they also have matrilineal descent. Another people group is based in southern Singida Regiona are the Kimbu people.

The Datooga people also live in certain parts of northern Singida Region and as of 1996 there are approximately 100,000 Datooga people. They mainly practice Christianity but have strong adherence to traditional practices rooted in animist beliefs. This entails relying on rainmaking, and sorcery, and strong respect and deference for ancestors who are looked to for spiritual guidance. The Datooga primarily speak the language Datooga and are a formerly nomadic people, now agriculturists and farm crops like maize, beans and millet. This group also practice polygamy and rank wives based on order of marriage.

=== Demographics ===
Since 2003, there has been a considerable population increase in the Singida Region. With a population growth rate of 2.3 percent, the region's population expanded from 1,086,748 people in 2002 to 1,370,637 people in 2012. The estimated population in 2020 is 1,705,182.

In 2012, there were 255,613 homes in the Singida Region, of which 218,621 (86%) were located in rural regions and 218,621 (14%), in urban areas. In the Singida Region, women were in charge of 32% of families. There were 5.3 people living in each home. Compared to urban households, which on average had 4.4 people per household, rural households had 5.4 people. In female-headed homes, there were 8.3 people on average per household, as opposed to 3.8 in male-headed households.

Singida Region's average population density in 2012 was 28 people per square kilometer, which was lower than Tanzania's mainland's average density of 49 people per square kilometer. This demonstrates that there is no land pressure in the area.

Census	Population
1978	613,949
1988	792,387
2002	1,086,748
2012	1,370,637
2022	2,008,058

== Politics ==
The main political party representing the Tanzanian government is CCM (Chama Cha Mapinduzi), which the presidents have five year terms and can be reelected once. Singida Region is run by a town council led by a regional commissioner, Hon. Dr. B. Mahenge. The currently Member of the Parliament representing Singida is Hon. Mussa Sima.

== Administrative divisions ==
=== Districts ===
Singida Region is divided into six districts, each administered by a council (note: the regions changed between the 2002 census and the 2012 census so the figures are not directly comparable):

Districts of Singida Region
Map with main roads in green	District	Population (2012)	Population (2002)
	Iramba District	236,282	368,131
	Ikungi District	272,959	-
	Manyoni District	296,763	205,423
	Mkalama District	188,733	-
	Singida District	225,521	401,850
	Singida Municipality	150,379	115,354
	Itigi District^{*}		
Total		1,370,637	1,090,758

Note:

^{*} - formerly part of Manyoni District until 2015

== Health and Education ==
=== Health ===
In most cases, Singida positively exceeds national standards as far as infant mortality, health unit ratio to population, and maternal mortality rate. Singida Region had 9 hospitals, 18 health centres and 206 dispensaries in 2018.

=== Education ===
In the Singida Region, there were 555 primary schools, and more than ninety-five percent (95.5%) of them were publicly owned. In contrast, 25 elementary schools were owned by the private sector in 2020. In the same time frame, 22 of the 164 secondary schools in the Singida Region were privately owned, making up 86.6 percent of all secondary schools. The Open University of Tanzania (OUT) and the Tanzania Institute of Accountancy are the only two universities with a physical presence in the area. Additionally, there are technical colleges, colleges for teachers, VETA-registered training facilities, and colleges for folk development (FDC).

== Notable Persons from Singida Region ==
- Mohammed Dewji, billionaire, richest man in Tanzania
- Restituta Joseph, athlete
- Zakia Mrisho Mohamed, athlete, women's national record in 5000m
- Michael John Lema, footballer playing for Austria
- Tundu Lissu, lawyer and politician
- January Makamba, politician
- Aisha Masaka,footballer
- Anna Mghwira, politician
- Mwigulu Nchemba, politician
- Samson Ramadhani, athlete
- Jux, singer

== See also ==
- Transport in Tanzania
- Railway stations in Tanzania
