= List of bridges in Tanzania =

Location of Tanzania

List of bridges in Tanzania is a partial list of bridges in Tanzania. As of December 2011, the country has 4,880 bridges.

== Major bridges ==
	Name	Span	Length	Type	Carries Crosses	Opened	Location	Province	Ref.
1	Nyerere Bridge	200 m (660 ft)	680 m (2,230 ft)	Cable-stayed; Concrete box girder deck, concrete pylons 40+60+200+60+40	Road bridge Kurasini estuary	2016	Dar es Salaam; 6°51′33.2″S 39°17′58.5″E	Dar es Salaam Region	
2	Tanzanite Bridge	125 m (410 ft)(x4)	1,030 m (3,380 ft)	Extradosed; Concrete box girder deck, 5 concrete pylons 85+4x125+85	Road bridge Msimbazi delta	2022	Dar es Salaam; 6°47′34.5″S 39°17′07.3″E	Dar es Salaam Region	

Image	Bridge	Length	Locale	Region	Opened
	Kirumi Bridge	223 metres (732 ft)		Mara	1985
	Kyaka Bridge		Kyaka	Kagera	1992
	Mkapa Bridge	970 metres (3,180 ft)	Ikwiriri	Pwani	2003
	New Ruvu Bridge	135 metres (443 ft)		Coast	2009
	Selander Bridge	085 metres (279 ft)	Oyster Bay	Dar es Salaam	1980s
	Wami Bridge	088 metres (289 ft)		Coast	1959

=== International bridges ===
Image	Bridge	Length	Locale	Region	Opened
	Rusumo Bridge	100 metres (330 ft)		Kagera	1972
	Songwe Bridge	050 metres (160 ft)		Mbeya	1988
	Unity Bridge	720 metres (2,360 ft)		Mtwara	2010

=== Other bridges ===
Bridge	Length	Locale	Region	Opening in
Kikwete Bridge	275 metres (902 ft)	Uvinza	Kigoma	2013
Kilombero Bridge	384 metres (1,260 ft)	Ifakara	Morogoro	2014
Mbutu Bridge	046 metres (151 ft)	Igunga	Tabora	2013
Rusumo International Bridge	080 metres (260 ft)		Kagera	2014
Sibiti Bridge	082 metres (269 ft)	Iramba	Singida	2014
Kijazi Interchange	702 metres (2,303 ft)	Ubungo	Dar es Salaam	2020
Mfugale Flyover	425 metres (1,394 ft)		Dar es Salaam	2018
Selander Flyover	1,030 metres (3,380 ft)	Sea View	Dar es Salaam	2021

== See also ==
- Transport in Tanzania
- Roads in Tanzania
- Rail transport in Tanzania
- Geography of Tanzania
- List of rivers of Tanzania
