= Iramba District =

- District
- Iramba District's location within Singida Region.
- Coordinates: 04°22′S 34°12′E
- Country: Tanzania
- Region: Singida Region

Area
  - Total: 4,520 km^{2} (1,750 sq mi)

Population (2022)
  - Total: 328,912
  - Density: 72.8/km^{2} (188/sq mi)

Iramba is one of the six districts of the Singida Region of central Tanzania. It is bordered to the Northwest by the Shinyanga Region, to the North by Simiyu Region, to the east by the Mkalama District, to the South by Ikungi District and to the West by the Tabora Region. Its administrative seat is the town of Kiomboi.

According to the 2012 Tanzania National Census, the population of the new Iramba District was 236,282.

According to the 2022 Tanzania National Census, the population of the Iramba District was 328,912.

== Language ==
The natives of the Iramba district are called 'Wanyiramba'(pl., singular: 'Mnyiramba'). Their mother tongue is Kinyiramba, though the majority can also speak Swahili.

== Wards 2012 ==
Ward	Population	Population - Male	Population - Female	Number of Households	Average Household Size
Urughu	13,380	6,566	6,814	1,840	7.3
Mtekente	16,973	8,396	8,577	2,603	6.5
Mtoa	19,724	9,738	9,986	3,237	6.1
Mgongo	13,041	6,377	6,664	2,013	6.5
Shelui	14,933	7,417	7,516	2,903	5.1
Ntwike	16,977	8,461	8,516	3,154	5.4
Tulya	8,265	4,370	3,895	1,607	5.1
Kidaru	9,727	4,849	4,878	1,559	6.2
Kisiriri	10,686	5,294	5,392	2,335	4.6
Kiomboi	25,375	12,270	13,105	5,598	4.5
Kinampanda	14,870	7,308	7,562	2,960	5
Ulemo	17,174	8,407	8,767	3,584	4.8
Kyengege	7,845	3,902	3,943	1,544	5.1
Ndago	14,453	7,195	7,258	2,953	4.9
Mbelekese	12,678	6,364	6,314	2,272	5.6
Kaselya	9,801	4,849	4,952	1,755	5.6
Ndulungu	10,380	5,234	5,146	1,821	5.7

== Wards 2002 ==
The Iramba District was administratively divided into 34 wards:

- Gumanga
- Ibaga
- Iguguno
- Ilunda
- Javane
- Kaselya
- Kengege
- Kidaru
- Kimpunda
- Kinampanda
- Kinyangiri
- Kiomboi
- Kirondatal
- Kisana
- Kisiriri
- Kyengege
- Mbelekese
- Mpambala
- Msingi (English meaning: Primary or Foundation)
- Mtekente
- Mtoa
- Mwanga
- Mwangeza
- Ndago
- Nduguti
- Nkinto
- Ntwike
- Shati
- Shelui
- Timbwa
- Tulya
- Tumili
- Ulemo
- Urughu
- Urugu
- Usure
- Uwanza

== Sources ==
- Iramba District Homepage for the 2002 Tanzania National Census
- Tanzanian Government Directory Database
