= Nilamba =

Nilamba may refer to:

- Nilamba people, an ethnic and linguistic group based in the Shinyanga Region, Tanzania
- Nilamba language, a Bantu language spoken in the Shinyanga Region, Tanzania
