= Tanzanite Bridge =

Bridge in Dar es Salaam, Tanzania

Tanzanite Bridge Daraja la Tanzanite (Swahili)
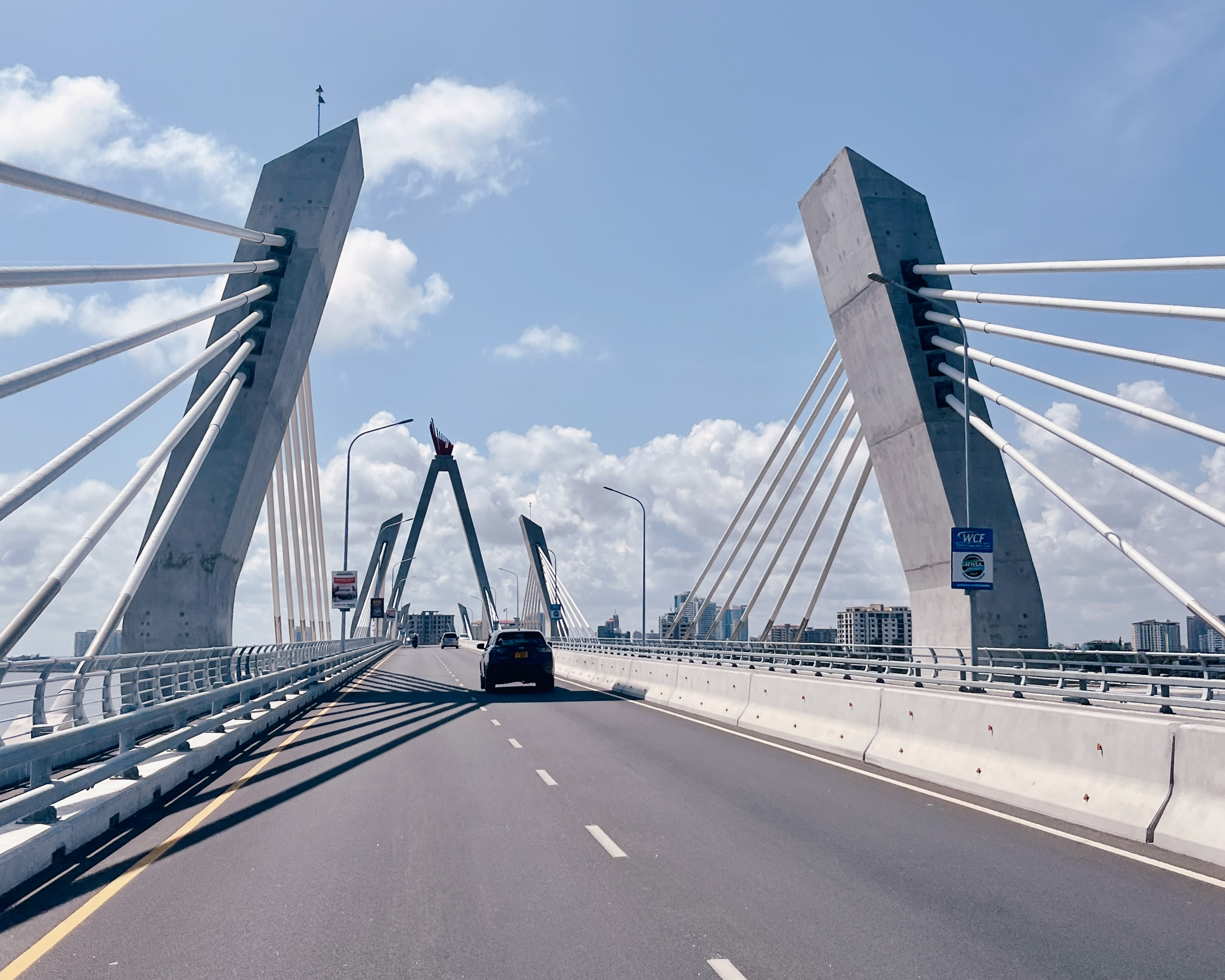
- Coordinates: 6°47′31″S 39°17′7″E
- Carries: 4 lane dual carriageway
- Crosses: Msimbazi Delta
- Locale: Dar es Salaam, Tanzania
- Other name: New Selander Bridge
- Owner: Government of Tanzania

Characteristics
- Total length: 1.03 kilometres (0.64 mi)
- Width: 20.5 metres (67 ft)

History
- Constructed by: GS Engineering & Construction
- Opened: 1 February 2022

Location
- Interactive map of Tanzanite Bridge

The Tanzanite Bridge (Swahili: Daraja la Tanzanite), formerly known as the New Selander Bridge (Daraja jipya la Selander), is a hybrid cable-stayed-girder bridge crossing the Msimbazi Delta in Dar es Salaam, Tanzania. The bridge was conceived to relieve congestion on the original Selander Bridge. Construction on the Tanzanite Bridge began in 2018, carried out by GS Engineering & Construction. It was officially opened on 1 February 2022.

== Description ==
The Tanzanite Bridge connects the neighbourhood of Oyster Bay on the Msasani Peninsula to the city centre or Dar es Salaam, where it joins Barack Obama Drive near the Aga Khan Hospital. The 20.5 m (67 ft) wide bridge carries four lanes of traffic and pedestrian walkways. It has traits of a cable-stayed bridge and a girder bridge, with a designed capacity of 55,000 vehicles per day. It is 1.03 km (0.64 mi) long with a 670 m (2,200 ft) main span. It has 254 foundation piles and 16 bridge piers. Its piers have a maximum spacing of 125 m (410 ft).

== History ==
A bridge to relieve congestion on the Selander Bridge was proposed in a 2008 transportation policy master plan jointly created by the Dar es Salaam City Council and the Japan International Cooperation Agency. The construction of such a bridge was included in Chama Cha Mapinduzi's 2015 and 2020 election platforms. The bridge was included alongside a project to widen 5.2 km (3.2 mi) of road.

A contract for the construction of the bridge was signed between TANROADS and South Korean company GS Engineering & Construction (GSE) on 23 July 2018. A groundbreaking ceremony was held on 20 December 2018, with then-president John Magufuli laying the foundation stone. The substructure was complete by September 2021, with work on road surfacing, drainage systems, and street lights remaining. By 21 December 2021, GSE completed construction works on the bridge, with security infrastructure remaining to be installed. The bridge was officially opened on 1 February 2022.

The bridge was constructed at a cost of TSh243 billion (US$120 million), and the full project cost TSh256 billion (US$127 million). TSh216 billion (US$107 million) in funding aid was provided by the Economic Development Cooperation Fund (EDCF) through a soft loan from Korea Eximbank. It is the largest South Korean-funded development project in Africa.

President Samia Suluhu Hassan ordered Minister of Works Makame Mbarawa to remove the original Uhuru torch symbol on 24 March 2022 as part of the Tanzanite Bridge's rebranding. The bridge was closed on 2 January 2023 during the installation of the new tanzanite symbol.

The parliamentary committee on infrastructure recommended instating a toll in March 2023.

=== Incidents ===
Two people were arrested for cutting iron bars on the bridge on 2 April 2022. TANROADS installed security cameras on the bridge by May.
