= Kijazi Interchange =

Road interchange in Dar es Salaam, Tanzania

John Kijazi Interchange
- Barabara ya juu ya John Kijazi
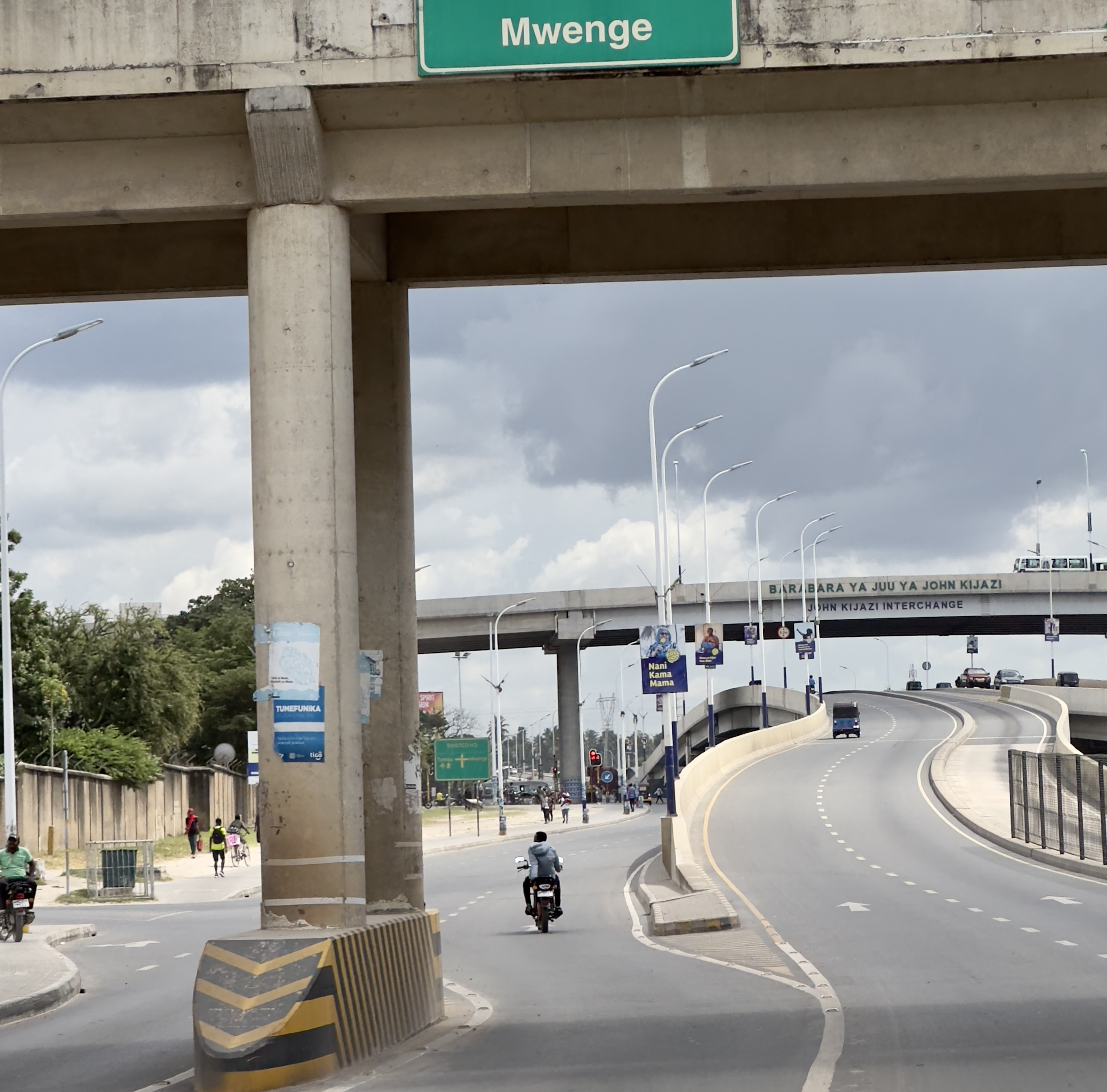
- View from the east along Morogoro Road
- Interactive map of John Kijazi Interchange

Location
- Dar es Salaam, Tanzania
- Coordinates: 6°47′33″S 39°12′29″E
- Roads at junction: Morogoro Road; Nelson Mandela Road/Sam Nujoma Road

Construction
- Type: Flyover
- Constructed: 21 March 2017
- Opened: 24 February 2021
- Maximum height: 17.5 m
- Maintained by: TANROADS

The John Kijazi Interchange (Swahili: Barabara ya juu ya John Kijazi), formerly known as the Ubungo Interchange, is a three-level road interchange in the Ubungo District of Dar es Salaam, Tanzania. It lies at Ubungo Intersection between Morogoro Road and Nelson Mandela Road–Sam Nujoma Road. Prior to the interchange's construction, Ubungo Intersection was already one of the busiest road junctions in Tanzania, and severe traffic congestion caused hours of delays.

Its two elevated levels carry six lanes of through traffic – four for mixed traffic and two bus lanes – over the intersection. The lower elevated level, carrying traffic from Morogoro Road, is a pair of 266 m (873 ft) long flyovers carrying three lanes each. The upper level is a single 702 m (2,303 ft) long bridge carrying traffic from Nelson Mandela Road–Sam Nujoma Road. Construction for the interchange began in March 2017 and completed in February 2024, with funding partly coming from the International Development Association. The structure was named after former chief secretary John Kijazi, who died in February 2021.

== Layout ==
The Kijazi interchange is a three-level interchange located in Dar es Salaam's Ubungo District. It sits at Ubungo Intersection between Morogoro Road and Nelson Mandela Road–Sam Nujoma Road. The two elevated levels host a total of six lanes: four lanes of mixed traffic and two bus lanes. The first elevated level carries through traffic for Morogoro Road. It consists of a pair of three-lane flyovers 266 m (873 ft) long. It is made of a 50 m (160 ft) long composite girder bridge central span with five- and three-span approaches from the west and east, respectively. The top level carries through traffic for Nelson Mandela Road–Sam Nujoma Road on a single 702 m (2,303 ft) long flyover. It is made of a 50 m (160 ft) long central span, with 13- and 10-span approaches from the south and north, respectively. The interchange is 17.5 m (57 ft) tall.

== History ==
=== Background ===
Dar es Salaam is a rapidly growing city, maintaining an annual population growth rate of about 5% in the 1990s and into the early 21st century. Resulting strain on its transportation infrastructure leads to severe traffic congestion. Before the interchange was built, Ubungo Intersection was already one of the busiest road junctions in Tanzania. The intersection handled over 65,000 vehicles daily by 2017, and traffic jams led to delays of three hours or more during peak hours.

In order to improve transportation infrastructure in the city, the government of Tanzania – supported by international partners such as the World Bank and Japan International Cooperation Agency – launched a series infrastructure improvement projects. These projects include the construction of grade-separated interchanges at select road junctions. The first such interchange in Dar es Salaam, the Mfugale Flyover, opened in 2018. In 2017, TANROADS launched the Dar es Salaam Urban Transportation Improvement Project (DUTIP), which was made of Phases 3 and 4 of UDART construction, institutional reforms, and the construction of an interchange at Ubungo Intersection.

=== Design and construction ===
TANROADS began inviting bids for the design of the interchange project in January 2016, and applied for a credit from the International Development Association to fund part of the wider transport improvement project. TANROADS awarded the contract to China Civil Engineering Construction Corporation (CCECC) in February 2017. The interchange was originally designed with an intersection platform on the second level for left- and right-turning traffic, served by eight two-lane ramps. The design was changed to its present configuration in 2018 by TANROADS in accordance with recommendations from CCECC due to cost and land acquisition concerns.

Then-president John Magufuli laid the foundation stone in a ceremony on 21 March 2017. In preparation for construction, 1,300 houses and public buildings were demolished that year. Under Magufuli's direction, the headquarters of TANESCO and several offices for the Ministry of Water and Irrigation were marked for demolition in November 2017. Delays to the demolition led the Tanzanian government to issue an ultimatum for the demolition's completion by 1 February 2018.

The project cost about TSh200.7 billion (US$77.6 million) and was partly funded by the International Development Association. Construction was initially expected to complete by September 2020. The interchange was partially opened to the public in July 2020 before being fully opened on 24 February 2021. On the interchange's opening, Magufuli announced that it would be named after former chief secretary John Kijazi, who died earlier in the year on 17 February.
