= Kinyangiri =

- Ward
- Location in Tanzania
- Coordinates: 4°27′S 34°37′E
- Country: Tanzania
- Zone: Central
- Elevation: 1,337 m (4,386 ft)

Population (2012)
  - Total: 13,475
- Time zone: UTC+3 (EAT)
- Area code: +255

Kinyangiri is an administrative ward in the Mkalama District of the Singida Region of Tanzania. According to the 2002 census, the ward had a total population of 18,838. According to the 2012 census, the population had decreased to 13,475.

== Historical background ==
A native tribe of Wanyiramba has been living in Kinyangiri and its surroundings long before the arrival of Germans in the 1890s who settled and established an administration in the village. During the colonial era, Kinyangiri village saw a number of new buildings and infrastructure built under the rule of the Germans, these include the rest house, primary school, court house, storage facilities, water wells and contour banks to prevent soil erosion. Later, Arabs arrived mainly from Zanzibar and Oman as businessmen, they built retails shops and traded with the local people. There are some reports that there were also businessmen from Asia as well as other tribes in Tanzania back in 1950s. At that time, the village was one of the most developed wards in Singida region with leading production of crops, food, dairy products, and timber.

== Access to Electricity ==
The village was connected to the national electric grid in 2013 enabling access to electricity. Before that, villagers depended only on electric and solar power generators to meet their electric needs. Rural Energy Agency (REA) of Tanzania is the government agent that supplies electricity at subsidized cost. As of 2021, there are more than 350 homes and houses connected to the electricity.

== Transport ==
Kinyangiri is situated about 20 km from Iguguno town which is connected to the national paved highway. An unpaved Trunk from Iguguno passes through Kinyangiri en route to Mkalama District. Regular buses run daily between Singida and Mkalama passing Kinyagiri. A paved trunk road from Singida Region runs 40 km to Iguguno which has hourly mini-buses. It normally take 2 hours to travel by bus from Singida town to Kinyangiri.

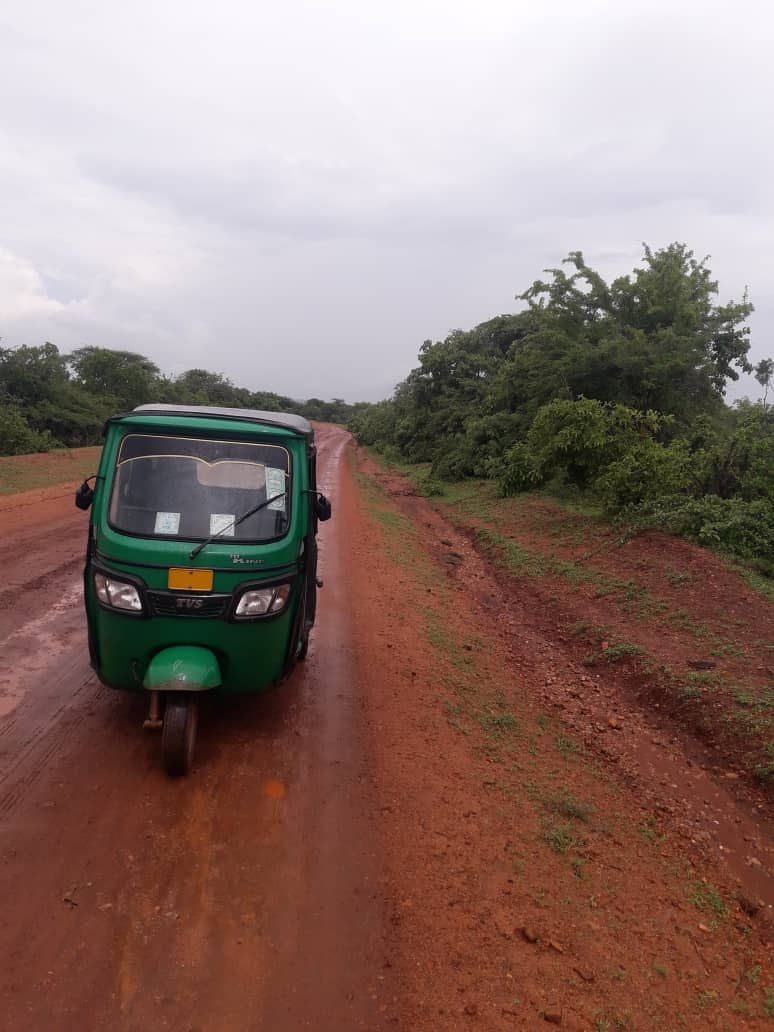
A rough road connecting Kinyangiri to Iguguno

== Education ==
Kinyangiri ward has a public primary and secondary school.

== Economy ==
Kinyangiri depends heavily on agricultural activity as its main source of business income. Cash crops includes maize, millet, beans and groundnuts.

== Housing and Buildings ==
Kinyangiri has some old buildings dating back more than 100 years during the Germany occupation. Mahakama which translates to court house and food storage facility are the oldest buildings in the village dating back to the 1890s. There are also new and modern houses with self contained rooms with electricity and running water but majority of houses are simple traditional built using earth soil, wood and grass for roofing.

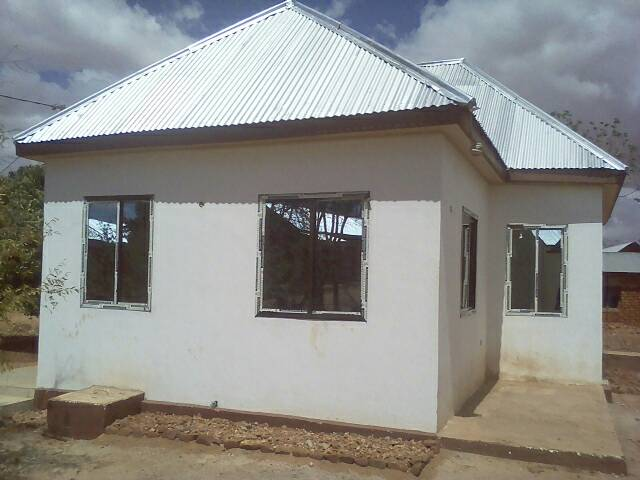
Sight of modern Houses in Kinyangiri

== Health Care ==
Kinyangiri hospital is the public and only health center in Kinyangiri as well as surrounding villages. The center provides health care and clinics for children. There are currently two chemists shops. The village also utilize traditional medicines of which its knowledge is passed from one generation to another. Locals usually use herbals from wild roots and grasses to cure certain diseases such as malaria.

== Religion and Culture ==
The ward has a significant number of Muslims and Christians, while the majority of the natives are indigenous believers. There are two small mosques, a Catholic church, Lutheran church and other churches.
