= David Mathayo David =

Tanzanian politician

Honourable David Mathayo David MP

Minister of Livestock and Fisheries Development
- In office 28 November 2010 – 20 December 2013
- President: Jakaya Kikwete
- Preceded by: John Magufuli

Deputy Minister of Agriculture, Food and Cooperatives
- In office 17 October 2006 – 31 October 2010

Deputy Minister of Industry, Trade & Marketing
- In office 6 January 2006 – 16 October 2006

Member of Parliament for Same West
- Incumbent
- Assumed office December 2005
- Preceded by: John Singo

Personal details
- Born: 24 July 1969 (age 57)
- Party: CCM
- Spouse: Pamela Mathayo
- Education: Sokoine University (BSc); University of Pretoria (MSc); Free State University (PhD)

David Mathayo David (born 24 July 1969) is a Tanzanian CCM politician and Member of Parliament for Same West constituency since 2005. He is the current Minister of Livestock and Fisheries Development.

== Background ==
Mathayo (formerly known as David Msuya) graduated from Sokoine University in Morogoro with a Bachelor of Veterinary Medicine in 1997. He is known to have emigrated to Botswana to teach at an agricultural college in Serowe. While in Botswana he "won" an election as an MP of West Same constituent back in Tanzania and got picked to be a deputy minister in Trade and Industry. He is currently serving as the deputy minister for agriculture.

Mathayo was one of the youngest MPs to be into a ministerial post. His selection was the epitome of president Kikwete's new leadership style which disregarded age as a factor and valued education and talent. Mathayo's qualifications have been a subject of debate in the public since his selection into his current ministerial position. Many wonder how he managed to achieve all his postgraduate qualifications in 5 years while working on a full-time basis in Botswana. According to his on-line CV^{1}, he graduated in Sokoine (BVM) in 1997 (this qualification as a vet doctor is undisputed). From here he went to teach at a college in Serowe Botswana where he also got his M.Sc (1998–2001, then he got his Pg.Dip (2000–2001), then his Ph.D. in agriculture (2001–2003). Many people who know Mathayo personally including his Sokoine University lecturers believe that his postgraduate qualifications, especially the Ph.D, are unlikely to be genuine. Recently the Tanzania Commission for Universities (TCU) wrote a letter that they had verified the authenticity of Dr Mathayo's certificates.^{2} However, the question still remains whether the TCU verified the certificates or the actual studies and qualifications of Mathayo.^{3}

== Education chronology ==
- Marindi Primary School (1978–1984)
- Galanos Secondary School (1985–1988)
- Tosamaganga Secondary School (1989–1991)
- National Service (1991–1992)
- Sokoine University of Agriculture (1992–1997)
- India Postgraduate diploma (public administration) (1998–1999)
- University of Pretoria Masters of Science (1998 2001)
- Ambala University (PgDip International relations) (2000–2001)
- Free State University (PhD Agriculture) (2001–2003)

== Work chronology ==
- Teacher at Serowe College Botswana (1998–2001)(full-time)
- Teacher at Associated college of University of Botswana (2001–2003) ?This is the same as Serowe college?

== Politics ==
- CCM Member of National Executive Council (1997–2002) While out of the country serving another government
- CCM Member of Parliament of Tanzania (2005–2010)
