= Inauguration of John Magufuli =

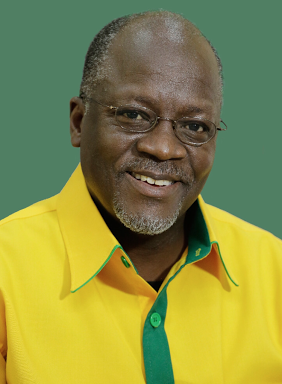
- Date: 5 November 2015
- Location: Uhuru Stadium, Dar es Salaam
- Participants: President-elect John Magufuli; Samia Suluhu

The inauguration of John Magufuli as the 5th president of Tanzania took place on Thursday, 5 November 2015. It marked the commencement of the first five-year term of John Magufuli as President and Samia Suluhu as Vice President.

Magufuli won the 2015 presidential election, receiving 58% of the vote. Outgoing President Jakaya Kikwete declared the day as a public holiday.

== Attendance ==
=== Dignitaries ===
Country	Title	Dignitary
Botswana	Vice President	Ponatshego Kedikilwe
DR Congo	President	Joseph Kabila
Ethiopia	Prime Minister	Hailemariam Desalegn
Kenya	President	Uhuru Kenyatta
Malawi	Vice President	Saulos Chilima
Mozambique	President	Filipe Nyusi
Rwanda	President	Paul Kagame
South Africa	President	Jacob Zuma
Uganda	President	Yoweri Museveni
Zambia	President	Edgar Lungu
Zimbabwe	President	Robert Mugabe

=== Government representatives ===
Country	Title	Dignitary
Burundi	Speaker of Parliament	Pascal Nyabenda
China	Special Envoy	Zhang Ping
Namibia	Foreign Minister / Deputy Prime Minister	Netumbo Nandi-Ndaitwah
South Africa	Foreign Minister	Maite Nkoana-Mashabane
Swaziland	Deputy Prime Minister	Paul Dlamini
Zambia	Foreign Minister	Harry Kalaba

=== Former leaders ===
Country	Title	Dignitary
Comoros	former President	Ahmed Abdallah Mohamed Sambi
Kenya	former Prime Minister	Raila Odinga
Tanzania	former President	Ali Hassan Mwinyi
Tanzania	former President	Benjamin Mkapa
Tanzania	former President	Jakaya Kikwete
Tanzania	former Vice President	Mohamed Gharib Bilal
Tanzania	former Prime Minister	Mizengo Pinda

=== International organizations ===
Organisation	Title	Dignitary
East African Community	Secretary General	Richard Sezibera
International Conference on the Great Lakes Region	Executive Secretary	Ntumba Luaba
Southern African Development Community	Executive Secretary	Stergomena Tax
Commonwealth of Nations	Deputy Secretary General	Deodat Maharaj
