= Matongo (Singida ward) =

Ward in Mkalama, Singida, Tanzania

Matongo Kata ya Matongo
- Ward
- Location within Tanzania Location within Africa
- Coordinates: 4.08774°S 34.74794°E
- Country: Tanzania
- Region: Singida Region
- District: Mkalama District
- Ward: Matongo

Population (2016)
  - Total: 6,955
- Time zone: UTC+3 (EAT)
- Postcode: 43514

Matongo is an administrative ward in the Mkalama District of the Singida Region of Tanzania. In 2016 the Tanzania National Bureau of Statistics report there were 6,955 people in the ward, from 6,338 in 2012.

== Villages ==
The ward has 18 villages.

- Matongo A
- Matongo B
- Kirumi
- Hindamili
- Mpondelo
- Isene Isene
- Kinyamapupu
- Igwilambao
- Idebe
- Kinyamkunde
- Manung'una Munung’una
- Mwamakiki
- Mabiha
- Mwamidu
- Mazangili Mazangili
- Tandusi
- Munguli
- Mkenka
