= Tanzania Rural and Urban Roads Agency =

Tanzanian road agency

- Wakala wa Barabara za Vijijini na Mijini (Swahili)

Agency overview
- Formed: 2 June 2017; 9 years ago
- Jurisdiction: Government of Tanzania
- Headquarters: TARURA House Kasim Majaliwa Road Dodoma, Tanzania; 6°08′00″S 35°55′22″E
- Annual budget: TSh 226.4 billion
- Agency executive: Victor Seff, Chief executive
- Parent department: President's Office – Regional Administration and Local Government
- Key document: Executive Agencies Act No. 30 of 1997
- Website: www.tarura.go.tz

The Tanzania Rural and Urban Roads Agency (TARURA; Swahili: Wakala wa Barabara za Vijijini na Mijini) is the division of the President's Office – Regional Administration and Local Government (PO-RALG) that oversees Tanzania's rural and urban road network. Along with the Tanzania National Roads Agency (TANROADS), it is one of two agencies tasked with the maintenance of Tanzania's road network. TARURA was created by the Tanzanian government under the Executive Agencies Act of 1997, and the agency officially launched on 2 July 2017.

== History ==
TARURA was established by Government Notice No. 211 on 12 May 2017 under the Executive Agencies Act of 1997. The agency was officially launched the next month by former prime minister Kassim Majaliwa on 2 July. Along with the Tanzania National Roads Agency (TANROADS), which oversees trunk roads, TARURA is one of two agencies tasked with the maintenance of Tanzania's road infrastructure.

TARURA received the Pioneer Award award during the first Safe Schools Africa forum in July 2025.

== Functions and programmes ==
TARURA's main functions are the maintenance, development, and improvement of Tanzania's rural and urban roads. The agency handles contract negotiations with private sector entities for the financing of road projects. It is tasked with adopting and promoting sustainable practices and maintaining a rural and urban road databank. It operates under five-year strategic plans.

TARURA's ability to track the status of its road network is limited due to a lack of an effective monitoring system. Though the Tanzanian government set up the District Road Management System (DROMAS) for this purpose, it is not comprehensive and has not been reliably updated.

=== Roads for Inclusion and Socioeconomic Opportunities ===
The Roads for Inclusion and Socioeconomic Opportunities (RISE) project aims to address major bottlenecks in Tanzania's road network. TARURA is tasked with district road upgrades and bottleneck improvements as well as the Community Based Routine Maintenance (CBRM) programme. Except for the CBRM programme, funding is provided by the World Bank.

== Organisation ==
TARURA is an executive agency under the President's Office – Regional Administration and Local Government (PO-RALG). Funding and oversight is also provided by the Roads Fund Board, with TARURA receiving a 30% share from collected toll revenue. TARURA is headed by a chief executive officer, who is subordinate to the permanent secretary of PO-RALG. Three directorates report to the TARURA chief executive: the directorate of rural roads, the directorate of urban roads, and the directorate of business support services. Each directorate is headed by a director with two manages under their supervision. The agency is also organised into regional offices that report directly to the chief executive. The agency had a total of 1,219 employees as of 2019. As of 2026, its chief executive officer is Victor Seff.
