= Kidaru =

Coordinates: 4°06′S 34°28′E

Kidaru is an administrative ward in the Iramba district of the Singida Region of Tanzania. According to the 2002 census, the ward has a total population of 10,469.
