= Kyengege =

Ward in Iramba, Singida, Tanzania

Kyengege Kata ya Kyengege
- Ward
- Location within Tanzania
- Coordinates: 4.4374466°S 34.478249°E
- Country: Tanzania
- Region: Singida Region
- District: Iramba District
- Ward: Kyengege

Population (2016)
  - Total: 8,608
- Time zone: UTC+3 (EAT)

Kyengege is an administrative ward in the Iramba district of the Singida Region of Tanzania. In 2016 the Tanzania National Bureau of Statistics report there were 8,608 people in the ward, from 7,845 in 2012.
