= Miganga =

Coordinates: 4.23352°S 34.72222°E

Miganga is an administrative ward in the Mkalama District of the Singida Region of Tanzania. According to the 2012 census, the ward had a total population of 8,486.
