= Mgongo =

Tanzanian administrative ward

Coordinates: 4°20′S 34°10′E

Mgongo is an administrative ward in the Iramba district of the Singida Region of Tanzania. According to the 2002 census, the ward has a total population of 13,041.
