= Mtoa =

Ward in Iramba, Singida, Tanzania

Mtoa Kata ya Mtoa
- Ward
- Location within Tanzania
- Coordinates: 4.5283228°S 34.1857689°E
- Country: Tanzania
- Region: Singida Region
- District: Iramba District
- Ward: Mtoa

Population (2016)
  - Total: 21,643
- Time zone: UTC+3 (EAT)
- Postal code: 43311

Mtoa is an administrative ward in the Iramba District of the Singida Region of Tanzania. In 2016 the Tanzania National Bureau of Statistics report there were 21,643 people in the ward, from 19,724 in 2012.

== Climatology ==
Mtoa

Climate chart (precipitation, max. and min. temperature)
J	F	M	A	M	J	J	A	S	O	N	D
171 29 18	123 32 19	169 29 18	155 26 18	7 30 19	4 33 18	1 34 17	3 37 19	3 40 20	44 42 21	84 38 20	199 33 19
- █ Average max. and min. temperatures in °C
- █ Precipitation totals in mm
Imperial conversion
J	F	M	A	M	J	J	A	S	O	N	D
6.7 84 64	4.8 90 66	6.7 84 64	6.1 79 64	0.3 86 66	0.2 91 64	0 93 63	0.1 99 66	0.1 104 68	1.7 108 70	3.3 100 68	7.8 91 66
- █ Average max. and min. temperatures in °F
- █ Precipitation totals in inches

Mtoa is located in the Aw (Savannah) Köppen climate classification. The average temperature does not go below freezing, and can see temperatures into the 100s in the spring months.

== Etymology ==
Mtoa is a Swahili word that means giver or provider. It stems from the Swahili root -toa (lit. to produce).
