= Mbelekese =

Coordinates: 4°38′S 34°22′E

Mbelekese is an administrative ward in the Iramba district of the Singida Region of Tanzania. According to the 2002 census, the ward has a total population of 10,270.
