= Kisiriri =

Administrative ward in Tanzania

Coordinates: 4°12′S 34°26′E

Kisiriri is an administrative ward in the Iramba district of the Singida Region of Tanzania. According to the 2002 census, the ward has a total population of 10,245.
