= Mkalama District =

- District
- Mkalama District's location within Singida Region.
- Coordinates: 04°07′S 34°39′E
- Country: Tanzania
- Region: Singida Region

Area
  - Total: 3,121 km^{2} (1,205 sq mi)

Population (2022)
  - Total: 255,514
  - Density: 81.87/km^{2} (212.0/sq mi)

Mkalama District is one of the six districts of the Singida Region of Tanzania. It is one of the 20 new districts that were formed in Tanzania since 2010; it was split off from Iramba District. Mkalama District is bordered to the north by Simiyu Region and Arusha Region, to the east by Manyara Region, to the south by Singida Rural District and to the west by Iramba District.

According to the 2012 Tanzania National Census, the population of Mkalama District was 255,514.

== Transport ==
Paved trunk road T3 from Morogoro to the Rwandan border passes through a small portion of the district.

== Administrative subdivisions ==
As of 2012, Mkalama District was administratively divided into 14 wards.

=== Wards ===
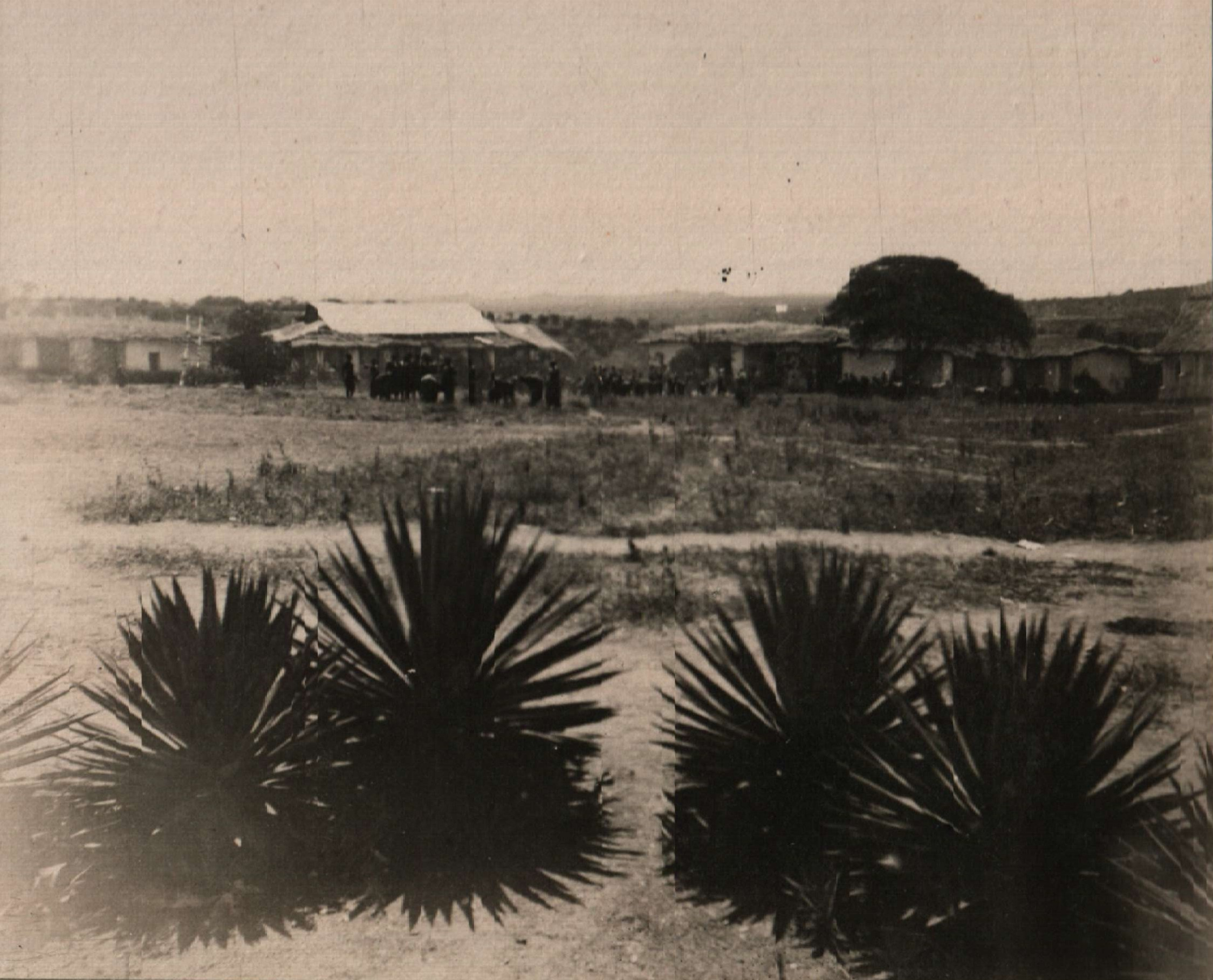
A village in Mkalama

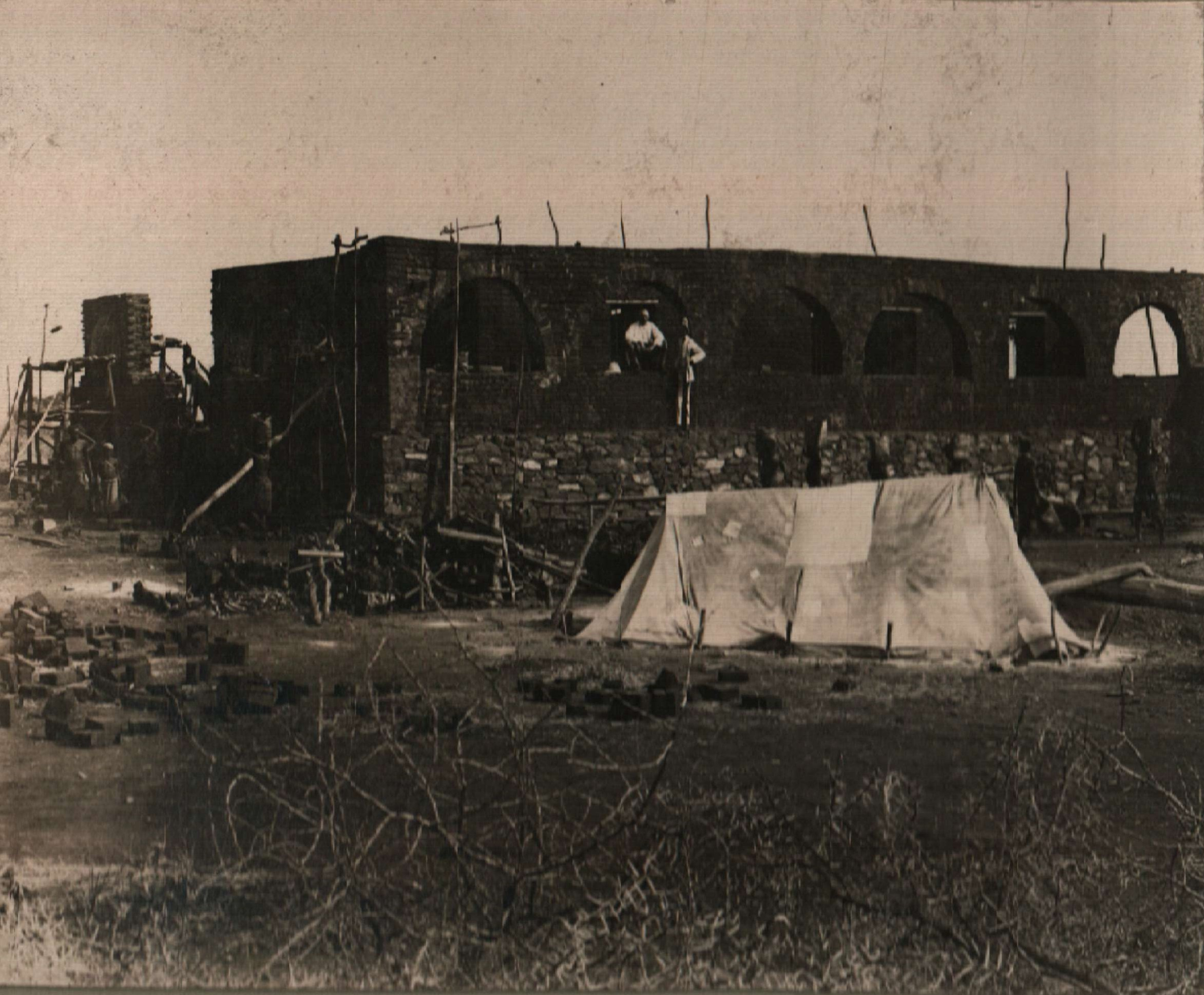
Construction of an Austrian house in Mkalama

- Gumanga
- Ibaga
- Iguguno
- Ilunda
- Kikhonda
- Kinyangiri
- Matongo
- Miganga
- Mpambala
- Msingi (English meaning: Primary or Foundation)
- Mwanga
- Mwangeza
- Nduguti
- Nkinto
