= Mfugale Flyover =

Road intersection in Tanzania

Eng. Patrick Mfugale Flyover
- Daraja la juu la Eng. Patrick Mfugale
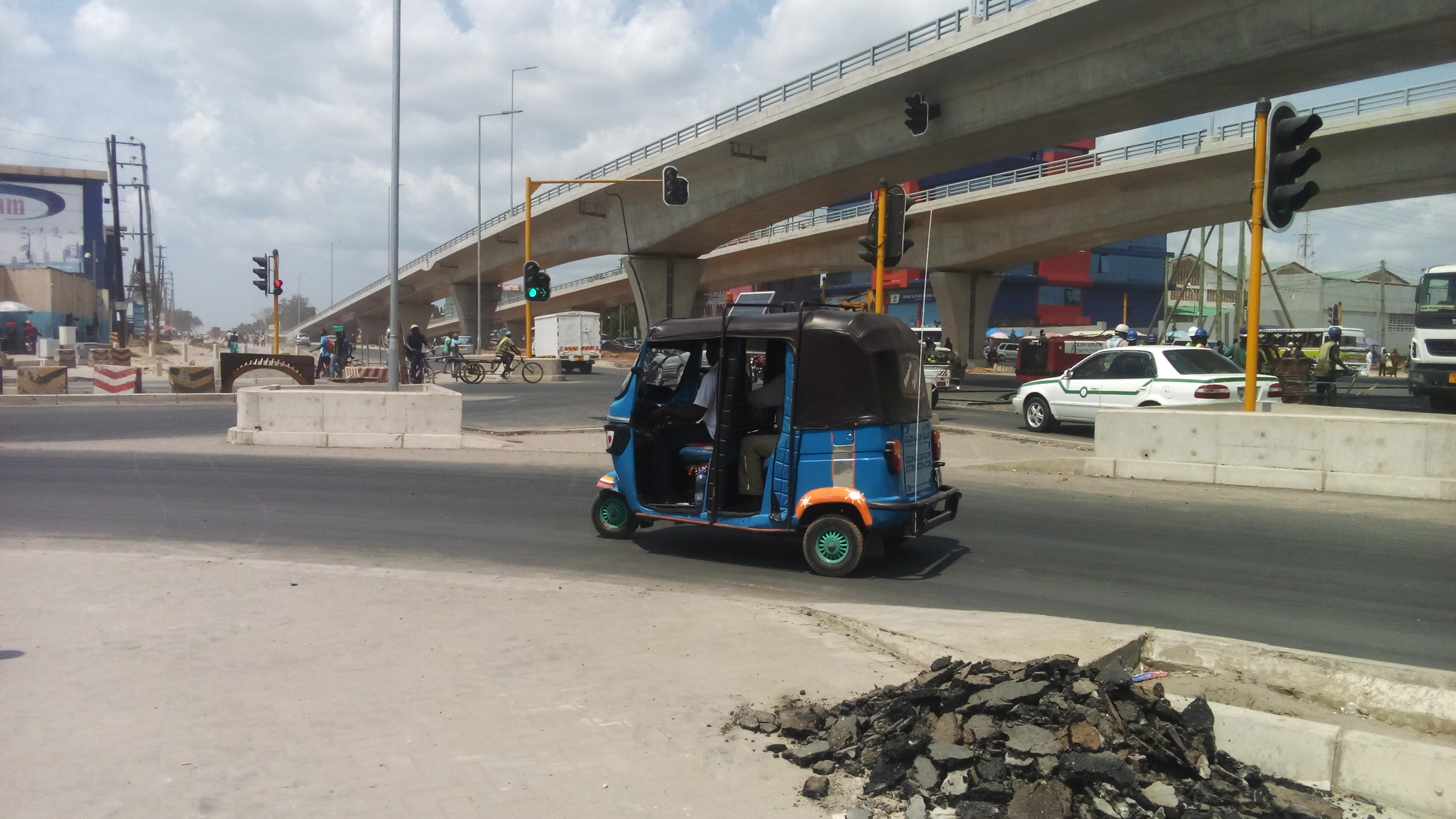
- Interactive map of Eng. Patrick Mfugale Flyover

Location
- Dar es Salaam, Tanzania
- Coordinates: 6°50′38″S 39°14′45″E
- Roads at junction: Nyerere Road; Nelson Mandela Road

Construction
- Type: Flyover
- Constructed: 16 April 2016
- Opened: 27 September 2018
- Maintained by: TANROADS

The Mfugale Flyover, officially known as the Eng. Patrick Mfugale Flyover (Swahili: Daraja la juu la Eng. Patrick Mfugale) and formerly known as the TAZARA Flyover, is a pair of two-lane flyovers at TAZARA Intersection in Dar es Salaam, Tanzania. Construction of the flyover began on 16 April 2016, and it was officially opened on 27 September 2018, becoming the first grade separated flyover in Dar es Salaam. Its construction was funded by the Japan International Cooperation Agency (JICA), costing about TSh 96–103 billion (US$42–45 million). It was named after former TANROADS chief executive Patrick Mfugale on 26 September 2018 by president John Magufuli. It accommodated 40,000 vehicles daily by 2020.

== Layout ==
The flyover is located at TAZARA Intersection between Nyerere Road, which connects Julius Nyerere International Airport to Dar es Salaam, and Nelson Mandela Road. The TAZARA Railway Station lies at the intersection. On approach to the intersection, Nyerere Road feeds into a pair of two-lane flyovers, each accompanied by a two-lane frontage road. The flyovers are 425 m (1,394 ft) long. They are composed of a 155 m (509 ft) central three-span box-girder bridge with four- and five-span hollow slab bridge approaches on the east and west, respectively. The bridges rise to a vertical clearance of 5.5 m (18 ft). A 12 m (39 ft) median gap was built to accommodate eventual bus rapid transit (BRT) expansion.

== History ==
The flyover was constructed as part of Japan's Grant Aid Project. It was funded by the government of Japan through the Japan International Cooperation Agency (JICA), with a cost of about TSh 96–103 billion (US$42–45 million). Prior to construction, TAZARA Intersection was a major traffic bottleneck, causing frequent delays and disruption. The flyover was constructed in order to alleviate congestion, particularly for traffic between Julius Nyerere International Airport and Dar es Salaam's suburbs.

Construction was initially scheduled to start in 2013. Disagreements on how to divide contracts and risk management delayed the start of construction by several years. A contract was signed in October 2015 with Sumitomo Mitsui Construction. Construction commenced with a groundbreaking ceremony held on 16 April 2016. President John Magufuli laid the first foundation stone, with members of parliament, the mayors of DSM, and Japanese ambassador Masaharu Yoshida in attendance. The flyover was opened for testing on 15 September 2018. On 26 September, Magufuli named the flyover after Patrick Mfugale, chief executive of the Tanzania National Roads Agency (TANROADS). It was officially opened for public use the next day by Magufuli in a ceremony, becoming the first grade separated flyover in Dar es Salaam. A bus rapid transit passenger terminal was constructed at the flyover as part of the Dar es Salaam Rapid Transit (UDART) BRT Phase III project.

== See also ==
- Kijazi Interchange – interchange between Nelson Mandela Road and Morogoro Road
