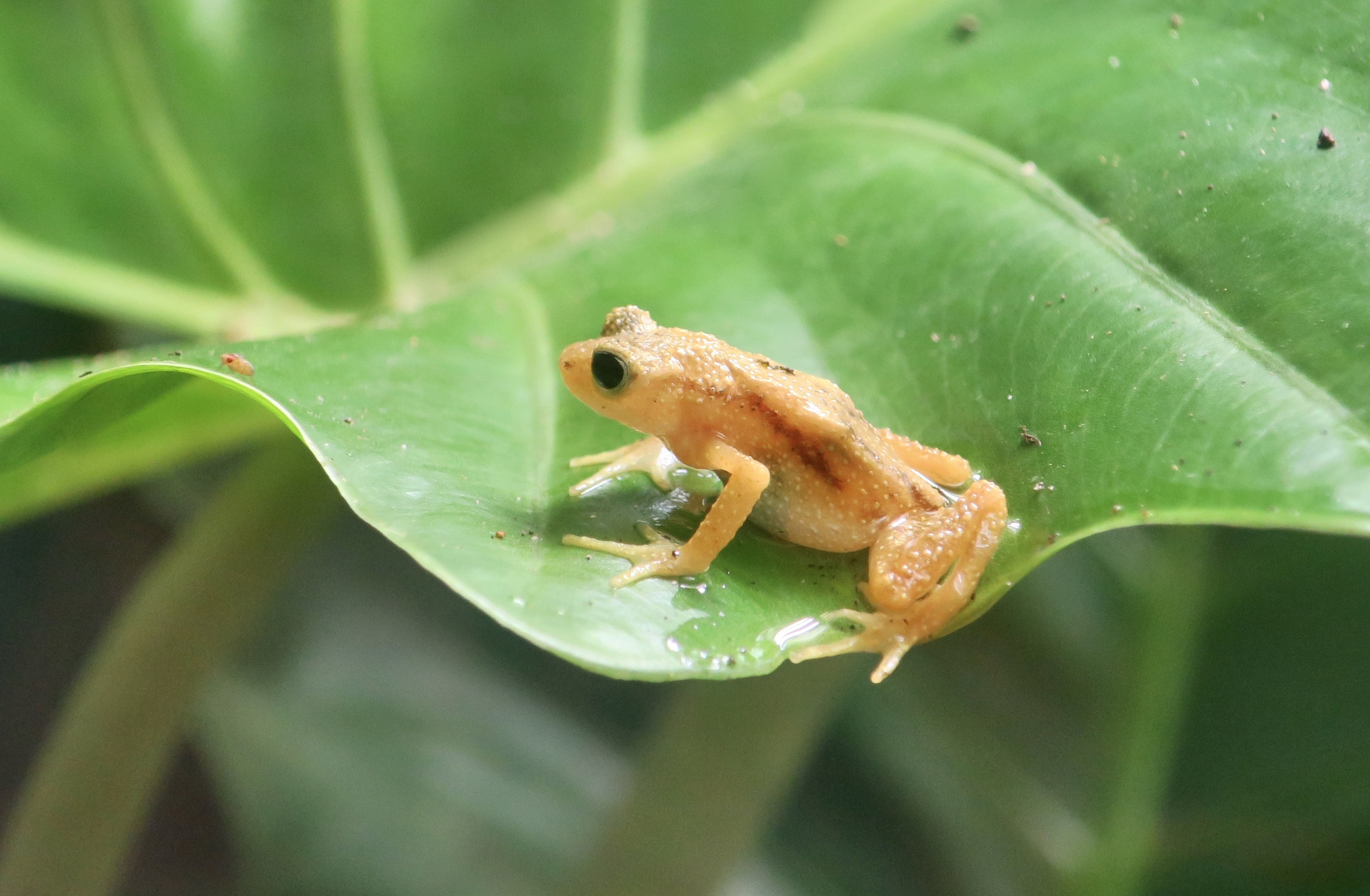
- A Kihansi spray toad at Bronx Zoo

Conservation status
- Extinct in the Wild (IUCN 3.1)
- CITES Appendix I

Scientific classification
- Kingdom: Animalia
- Phylum: Chordata
- Class: Amphibia
- Order: Anura
- Family: Bufonidae
- Genus: Nectophrynoides
- Species: N. asperginis

Binomial name
- Nectophrynoides asperginis Poynton, Howell, Clarke & Lovett, 1999

= Kihansi spray toad =

Species of amphibian

The Kihansi spray toad (Nectophrynoides asperginis) is a small toad that was endemic to Tanzania. The species is live-bearing and insectivorous. The Kihansi spray toad is currently categorized as extinct in the wild by the International Union for Conservation of Nature (IUCN), though the species persists in ex situ, captive breeding populations. Currently, there are an estimate of 6,200 Kihansi spray toads in captivity, a majority in the Bronx Zoo and Toledo Zoo.

== Physiology ==
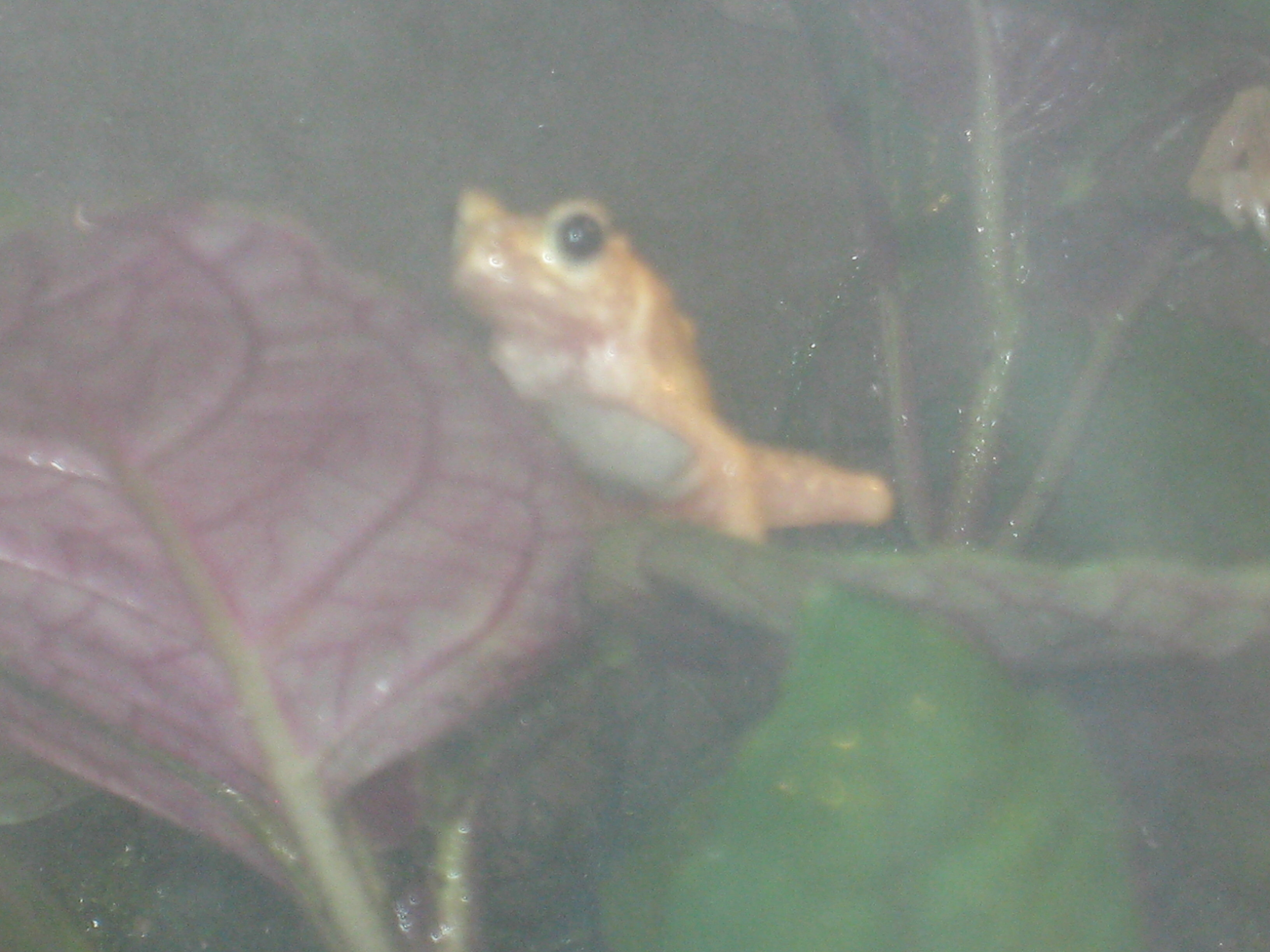
A toad at Toledo Zoo

The Kihansi spray toad is a small, sexually dimorphic anuran, with females reaching up to 2.9 cm (1.1 in) long and males up to 1.9 cm (0.75 in). The toads display yellow skin coloration with brownish markings. They have webbed toes on their hind legs, but lack expanded toe tips. They lack external ears, but do possess normal anuran inner ear features, with the exception of tympanic membranes and air-filled middle ear cavities. Females are often duller in coloration, and males normally have more significant markings Additionally, males exhibit dark inguinal patches on their sides where their hind legs meet their abdomens. Abdominal skin is translucent, and developing offspring can often be seen in the bellies of gravid females. The toad breeds by using internal fertilization, in which females retain larvae internally in the oviduct until their offspring are born.

== Habitat ==
Prior to its extirpation, the Kihansi spray toad was endemic only to a two-hectare (5-acre) area at the base of the Kihansi River waterfall in the Udzungwa escarpment of the Eastern Arc Mountains in Tanzania. The Kihansi Gorge is about 4 km (2.5 mi) long with a north–south orientation. A number of wetlands made up the habitat of this species, all fed by spray from the Kihansi River waterfall. These wetlands were characterized by dense, grassy vegetation including Panicum grasses, Selaginella kraussiana clubmosses, and snail ferns (Tectaria gemmifera). Areas within the spray zones of the waterfall experienced near-constant temperatures and 100% humidity. Currently, an artificial gravity-fed sprinkler system is in place to mimic the original conditions of the spray zones. The species' global range covered an area of less than two hectares around the Kihansi Falls, and no additional populations have been located after searching for it around other waterfalls on the escarpment of the Udzungwa Mountains.

== Extinction in the wild ==
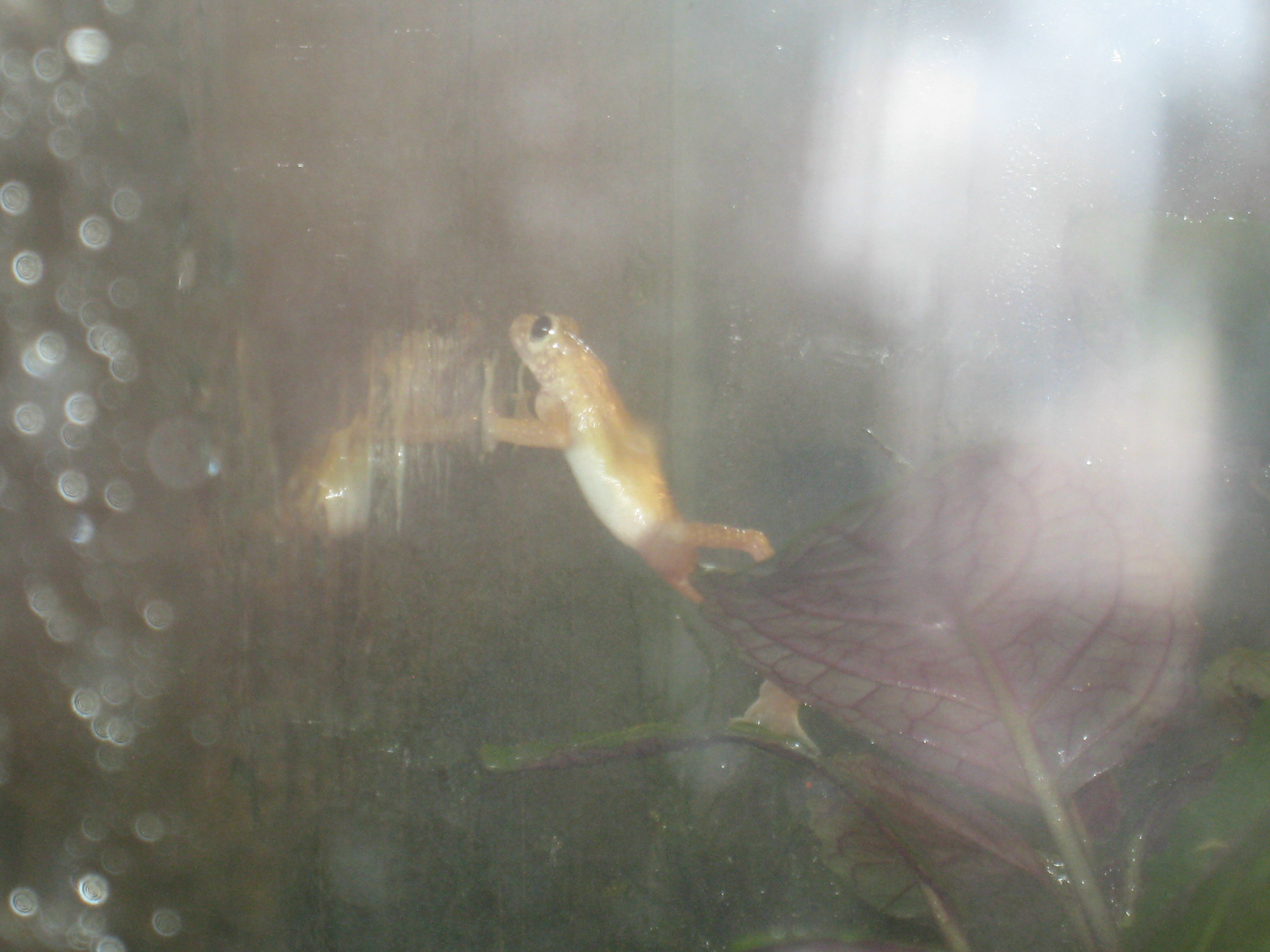
A toad at Toledo Zoo

Prior to extinction, there was a population of around 17,000 individuals and fluctuating naturally. The population hit a high in May 1999, dropped to lower numbers in 2001 and 2002, hit a high again in June 2003 (around 20,989 individuals), before steeply declining to a point in January 2004 when only three individuals could be seen and two males were heard calling. The species was listed as Extinct in the Wild in May 2009. The extinction in the wild of the Kihansi spray toad was mainly due to habitat loss following the construction of Kihansi Dam in 1999, which reduced the amount of water coming down from the waterfall into the gorge by 90 percent, hugely reducing the volume of the spray, particularly in the dry season, as well as altering vegetational composition. This led to the spray toad's microhabitat being compromised, as it reduced the amount of water spray, which the toads were reliant on. The sprinkler system that mimicked the natural water spray was not yet operational when the Kihansi Dam opened. In 2003 there was a final population crash in the species. This coincided with a breakdown of the sprinkler system during the dry season, the appearance of the disease chytridiomycosis, and the brief opening of the Kihansi Dam to flush out sediments, which contained pesticides used in maize farming operations upstream. The last confirmed record of wild Kihansi spray toads was in 2004.

== Conservation efforts ==
=== Environmental management ===
Between July 2000 and March 2001, gravity-fed artificial spray systems were built and placed in three areas of spray wetlands that were affected by the Kihansi Dam. These spray systems functioned to mimic the fine water spray that had existed prior to the diversion of the Kihansi river, maintaining the microhabitat. The installation was initially successful in maintaining the spray-zone habitat, but after 18 months, marsh and stream-side plants retreated and a weedy species overran the area, changing the overall plant-species composition. The next steps in environmental management included ecological monitoring, mitigation, establishing rights of water authority and Tanesco to implement hydrological resources for conservation of the Kihansi spray toad and spray wetlands habitat.

=== Captive breeding ===
An ex situ breeding program is maintained by North American zoos in the effort to reintroduce the species back into the wild. The program was initiated in 2001 by the Bronx Zoo when almost 500 Kihansi spray toads were taken from their native gorge and placed in six U.S. zoos as a possible hedge against extinction. Initially its unusual life style and reproduction mode caused problems in captivity, and only Bronx Zoo and Toledo Zoo were able to maintain populations. By December 2004, fewer than 70 remained in captivity, but when their exact requirements were discovered greater survival and breeding success was achieved. In November 2005, the Toledo Zoo opened an exhibit for the Kihansi spray toad, and for some time this was the only place in the world where it was on display to the public. The Toledo Zoo now has several thousand Kihansi spray toads, the majority off-exhibit. The Bronx Zoo also has several thousand Kihansi spray toads, and it opened a small exhibit for some of these in February 2010. In 2010, Toledo Zoo transferred 350 toads to Chattanooga Zoo, which has created a small exhibit for them. Groups numbering in the hundreds are now also maintained at Detroit Zoo and Omaha's Henry Doorly Zoo.

=== Reintroduction into the wild ===
In August 2010, a group of 100 Kihansi spray toads were flown from the Bronx Zoo and Toledo Zoo to their native Tanzania, as part of an effort to reintroduce the species into the wild, using a propagation center at the University of Dar es Salaam. In 2012, scientists from the center returned a test population of 48 toads to the Kihansi gorge, having found means to co-inhabit the toads with substrates presumed to contain chytrid fungus. The substrates were extracted from the Kihansi gorge spray wetlands, and mixed with captive toads with their surrogate species from the wild. Reintroduction commenced because its substrate appeared to not harbor any infectious agents that could threaten the survival of the species. In 2017, a reintroduction program will be launched and currently a few Kihansi spray toads will be successfully reintroduced in Tanzania.

Despite strict protocols in the breeding facilities, toads are occasionally attacked by chytrid fungus, resulting in mass deaths at the Kihansi facility. Air conditioning and water filtration system malfunctions have also contributed to toad mortality. Researchers suggest that reintroduction of the species in the wild might take time because it needs to adapt slowly to the wild habitat in which it needs to search for food, evade predators, and overcome disease, in contrast to the controlled environment they lived in during captivity.
