= Ntwike =

Coordinates: 4°15′S 34°12′E

Ntwike is an administrative ward in the Iramba district of the Singida Region of Tanzania. According to the 2002 census, the ward has a total population of 14,221.
