= Shelui =

Coordinates: 4°22′S 34°12′E

Shelui is an administrative ward in the Iramba district of the Singida Region of Tanzania. According to the 2002 census, the ward has a total population of 23,519.
