= Ndulungu =

Ward in Iramba, Singida, Tanzania

Ndulungu Kata ya Ndulungu
- Ward
- Location within Tanzania
- Coordinates: 4.7769136°S 34.372659°E
- Country: Tanzania
- Region: Singida Region
- District: Iramba District
- Ward: Ndulungu

Population (2016)
  - Total: 11,390
- Time zone: UTC+3 (EAT)

Ndulungu is an administrative ward in the Iramba District of the Singida Region of Tanzania. In 2016 the Tanzania National Bureau of Statistics report there were 11,390 people in the ward, from 10,380 in 2012.
