= Ndago =

Coordinates: 4°36′S 34°21′E

Ndago is an administrative ward in the Iramba district of the Singida Region of Tanzania. According to the 2002 census, the ward has a total population of 12,332.
