= Tulya =

Ward in Iramba, Singida, Tanzania

Tulya Kata ya Tulya
- Ward
- Location within Tanzania
- Coordinates: 4.1213598°S 34.3346467°E
- Country: Tanzania
- Region: Singida Region
- District: Iramba District
- Ward: Tulya

Population (2016)
  - Total: 9,069
- Time zone: UTC+3 (EAT)

Tulya is an administrative ward in the Iramba District of the Singida Region of Tanzania. The ward is bounded to the north by Lake Kitangiri.

In 2016 the Tanzania National Bureau of Statistics report there were 9,069 people in the ward, from 8,265 in 2012.
