= Ulanga River =

River in Morogoro Region, Tanzania

Designations

Ramsar Wetland
- Official name: Kilombero Valley Floodplain
- Designated: 25 April 2002
- Reference no.: 1173

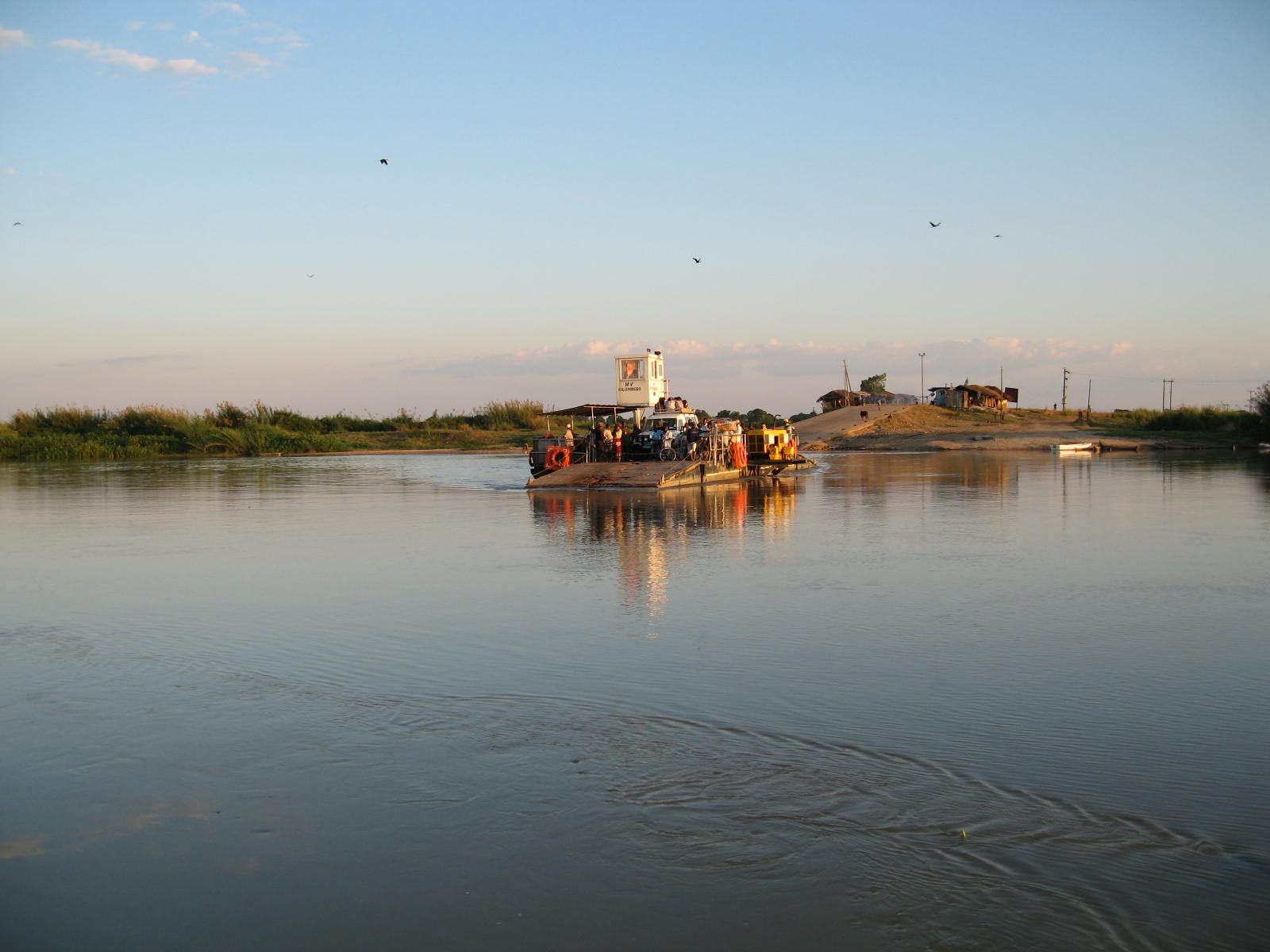
Ferry over the Kilombero River, near Ifakara, Tanzania

The Ulanga River, also known as the Kilombero River, rises in the highlands of the southwest of Morogoro Region, Tanzania, on the eastern slope of the East African Rift. The river flows northeast along the northeastern border of the Lindi Region before it flows into the Rufiji River. The Rufiji eventually flows into the Indian Ocean on the southern coast of the Pwani Region.

== Geology ==
The Ulanga Valley is an intact natural wetland ecosystem comprising myriad rivers, which make up the largest seasonally freshwater lowland floodplain in East Africa. The Ulanga River supplies two thirds of the Rufiji waters.

The Ulanga River is formed by the convergence of major rivers coming from the south, that flow north from the mountain ranges of the Njombe and Iringa regions on the eastern slope of the East African Rift and south from the Udzungwa Mountains and Mahenge Mountains. From south the Ruhudji River winds eastward, losing height quite rapidly, to the head of the great floodplain of the Ulanga Valley. The floodplain occupies the flat floor of the Ulanga Valley at 210–250 m.a.s.l. The valley is oriented south-west north-east, between densely forested escarpments in the Udzungwa Mountains, which tower at 2,250 meters above the valley floor (7°47′0″S 36°36′0″E), on the north-western side and the Mahenge Mountains on the southern side (8°45′0″S 36°39′0″E). The Ruhudji receives several important tributaries and then divides on the floodplain into a number of channels, which produce a network in the central part of the floodplain. Other affluents draining the mountains on opposing sides of the valley join the network so that in the central part there are ten major channels flowing roughly in parallel. A zone of permanent swamps, 45 km long, extends up to 4 km away from the west bank of the Kihansi River. The Kihansi was dammed in its upstream ranges above the Kihansi Gorge in 1995. The southern central parts of the floodplain descend 40 meters over a distance of 210 km. At Ifakara the valley narrows in to be about 4 km wide and the rivers are united into the main stream of the Ulanga River. East of Ifakara the Ulanga flows through a delta of oxbow lakes and is joined on its left bank by the Msolwa River. This stream comes from the high escarpment of the Udzungwas and traverses the northern part of the floodplain, skirting another zone of permanent swampland to the west. From the point of confluence the Ulanga River swings sharply southeast and leaves the floodplain (and the Ramsar Site) on the border of the Selous Game Reserve. The Ulanga River then continues for 65 km to confluence with the Luwegu where they merge at the Shuguli Falls to become the Rufiji River. The Rufiji then flows northeast through the Selous Game Reserve on its way to the Indian Ocean.

== History ==
Starting in 1885, Karl Peters had begun claiming areas of East Africa for Germany. The Tanganyikan coast proved relatively easy, but conquest of the inland areas of the colony—right up to the Belgian Congo—was more difficult as large parts were still unexplored. For this reason, Governor Gustav Adolf von Götzen led an expedition to claim these hinterlands. He took with him Georg von Prittwitz and Hermann Kersting.

The Ulanga River and its tributary the Kihansi were first surveyed in 1897-98 by von Prittwitz in an attempt to determine whether either river would afford a navigable waterway from the coast to the mountainous district of Uhehe. From Perondo von Prittwitz navigated the Kihansi in a canoe, determining that the Kihansi was too difficult to navigate due to the great number of sharp curves with narrow channel obstructed by hippopotamuses. The Ulanga with its broad smooth curves was easy to navigate by a light-draught steamer.

== Political and economic ==
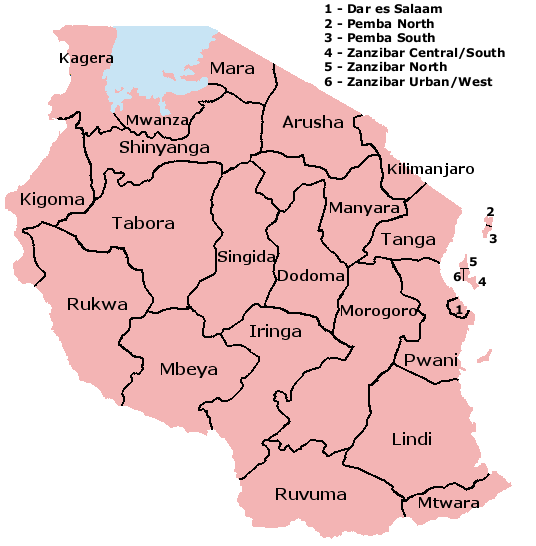
Regions of Tanzania

The Ulanga River forms the boundary between the Ulanga District and Kilombero District of the Morogoro Region in the southeast of Tanzania.

The majority of the villagers in the Ulanga Valley are subsistence farmers of maize and rice, though many make a living fishing. There are large plantations of teak wood in the Ulanga valley. In the north-west of the district, Illovo Sugar Company's sugar-cane plantations occupy most of the lowlying area.

== Wildlife ==
The Ulanga Valley is characterized by its large populations of large mammals such as the buffalo, elephant, hippopotamus, lion, and puku. The majority of the world population of puku antelopes live in the Ulanga Valley. The valley is home to one of the largest populations of Nile crocodile in Africa and is an important breeding ground for bird species such as the African openbill, white-headed lapwing, and the African skimmer. The valley is home to a number of species only found there, such as the Udzungwa red colobus monkey and three species of birds, the Ulanga weaver and two undescribed species of cisticolas.

The river supports 23 species of fish that are caught on a regular basis, including three species of fish not found downstream in the Rufiji: Alestes stuhlmannii and two species of Citharinus congicus. Fish from the Rufiji river system migrate upstream to the Ulanga to spawn, usually at the beginning of the rains in November with peak spawning activity coming around in December.

== Cultural references ==
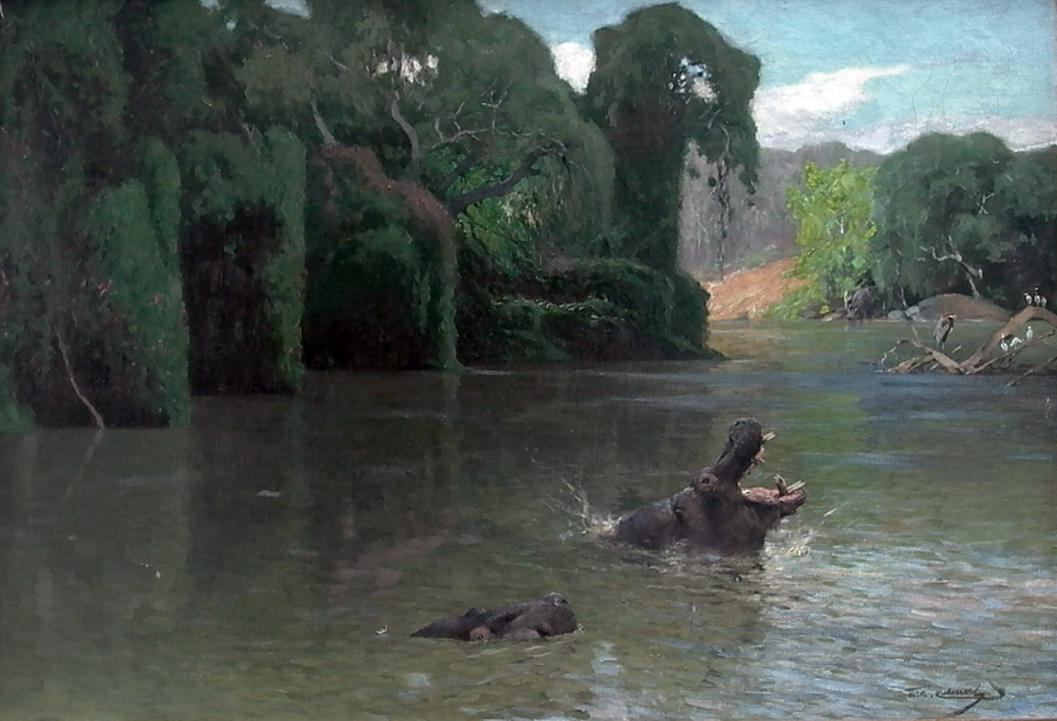
The Gallery of Trees Ulanga River, painting by Friedrich Wilhelm Kuhnert (1898)

The eponymous boat in C.S. Forester's novel The African Queen (1935) and its subsequent film adaptation (1951) was a steam-powered launch, owned by a Belgian mining corporation, that plied the upper reaches of the Ulanga River.

The German animal painter Friedrich Wilhelm Kuhnert depicted the river in his 1898 painting The Gallery of Trees Ulanga River.

== See also ==
- Kilombero Bridge
