= Ulemo =

Coordinates: 4°24′S 34°24′E

Ulemo is an administrative ward in the Iramba district of the Singida Region of Tanzania. According to the 2002 census, the ward has a total population of 14,721.
