= Kaselya =

Ward in Iramba, Singida, Tanzania

Kaselya Kata ya Kaselya
- Ward
- Location within Tanzania
- Coordinates: 4.687769°S 34.504827°E
- Country: Tanzania
- Region: Singida Region
- District: Iramba District
- Ward: Kaselya

Population (2016)
  - Total: 10,754
- Time zone: UTC+3 (EAT)

Kaselya is an administrative ward in the Iramba District of the Singida Region of Tanzania. In 2016 the Tanzania National Bureau of Statistics report there were 10,754 people in the ward, from 9,801 in 2012.
