= Mtekente =

Administrative ward in Tanzania

Coordinates: 4°33′S 34°12′E

Mtekente is an administrative ward in the Iramba district of the Singida Region of Tanzania. According to the 2002 census, the ward has a total population of 16,312.
