= Kihansi Hydroelectric Power Station =

Power station in southern Morogoro Region, Tanzania

The Kihansi Dam
- Location in Tanzania The Kihansi Dam (Africa) The Kihansi Dam (Earth)
- Official name: Bwawa la Kihansi (Swahili)
- Country: Tanzania
- Location: Mlimba, Kilombero District, Morogoro Region
- Coordinates: 08°34′30.0″S 35°51′05.0″E
- Purpose: Power
- Status: Operational
- Construction began: 1994
- Opening date: 2000
- Construction cost: US$275 million
- Owner: TANESCO

Dam and spillways
- Type of dam: Gravity dam
- Impounds: Kilombero River

Reservoir
- Catchment area: 590 km^{2} (230 sq mi)

Power Station
- Turbines: 3 × 60 MW Pelton-type
- Installed capacity: 180 MW
- Website; Tanesco utility company website

Kihansi Hydroelectric Power Station, is a 180-megawatt (240,000 hp) hydroelectric power station located in Kilombero District of southeast Morogoro Region in southern Tanzania. The power station is one of the largest dams in the country. The Tanzanian electricity company, Tanesco operates the power station on behalf of the government of Tanzania.

== Location ==
The power station is located across the Kilombero River at the southern end of the Kihansi Gorge before the convergence with the Ulanga River in Tanzania, approximately 643 kilometres (400 mi), by road, southwest of Dar Es Salaam, Tanzania's largest city. This is approximately 163 kilometres (101 mi), by road, south of Iringa, the nearest large town. The geographical coordinates of the power station are:08°34'30.0"S, 35°51'05.0"E (Latitude:-8.575000; Longitude:35.851389).

== Overview ==
The Kihansi Dam is a concrete gravity dam owned by the Tanzania Electric Supply Company Limited. Its construction began in July 1995 and was opened by President Benjamin W. Mkapa on 10 July 2000. It cost $275 million to construct. Its installed capacity is 180 megawatts and it provided approximately 13 percent of the total electrical power in Tanzania, at the time it was commissioned.

== Technical details ==
The concrete dam measures 25 metres (82 ft) in height and 200 metres (656 ft) in length. The resultant reservoir can store a total of 1,000,000 cubic metres (35,314,667 cu ft) of water, creating a lake with a surface area of 26 hectares (64 acres), when full.

The river drops approximately 900 metres (3,000 ft) in the Kihansi Gorge over a distance of about 3 kilometres (2 mi). The turbines use that gradient to generate power in an underground power station, and return the water to the river about 6 kilometres (4 mi) downstream.

== Environmental impact ==
The Kihansi Dam destroyed an 800-metre-high (2,600 ft) waterfall, affected over 20,000 villagers, and was directly responsible for the extinction in the wild of the Kihansi spray toad. The dam reduced the amount of silt and water coming down from the waterfall into the gorge by 90 percent. This led to the spray toad's microhabitat being compromised, as it reduced the amount of water spray, which the toads were directly reliant on for oxygen. This also meant that the toad may have been more susceptible to a chytrid fungus, which was believed to have been transported to the area by conservationists' boots. This chytridiomycosis, which in 2003 was confirmed to be in dead animals of the species, was possibly responsible for the sudden population crash after the world's largest sprinkler system was installed in that area in August 2003. This system was installed to try and conserve the toad species from becoming extinct in the wild, but did not succeed.

== See also ==
- List of hydropower stations in Africa
- List of power stations in Tanzania
