= Kikhonda =

Administrative ward in Tanzania

Coordinates: 4.45302°S 34.72089°E

Kikhonda is an administrative ward in the Mkalama District of the Singida Region of Tanzania. According to the 2012 census, the ward had a total population of 7,519.
