= Sibiti Bridge =

Sibiti Bridge Daraja la Sibiti (Swahili)
- Coordinates: 4°23′9.2″S 34°28′3.05″E
- Crosses: Sibiti River
- Locale: Iramba, Tanzania
- Owner: Government of Tanzania

Characteristics
- Total length: 82 metres (269 ft)

History
- Constructed by: Hainan Int. Ltd (China)
- Construction start: September 2012
- Construction end: March 2014 (projected)
- Construction cost: TSh 19.2 billion

Sibiti Bridge is a bridge in Tanzania which links Iramba with Shinyanga Region.
