= Javane =

Administrative ward in Tanzania

Coordinates: 4°14′S 34°36′E

Javane is an administrative ward in the Kongwa district of the Singida Region of Tanzania. According to the 2002 census, the ward has a total population of 9,896.
