= Kilombero Bridge =

Kilombero Bridge Daraja la Kilombero (Swahili)
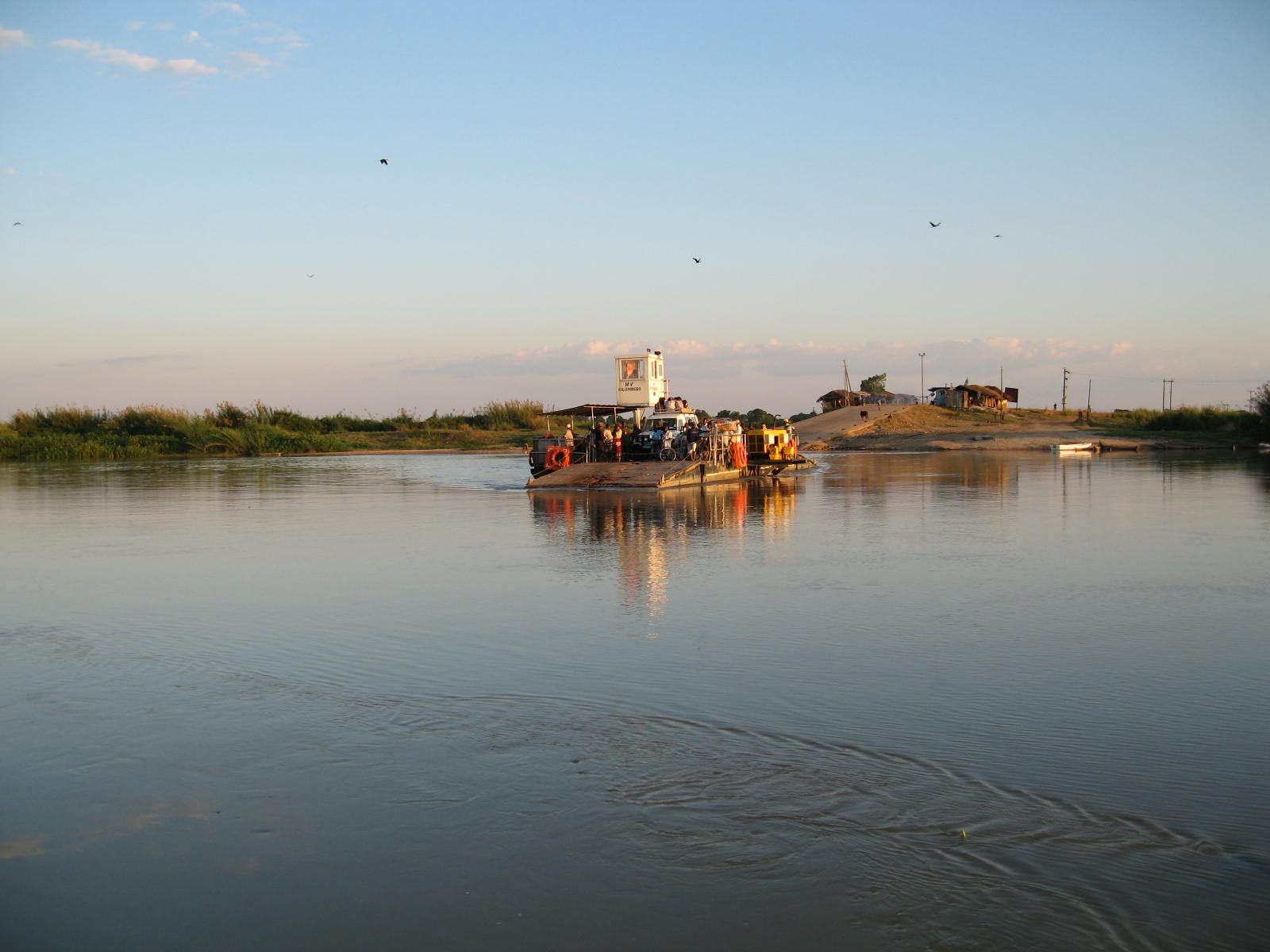
- MV Kilombero Ferry
- Coordinates: 8°11′22.46″S 36°41′36.68″E
- Carries: 2 lanes
- Crosses: Ulanga River
- Locale: 5 km south of Ifakara, Tanzania
- Owner: Government of Tanzania

Characteristics
- Total length: 384 metres (1,260 ft)
- Width: 11.3 metres (37 ft)

History
- Engineering design by: NIMETA Consult (T) Ltd & Howard Humphreys (Tanzania) Ltd
- Constructed by: China Railway 15th Bureau Group Corporation Consultant Engineer = aarvee associates in partnership with AES
- Construction start: November 2012
- Construction end: February 2017
- Construction cost: TZS 53.7 billion (USD 24.6 million)

Location
- Interactive map of Kilombero Bridge

Kilombero Bridge is a bridge connecting in Kilombero District and Ulanga District of Morogoro Region in Tanzania. It is the longest bridge in Morogoro Region crossing the Ulanga River.

It links the towns of Ifakara and Mahenge. Construction work began in November 2012 and was completed in February 2017. It was innagurated by President John Magufuli on May 5, 2018.

== Significance ==
Before the construction of Kilombero Bridge, crossing the Kilombero River was a challenge as it would reliably flood in the rainy season, becoming impassable. Previously, the only way to cross was the Kilombero was by ferry which would have long lines and wait times. With the bridge connecting towns and communities together, it has improved almost all aspects of life for those who use it. Since its construction, it has helped boost the local economy by providing a safe and reliable way to cross the Kilombero river. This has attracted the eye of investors that have created new businesses and jobs in the surrounding area. The bridge has since become a landmark and a tourist attraction, further adding to the economy of the region.

== Challenges ==
The biggest challenge to the construction of Kilombero bridge was the rugged and remote terrain of the Kilombero River basin. The construction crews had to rely on deliveries of various construction materials by air, land, and water.

The rainy season was another challenge as the Kilombero River regularly floods, causing roads to be washed away or become impassable. Water runoff and subsequent diffusion of chemicals into the Kilombero River from the construction of the bridge was a concern and project managers relied on "meticulous planning and the implementation of sustainable construction practices to minimize the project’s ecological footprint."

Financial worries were also of concern. The construction team had to minimize costs without compromising structural quality. The project's team worked with international development partners and government agencies to ensure a secure and viable revenue stream, and one that was lacking corruption.

== Future Plans ==
Additional lane construction, access road improvement, and safety feature enhancement are all part of the Kilombero Bridge's future. There are also plans to better integrate the bridge into the wider regional transportation network. which will require the construction of feeder roads and inter-modal hubs. Industrial parks and logistic centers are planned surrounding the bridge.
