= Urughu =

Ward in Iramba, Singida, Tanzania

Urughu Kata ya Urughu
- Ward
- Location within Tanzania
- Coordinates: 4.6552961°S 34.19019842°E
- Country: Tanzania
- Region: Singida Region
- District: Iramba District
- Ward: Urughu

Population (2016)
  - Total: 14,682
- Time zone: UTC+3 (EAT)

Urughu is an administrative ward in the Iramba District of the Singida Region of Tanzania. In 2016 the Tanzania National Bureau of Statistics report there were 14,682 people in the ward, from 13,380 in 2012.
