= Kinampanda =

Coordinates: 4°24′S 34°31′E

Kinampanda is an administrative ward in the Iramba district of the Singida Region of Tanzania. According to the 2002 census, the ward has a total population of 13,699.
