= Mpambala =

Coordinates: 4.06108°S 34.57274°E

Mpambala is an administrative ward in the Mkalama District of the Singida Region of Tanzania. According to the 2002 census, the ward had a total population of 10,882. According to the 2012 census, the population had increased to 11,192.
