= Mwangeza =

Coordinates: 4.11053°S 34.82221°E

Mwangeza is an administrative ward in the Mkalama District of the Singida Region of Tanzania. According to the 2002 census, the ward has a total population of 12,445. According to the 2012 census, the population had increased to 19,258.
