= Anthony Diallo =

Tanzanian politician (born 1956)

Member of the Tanzanian Parliament
- In office 2000–2010
- Constituency: Ilemela

Personal details
- Born: 25 December 1956 (age 69) Dodoma, Tanganyika Territory
- Party: CCM
- Education: University of Phoenix (BS-eB) (MM-I); Newcastle University (MBA), (DBA)

Anthony Mwandu Diallo (born December 25, 1956) is a Tanzanian politician who served in the National Assembly of Tanzania, representing Ilemela constituency, from 1995 until October 2010 general elections when he lost to a Chama cha Demokrasia na Maendeleo (CHADEMA) candidate.

Diallo started being a member in the National Assembly 1995 and he was immediately appointed Deputy Minister of Industry and Trade from 2000 to 2001 and then Deputy Minister of Water and Livestock from 2001 to 2005. He was appointed as Minister of National Resources and Tourism on January 4, 2006, serving in that position until he was named Minister of Livestock Development on October 15, 2006. He remained in the latter position until February 12, 2008. He left the cabinet so that he could focus more on his businesses, which include a newspaper, a radio station and a television station, and to improve media performance.

Diallo has been a member of the National Executive Council of the Chama Cha Mapinduzi (CCM) party since 2002.

Diallo is a qualified Services marketing and Entrepreneurship specialist; his area of specialization include e-Business, e-Government and systems implementation. With 12 years of continuous public service management and 20 years of management in the field of manufacturing, procurement and production planning. After completing secondary education, he embarked on a series of specialty studies leading the acquisition of management skills and manufacturing in the fields of Engineering Technology.

Diallo was the founding partner of dm Investment co. Ltd; a company, which by 1992 was among the largest engineering manufacturing entity in Africa with turnover of US$2.2 million; at that time, only the Egyptian and South African military had the largest engineering complexes in the African continent. dm Investments Co. Ltd., until its wind up in 1994, manufactured SAHARA brand of electrical appliances, agricultural machinery, single stroke diesel engines and industrial machineries for the agricultural processing industries. Before the liberalization of the Tanzania economy, dm Investment was the most sophisticated manufacturing firm in Africa and the first to deploy and use Computer-Numerically Controlled machine tools (CNC) in Africa and employed over 300 engineers/scientists and technicians at its Nyakato factory in the city of Mwanza in Tanzania.

Diallo holds a Bachelor of Science (BS-eB) Degree in e-Business from the University of Phoenix, a Masters of Business Administration (MBA) degree from the University of Newcastle, a Master of International Management degree from the University of Phoenix (MM-I) and a Doctorate in Business Administration (DBA) from the University of Newcastle (2008). He also holds a Postgraduate Diploma in Technology Management from Maastricht School of Management, NL and attended the six-week Advanced Management Program of Harvard Business School, Boston, US (1994).
