= John Magufuli =

President of Tanzania from 2015 to 2021

His Excellency John Magufuli
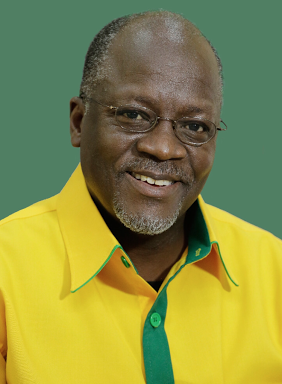
- Magufuli in 2015

5th President of Tanzania
- In office 5 November 2015 – 17 March 2021
- Prime Minister: Kassim Majaliwa
- Vice President: Samia Suluhu
- Preceded by: Jakaya Kikwete
- Succeeded by: Samia Suluhu

Chairman of Southern African Development Community
- In office 17 August 2019 – 17 August 2020
- Preceded by: Hage Geingob
- Succeeded by: Filipe Nyusi

Minister of Works, Transport and Communications
- In office 28 November 2010 – 5 November 2015
- Prime Minister: Mizengo Pinda
- Preceded by: Shukuru Kawambwa
- Succeeded by: Makame Mbarawa
- In office November 2000 – 21 December 2005
- Prime Minister: Frederick Sumaye
- Succeeded by: Basil Mramba

Minister of Livestock and Fisheries
- In office 13 February 2008 – 6 November 2010
- Prime Minister: Mizengo Pinda
- Preceded by: Anthony Diallo
- Succeeded by: David Mathayo David

Minister of Lands and Human Settlements
- In office 6 January 2006 – 13 February 2008
- Prime Minister: Edward Lowassa
- Succeeded by: John Chiligati

Member of Parliament for Biharamulo East and Chato
- In office November 1995 – July 2015
- Succeeded by: Medard Kalemani

Personal details
- Born: John Pombe Joseph Magufuli; 29 October 1959 Chato, Tanganyika (now Tanzania)
- Died: 17 March 2021 (aged 61) Dar es Salaam, Tanzania
- Cause of death: Officially atrial fibrillation, for details see Death
- Party: Chama Cha Mapinduzi
- Spouse: Janeth Magufuli
- Children: 7
- Education: University of Dar es Salaam (BS, MS, PhD)

Military service
- Allegiance: Tanzania
- Branch/service: Tanzanian Army
- Years of service: 1983–1984

John Pombe Joseph Magufuli (29 October 1959 – 17 March 2021) was a Tanzanian politician who served as the country's fifth president, serving from 2015 until his death in 2021. He served as Minister of Works, Transport and Communications from 2000 to 2005 and 2010 to 2015 and was chairman of the Southern African Development Community from 2019 to 2020.

First elected as a Member of Parliament in 1995, he served in the Cabinet of Tanzania as Deputy Minister of Works from 1995 to 2000, Minister of Works from 2000 to 2005, Minister of Lands and Human Settlement from 2006 to 2008, Minister of Livestock and Fisheries from 2008 to 2010, and as Minister of Works for a second time from 2010 to 2015.

Running as the candidate of Chama Cha Mapinduzi (CCM), the country's dominant party, Magufuli won the October 2015 presidential election and was sworn in on 5 November 2015; he was re-elected in 2020. He ran on a platform of reducing government corruption and spending while also investing in Tanzania's industries, but his rule had autocratic tendencies, as seen in restrictions on freedom of speech, restrictions on LGBTQ rights, and a crackdown on members of the political opposition and civil society groups. Despite all the accusations, a spokesman for the ruling party assured that Magufuli would not remain in power beyond the two limits allowed by the constitution.

Under his presidency, Tanzania experienced one of the strongest economic growths on the continent (6% on average per year according to the IMF) and moved from the category of lower-low income countries to lower-middle income countries.

Contrary to leaders elsewhere in the world, Magufuli ordered COVID-19 testing to stop and resisted calls to implement public health measures during the COVID-19 pandemic in Tanzania. He also expressed distrust of American- and European-developed vaccines, preferring to rely on faith to protect his nation. Magufuli's approach has been characterised as COVID-19 denialism.

His death on 17 March 2021 was attributed by the government to a long-standing heart issue. He was succeeded by his vice-president, Samia Suluhu.

== Education ==
John Magufuli was born in 1959 in northwestern Tanzania (then Tanganyika), on the shores of Lake Victoria, into a poor family. He lived in a small thatched house, looking after the cattle and selling milk and fish to support his family.

Magufuli started his education at the Chato Primary School from 1967 to 1974 and went on to the Katoke Seminary in Biharamulo for his secondary education from 1975 to 1977 before relocating to Lake Secondary School in 1977 and graduating in 1978. He joined Mkwawa High School for his Advanced level studies in 1979 and graduated in 1981. That same year he joined Mkwawa College of Education (a constituent college of the University of Dar es Salaam) for a Diploma in Education Science, majoring in chemistry, Mathematics, and Education.

Magufuli earned his Bachelor of Science in education degree, majoring in Chemistry and Mathematics as teaching subjects from the University of Dar es Salaam in 1988. He also earned his master's degree, and doctorate degrees in chemistry from the University of Dar es Salaam in 1994 and 2009, respectively. In late 2019, he was awarded an honorary doctorate by the University of Dodoma for improving the economy of the country.

== Early life and political career ==
Magufuli ventured into elective politics after a short period as a teacher at The Sengerema Secondary School between 1982 and 1983. He taught chemistry and mathematics. Later on, he quit his teaching job and was employed by The Nyanza Cooperative Union Limited as an industrial chemist. He remained there from 1989 to 1995, when he was elected as Member of Parliament (MP) representing Chato district. He was appointed Deputy Minister for Works in his first term as MP. He retained his seat in the 2000 election and was promoted to a full ministerial position under the same docket. After President Jakaya Mrisho Kikwete was requested to take office, he moved John Joseph Magufuli to the post of Minister of Lands and Human Settlement on 4 January 2006. Subsequently, he served as Minister of Livestock and Fisheries from 2008 to 2010 and again as Minister of Works from 2010 to 2015.

=== 2015 presidential election ===
On 12 July 2015, Magufuli was nominated as CCM's presidential candidate for the 2015 election, after winning a majority vote in the final round of the primary over two opponents: Justice Minister and former United Nations Deputy Secretary-General Asha-Rose Migiro, and the African Union Ambassador to the United States, Amina Salum Ali.

Although Magufuli faced a strong challenge from opposition candidate and previous CCM political party member Edward Lowassa in the election, held on 25 October 2015, Magufuli was declared the winner by the National Electoral Commission (NEC) on 29 October; he received 58% of the vote. His running mate, Samia Suluhu, was also declared vice-president. He was sworn in on 5 November 2015.

=== 2020 presidential election ===
In July 2020, Magufuli was nominated as the CCM's presidential candidate in elections scheduled for October 2020. His nomination was not opposed after the expulsion from the party earlier in the year of Bernard Membe, a former foreign minister who had planned to challenge the nomination. He received the highest votes and was therefore re-elected to extend his presidency until 2025 for a second term.

According to Al Jazeera, "The election was marred by allegations of arrests of candidates and protesters, restrictions on agents of political parties to access polling stations, multiple voting, pre-ticking of ballots, and widespread blocking of social media." A local elections watchdog group noted a heavy deployment of military and police whose conduct created a "climate of fear". Writing in the Journal of Democracy, political scientist Dan Paget stated that "The CCM sweep was an authoritarian landslide, achieved through electoral manipulation that was unprecedented in both scale and audacity. This was accompanied by high levels of violent oppression".

== Presidency ==
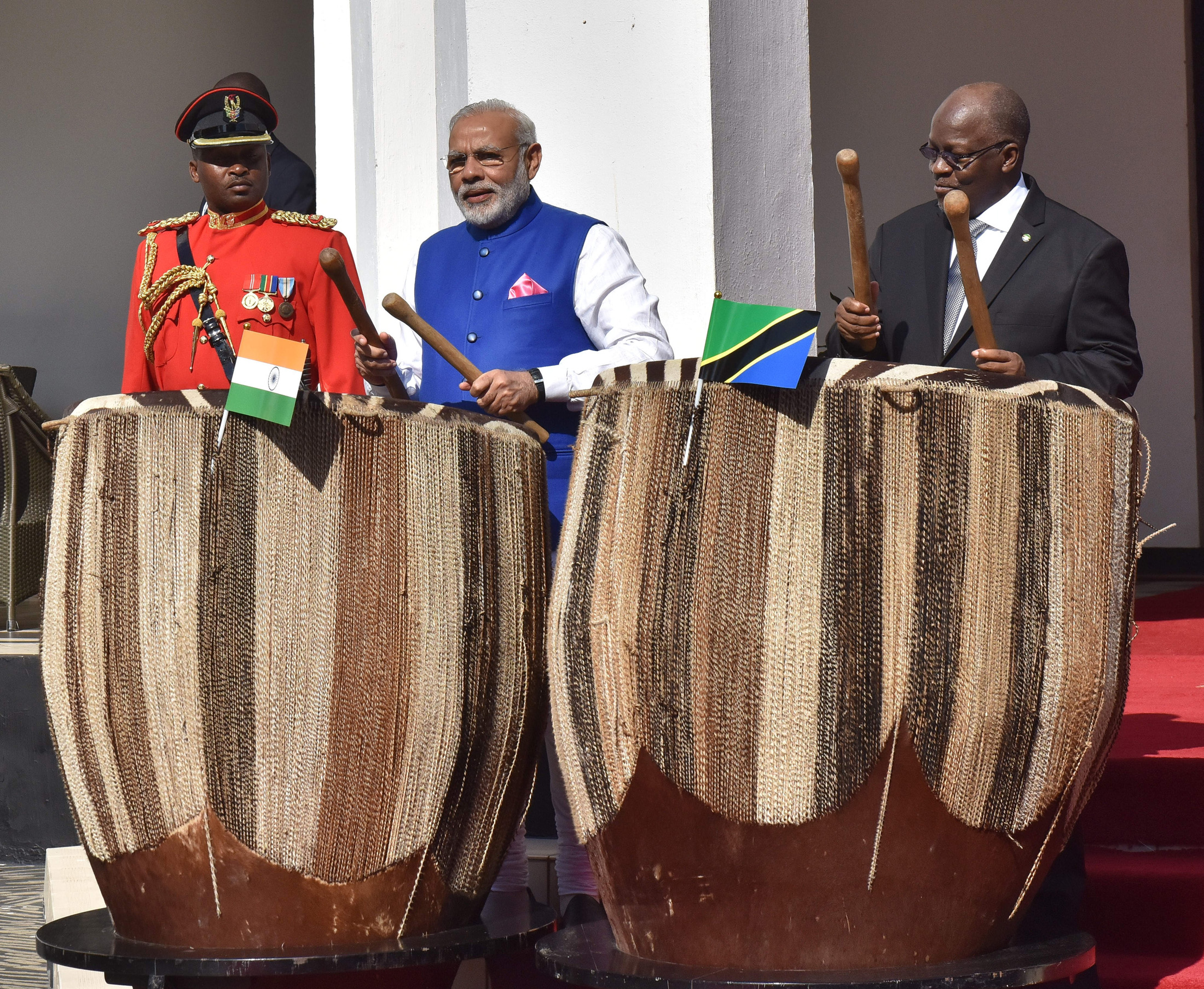
Magufuli with Indian Prime Minister Narendra Modi, 10 July 2016

After taking office, Magufuli immediately began to impose measures to curb government spending, such as barring unnecessary foreign travel by government officials, using cheaper vehicles and board rooms for transport and meetings respectively, shrinking the delegation for a tour of the Commonwealth from 50 people to 4, dropping its sponsorship of a World AIDS Day exhibition in favour of purchasing AIDS medication, banning officials from flying first and business class, and discouraging lavish events and parties by public institutions (such as cutting the budget of a state dinner inaugurating the new parliamentary session). Magufuli reduced his own salary from US$15,000 to US$4,000 per month.

Magufuli suspended the country's Independence Day festivities for 2015, in favour of a national cleanup campaign to help reduce the spread of cholera. He personally participated in the cleanup efforts, having stated that it was "so shameful that we are spending huge amounts of money to celebrate 54 years of independence when our people are dying of cholera". The cost savings were to be invested in improving hospitals and sanitation in the country.

On 10 December 2015, more than a month after taking office, Magufuli announced his cabinet. Its size was reduced from 30 ministries to 19 to help reduce costs.

On 12 April 2016, Magufuli conducted his first foreign visit to Rwanda, where he met his counterpart Paul Kagame and inaugurated the new bridge and one-stop border post at Rusumo. Magufuli also attended the memorial for the 22nd anniversary of the Rwandan genocide.

In July 2016, Tanzania banned shisha smoking, with Magufuli citing its health effects among youth as the reason. In March 2017, Tanzania banned the export of unprocessed ores, in an effort to encourage domestic smelting. In January 2018, Magufuli issued a directive ordering the suspension of registration for foreign merchant ships, following recent incidents surrounding the seizure of overseas shipments of illegal goods (particularly drugs and weapons) being transported under the flag. Tanzania and Zanzibar had gained reputations for being flags of convenience. In the same year, Magufuli introduced a free education for all the government schools in 2016 without paying fees.

The country has amended the laws governing the award of mining contracts, giving itself the right to renegotiate or terminate them in the event of proven fraud. The new legislation also removes the right of mining companies to resort to international arbitration. The tax dispute with Acacia Mining, accused of having significantly undervalued its gold production for years, finally resulted in an agreement: Tanzania obtains 16% of the shares in the mines held by the multinational. In May 2020, Acacia Mining paid $100M to the government to end dispute as the first tranche of the $300M. However, this anti-corruption policy has also "frightened investors, who now fear they will have to deal with Tanzanian justice, and weakened growth", according to Zitto Kabwe, one of the leaders of the opposition Alliance for Change and Transparency (ACT). With one of the highest economic growth rates on the African continent (5.8% in 2018 and an estimated 6% for 2019 according to the IMF), the Tanzanian government is embarking on a vast programme of infrastructure development, particularly rail infrastructure. The small fishing port of Bagamoyo, to which US$10 billion of investment has been allocated, is expected to become the largest port in Africa by 2030.

=== Infrastructure ===
Magufuli's government worked on various infrastructure projects targeting economic development. Projects include the addition of half a dozen Air Tanzania planes as a way of reviving the national carrier, the expansion of Terminal III of Julius Nyerere International Airport, construction of Tanzania Standard Gauge Railway, Mfugale Flyover, Julius Nyerere Hydropower Station, Kijazi Interchange]], new Selander Bridge, Kigongo-Busisi Bridge, Huduma Bora Za afya, Vituo Bora Za Afya, expansion of Port of Dar es Salaam, Dodoma Bus Terminal, liquefied natural gas plant, water project, wind farm project, Uhuru Hospital project, gold refinery plant, and Magufuli Bus Terminal.

Magufuli received the nickname "The Bulldozer" in reference to his roadworks projects, but the term was also used about his moves to reduce spending and corruption within the government. Following Magufuli's initial rounds of cuts post-inauguration, the hashtag "#WhatWouldMagufuliDo" was used by Twitter users to demonstrate their own austerity measures inspired by the president.

His policies are unusual on a continent where, in general, "corruption and embezzlement of public funds are a way of life" in ruling circles, according to the daily The Citizen.

=== Human rights ===
World map highlighting countries visited by Magufuli while president

Magufuli's government was accused of repressing opposition to his leadership, including laws restricting opposition rallies, the suspension of the Swahili-language Mawio newspaper in 2016 for publishing "false and inflammatory" reporting regarding the nullification of election results in Zanzibar, threatening to shut down radio and television stations that did not pay licence fees, and a 2018 bill requiring blogs and other forms of online content providers to hold government licences with content restrictions. Magufuli's ban on opposition rallies stood for six years until January 2023. His government was publicly criticized by the Tanzania Episcopal Conference (TEC) for taking measures that suppress constitutional freedoms and, in the view of bishops, represent a threat to national unity. Additionally, he condemned the attempted assassination of opposition leader Tundu Lissu in 2017 and said he was praying for his recovery.

People in Tanzania have been arrested for cyberbullying the president.

==== LGBT intimidation and abuses ====
People convicted of same-sex liaisons in Tanzania can be jailed for up to 30 years. In October 2016, the government banned HIV/AIDS outreach projects and closed U.S.-funded programs that provide HIV testing, condoms, and medical care to the gay community. The countrywide closure of private HIV clinics began soon afterward. In late 2018, Magufuli initiated a nationwide crackdown, threatening to arrest and deport anyone campaigning for gay rights and making it difficult to find a lawyer who will defend cases of violence against LGBTQ people.

Paul Makonda, Magufuli's regional commissioner for Dar es Salaam, stated in 2016: "If there's a homosexual who has a Facebook account, or with an Instagram account, all those who 'follow' him — it is very clear that they are just as guilty as the homosexual". Two years later, he announced that a committee of 17 members consisting of police, lawyers and doctors, had been formed to identify homosexuals. Within one day of the announcement authorities reportedly received 5,763 messages from the public, with more than 100 names. Hamisi Kigwangalla, the country's deputy health minister, said he supports the use of 'anal exams' to prove whether someone is having gay sex. The test is widely considered to be a violation of human rights by medical experts.

=== Health ===
==== Birth control ====
In September 2018, Magufuli told a rally: "Those going for family planning are lazy ... they are afraid they will not be able to feed their children. They do not want to work hard to feed a large family and that is why they opt for birth controls and end up with one or two children only." He urged people not to listen to those advising about birth control, some of it coming from foreigners, because it has sinister motives. The statement has drawn criticism from Amnesty International and others. In July 2019, Magufuli urged women to "set your ovaries free". Despite his opinion on contraception, Magufuli had shown support for a decades-old law which permitted schools to expel pregnant students, stating that he believed "After getting pregnant, you are done".

==== COVID-19 ====
Magufuli promoted COVID-19 misinformation and misinformation related to vaccination during the pandemic in Tanzania. Magufuli spoke against the possibility of closing churches, stating: "That's where there is true healing. Corona is the devil and it cannot survive in the body of Jesus," reported The Economist in March 2020.

By May 2020, Magufuli and Dar es Salaam regional commissioner Paul Makonda announced that the disease had been defeated by national prayer, and called for a public celebration. "The corona disease has been eliminated thanks to God", Magufuli told the church congregation in Dodoma, the country's capital. The World Health Organization (WHO) has questioned the government's approach to COVID-19.

Magufuli instructed security forces to blindly test coronavirus PCR test kits for quality on goats, papaya, sheep, and motor oil. All of them, he said, had been found to be positive for COVID-19. The last official data on the coronavirus in Tanzania, under President Magufuli, was published in late April 2020. Magufuli had dismissed the head of the national laboratory, and the distribution of non-governmental information on the spread of the virus had become a crime. He disputed the effectiveness of face masks and testing. In July 2020, regulations were introduced to forbid the publication of "information with regards to the outbreak of a deadly or contagious disease in the country or elsewhere without the approval of the respective authorities", with fines for breaches. As a result, many doctors felt that they were unable to officially diagnose COVID-19 out of fear of the government.

Magufuli said in a January 2021 speech: "Vaccinations are dangerous. If white people were able to come up with vaccinations, a vaccination for AIDS would have been found." Instead, Magufuli urged steam inhalation and herbal medicine, neither of which is approved by the WHO for the treatment of COVID-19. However, Magufuli partially changed his position in the next month. After months of discouraging their use, he publicly asked Tanzanians to put on face masks as a precautionary measure against COVID-19. At the same time, he conditioned that only Tanzanian-made masks should be used.

== Death ==
Magufuli's final public appearance was on 27 February 2021, leading to speculation over his health. His death on 17 March 2021 at 6 p.m. EAT (15:00 UTC) was announced in a statement read out by vice-president Samia Suluhu Hassan, who was sworn in as his successor two days later. He was the first Tanzanian president to die in office. 14 days of national mourning were declared, with flags flying at half-mast nationwide.

The government attributed his death to a heart condition accompanied by a decade-long chronic atrial fibrillation, although opposition figures and some media sources alleged that Magufuli had contracted COVID-19.

Magufuli's remains were laid in state at the Uhuru Stadium in Dar es Salaam on 20 March. His state funeral was held two days later at the Jamhuri Stadium in Dodoma, and he was buried in his hometown of Chato on 26 March.

== Personal life ==
He was married to Janeth Magufuli, a primary school teacher, with whom he had seven children. He was a devout Catholic.

== Honours and awards ==
=== Honours ===
Year	Country	Order
2024	Tanzania	Order of Mwalimu Julius Kambarage Nyerere (posthumous)

=== Awards ===
- 2020: Top Tanzania Assemblies of God Award

=== Honorary academic awards ===
Year	University	Country	Honour
2019	University of Dodoma	Tanzania	Honoris Causa

== See also ==
- List of heads of the executive by approval rating
- List of presidential trips made by John Magufuli

Political offices
Preceded by Anthony Diallo	Minister of Livestock and Fisheries; 2008–2010	Succeeded by David Mathayo David
Preceded by Shukuru Kawambwa	Minister of Works, Transport and Communications; 2010–2015	Succeeded by Makame Mbarawa
Preceded by Jakaya Kikwete	President of Tanzania; 2015–2021	Succeeded by Samia Suluhu
Party political offices
Preceded by Jakaya Kikwete	CCM nominee for President of Tanzania; 2015, 2020	Most recent
