= Gumanga =

Administrative ward

Coordinates: 4°14′S 34°36′E

Gumanga is an administrative ward in the Mkalama District of the Singida Region of Tanzania. According to the 2002 census, the ward has a total population of 9,896. According to the 2012 census, the population had increased to 10,948.
