= New Ruvu Bridge =

New Ruvu Bridge Daraja jipya la Ruvu (Swahili)
- Coordinates: 6°41′26″S 38°41′40″E
- Carries: A7 road (2 lanes)
- Crosses: Ruvu River
- Locale: Coast Region, Tanzania
- Owner: Government of Tanzania

Characteristics
- Total length: 135 metres (443 ft)

History
- Engineering design by: NORPLAN Tanzania
- Constructed by: Chico (China)
- Construction end: August 2008
- Construction cost: TSh 44 billion
- Inaugurated: May 2009
- Replaces: Ruvu Bridge

The New Ruvu Bridge is a bridge in Tanzania that crosses the Ruvu River. It was inaugurated by the Tanzanian Vice President Ali Mohamed Shein in 2009 It lies on the A7 highway connecting the city of Dar es Salaam to the other regions.
