= Mwanga (Tanzanian ward) =

Coordinates: 4.23573°S 34.86736°E

Mwanga (Tanzanian ward) is an administrative ward in the Mkalama District of the Singida Region of Tanzania.This ward has the following villages Marera, Kidarafa, Msiu, Mwanga, Kidigida, and Msisai. According to the 2002 census, the ward had a total population of 21,474. According to the 2012 census, the population had increased to 26,024.
