= Ibaga =

Coordinates: 4.08523°S 34.60309°E

Ibaga is an administrative ward in the Mkalama District of the Singida Region of Tanzania. According to the 2002 census, the ward has a total population of 10,672. According to the 2012 census, the population had increased to 11,712.
