= Iramba people =

Ethnic group from Shinyanga and Singida Regions of Tanzania

The Anilamba (also called Nyilamba) are a Bantu ethnic and linguistic group based in Kishapu District of Shinyanga Region and Iramba District of Singida Region in central Tanzania. In 1987 the Nilamba population was estimated to number 400,000, with 50,000 other speakers of the Nilamba language. A 2013 estimate placed the total population at over 450,000.
