= Mkapa Bridge =

Longest bridge in Tanzania across the Rufiji River

Mkapa Bridge Daraja la Mkapa (Swahili)
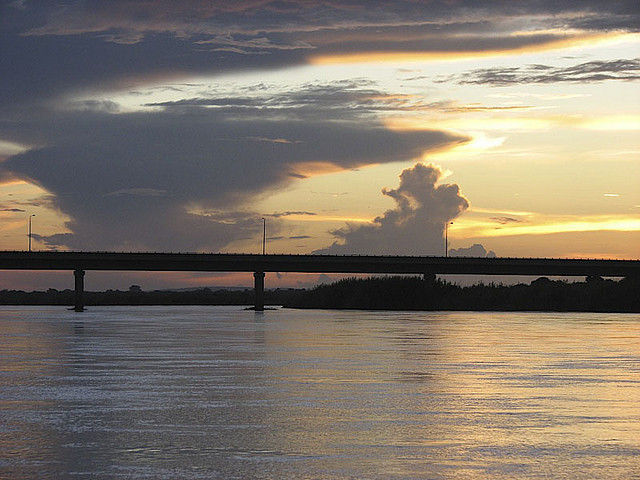
- Coordinates: 8°0′46″S 38°58′10″E
- Carries: B2 road (2 lanes)
- Crosses: Rufiji River
- Locale: Ikwiriri, Tanzania
- Other name(s): Rufiji Bridge
- Owner: Government of Tanzania
- Website: www.mwtc.go.tz

Characteristics
- Total length: 970 metres (3,180 ft)

History
- Designer: H. P. Gauff Ingenieure GmbH & Co (Germany)
- Constructed by: Impresa Ing. Fortunato Federici S.p.A. (Italy)
- Construction cost: US$ 30 million
- Inaugurated: 2 August 2003

Mkapa Bridge is the longest bridge in Tanzania across the Rufiji River. It was financed through a US$30 million loan from the Kuwait Fund, OPEC and the Government of Saudi Arabia.

At inauguration in 2003, it was amongst the longest road bridges in east and southern Africa. The construction of the bridge has helped immensely in connecting the southern regions to other important areas of the country. It is named after Benjamin Mkapa, the third President of Tanzania.
