= Msingi =

Coordinates: 4°20′S 34°34′E

Msingi is an administrative ward in the Mkalama District of the Singida Region of Tanzania. According to the 2002 census, the ward has a total population of 6,439. According to the 2012 census, the population had increased to 7,289.
