= Nkinto =

Tanzanian administrative ward

Coordinates: 4.14459°S 34.76695°E

Nkinto is an administrative ward in the Mkalama District of the Singida Region of Tanzania. According to the 2002 census, the ward has a total population of 13,367. According to the 2012 census, the population had decreased to 10,372.
