= Mbutu Bridge =

Mbutu Bridge Daraja la Mbutu (Swahili)
- Coordinates: 4°15′38.73″S 33°53′59.63″E
- Locale: Igunga, Tanzania
- Owner: Government of Tanzania

Characteristics
- Total length: 42 metres (138 ft)

History
- Construction end: November 2013 (projected)
- Construction cost: TSh 11 billion

Location
- Interactive map of Mbutu Bridge

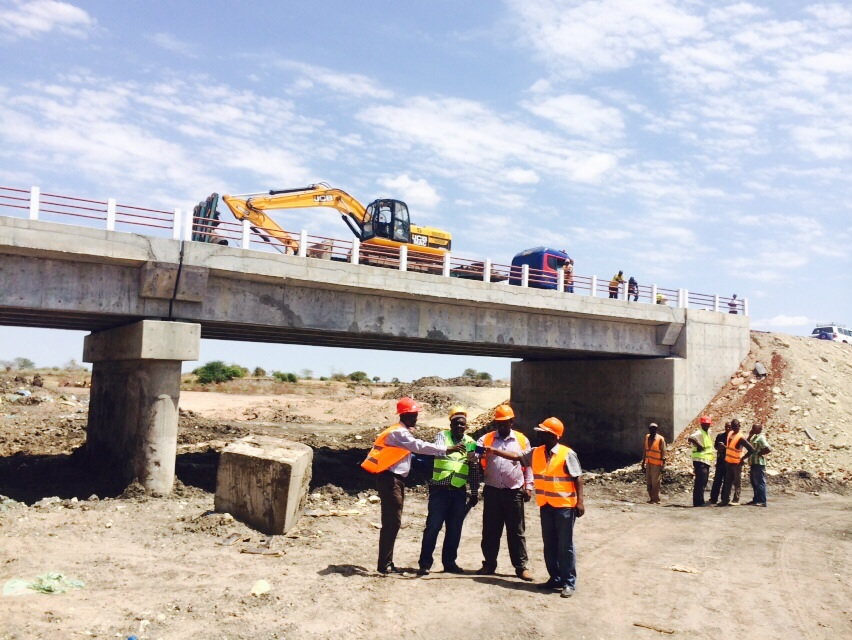

Mbutu Bridge is a bridge constructed in Tabora Region, Tanzania that will link Mbutu with Igunga.

== Description ==
The construction of the bridge was carried out by the joint-venture company Mbutu Bridge JV. The JV consisted of 11 local contractors, the main contractors being Mac Contractors Ltd of Dares Salaam, Milembe Contractors of Dar Es Salaam, and Mayanga Contractors of Mwanza.

The project entailed 12 m piles supports (56 nos) and a two-span bridge of 21 m each. The total length of the bridge is 42 m. 3 km of approach roads was also constructed.
