= Ilunda =

Coordinates: 4.36328°S 34.79815°E

Ilunda is an administrative ward in the Mkalama District of the Singida Region of Tanzania. According to the 2002 census, the ward has a total population of 19,465. According to the 2012 census, the population had increased to 21,622.
