= Iramba language =

Bantu language spoken in Tanzania

Iramba
- Nilamba
- Native to: Tanzania
- Ethnicity: Nilamba, Iambi
- Native speakers: 682,000 (2016)
- Language family: Niger–Congo?: Atlantic–Congo; Volta-Congo; Benue–Congo; Bantoid; Southern Bantoid; Bantu; Nyaturu-Nilamba-Isanzu; Iramba

Language codes
- ISO 639-3: nim
- Glottolog: nila1242
- Guthrie code: F.31

Iramba, also known as Nilamba (there is no distinction between [ɾ] and [l]) is a Bantu language spoken by the Nilamba and Iambi people of the Iramba District in the Singida Region of Tanzania.

The 50,000 Iambi speak a slightly divergent dialect, sometimes listed as a distinct language. On the other hand, the Isanzu language is sometimes included as a dialect.

== Name variants ==
Forms of the name occur with and without the prefix ni- or i-, as well as iki- (Swahili ki-) as the noun-class prefix for 'language', and variation of r ~ l ~ ly in the root. This results in many superficial variants, including Nilamba, Niramba, Nilyamba, Nyilamba, Ikinilamba, Ikiniramba, Ilamba, Iramba, Kinilamba, Kiniramba; there is also Nilambari.
