= Nduguti =

Administrative area in Tanzania with declining population from 2002 - 2012

Coordinates: 4°18′S 34°42′E

Nduguti is an administrative ward in the Mkalama District of the Singida Region of Tanzania. According to the 2002 census, the ward has a total population of 15,955. According to the 2012 census, the population had decreased to 8,638.
