= Iguguno =

Ward in Mkalama, Singida, Tanzania

Iguguno Kata ya Iguguno
- Ward
- Location within Tanzania
- Coordinates: 4.56681032°S 34.6283054°E
- Country: Tanzania
- Region: Singida Region
- District: Mkalama District
- Ward: Iguguno

Population (2016)
  - Total: 21,548
- Time zone: UTC+3 (EAT)

Iguguno is an administrative ward in the Mkalama District of the Singida Region of Tanzania. The town is popular business center for crops like cereals and sunflower. It is arguably the most developed town in the district. There are a few schools both primary and secondary in the town. In 2016 the Tanzania National Bureau of Statistics report there were 21,548 people in the ward, from 25,860 in 2012.
