= Tanzania National Roads Agency =

Tanzanian road transportation agency

- Wakala wa Barabara Tanzania (Swahili)

Agency overview
- Formed: 1 July 2000; 26 years ago
- Jurisdiction: Government of Tanzania
- Headquarters: 3rd floor 10 Shaaban Robert Road/Garden Avenue Junction; Dar es Salaam, Tanzania; 6°48′42″S 39°17′35″E
- Annual budget: TSh 608.5 billion
- Agency executive: Mohamed Besta, Chief executive
- Parent department: Ministry of Works, Transport and Communication
- Key document: Executive Agencies Act No. 30 of 1997
- Website: www.tanroads.go.tz

The Tanzania National Roads Agency (TANROADS; Swahili: Wakala wa Barabara Tanzania) is a division of the Ministry of Works, Transport and Communications responsible for the management of trunk and regional roads in mainland Tanzania. Established on 1 July 2000, it is one of two agencies tasked with the maintenance of Tanzania's road system, the other being the Tanzania Rural and Urban Roads Agency (TARURA).

== History ==
Tanzania adopted the Road Management Initiative's principles in maintenance management and finance policies in 1987, becoming one of the first countries to do so. The initiative is part of the Sub-Saharan Africa Transportation Policy Program (SSATP), led by the Africa Region Infrastructure Department of the World Bank and the United Nations Economic Commission for Africa. The initiative aimed to improve the maintenance practices and longevity of roads in Sub-Saharan Africa. Initial reforms in Tanzania were not very successful, lacking legal backing. The Parliament of Tanzania passed the Road Tolls Act of 1998 in response, aiming to give road funds legal backing and secure stable funding for road maintenance. The act established the Roads Fund and the Roads Fund Board.

TANROADS was established on 1 July 2000 as part of the reform programme under the Executive Agencies Act of 1997, with the purpose of improving road maintenance.

In 2015, a report from the Controller and Auditor General found that a total of TSh 80 billion (US$42.4 million) was unaccounted for. Of the missing funds, TSh 47 billion (US$24.9 million) out of a TSh 77 billion (US$40.8 million) payment deposited at the Bank of Tanzania could not be accounted for. TSh 33 billion (US$17.5 million) in contractor debt payments were also unaccounted for. In 2021, a special audit report on development funds released by the Bank of Tanzania found irregularities in payments made by TANROADS.

== Functions ==
TANROADS is responsible for the management of mainland Tanzania's trunk and regional roads. The agency's main functions are concerned with road maintenance, rehabilitation, and upgrading. The agency also serves to improve road safety, perform work on district roads upon request from local authorities, maintain a road database, weighbridge operation, and the management of ferry contracts.

== Organisation ==
TANROADS is headed by a chief executive, who is appointed for a five-year term. The chief executive is overseen by the Permanent Secretary, the Ministry of Works, Transport and Communication, and the Roads Fund Board. The Roads Fund Board serves as a ministerial advisory board for TANROADS, appointing a secretariat to manage daily activities. TANROADS has four divisions, each headed by a director: maintenance, development, technical, and finance and administration. The agency manages and owns three subsidiary businesses: TANWEIGH, TANLAB, and Equipment Hire Units.
