= Selander Bridge =

Selander Bridge Daraja la Selander (Swahili)
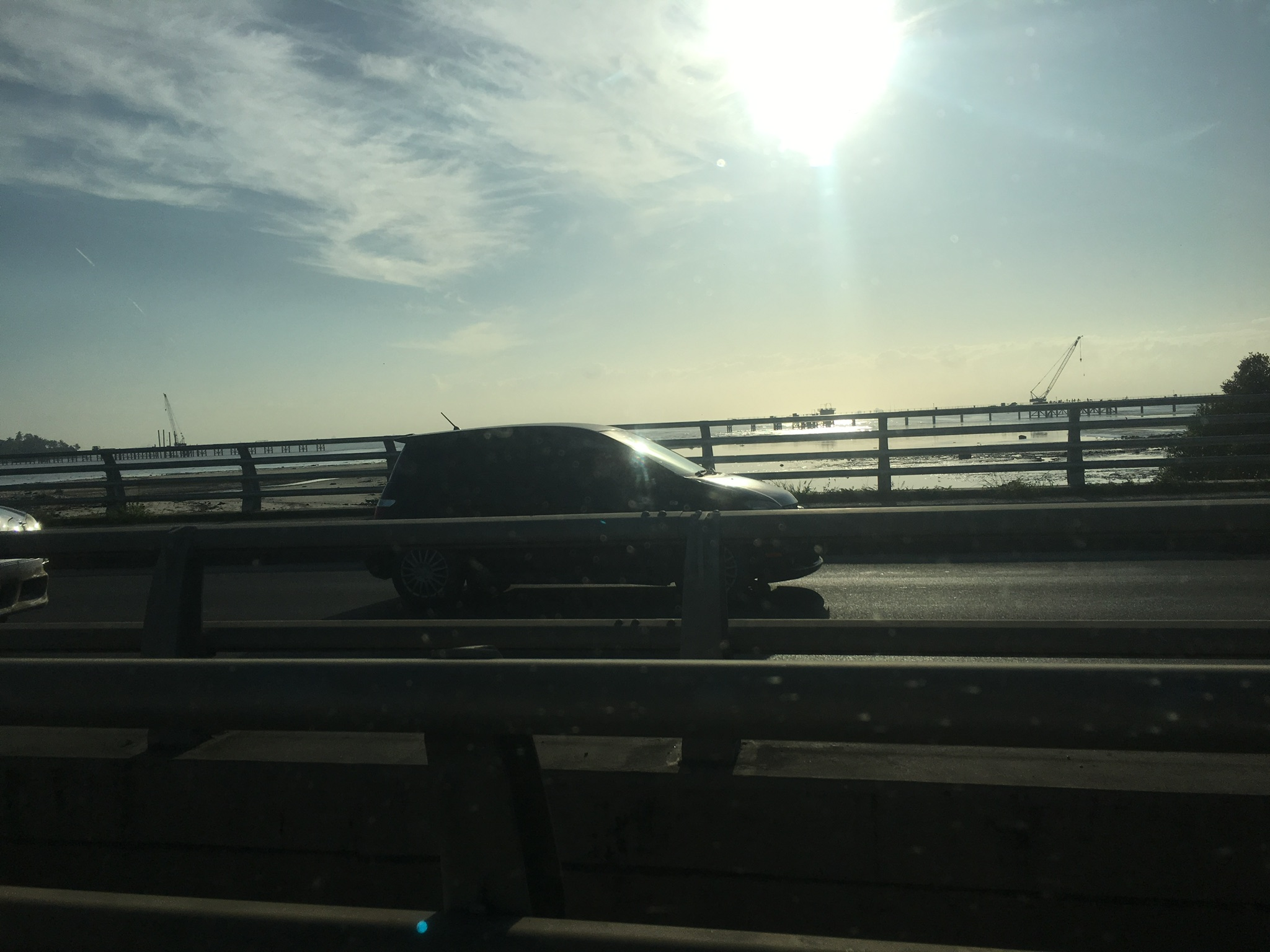
- Coordinates: 6°47′46.69″S 39°16′52.81″E
- Carries: 4 lanes dual carriageway
- Crosses: Msimbazi delta
- Locale: Ali Hassan Mwinyi Road, Oyster Bay, Dar es Salaam, Tanzania
- Owner: Government of Tanzania
- Website: www.mwtc.go.tz

Characteristics
- Total length: 85 metres (279 ft)
- Design life: Modern bridge (1980– )

History
- Constructed by: GS Engineering & Construction
- Opened: 1929

Location
- Interactive map of Selander Bridge

Selander Bridge is a bridge in Dar es Salaam, Tanzania that connects the north west of Dar es Salaam's city centre to the south eastern Oyster Bay neighbourhood.

== History ==
It was first constructed in 1929 and is named after John Einar Selander, Tanganyika's first Director of Public Works.

The present bridge was donated by the government of Japan as a token of cooperation between the governments of Japan and Tanzania, by Japan International Cooperation Agency in 1980 and was its first road project in Tanzania. The current four-lane bridge was built in the same year. It lies along the Ali Hassan Mwinyi road.

The new bridge project was implemented with support from the South Korea's Economic Development Cooperation Fund (EDCF), and construction was undertaken by GS Engineering & Construction of South Korea.

== Tanzanite Bridge ==
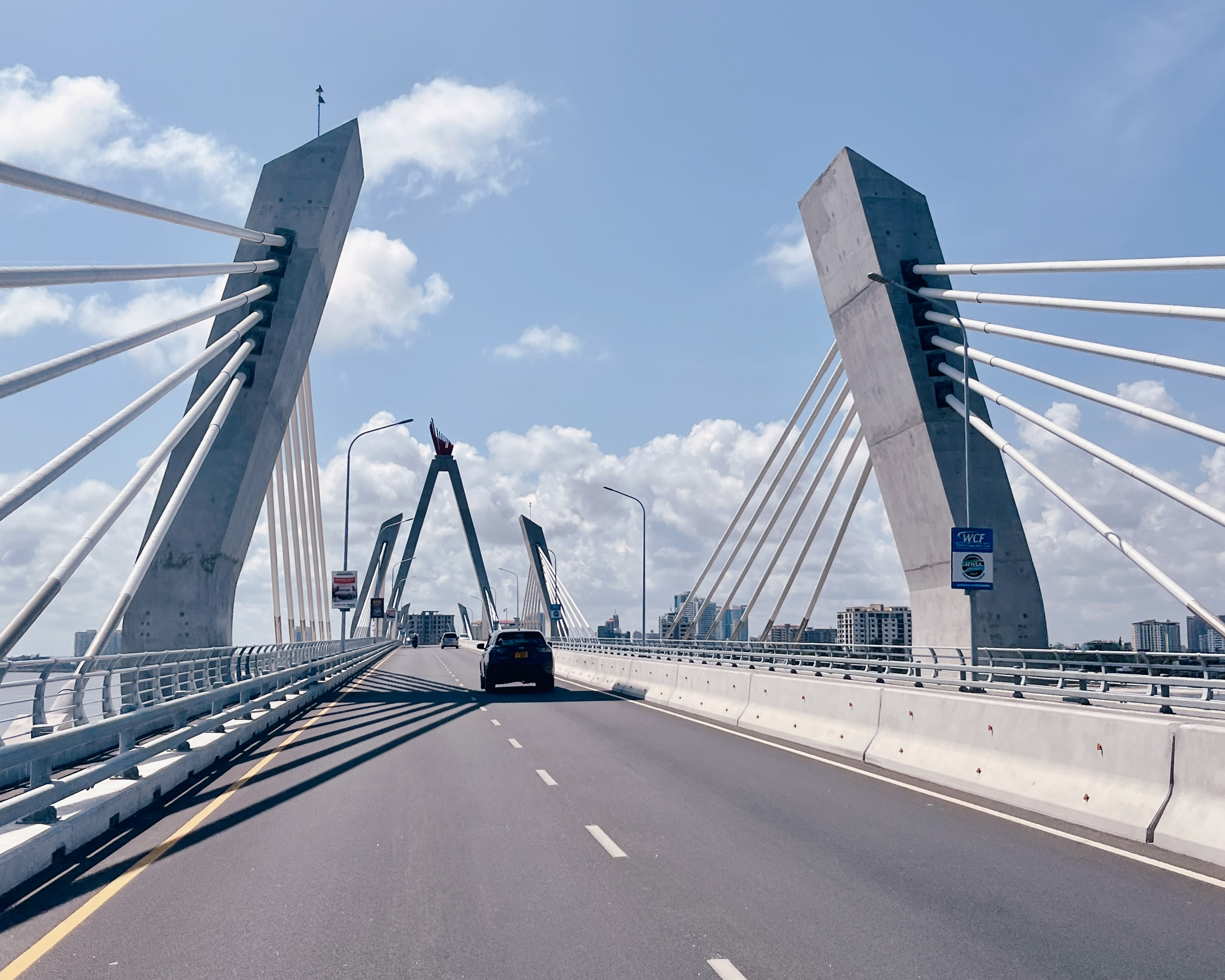
New Selander Bridge.

Construction of the new bridge over the Msimbazi delta near the Indian ocean which costs 258.3 billion Tanzanian shillings, will connect roads linking Aga Khan Hospital and Coco beach. The project will help to reduce the road traffic congestion. As of September 2021, the project had been completed by 93 percent, and was set to be ready by December the same year however, the bridge was completed in Jan 2022 and started its operation on February 1. It was constructed with the concessional loan from the Republic of Korea, EDCF.
