= Manjaro, Tanzania =

Manjaro
- Village
- Interactive map of Manjaro
- Coordinates: 5.41667°S 34.9°E
- Elevation: 1,320 m (4,330 ft)

Manjaro is a populated settlement in the Issuna (Isuna) ward of Ikungi District of the Singida Region of Tanzania. It lies approximately 40 miles (64 km) south of the town of Singida and about 80 miles (130 km) north east of the national capital Dodoma.

Manjaro is not connected to the road network but lies approximately 10 miles (16 km) west of the Issuna which lies on the B141 road and has a station on the Singida branch line.
