= Trans Africa Railway Corporation =

Railway company operating transshipment station in Tanzania

The Trans Africa Railway Corporation is a company that runs the break of gauge transshipment station at Kidatu, Tanzania.

== Gauge ==
To the north of Kidatu is the 1,000 mm (3 ft 3 3/8 in) system of Tanzania, Kenya and Uganda.

To the south of Kitadu is the 1,067 mm (3 ft 6 in) system of TAZARA, Zambia and the rest of southern Africa.

== Transhipment ==
Kitadu is fitted with large cranes which help tranship goods, especially containers, from wagons of one gauge to wagons of another gauge.

== See also ==
- East African Railway Master Plan
- Rail transport in Tanzania
- Transport in Tanzania
- TAZARA
