= Dar es Salaam commuter rail =

Public transit system in Tanzania

Coordinates: 6.81629°S 39.266651°E

Dar es Salaam commuter rail Huduma ya Treni ya Jiji la Dar es Salaam (Swahili)
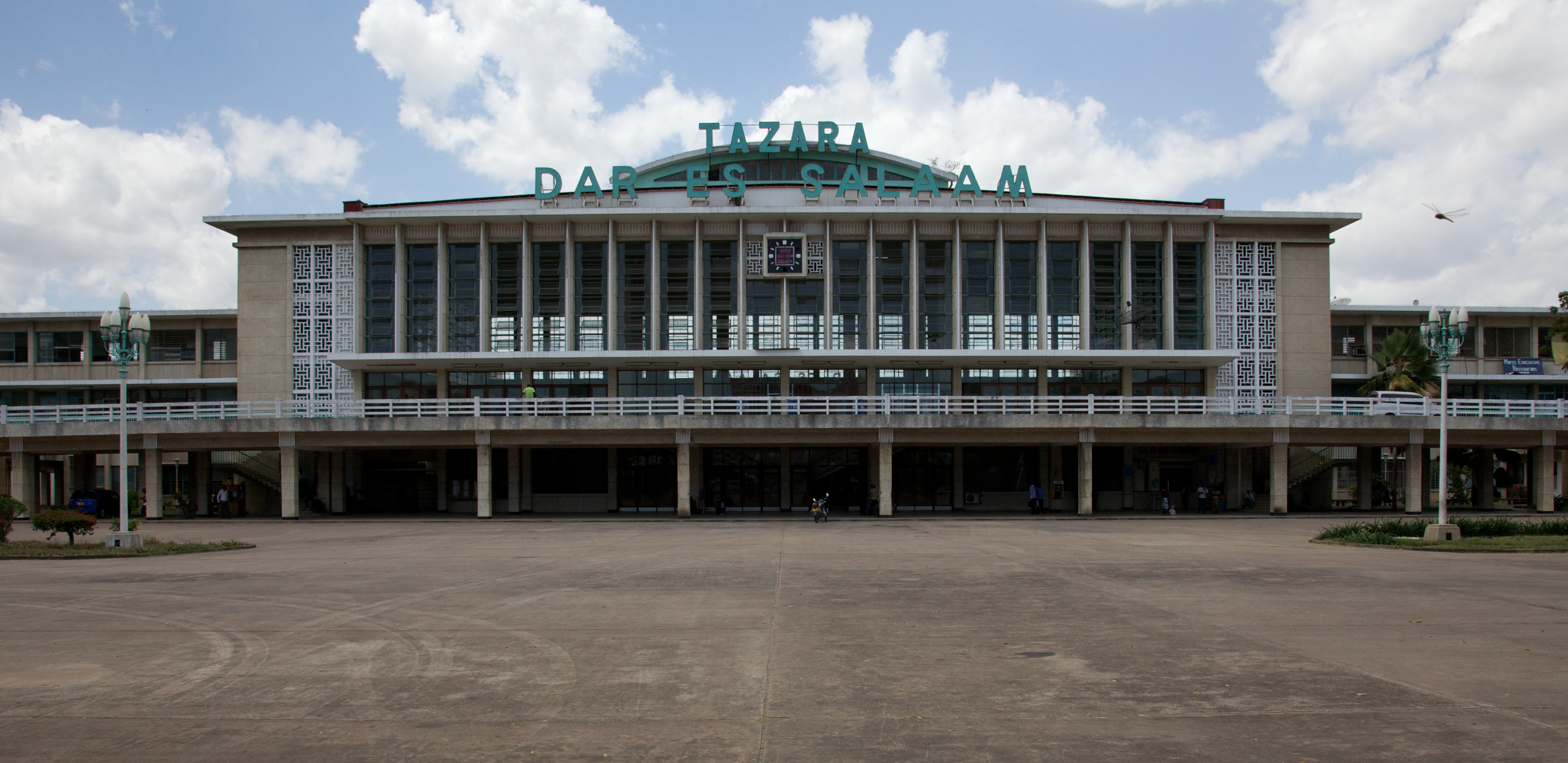
- The TAZARA station.

Overview
- Owner: Tanzanian Government
- Locale: Railway Street, Dar es Salaam, Tanzania
- Transit type: Commuter rail
- Number of lines: 2
- Number of stations: 23
- Daily ridership: 16,000
- Website: www.mwtc.go.tz

Operation
- Began operation: 29 October 2012
- Operators: TAZARA; Tanzania Railways

Technical
- System length: 32 km (20 mi)
- Track gauge: 1,067 mm (3 ft 6 in); 1,000 mm (3 ft 3 3/8 in)
- Electrification: 1,500 V DC overhead catenary (planned)

The Dar es Salaam commuter rail, informally known as Treni ya Mwakyembe ("Train of Mwakyembe"), is an urban and suburban commuter rail network serving the Tanzanian commercial city of Dar es Salaam. It is one of the two initiatives taken by the government to ease travel within the congested city; the other being the Dar es Salaam bus rapid transit system. Services are provided by the Tanzania-Zambia Railway Authority (TAZARA) and the Tanzania Railways Corporation (TRC).

== History ==
=== Background ===
Prior to its launch, the Dala dala was the only major means of intracity public transport.

=== Launch ===
The inaugural journey commenced on 29 October 2012. The public affectionately refer to it as Treni ya Mwakyembe in honour of Harrison Mwakyembe, the Transport Minister at the time.

The Citizen reported in January 2013 that 'Zambia was opposed' to the project utilising the TAZARA track and that it wasn't 'properly consulted'. Zambian officials insisted that the matter ought to have been brought before the board of directors for approval as both the governments are equal shareholders. Minister Mwakyembe refuted these allegations saying all procedures were adhered to. An anonymous TAZARA board member commented that they had failed to convene their quarterly meeting for the past six months.

The Chartered Institute of Logistics and Transport presented an award to Mwakyembe in December 2013 for introducing this service.

The TRC Line launched on 1 August 2016, plying the airport route 3 times in the morning from 6 am and 3 times in the evening from 15.55 hours.

== Routes ==
=== TRC line ===
TRC (1,000 mm (3 ft 3 3/8 in)) operates a 20.0 km (12.4 mi) track from Pugu Station to the city centre via Gongo la Mboto, FFU mombasa, Banana, Karakata (Airport), Vingunguti Mbuzi, SS Bakhresa, Kamata (Kariakoo City BRT station) then finally Central.

=== TAZARA line ===
TAZARA (1,067 mm (3 ft 6 in)) offers two routes on its 20.5 km (12.7 mi) rail network. The first from its station in Dar es Salaam to Mwakanga which lies on the outskirts of the city. It stops at Kwa Fundi Umeme, Kwa Limboa, Lumo Kigilagila, Sigara, Kitunda road, Kipunguni B, Majohe and Magnus. The second service runs from its Dar es Salaam station to Kurasini via Kwa Fundi Umeme, Yombo, Chimwaga, Maputo, Mtoni Relini and Kwa Aziz Ali Relini.

== Operations ==
The service is available during the morning and evening rush hours throughout the week (excluding Sundays and public holidays). TRC runs six trains in each direction for each of its routes.

=== Ticket pricing ===
Tickets on the TRC line are priced TSh 400/- and 600/- for adults on the Dar es Salaam–Ubongo and Dar es Salaam–Pugu routes, respectively. Tickets are priced TSh 100/- for students.

=== Ridership ===
All commuter rail lines carried a combined 4.44 million passengers in 2024. TAZARA service carried 1.37 million passengers, and TRC service carried 3.07 million passengers. Ridership on the TAZARA line declined from a 2022 peak of 1.90 million passengers, whilst TRC line ridership increased from a low of 2.56 million passengers in 2023.

=== Finance ===
As of November 2013, the TRC line has been operating at a loss. It costs TSh 4,000,000 per day to run, whereas revenue from ticket sales stands at TSh 2,000,000. The high operating cost has been attributed to the engines and wagons which aren't cost efficient for short journeys.

=== Future expansion ===
In December 2019, TRC completed a feasibility study for 6 new railway routes within the network. Route A would link the Mikocheni, Mwenge, Ubungo, and Mtoni wards. Route B would link the Central Business District with Pugu and Karakata (Airport). Route C would connect Mwenge with Wazo Hill and Bagamoyo. Route D would circle the city, linking Vikindu Charambe with Kibiha. Route E would stop at several places, starting in Mtoni and ending in Mwenge. Route F links the Central Business District to Kigamboni.

== Incidents ==
- On 26 January 2015 a train on the TAZARA line went astray onto the wrong track, and narrowly avoided colliding with another locomotive engine.
- On 17 October 2023 a passenger train on the TAZARA line collided head-on with a cargo train, injuring 62 people.

== See also ==
- Railway stations in Tanzania
