= Hale, Tanzania =

Coordinates: 05°17′00″S 38°36′00″E

Hale is a town in eastern Tanzania. It belongs to Mnyuzi ward in Korogwe district. It is the location of the major falls of Pangani River and a hydroelectric power station.

Latitude -5.2833 Longitude 38.6000 Altitude (feet) 830 Lat (DMS) 5° 16' 60S Long (DMS) 38° 36' 0E Altitude (meters) 252

== Transport ==
Hale is on the A14 highway Dar es Salaam - Chalinze - Tanga. It is served by a junction station on a cross-country line of the national railway system.

== See also ==
- Railway stations in Tanzania
