= TAZARA Memorial Park =

TAZARA Memorial Park is located in Chongwe, Lusaka Province, Zambia, and was built to commemorate the construction of the TAZARA Railway and honor the workers who lost their lives during the project. The park was officially opened on August 10, 2022.

== Construction ==
In the 1960s and 1970s, China undertook the construction of a railway connecting Tanzania and Zambia. A total of 50,000 Chinese workers participated in this project, with up to 16,000 workers on site during its peak.. Unfortunately, several Chinese workers lost their lives due to various causes, with some being buried in Tanzania and others in Zambia. On May 14, 2019, the groundbreaking ceremony for the memorial park was held in Zambia. The entire project was constructed by CCECC, and upon completion, all 36 Chinese martyrs buried in Zambia were relocated to the memorial park. The park was officially completed and inaugurated on August 10, 2022, in a ceremony attended by Zambian President Hakainde Hichilema. Since its completion, the site has hosted several commemorative events organized by Chinese embassy and consulate staff along with local government representatives.

== Structure ==
The TAZARA Memorial Park spans 20,000 square meters and features an external outline resembling a Chinese knot, symbolizing the strong ties between China and Zambia. The park is divided into several sections, including the Gate of Friendship, the Memorial Square, the Martyrs' Cemetery, and the TAZARA Memorial Museum.

== See also ==
- Cemetery of Chinese Experts in Tanzania
