= Mzenga =

Coordinates: 06°56′S 38°43′E

Mzenga is a small town located in Kisarawe District in the Pwani Region of Tanzania.

== Climate ==
Mzenga's climate is a wet tropical savannah.

== Transport ==
It is served by a station on the TAZARA Railway.

== See also ==
- Railway stations in Tanzania
