= Sadani, Tanga, Tanzania =

Coordinates: 06°03′00″S 38°47′00″E

Sadani is one of two places in Tanzania with this name. This is the one in Tanga Region, near the coast.

== History ==
In the East African campaign of World War I the British Royal Navy bombarded Sadani, first with the monitor Mersey on 26 July 1916 and then with the battleship HMS Vengeance on 3 August. This led the German East African authorities in Sadani to surrender to British land and naval forces.

== Transport ==
Both namesakes are served by nearby stations on the national railway network.

== See also ==
- Railway stations in Tanzania
