= Ikungu =

Tanzanian town

Coordinates: 05°30′00″S 33°51′0″E

Ikungu is a town in central Tanzania.

== Transport ==
It is served by a station on the Central Railway of Tanzania.

== See also ==
- Railway stations in Tanzania
