= Kidatu =

Kidatu, Tanzania
- Location in Tanzania
- Coordinates: 07°42′00″S 36°57′00″E
- Country: Tanzania
- Region: Morogoro Region
- District: Kilombero District
- Elevation: 965 ft (294 m)
- Time zone: UTC+3 (East Africa Time)
- Climate: Aw

Kidatu is a town in central Tanzania, located in Kilombero District, Morogoro Region. The local population is about 3,300. The primary economic activity is the large Illovo sugar cane plantation and factory which produces 130,000 tonnes (130,000 long tons; 140,000 short tons) of sugar per year.

== Geography ==
It lies on plains to the south of mountains to the north.

== Transport ==
Kidatu is the terminus of a 107 km-long (66 mi) 1,000 mm (3 ft 3 3/8 in) narrow gauge branch line from Kilosa off the Tanzania Railways Corporation Central line, built between 1958 and 1963. In the 1970s, the newer 1,067 mm (3 ft 6 in) TAZARA railway was built through.

Hence there is a break of gauge at Kidatu.

It is about 300 km (190 mi) from Dar es Salaam, either via the north or TAZARA.

=== Transshipment hub ===
Since 1998, a transshipment station has been provided to overcome the break-of-gauge at this location. This hub connects the large 3 ft 6 in (1,067 mm) zone of southern Africa and bypasses congestion at Dar es Salaam.

Under a deal with Tanzania, metre gauge trains that connect with 3 ft 6 in (1,067 mm) trains at Kidatu are operated by the Trans Africa Railway Corporation.

Approximately 160,000 t (160,000 long tons; 180,000 short tons) of traffic passes through the hub each year.

== Industry ==
Kidatu has a sugar mill.

== See also ==
- Kidatu Dam
- Transport in Tanzania
- East African Railway Master Plan
- Cape-Cairo railway
- Railway stations in Tanzania
