= Liganga =

Coordinates: 09°52′00″S 34°51′00″E

Liganga is a site in Njombe Region, Tanzania where iron ore is mined in Liganga mine. It is also rich in both vanadium and titanium.

The deposits are near Lake Malawi in the south of the country.

== See also ==
- Railway stations in Tanzania - proposed
- Liganga on Google Maps
