= Pride of Africa (train) =

Luxury train in southern Africa

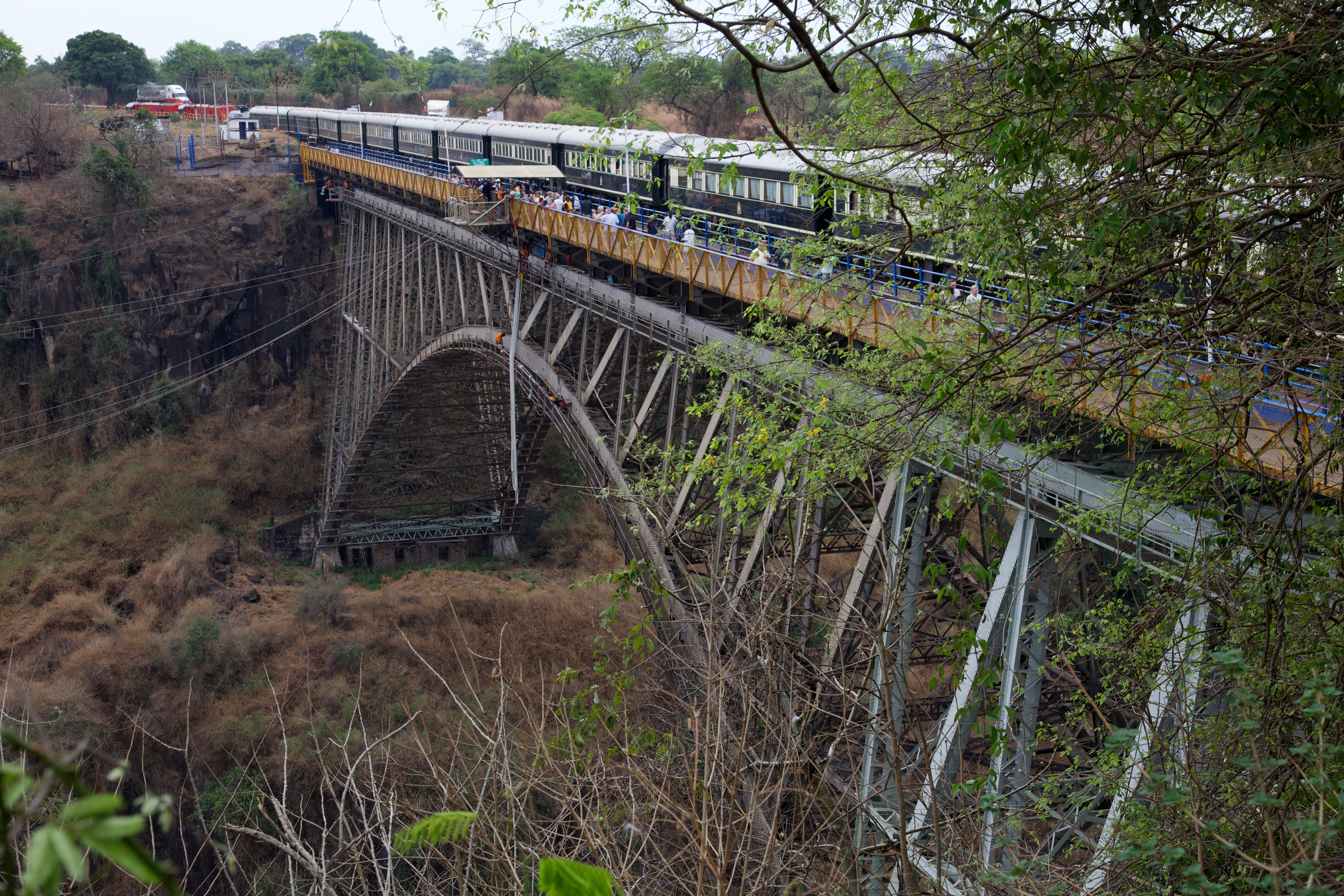
Pride of Africa parked on the Victoria Falls Bridge (2012)

The Pride of Africa is a luxury train operated by Rovos Rail. The train travels through South Africa, Zimbabwe, Zambia, and Tanzania. It is billed as the "World's Most Luxurious Train".

== Locations ==
The following is a list of the locations on the traditional route followed by the Pride of Africa. However, as of 2010, there are variations to this route, such as a branch through Botswana.

- South Africa
  - Cape Town
  - Matjiesfontein
  - Kimberley
  - Pretoria
  - Hoedspruit
  - Beit Bridge
- Zimbabwe
  - Victoria Falls
- Zambia
  - Livingstone
  - Lusaka
  - Kanona
  - Kundalila Falls
  - Mpika
  - Kasama
  - Nkonde
- Tanzania
  - Tunduma
  - Makambako
  - Mlimba
  - Kiduna
  - Mzenga
  - Dar es Salaam
