= Kitonga =

- Town
- Location within Tanzania
- Coordinates: 6°34′S 38°45′E
- Country: Tanzania
- Region: Pwani
- Elevation: 65 m (213 ft)

Kitonga is a town in eastern Tanzania near the coast.

== Transport ==
It is served by a station on a cross-country line of the national railway network.

== See also ==
- Railway stations in Tanzania
