= TAZARA Railway =

Railway in Tanzania and Zambia

Tanzania–Zambia Railway

Overview
- Status: Minimally operational
- Termini: Dar es Salaam, (Tanzania); Kapiri Mposhi, (Zambia)
- Website: www.tazarasite.com

Service
- Type: Heavy rail
- Operator: Tanzania–Zambia Railway Authority

History
- Opened: 1975

Technical
- Line length: 1,860 km (1,156 mi)
- Track gauge: 1,067 mm (3 ft 6 in)

Tanzania railway network 1000mm gauge, 1067mm gauge (TAZARA)

The TAZARA Railway, also called the Uhuru Railway or the Tanzam Railway, is a railway in East Africa linking the port of Dar es Salaam in east Tanzania with the town of Kapiri Mposhi in Zambia's Central Province. The single-track railway is 1,860 km (1,160 mi) long and is operated by the Tanzania-Zambia Railway Authority (TAZARA).

The governments of Tanzania, Zambia, and China built the railway to eliminate landlocked Zambia's economic dependence on Rhodesia and South Africa, both of which were ruled by white-minority governments. The railway provided the only route for bulk trade from Zambia's Copperbelt to reach the sea without having to transit white-ruled territories. The spirit of Pan-African socialism among the leaders of Tanzania and Zambia and the symbolism of China's support for newly independent African countries gave rise to Tazara's designation as the "Great Uhuru Railway", Uhuru being the Swahili word for freedom.

The project was built from 1970 to 1975 as a turnkey project financed and supported by China. At its completion, the Tazara was the longest railway in sub-Saharan Africa. Tazara was also the largest single foreign-aid project undertaken by China at the time, at a construction cost of US $406 million (the equivalent of US $3.37 billion today). The construction phase was a significant milestone in South-South cooperation, involving a unique labor model where approximately 13,000 Chinese technicians worked alongside 38,000 African laborers. This interaction helped support a transfer of technical skills and led to the growth in Tanzania and Zambia.

Tazara has faced operational difficulties from the start and was kept running by continued assistance from China, several European countries, and the United States. Freight traffic peaked at 1.2 million tons in 1986, but began to decline in the 1990s as the end of apartheid in South Africa and the independence of Namibia opened alternative transport routes for Zambian copper. Freight traffic bottomed out at 88,000 metric tons in Fiscal Year (FY) 2014/2015, less than 2% of the railway's design capacity of 5 million tonnes per year.

In February 2024, the China Civil Engineering Construction Corporation (CCECC) submitted a proposal for the upgrading of the Tazara to standard gauge, as well as for a concession to operate the line. A corresponding Memorandum of Understanding was signed at the 9th Forum on China-Africa Cooperation (FOCAC) in Beijing in September 2024. The refurbishment is to commence as a public private partnership.

On 21 March 2025, the Citizen published that Tanzania is receiving an investment of 1.4 billion US dollars from the CCECC for the rehabilitation of the Tazara railway. In early 2026, the project moved into the active implementation phase which included resuming the passenger services on February 10. The current strategy is focusing on a move toward a Public-Private Partnership model for long-term operational sustainability. One billion will be invested in the repair of the tracks, safety and efficiency, and a further 400 million in the purchase of new locomotives and wagons.

== Route ==
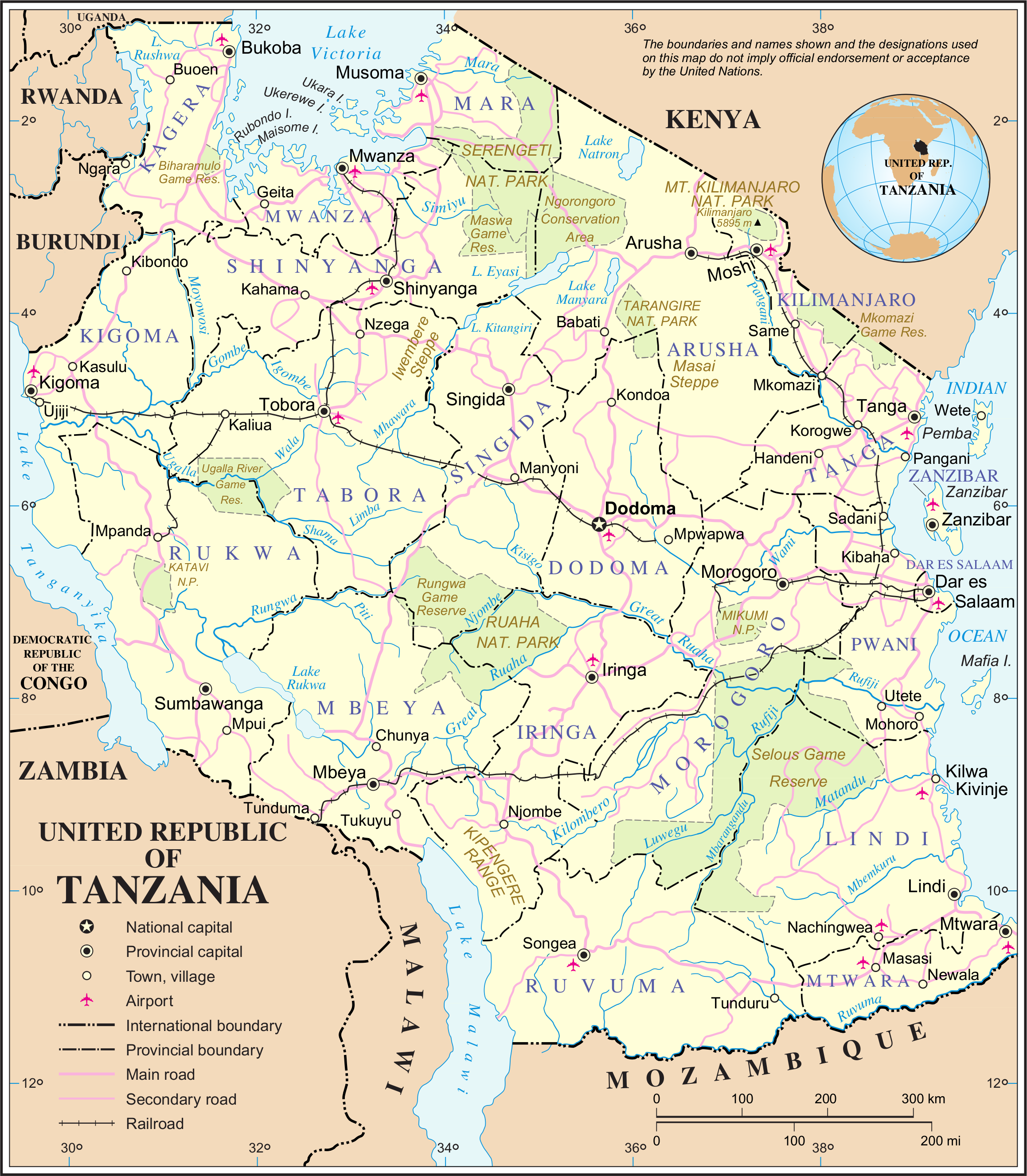
Map showing the course of the TAZARA in relation to Tanzania's geography, national parks and game reserves

Running some 1,860 km (1,160 mi) from Tanzania's largest city, Dar es Salaam, on the coast of the Indian Ocean to Kapiri Mposhi, near the Copperbelt of central Zambia, the Tazara is sometimes regarded as the greatest engineering effort of its kind since World War II. The railway crosses Tanzania in a southwest direction, leaving the coastal strip and then entering largely uninhabited areas of the Nyerere National Park. As of 2026 revitalization project this corridor is being prioritized for drainage upgrades to battle the seasonal flooding. The line crosses the Tanzam Highway at Makambako and runs parallel to the highway toward Mbeya and the Zambian border, before entering Zambia, and linking with Zambia Railways at Kapiri Mposhi.

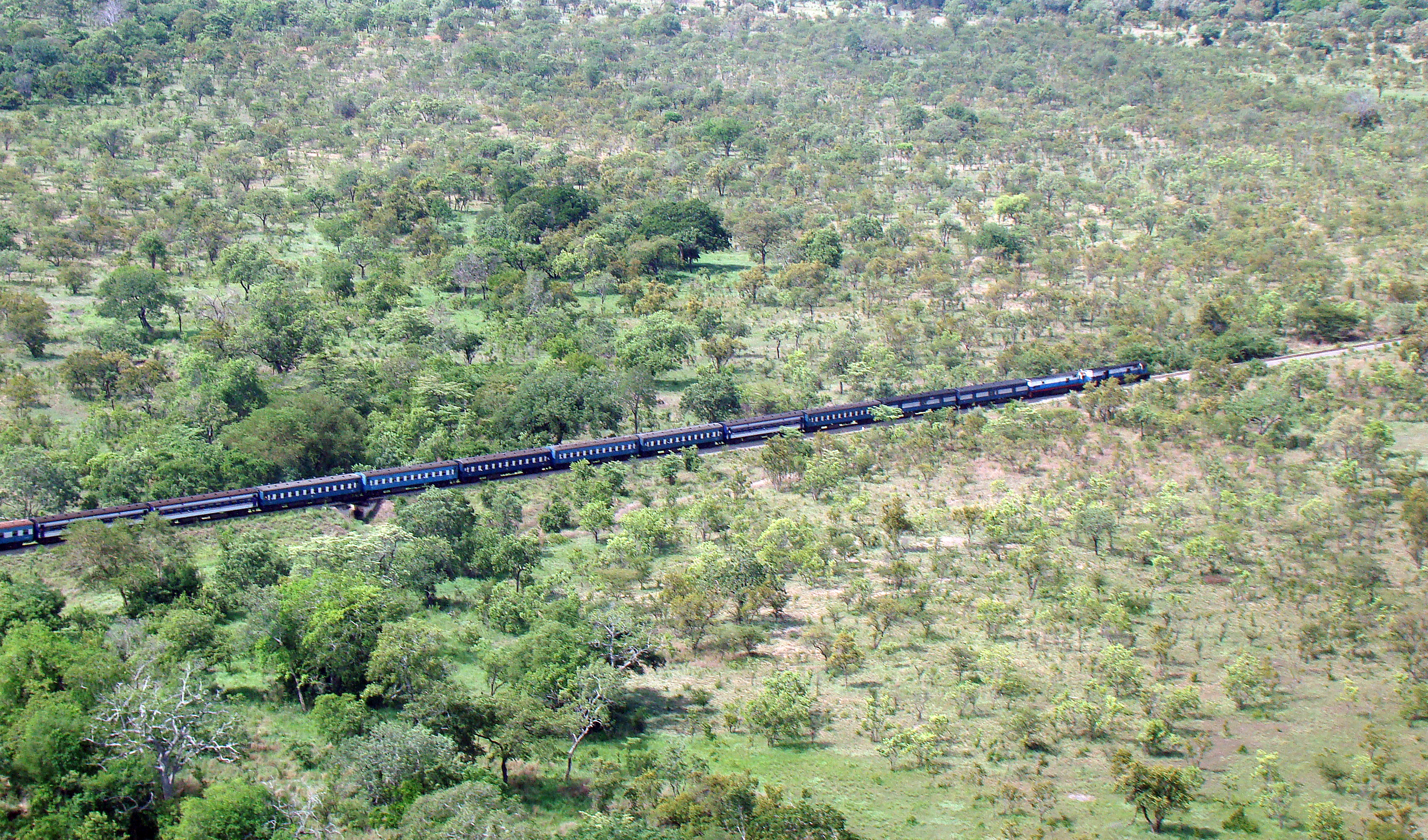
The Tazara locomotive passing through the Nyerere National Park

From sea level, the railway climbs to 550 metres (1,800 feet) at Mlimba. In the 158 km (98 mi) stretch between Mlimba and Makambako, the line traverses the Udzungwa Mountains through a complex system of 46 bridges and 18 tunnels.The track then reaches its highest point of 1,789.43 m (5,870 ft 10 in) at Uyole in Mbeya before descending to 1,660 m (5,450 ft) at Mwenzo, the highest point in Zambia, and settling to 1,274.63 m (4,181 ft 10 in) at Kapiri Mposhi.

=== The Tanzanian interior ===
Upon leaving the coast, Tazara runs west, through the Pwani Region, then dips south of Mikumi National Park and enters the wilderness in the northern part of the Nyerere National Park in the Morogoro Region. The Selous is one of the largest faunal reserves in the world and passengers can often see wildlife such as giraffe, elephant, zebra, antelope and warthog, which have become accustomed to the rumbling of the trains. The railway crosses the Great Ruaha River for the first time in the Selous.

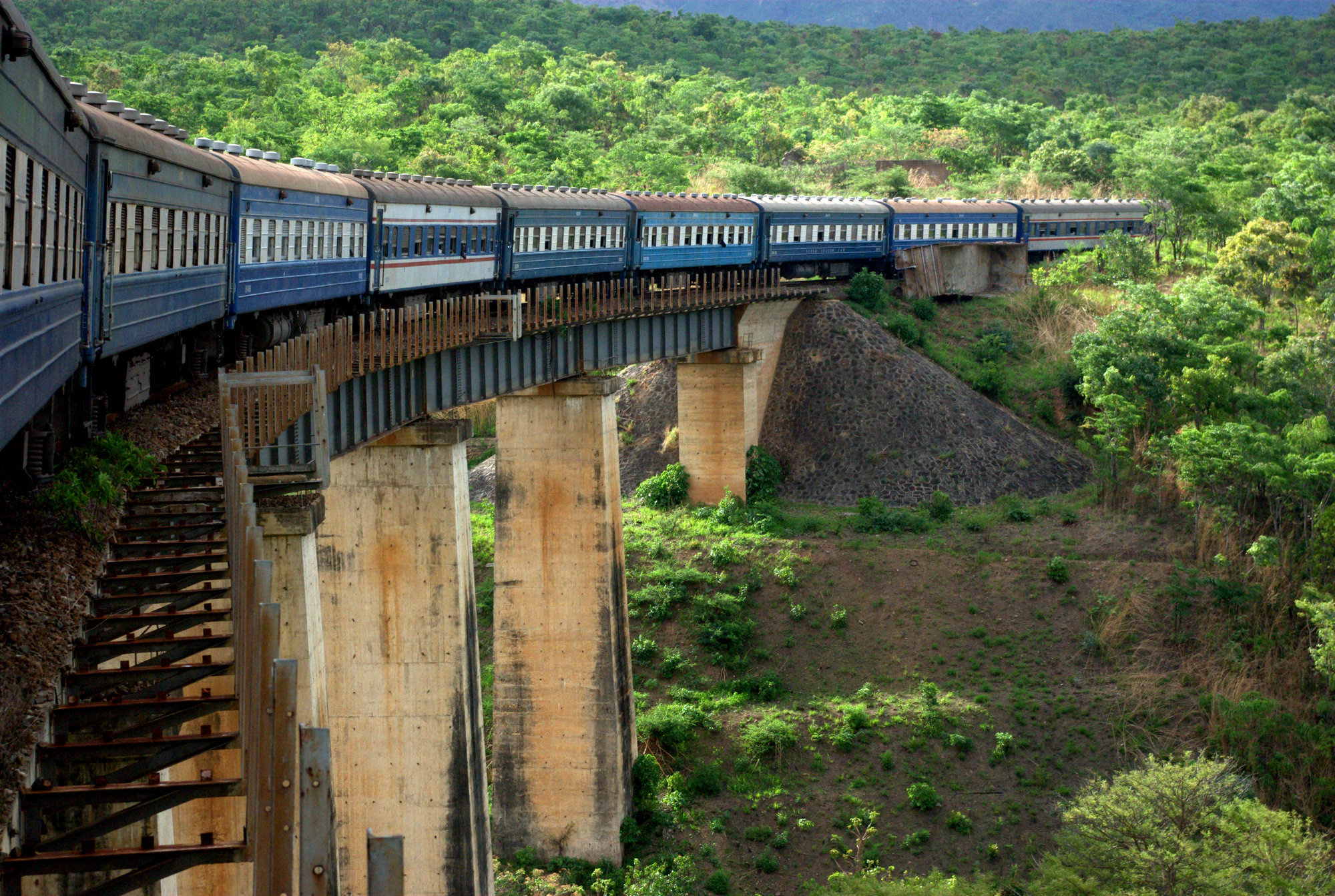
The bridge crossing on the Tazara Railway in Zambia in 2009

Further south, the railway cuts through the fertile Kilombero Valley, and skirts the great Kibasira Swamp. The next section, between Mlimba (the Kingdom of Elephants) and Makambako (the Place of Bulls) was to be 158 km (98 mi) long, and presented the builders of the railway with the greatest challenge. To lay track across rugged mountains, precipitous valleys and deep swamps, it was necessary to construct 46 bridges, 18 tunnels, and 36 culverts. Because of the heavy rainfall in this area, intricate drainage works had to be integrated with every feature. The most spectacular feature is the bridge across the Mpanga River, which stands on three 50 m (164 ft) tall pillars.

At Kidatu, a metre gauge branch railway connects to the Central Line at Kilosa. The TAZARA then climbs into the Southern Highlands of the Iringa Region and levels out onto a rolling plateau. Here, in the coffee and tea country of the Njombe Region, the weather becomes noticeably cooler, the air sharper. On the approach to Makambako, the Udzungwa Mountains National Park rise 2,137 m (7,011 ft) to the north, while the Kipengere Range roll ahead to the south. Makambako is one of the meeting points of the railway and the Tanzania-Zambia Highway.

From Makambako the railway and the highway run a parallel course towards Mbeya running past the Kipengere Range that towers to the south. Here in the Mbeya Region, the Tazara crosses several upstream tributaries of the Great Ruaha, which are lined with belts of forest and grasslands.

After the Kipengere Mountains, the Uporoto Range takes over with the Usangu Flats stretching to the north. From Mbeya town, both the railway and the highway heads northwest to Tunduma where they cross the border into Zambia.

=== Zambia ===
The Tazara enters northeastern Zambia in the Nakonde District, in the Muchinga Province, and heads southwest to Kasama. It then turns due south and crosses the Chambeshi River en route to Mpika. After entering the Central Province, the railway again turns to the southwest, running along the northern foothills of the Muchinga Mountains, past Serenje and Mkushi to Kapiri Mposhi, located due north of the Zambian capital, Lusaka. Chinese companies are upgrading the 1,860km rail line to Dar es Salaam in Tanzania, which will link Zambia’s copper region to a port on the Indian ocean.

== Passenger service ==
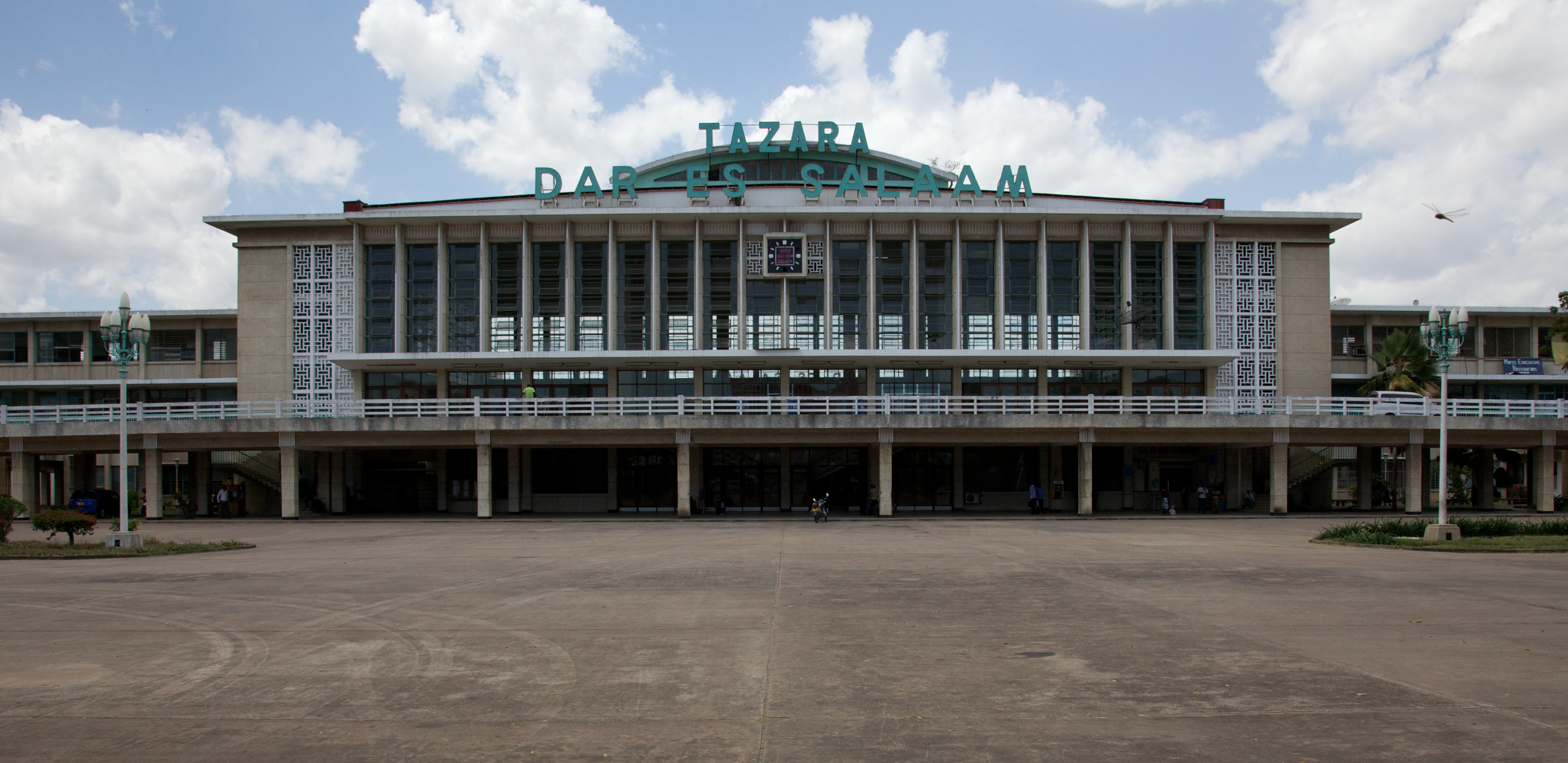
The Tazara Railway Station in Dar es Salaam

TAZARA announced the resumption of passenger servies between Dar es Salaam and Kapiri Mposhi on 10 February 2026, one passenger train per week in each direction. Departures are on Fridays from Dar es Salaam and on Tuesdays from Kapiri Mposhi. from in each direction. Trains on the TAZARA are slower than overland bus service but cheaper and safer. The TAZARA trains have attracted foreign tourists wishing to see the landscape and wildlife along route.

Rovos Rail of South Africa operates the Pride of Africa, a luxury train, that runs periodic tours from Cape Town to Dar es Salaam via the TAZARA.

The TAZARA tracks are also used for passenger commuter rail service between Dar es Salaam and its suburbs. The Dar es Salaam commuter rail was launched in 2012 to relieve traffic congestion. The TAZARA offers two routes on its 20.5 km rail network.

== Rail gauge and standards ==
The TAZARA has a track gauge of 3 ft 6 in (1,067 mm), also known as the Cape gauge, which is widely used throughout southern Africa. TAZARA connects to the Cape-gauge Zambia Railways at Kapiri Mposhi. The remainder of Tanzania’s railways have 1,000 mm (3 ft 3 3/8 in) metre gauge tracks. A transshipment station with a break of gauge station was built in Kidatu in 1998.

Except for the rail gauge, TAZARA generally reflects Chinese railway standards of the 1970s. The technical characteristics of the line were:

1. Couplers: Janney (AAR)
2. Brakes: Air/vacuum
3. Axle loading: 20 metric tons
4. Sleepers: Concrete on main line, Wood at turnouts and on bridges
5. Rail: High-manganese steel, 45 kg/m (90 lb/yard), mostly jointed
6. Signals: Semaphore
7. Design speed: 110 km/h (70 mph)
8. Design capacity: 5 million metric tons per year
9. Loading gauge: Limited by 22 tunnels in the Udzungwa Mountains

== Equipment ==
=== Locomotives ===
At the moment the railway operates three types of locomotives as listed below:

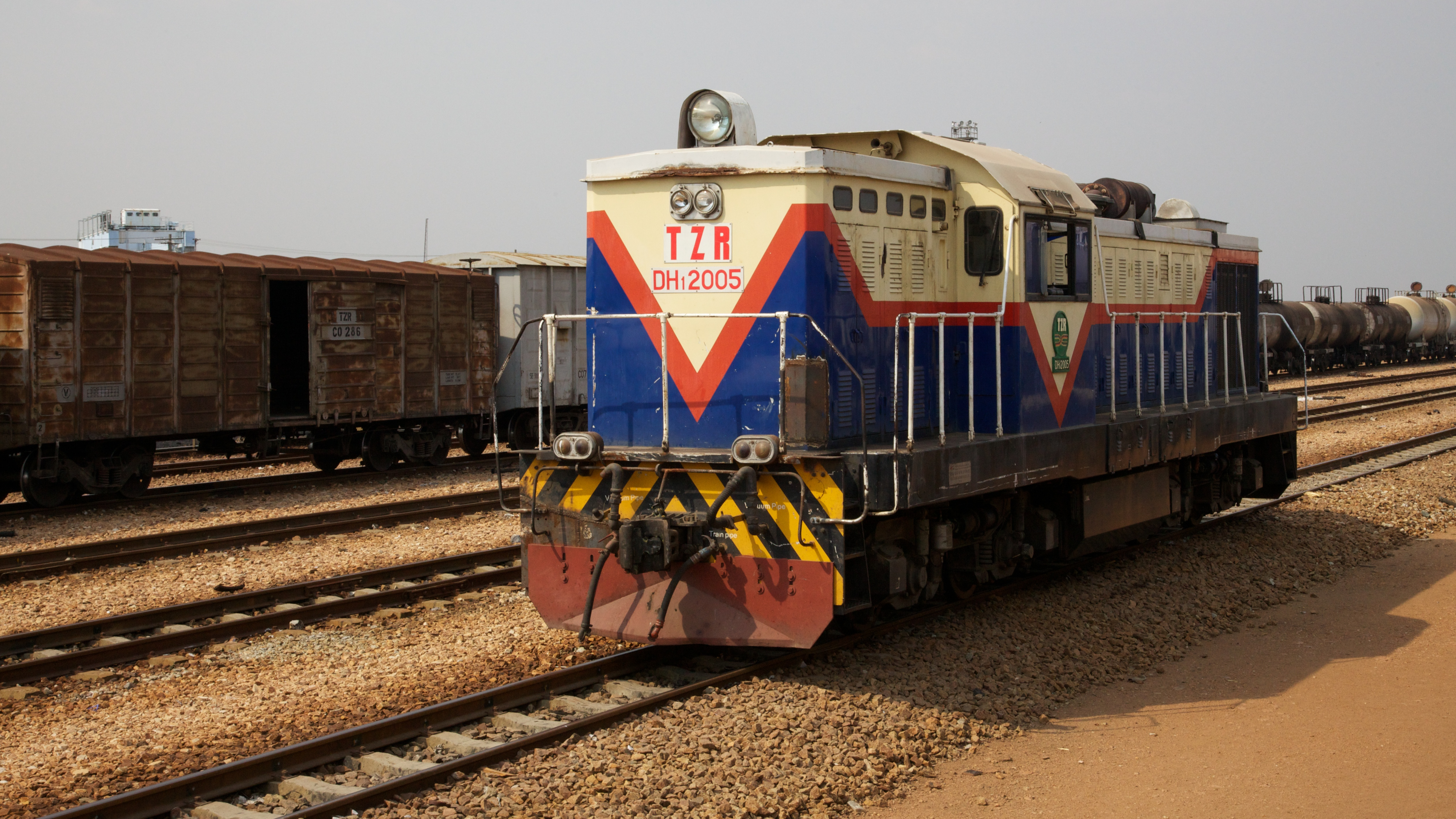
Locomotive on the TAZARA at the Kapiri Mposhi Station in 2012

Type	Quantity	Manufacturer	Notes	Sources
SDD20	10	CSR Qishuyan		
U30C	10	Krupp	Variant of GE U26C, not to be confused with the identically named GE U30C.	
CK6		CSR Chengdu	Shunting locomotive	

== History ==
=== Origins of the project ===
In the late 19th century, Cecil Rhodes envisioned a railway from British Rhodesia to Tanganyika (then German East Africa) to carry copper ore. After World War I, Tanganyika was handed over to the United Kingdom for administration as a League of Nations Mandate, and British colonial authorities again explored the idea. Still, from the outset, the Western powers refused to construct the Tanzam railway because it would have been unprofitable for Western investors.

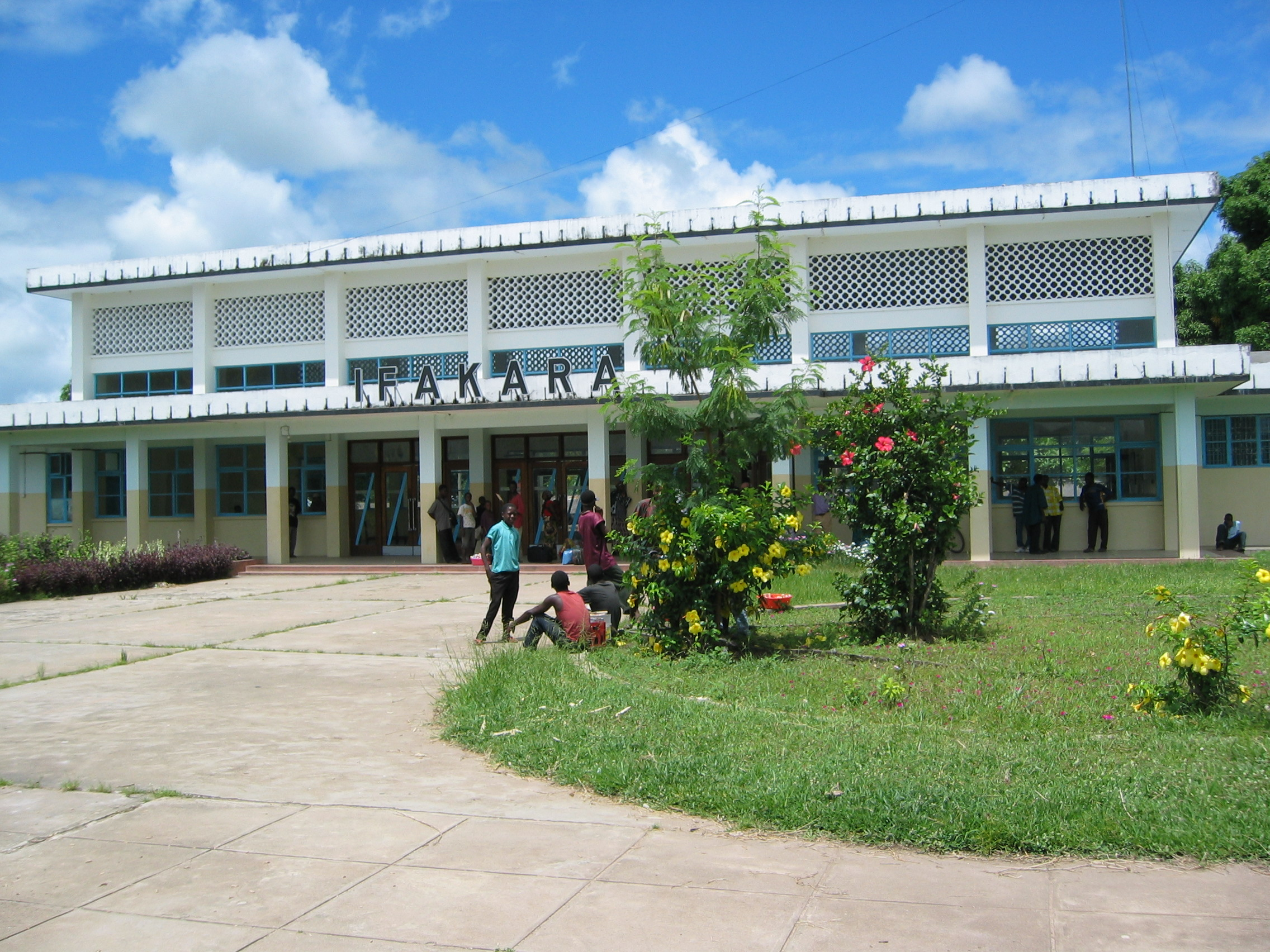
TAZARA train station in Ifakara

Following World War II, interest in railway construction revived. A map from April 1949 in Railway Gazette showed a proposed line from Dar es Salaam to Kapiri Mposhi, not far from the route that would eventually be taken by the Chinese railway. A report in 1952 by Sir Alexander Gibb & Partners concluded that the Northern Rhodesia-Tanganyika railway was not economically justified, due to the low level of agricultural development and the fact that existing railways through Mozambique and Angola were adequate for carrying copper exports. A World Bank report in 1964 projected that only 87,000 tons of cargo would be carried between Zambia and Tanzania by the year 2000, not enough to support a railway, and recommended that a road be built instead.

In 1961, Tanganyika became independent under the leadership of Julius Nyerere, and in 1964 the country joined with Zanzibar to form the United Republic of Tanzania. Also in 1964, Northern Rhodesia was granted independence as Zambia, under the leadership of Kenneth Kaunda. Both Nyerere and Kaunda were charismatic socialist African leaders who supported the self-determination of their African neighbors. A railway connecting their two countries would help to develop the agricultural regions of southwestern Tanzania and northeastern Zambia.

=== Attempts to secure funding ===
Nyerere and Kaunda pursued different avenues for the construction of a rail route. Funding was sought from France, which deemed the project not viable and refused.

When Nyerere visited Beijing in February 1965, he was hesitant to raise the issue of the railway out of concern that China was also a poor country. President Liu Shaoqi offered to assist Tanzania and Zambia in building a railway between the two countries. Chairman Mao Zedong told Nyerere, "You have difficulties as do we, but our difficulties are different. To help you build the railway, we are willing to forsake building railways for ourselves." Chinese leaders assured Nyerere that Tanzania and Zambia would have full ownership of the completed railway, along with transferred technology and equipment. Nyerere did not immediately accept the Chinese offer but sought to use it to induce Western backing for the railway, but none was forthcoming. He did, however, accept a team of Chinese surveyors, who produced a short report in October 1966.

Kaunda was wary of Communist involvement and wanted to maintain friendly ties with Britain. He turned down an offer from the Chinese Embassy in Lusaka to build the railway. In addition, Zambia and Rhodesia were joint owners of the Zambian Railway, and the joint ownership agreement would penalize Zambia for diverting traffic to other railways. A Canadian-British aerial survey was commissioned and conducted by chief engineer John Leslie Charles, concluding in a July 1966 report that the line was "feasible and economic" based on a predicted 2.5 million tons of traffic, with an estimated construction cost of £126 million ($353 million). Western funding was not, however, forthcoming, as Britain, Japan, West Germany, World Bank, the United States and United Nations all declined to fund the project. The Soviet Union was also uninterested.

=== Chinese support ===
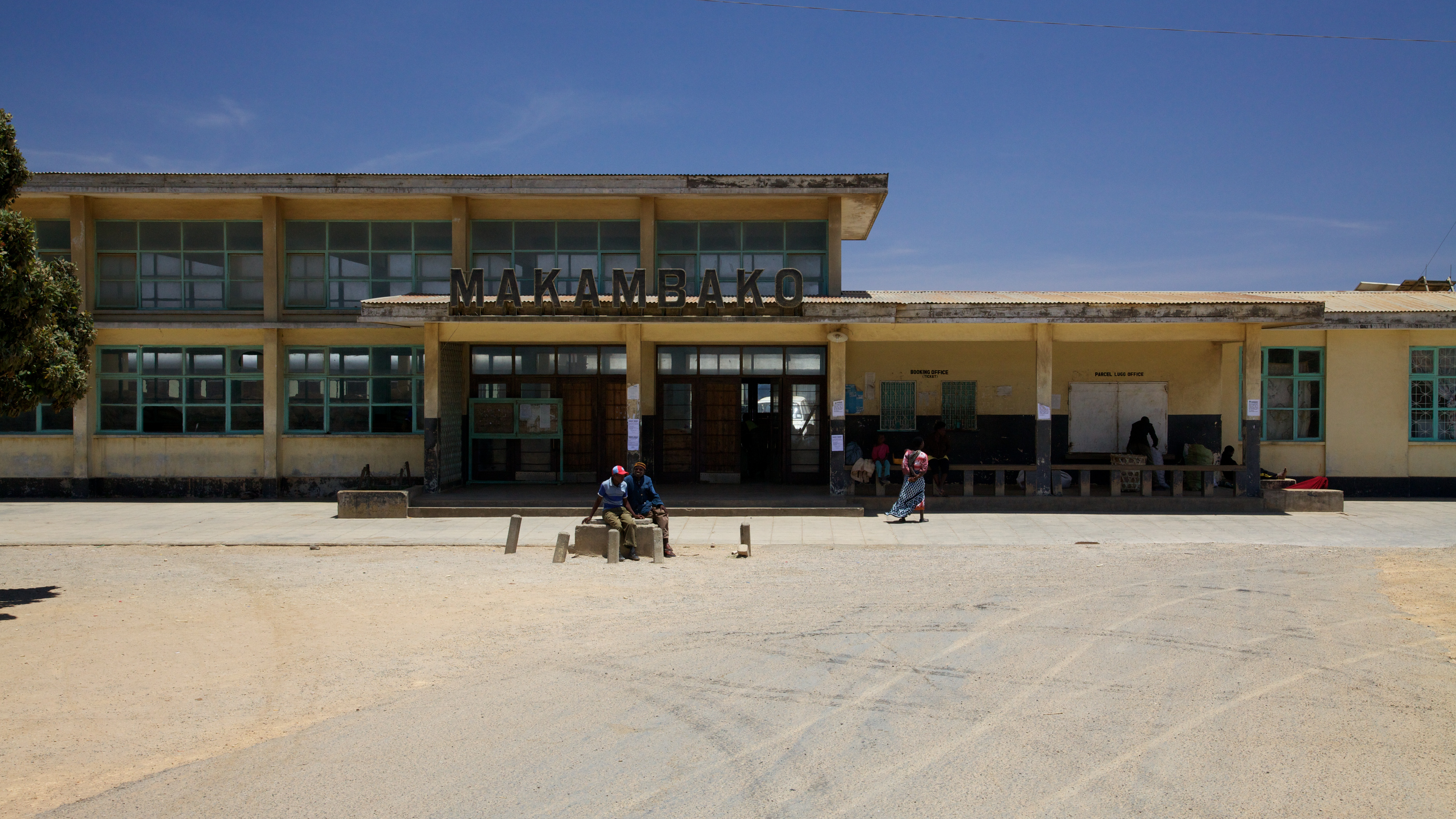
The TAZARA station at Makambako

At the time, China was actively seeking diplomatic support in the Third World against the United States and Soviet Union. Trade Minister Abdulrahman Babu and other ministers from Zanzibar were instrumental in lobbying Chinese leaders for support and then persuading Nyerere to accept the assistance. British prime minister Harold Wilson, after seeing Tanzania's pro-China attitude at the 1965 Commonwealth Prime Ministers' Conference, claimed that many of Nyerere's ministers were "directly in the Chinese pay." Canadian prime minister Lester Pearson also questioned whether Nyerere should get so close to the Chinese.

Nyerere later complained that Western nations opposed the Chinese plans for the railway, but did not offer him any alternative.

"... all the money in this world is either Red or Blue. I do not have my own Green money, so where can I get some from? I am not taking a cold war position. All I want is money to build it."

— Julius Nyerere, PRO, DO183/730, from Dar es Salaam to CRO, No. 1089, 3 July 1965

In November 1965, Southern Rhodesia's white-led colonial government issued its Unilateral Declaration of Independence from Britain, threatening Zambia's access to the sea. In the first months after UDI, supplies had to be airlifted to Zambia or transported 1,600 km (1,000 mi) by road. Nyerere warned Humphry John Berkeley, a British politician who served as the economic consultant for the Canadian-British survey team, that "The West must hurry, because the Chinese are going ahead." Yet, when Berkeley met with Harold Wilson, the British prime minister assured him that "The Chinese have not got the money to build the railway."

Finally, Kaunda dropped his objections and accepted the Chinese offer while visiting China in January 1967. On 6 September 1967, an agreement was signed in Beijing by the three nations. China committed itself to building a railway between Tanzania and Zambia, supplying an interest-free loan of RMB988 million (approx. US$406 million) to be repaid between 1973 and 2013. This was part of China’s larger policy of giving unilateral aid to developing nations during the 1960s and 1970s, which strengthened after Premier Zhou Enlai visited Africa in 1964 and declared the continent "ripe for revolution."

The West reacted to Chinese backing for the project with both derision and alarm. Critics questioned the construction quality and competence of the Chinese, calling the TAZARA the "bamboo railway". The West also voiced concerns about a potential loss of Tanzanian sovereignty, which were worsened when both Tanzania and Zambia signed trade agreements favorable to Beijing. One caveat of the agreement allowed Beijing to flood Tanzanian and Zambian markets with surplus goods, often referred to as “make-weight” goods. These were low-value industrial products added mainly to fill cargo space, and they frequently went unsold, undercutting local businesses despite the railway’s broader economic goals. The Wall Street Journal stated in 1967, "the prospects of hundreds and perhaps thousands of Red Guards descending upon an already troubled Africa is a chilling one for the West." The United States funded the Tanzam Highway, which was built from 1968 to 1973, to compete with the railway. As the projects proceeded in parallel, Chinese and American workers clashed at the Great Ruaha River bridge in 1970.

=== Construction ===
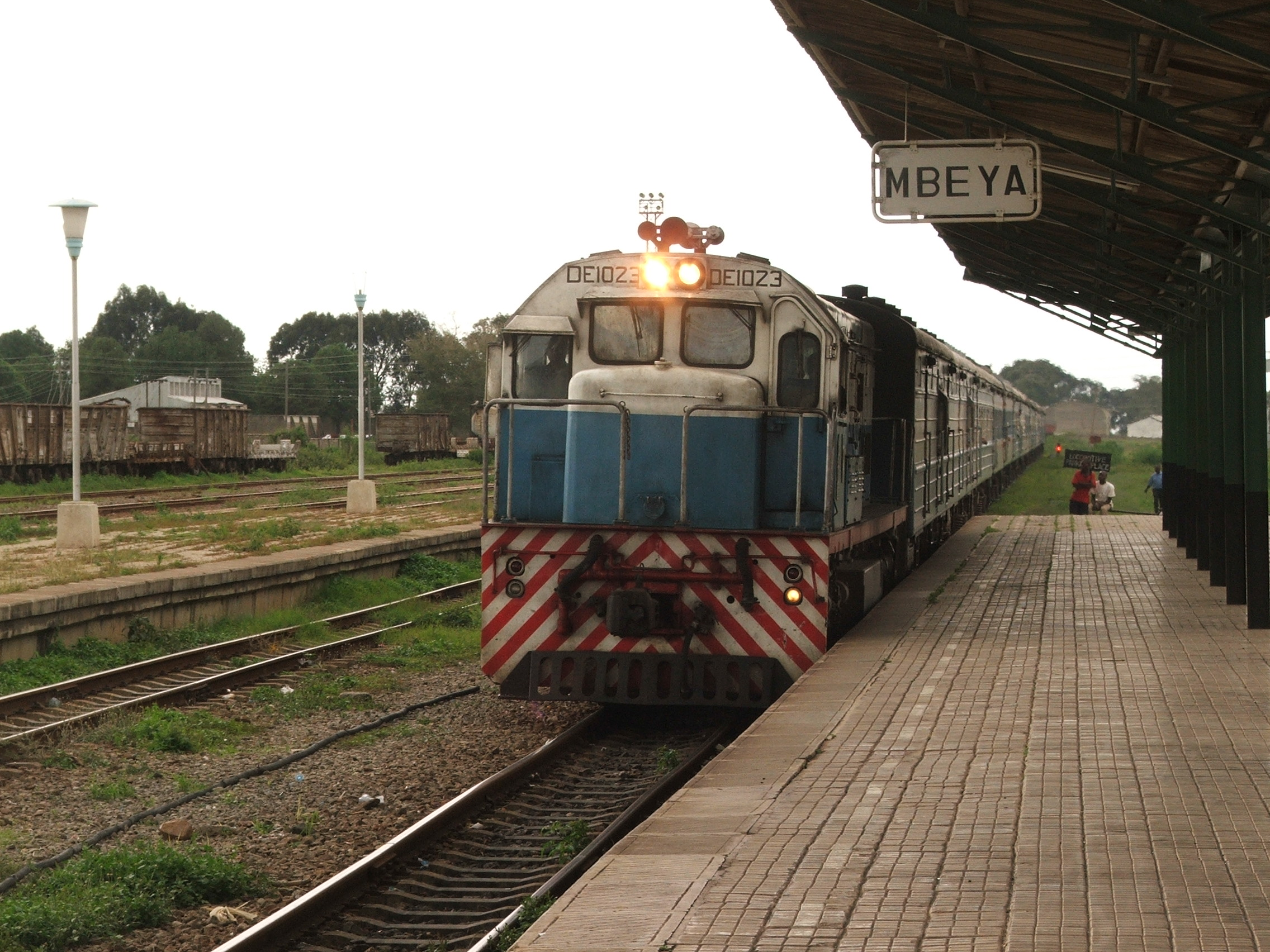
Mbeya station on the Tazara Railway

Before the railway construction began, 12 Chinese surveyors traveled for nine months on foot from Dar es Salaam to Mbeya in the Southern Highlands to choose and align the railway's path. Chinese workers had already begun arriving in 1969, and construction began in July 1970. A formal inauguration ceremony was held on 26 October 1970, where the band played Sailing the Seas Depends on the Helmsman and marchers held signs saying, "The Uhuru line will fight Imperialism".

Chinese assistance was provided in large part by the Railway Engineering Corps of the People’s Liberation Army (predecessor of China Railway Construction Corporation) and the foreign aid department of the Ministry of Railways (predecessor of China Civil Engineering Construction Corporation). Chinese personnel sent to Africa were selected for political dependability, moral probity, technical expertise and personal fitness, and underwent as much as two months of training. Chinese assistance followed the country's socialist ethos, a labor-intensive model instead of the Western capital-intensive model.

In total, China sent about 50,000 personnel to work on the railway from 1965 to 1976, including 30,000 to 40,000 workers. An estimated 60,000 Africans participated in the railway's construction. At the height of construction in 1972, there were 13,500 Chinese and 38,000 African workers on the project. Chinese engineers lived and worked according to the same standards as their African counterparts. Construction camps were set up for each 64-kilometre (40 mi) section of track, being relocated as the work progressed. Papaya and banana trees were grown to provide shade and food, and workers tended vegetable gardens in the camps on off-hours.

The work involved moving 330,000 tons of rail and 89 million cubic meters of earth and rock, and the construction of 93 stations, 320 bridges, 22 tunnels and 2,225 culverts. Virtually all building materials, equipment and significant amounts of food and medical supplies were shipped from China. According to Du Jian, a Chinese interpreter, China "shipped out more than 1.5 million tonnes of materials, including steel rail, cement, and dynamite, and daily necessities, even though it suffered itself a dire shortage of all commodities." Braving rain, sun and wind, the workers laid the track through some of Africa's wildest and most rugged landscapes. One Chinese worker recalled that his team was trapped in the wilderness for a week after floods and landslides washed away the only connecting road. "We lived in fear of lions and hyenas." Another interviewee stated that conditions were often so bad that "[s]ometimes we had to drink the water that we found in the elephants' footprints." Medical care was so lacking that one Chinese worker died due to an untreated bee sting. Over 160 workers, including 64 Chinese nationals, died in construction accidents. However, construction accidents were not the only cause of death. Food for Chinese workers was sent from China, and shipping delays often meant that the food, typically nothing more than dehydrated vegetables and other basic goods like wheat flour, was moldy when it arrived, causing working conditions to become even more dire. Some of the victims were buried in a cemetery in Tanzania.

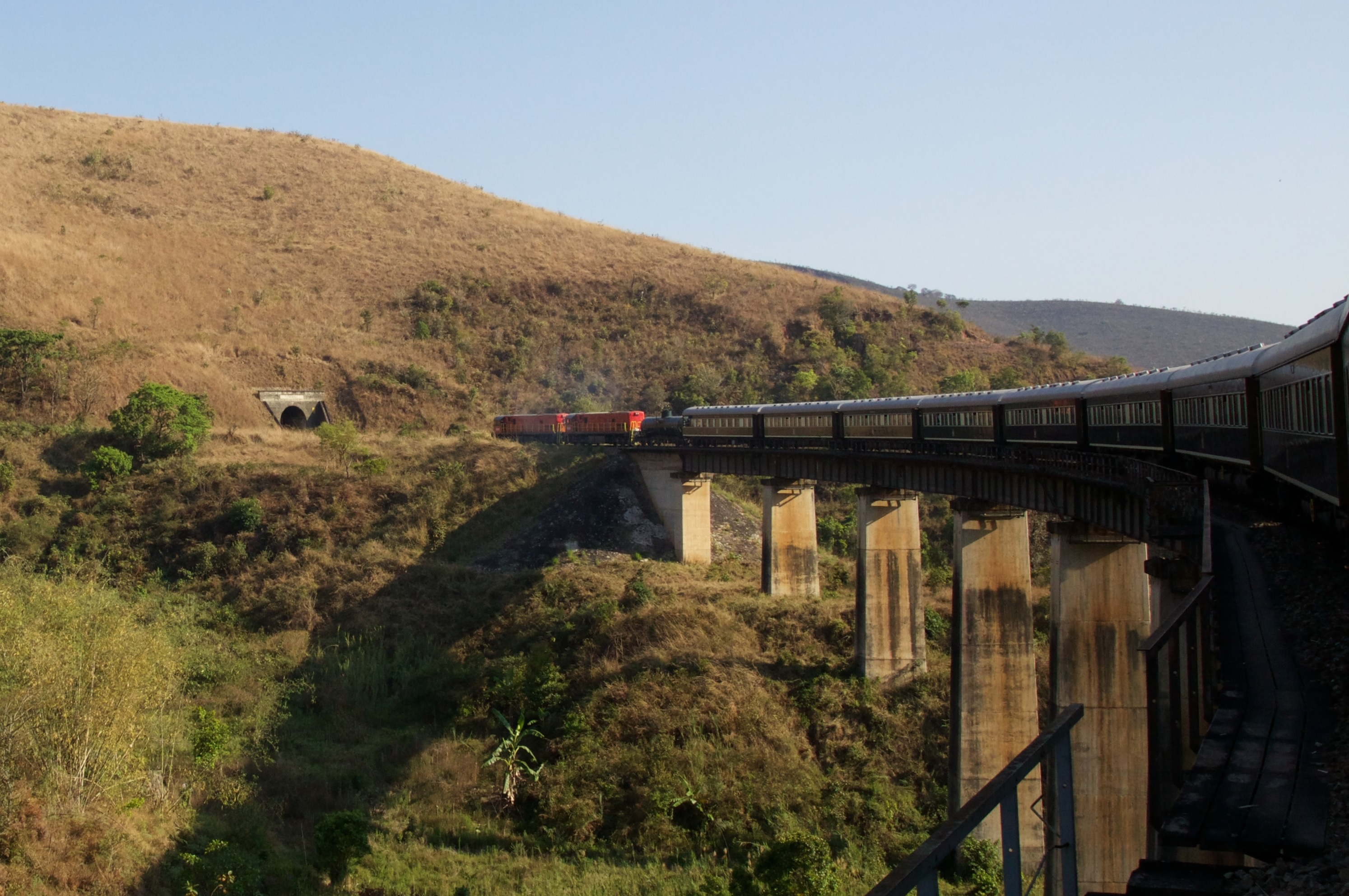
The Mpanga River Bridge and tunnel

The section from Mlimba to Makambako crosses mountains and steep valleys. Almost 30 percent of the bridges, tunnels, viaducts, and earthworks of the entire route are located a 16-kilometre (10 mi) stretch of this section. The bridge across the Mpanga River is 49 metres (160 ft) in height, and the Irangi Number 3 Tunnel is 2.4 km (1 1/2 mi) long. After the work crews reached Zambia at the end of 1972, the terrain became much easier, and the track-laying machine could advance 3 km (2 mi) per day

The project pressed forward despite the enormous upheaval in China caused by the Cultural Revolution, during which most domestic railway projects were delayed as many government officials were purged. President Liu Shaoqi, who had made the offer to President Nyerere in 1965, was removed from power in 1966, publicly vilified and died in 1969. In Tanzania, Abdulrahman Mohamed Babu, who had persuaded the Chinese to back the TAZARA, was sentenced to death in 1972 for allegedly plotting to overthrow the Zanzibar government. He was pardoned by Nyerere in 1978.

The first passenger train arrived in Dar es Salaam on 24 October 1975, the 11th anniversary of Zambia's independence from Great Britain.

=== Initial difficulties ===
The TAZARA has been a major economic conduit in the region notwithstanding operating difficulties from the start and never reaching its design capacity of 5 million metric tons. In the first two years of operation, TAZARA carried over 1.1 million metric tons of cargo annually. The diesel hydraulic locomotives sent by the Chinese were insufficiently powerful to haul heavy loads up the steep escarpment between Mlimba and Makambako, limiting the line's carrying capacity. When the Chinese rolling stock broke down, there was limited local capacity for repair. By 1978, 19 to 27 of the locomotives were out of operation, as were half of the rail cars.

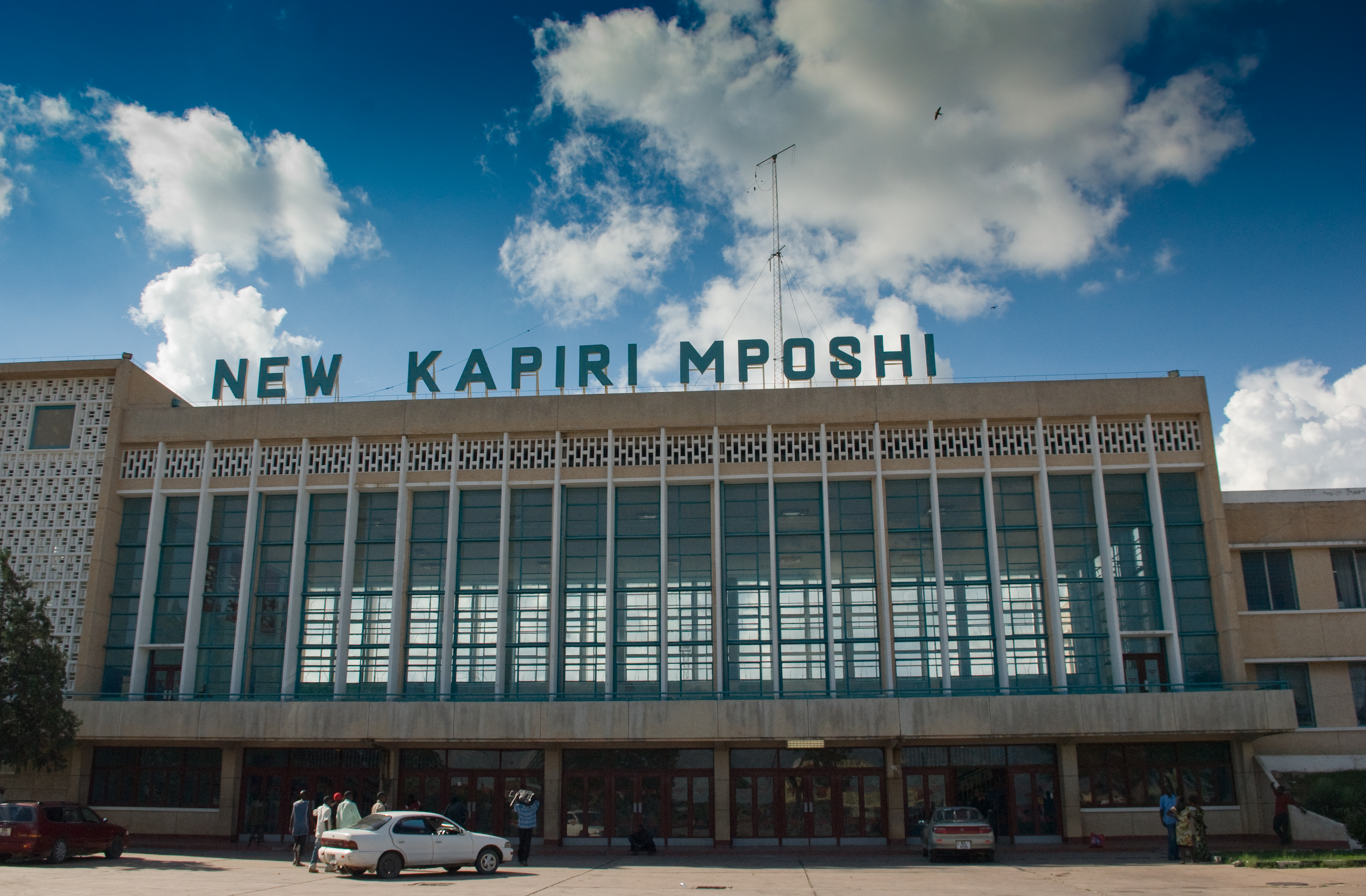
The new Kapiri Mposhi Station in 2009

The railway was also beset with staff difficulties. In their haste to complete the railway, the Chinese did not train enough African technicians to take over management of the railway. In 1972, two hundred Tanzanian and Zambian students were enrolled in the Northern Jiaotong University in Beijing to learn railway management, but a dozen of them were expelled in the first year for misbehavior. Employee theft was so common that 20 Zambian crew members were fired in 1978 for stealing, drivers were brought back from China for a return run, and hundreds of other Chinese advisers had their stay extended. These problems resulted in much lengthier than planned turnaround times for freight, and in 1978 Zambia had to break ranks and reopen links with white-ruled Rhodesia for its copper exports.

TAZARA played an important role in the black nationalist struggles of the late 1970s and 1980s. The railway served as a trade route for Zambia, Zimbabwe, and Malawi that did not pass through apartheid South Africa, or Angola or Mozambique, which were embroiled in civil wars with South African-backed proxies. During Zimbabwe's struggle for independence, the white Rhodesian government targeted ZIPRA's supply lines from Tanzania. Rhodesian forces also attacked and destroyed three bridges; the Chambeshi River Bridge was blown up by the Selous Scouts in 1979 and required one year to reconstruct. As a result of these difficulties, cargo transport fell below 800,000 tons per annum from 1979/80 to 1982/83. In addition, landslides and washouts frequently disrupted service, especially during the rainy seasons of 1979 and 1985/86.

=== Foreign support in the 1980s ===
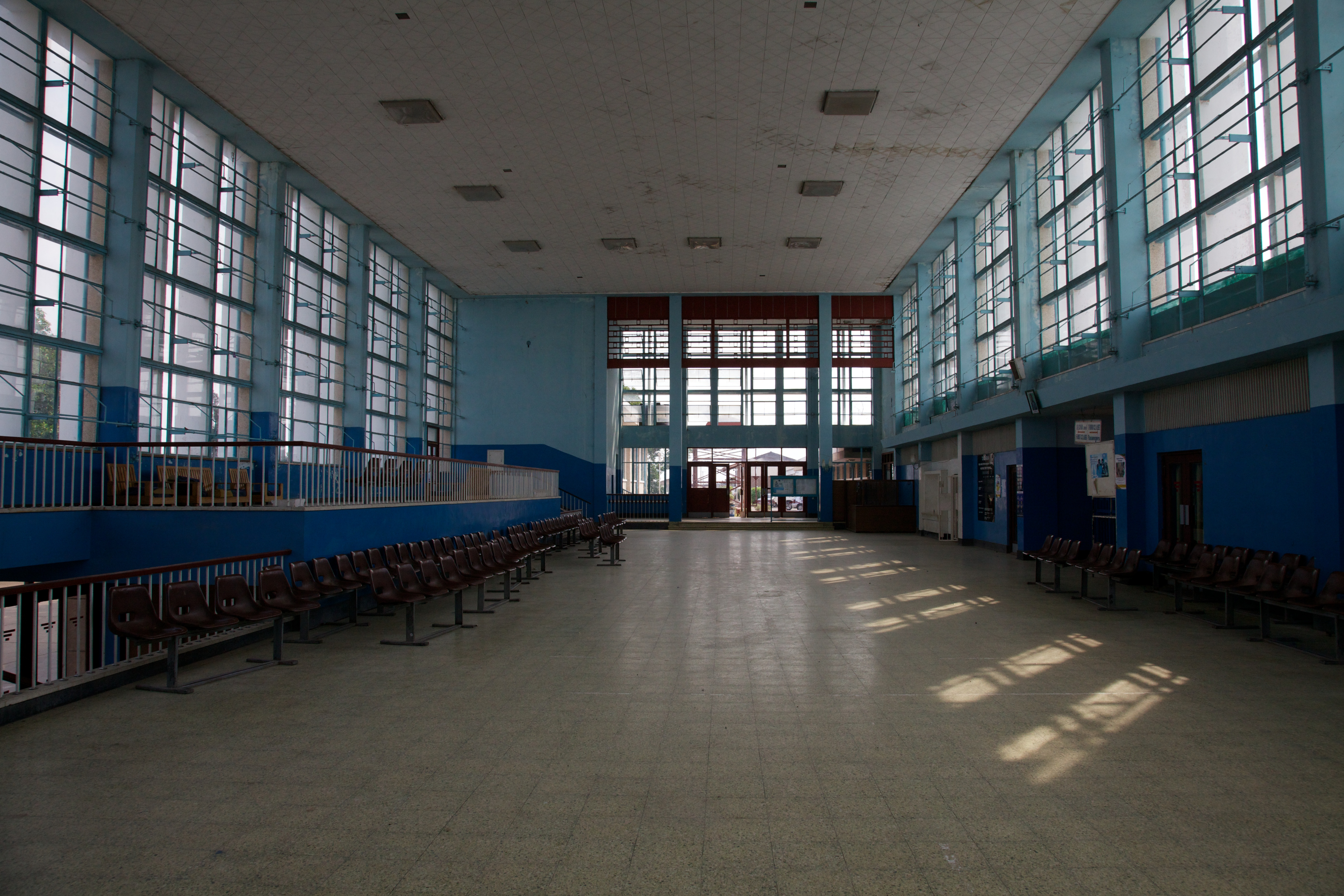
The interior of the New Kapiri Mposhi Station in October 2012

In 1983, Tanzania and Zambia invited the Chinese back to help manage the railway. About 250 Chinese managers were assigned to railway bureaus along the route. They brought operational profitability to the railway and paid for their expenses through revenues, but China had to issue additional zero-interest loans to pay for spare parts and rehabilitation. From 1987 to 1993, foreign aid totaling $150 million was supplied by the European Economic Community, Austria, Denmark, Finland, France, West Germany, Norway, Sweden, and Switzerland.

In 1987, the United States also joined in the donor efforts to improve the TAZARA and reduce the dependency of "frontline states" on South Africa. A 1987 report commissioned for the USAID identified inadequate motive power and poor equipment maintenance as constraints to operational capacity. The report found TAZARA mechanics to be poorly trained and supervised, many being illiterate, and faced with the need to maintain a diverse set of equipment from different donor countries. The USAID then funded a $50 million program over seven years, providing locomotives, facilities, and training. Equipment repairs would only "reduce some short-range problems", and the report highlighted the need to address "underlying causes", such as the locomotive workshops lacking basic supplies, and less than 20% of employees at the locomotive workshops being engaged in actual work.

Thanks to support from foreign donors, the cargo transported annually by TAZARA increased from 1.0 to 1.9 million metric tons in 1986 to 1991. The locomotive availability rate rose from 46% to 65%, and wagon turnaround time was reduced from 35 days to 20 days. Passenger traffic on the railway rebounded from 564,000 in the FY1982/83 to 1.6 million in FY1990/91. Local goods accounted for nearly half of the cargo shipped on the line between 1985 and 1988.

=== Decline ===
Abandoned rolling stock
along the TAZARA
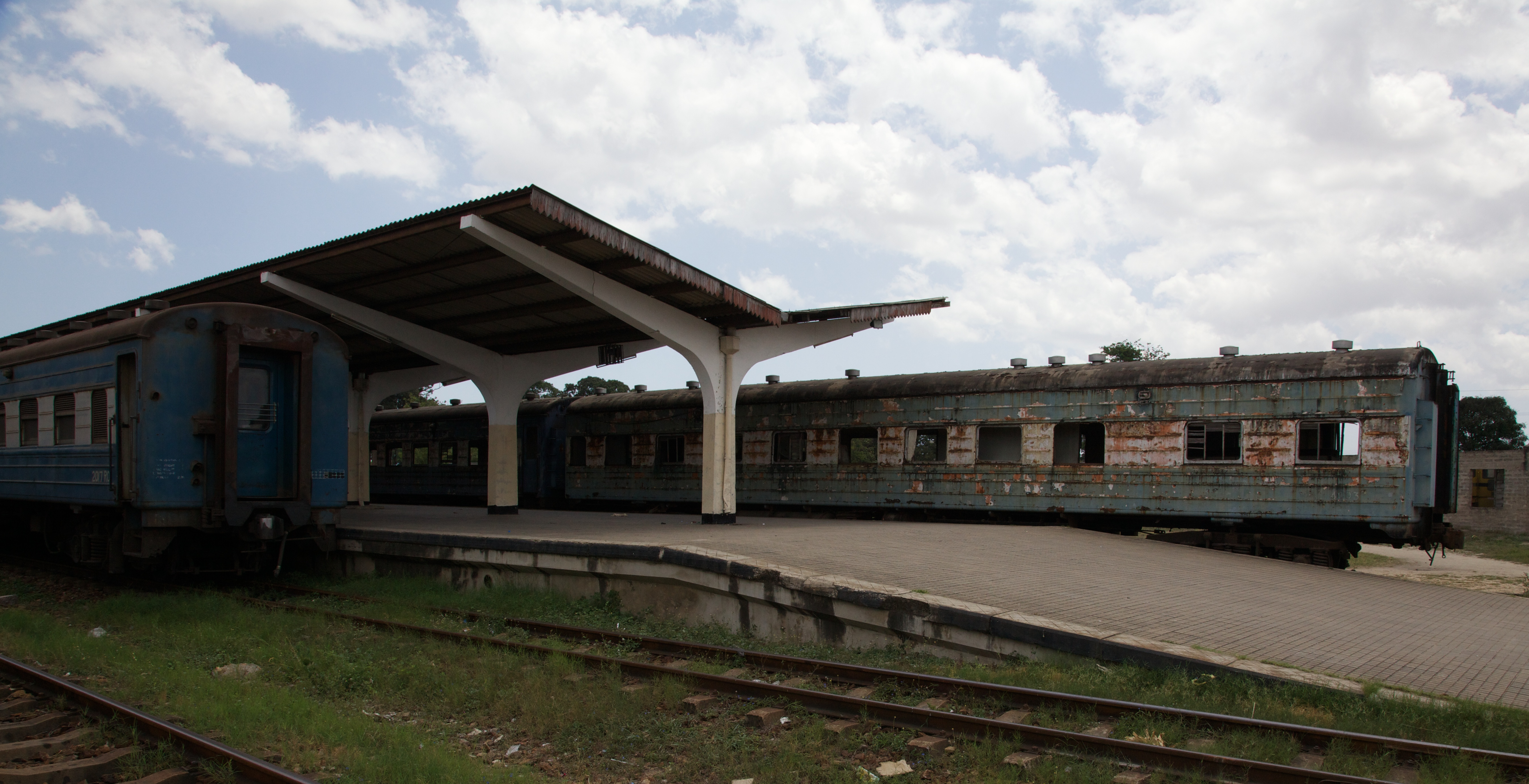
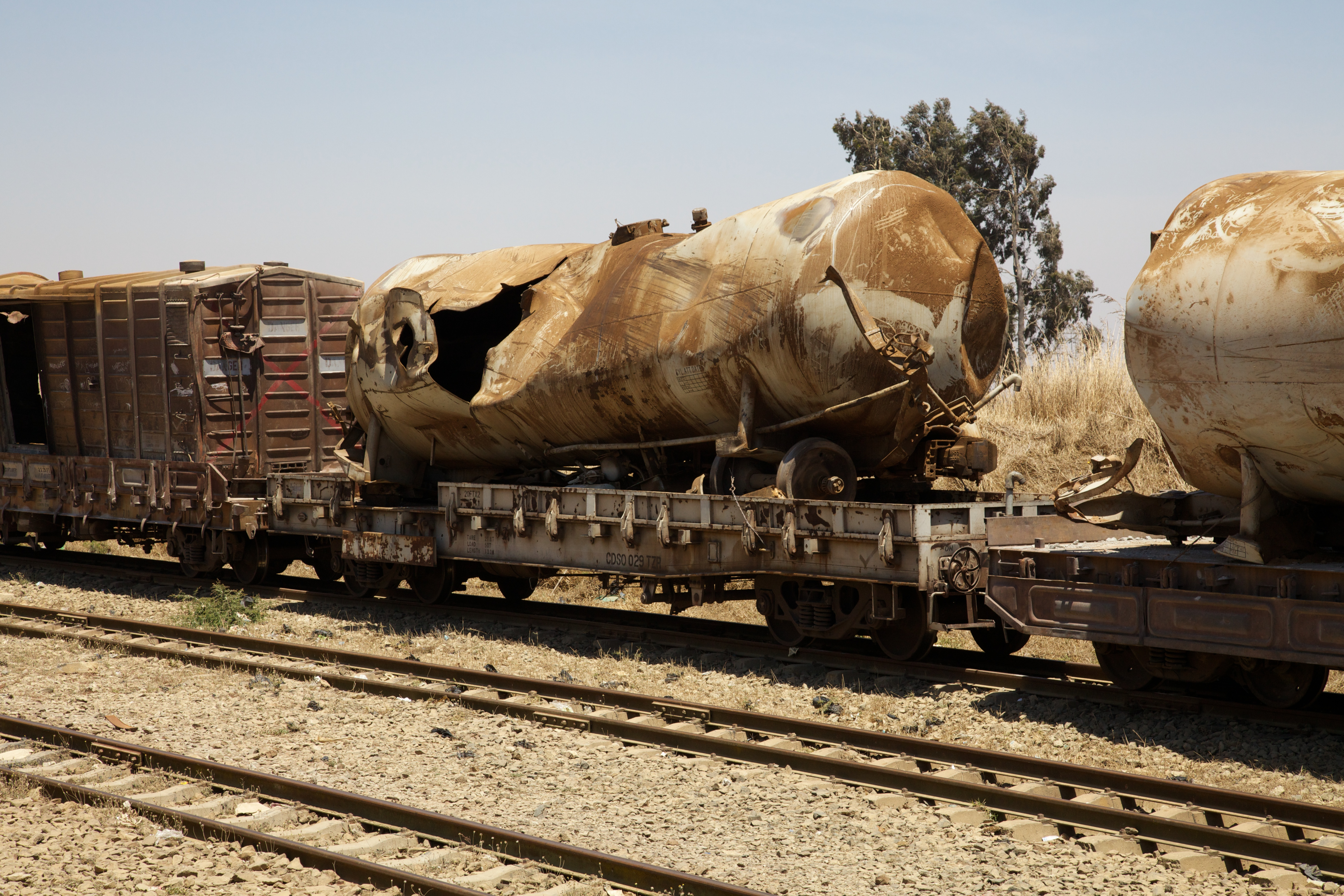
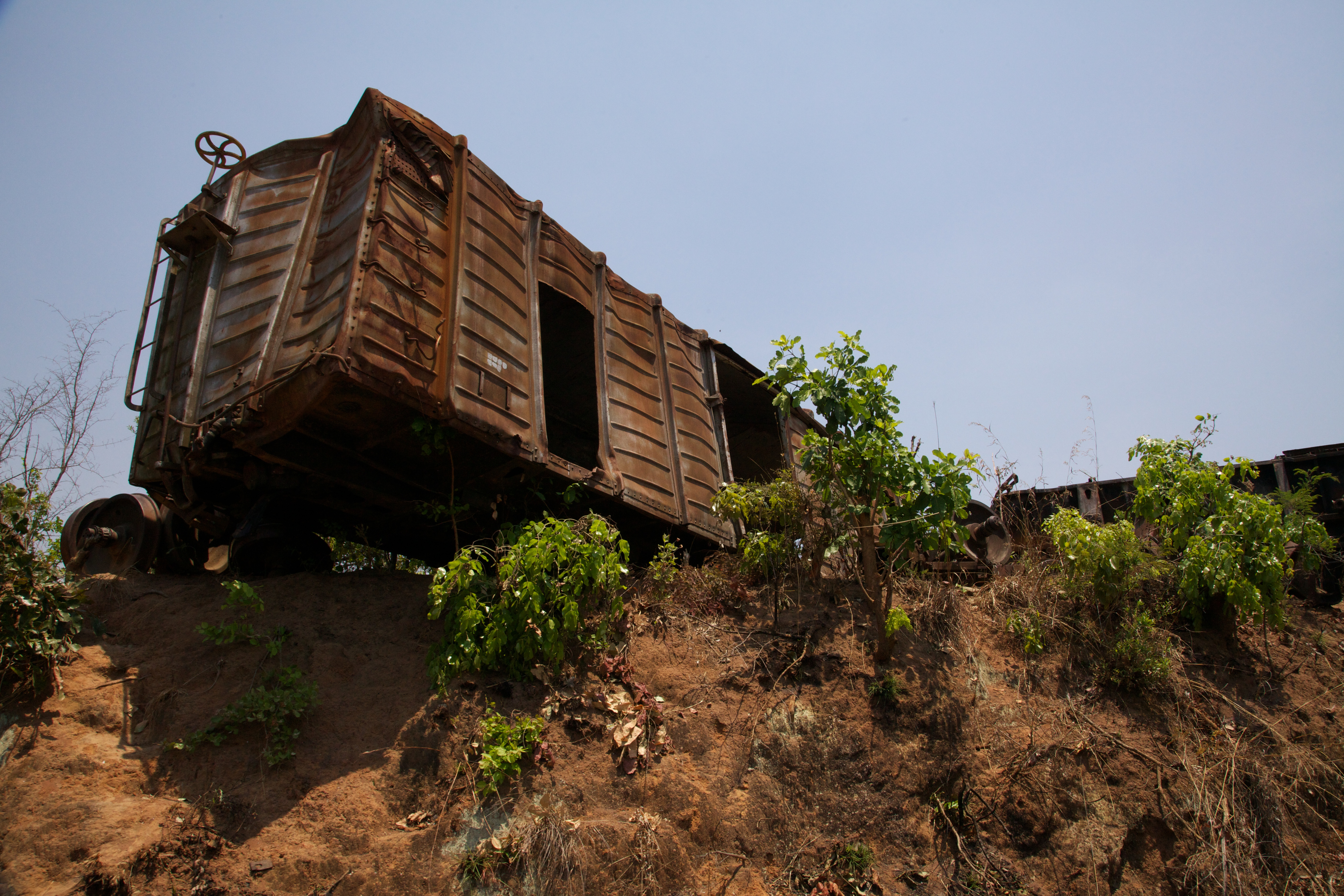
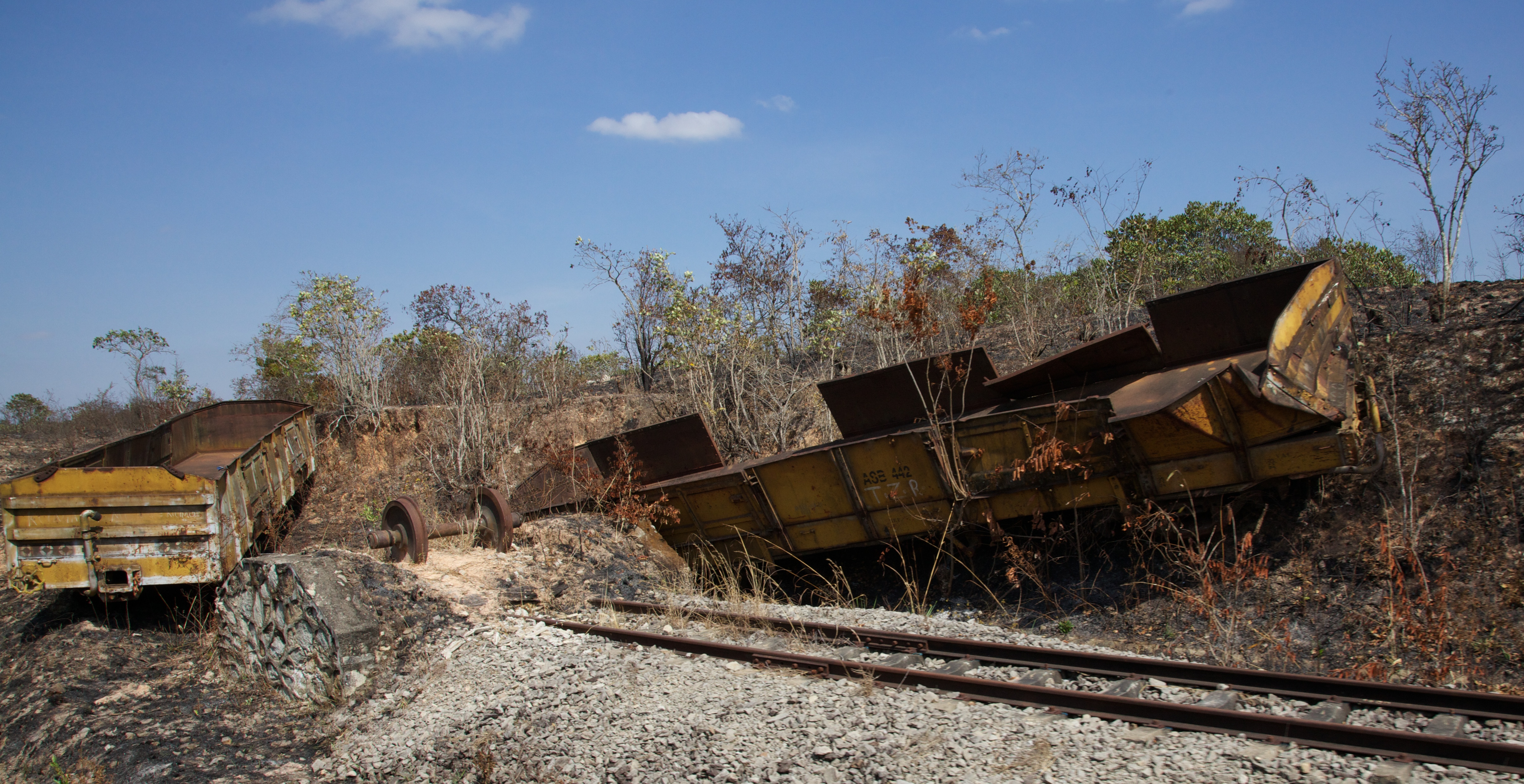
Photos taken in Oct. 2012

In the 1990s, the economic performance of the railway began to decline with changes to the broader economic and political environment. With the independence of Namibia in 1990 and multiracial elections in South Africa in 1994, southern Africa was no longer dominated by white minority governments, and Zambian copper had more economic outlets to the south and east. Road transport provided competition in the form of the Trans–Caprivi Highway and the Walvis Bay Corridor to Namibia.

The privatization of Zambia's copper mines forced railways in Zambia to compete for previously guaranteed government cargo. Traffic on Zambian Railways fell from 6 million tonnes in 1975 to 690,000 tonnes in 2009. TAZARA suffered an even greater drop in traffic.

In the early 2000s, the end of civil wars in Angola and Mozambique opened further rail outlets for Zambian copper. In 2008, the railway's condition was described as being "on the verge of collapse due to financial crisis," and dangerous track conditions were discovered by Chinese technicians inspecting the line. The company's cash flow difficulties have led to delays in paying salaries, resulting in frequent strikes by the workforce. By 2012, TAZARA had only 10 operational main line locomotives. In September 2013, the TAZARA was reporting $1.53 million in monthly revenue against $2.5 million in monthly expenditures.

=== Attempts at revitalization ===
The railway is sometimes described as an economic "lifeline" for Zambia and the government in Lusaka has ostensibly remained committed to its revitalization. In April 2013, Zambia’s second largest copper miner, Konkola Copper Mines, agreed to re-commence shipping copper on the TAZARA after a five-year hiatus. By November 2013, the line was reportedly shipping 15,000 tons of copper weekly, but still prone to breakdowns and delays. In addition to carrying copper, manganese, cobalt and other minerals for export, the TAZARA also transports Asian imports and fertilizer to Zambia, Congo, Malawi, Burundi, and Rwanda.

The Chinese government has also been unwilling to see the complete shutdown of its signature foreign aid project. In 2011, China cancelled half of the debts it was owed by the TAZARA. Since the loan was interest-free and not indexed for inflation, the real value of the debt had also shrunk by more than 80%. (Note: $406 million in 1970 was the equivalent of US $2.35 billion in 2011)

Additional Chinese aid has kept TAZARA in a state of minimal operation. In 2010, the Chinese government gave TAZARA a US$39 million interest-free loan, but TAZARA management estimated that it would require US$770 million to become commercially viable. In 2012, the Chinese government gave another $42 million for equipment and training. In March 2014, Tanzanian, Zambian and Chinese officials held talks to recapitalize the TAZARA and to split it into a Tanzanian company and a Zambian company. The Tanzania-Zambia Railway Authority took delivery in 2015 of four diesel-electric locomotives and 18 coaches from China. TAZARA’s Dar es Salaam workshop has also begun a programme to refurbish 24 out-of-use coaches.

In FY2014/15, freight traffic fell to 88,000 metric tons in Fiscal Year (FY) but rebounded to 130,000 tons in FY2015/16. The growth continued further, reaching 210,161 tons in FY2021/2022.

In 2018, TAZARA and South African firm Calabash Freight reached an agreement for the latter to use the line in order to maximise line utilization. In FY2018/19, total utilization reached 362,710 tons.

In February 2024, China's ambassador to Zambia, Du Xiaohui, submitted a proposal to the Zambian transport minister for a billion dollar refurbishment project of the railway. That August, the China Civil and Engineering and Construction Corporation (CCECC) was reportedly "on track" to finance and execute the rail upgrade.

==== Standard gauge railway ====
On August 3, 2022, during a state visit by Zambian president Hakainde Hichilema to Tanzania, the presidents of both nations issued a joint statement to launch a new project to revitalize the railway and build to standard gauge through a public-private partnership.

In August 2023, officials from both countries agreed to ask the government of China to put forward a comprehensive proposal for the revitalization of the TAZARA line and its upgrade to standard gauge. China is seeking a concession to operate the railway.

In November 2023, China Civil Engineering Construction Corporation (CCECC) was shortlisted to submit a proposal for the concession. The following month, the Tanzania-Zambia Railway Authority announced an inspection of the railway line to be carried out by CCECC experts with the aim of assessing its operational and business model, and setting the stage for the submission by CCECC of an optimized TAZARA revitalization proposal. The 11-member team was led by the managing director of the Addis Abeba-Djibouti Railway.

In February 2024, the Chinese ambassador to Zambia presented the Zambian transport minister with CCECC's proposal to revamp the TAZARA at a cost of $1 billion. A corresponding MoU was signed in September 2024.

==== Re-vitalization ====
In September 2025, China, Zambia, and Tanzania signed a $1.4 billion agreement to modernize the aging Tanzania–Zambia Railway Authority (Tazara) line. In early 2026 the modernization project moved into active implementation as the CCECC began mobilizing equipment and technical personnel under a 30 year concession. A major milestone occurred February 10th, 2026, which brought back the weekly Mukuba train connection between Dar es Salaam and Kipri Mposhi following an 18 week suspension. The current stage focuses on a PPP (Public-Private Partnership) model, with $1 billion dedicated to repairing track infrastructure and safety measures, and $400 million for 32 more locomotives and 762 wagons to replace the aging fleet.

== Statistics ==
Freight volume

Year	metric tons	±% p.a.
1977	1,135,000	—
1978	1,273,000	+12.16%
1979	923,000	−27.49%
1980	790,000	−14.41%
1981	752,000	−4.81%
1982	796,000	+5.85%
1983	824,000	+3.52%
1984	973,000	+18.08%
1985	1,096,000	+12.64%
1986	984,000	−10.22%

Year	metric tons	±% p.a.
1987	1,221,000	+24.09%
1988	1,204,000	−1.39%
1989	1,075,000	−10.71%
1991	1,011,823	−2.98%
2007	538,500	−3.87%
2008	527,600	−2.02%
2009	383,000	−27.41%
2010	523,000	+36.55%
2014	203,538	−21.02%
2015	88,000	−56.76%

Year	metric tons	±% p.a.
2016	130,000	+47.73%
2017	171,000	+31.54%
2018	220,818	+29.13%
2019	362,710	+64.26%
2020	378,978	+4.49%
2021	392,081	+3.46%
2022	188,782	−51.85%
2023	301,040	+59.46%
2024	235,746	−21.69%
2025		—

Year	metric tons	±% p.a.
2026		—
2027		—
2028		—
2029		—
2030		—
2031		—
2032		—
2033		—
2034		—
2035		—

Source: FY1977/78 to FY1988/89; FY2006/07 to FY2009/10; FY2014/15; FY2013/14 FY2015/16; FY2016/17 to FY2019/20

Passenger volume

Year	thousands	±% p.a.
1977	826	—
1978	1,134	+37.29%
1979	1,312	+15.70%
1980	1,397	+6.48%
1981	1,024	−26.70%
1982	987	−3.61%
1983	564	−42.86%
1984	1,198	+112.41%
1985	1,065	−11.10%
1986	1,161	+9.01%
1987	1,335	+14.99%
1988	1,400	+4.87%
1989	1,677	+19.79%
1990		—

Year	thousands	±% p.a.
1991		—
1992		—
1993		—
1994		—
1995		—
1996		—
1997		—
1998		—
1999		—
2000		—
2001		—
2002		—
2003		—
2004		—

Year	thousands	±% p.a.
2005		—
2006		—
2007		—
2008		—
2009		—
2010		—
2011		—
2012		—
2013		—
2014		—
2015		—
2016		—
2017		—
2018		—

Year	thousands	±% p.a.
2019	3,000	—
2020	2,800	−6.67%
2021		—
2022		—
2023		—
2024		—
2025		—
2026		—
2027		—
2028		—
2029		—
2030		—

Source: FY1977/78 to FY1988/89; FY2019/20

== Social impact ==
The TAZARA has had a strong impact on the rural regions along route. In the 1970s, the Tanzanian government resettled villagers into ujamaa villages that were near the railway. The villages were tasked with providing security for the railway against foreign sabotage. As the Tanzanian economy liberalized in the 1990s, the villagers began to use the railway to trade local produce. However, this impact was not entirely positive. Many rural households relocated to be closer to the new railway were forced to do so, and the government failed to compensate farmers for crops lost in construction for years after the railway was finished.

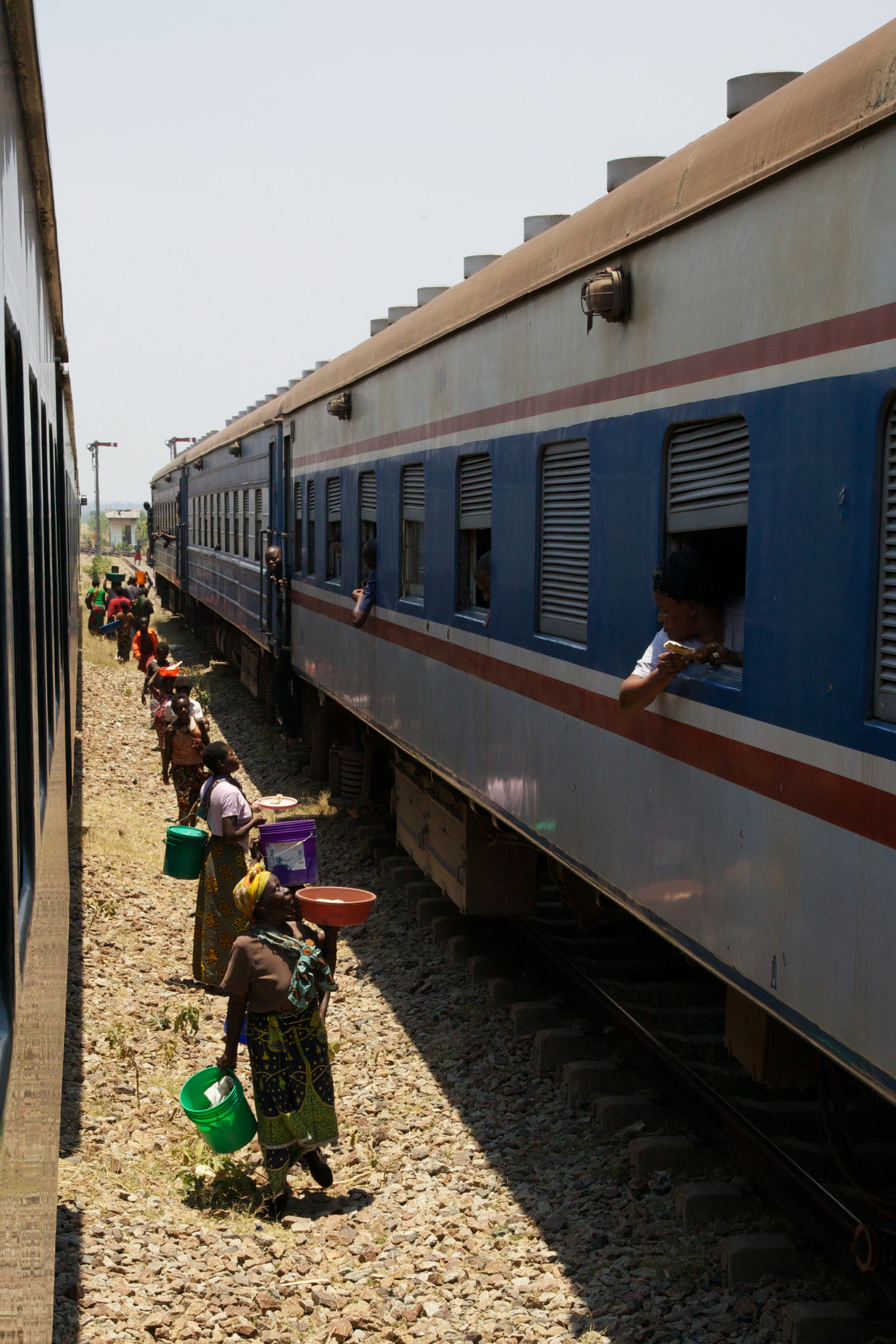
Vendors selling items to passengers on the Mukuba Express Train

The railway also enabled settlers to move to the fertile Kilombero River Valley, between Mbeya and Kidatu, to grow cash crops such as rice and vegetables that they can readily ship to other communities. As the TAZARA traverses diverse ecosystems, it facilitates trade in local produce across previously isolated communities, including maize, beans and vegetables from the highlands of Makambako, rice from Ifakara, oranges from Mlimba, and bananas from Mngeta and Idete. The TAZARA ran the kipsi shuttle trains in the "passenger belt" of southern Tanzania to serve the region. Many settlements have grown into large towns and districts.

The TAZARA also spurred other large-scale economic developments in the region, including a hydroelectric power plant at Kidatu and a paper mill at Rufiji.

The TAZARA Railway Authority has also become a large state employer. In 40 years of operation, as many as one million people have been employed by the railway. Chinese involvement has also been credited for increasing the opportunities of women to enter male-dominated jobs such as train driver.

== Legacy ==
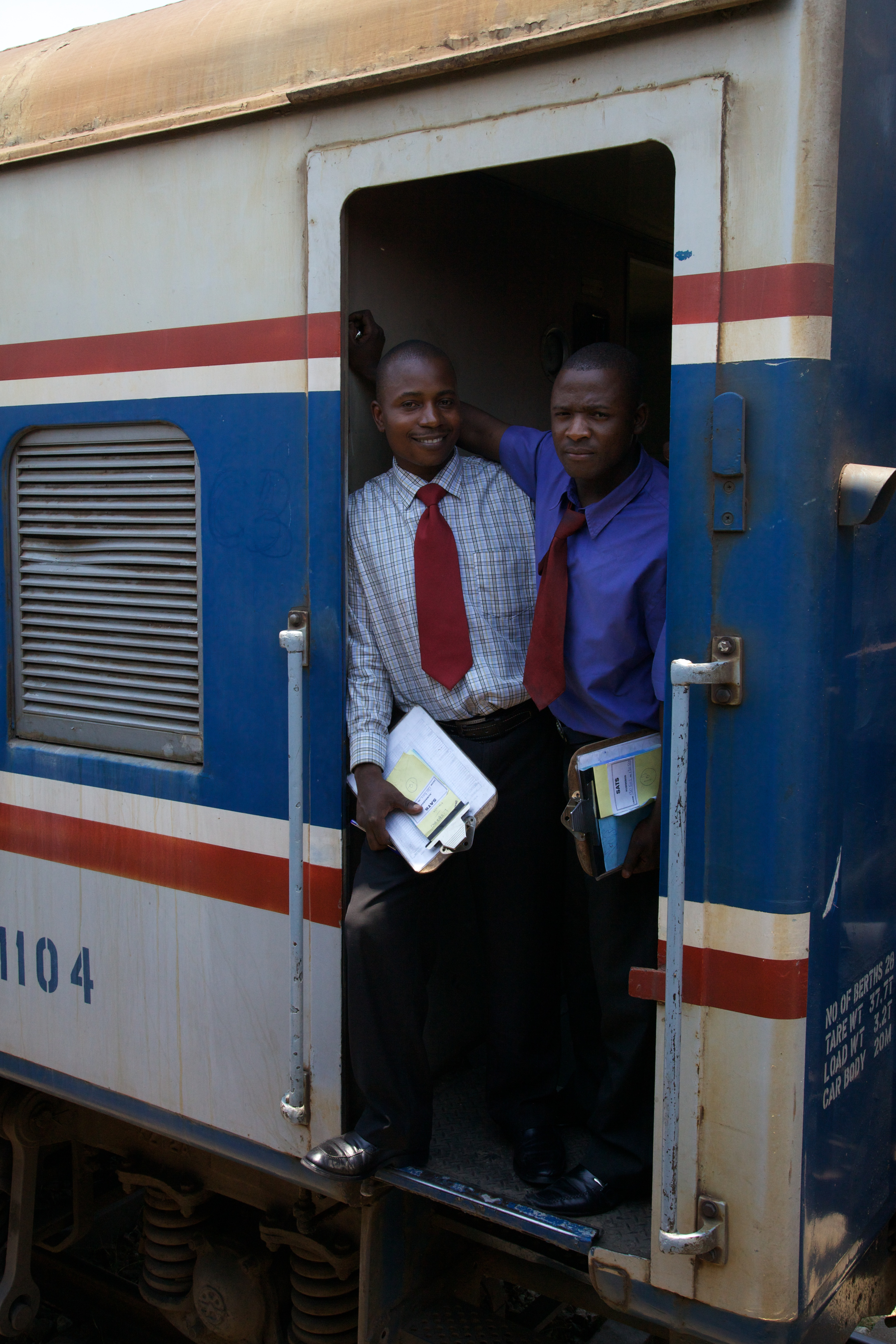
Zambian TAZARA staff in Kapiri Mposhi in 2012

]When Beijing hosted the 2008 Summer Olympic Games, the starting point of the torch relay in Tanzania was the grand terminal of the TAZARA.

The difficulties with TAZARA made the Chinese government wary about funding other rail projects in Africa. China would not complete another new main line railway in Africa for another 41 years. A new era in Chinese railway construction in Africa began in 2016–2017 with the inauguration of the Abuja–Kaduna Railway in Nigeria, the Addis Ababa–Djibouti Railway in Ethiopia and Djibouti, and the Mombasa–Nairobi Standard Gauge Railway in Kenya. To avoid repeating the problems of TAZARA, the Chinese government took measures to limit the financial and operational risk of the new railways. TAZARA had been 100% funded by an interest-free loan from China, but the new railways were financed through interest-bearing loans and required the recipient government to supply matching funds. TAZARA had been handed over immediately to the Tanzanian and Zambian governments, but most of the new railways were concessioned to Chinese operating companies for the first 3–5 years.

== See also ==
- East African Railway Master Plan
- Tanzania Railways Corporation
- Transport in Tanzania
- Transport in Zambia
- Zambia Railways
- Railway stations in Tanzania
- Railway stations in Zambia
- Rail transport in Zambia
- List of tunnels by location
- Addis Ababa–Djibouti Railway

== Maps ==
- UN map Tanzania
- UN Map Zambia

== Sources ==
- Altorfer-Ong, Alicia (2009). "Tanzanian 'Freedom' and Chinese 'Friendship' in 1965: laying the tracks for the TanZam rail link" (PDF). LSE Ideas. London School of Economics (LSE): 655–670. Archived from the original (PDF) on 3 October 2012.
- Ball, Peter (17 November 2015). "The Tanzania - Zambia Railway". The Heritage Portal.
- Brautigam, Deborah (2010). The Dragon's Gift: The Real Story of China in Africa. Oxford University Press. ISBN 978-0199550227.
- Hall, Richard Seymour; Peyman, Hugh (1976). The Great Uhuru Railway: China's Showpiece in Africa. Gollancz. ISBN 057502089X.
- Monson, Jamie (2009). Africa's Freedom Railway: How a Chinese Development Project Changed Lives and Livelihoods in Tanzania. Indiana University Press. ISBN 978-0253002815.
- Preston, Matthew (2005). Ending Civil War: Rhodesia and Lebanon in Perspective. Tauris Academic Studies. ISBN 978-1850435792.
- Wolfe, Alvin W. "Tanzania-Zambia Railway: Escape Route from Neocolonial Control?" Nonaligned Third World Annual. St. Louis: Books International of D.H.-T.E. International, 1970. 92-103.
