= Cemetery of Chinese Experts in Tanzania =

Coordinates: 6.8865°S 39.154°E

The Chinese Experts Cemetery (中国援坦专家公墓) is situated in Gongo la Mboto, a western suburb of Dar es Salaam, the capital of Tanzania. It is the final resting place for more than 60 Chinese experts who died during the construction of the Tanzanian-Zambian Railway. A large alabaster monument stands at the center of the cemetery, with the words "Cemetery of Chinese Experts" engraved in gold in both Chinese and Kiswahili.

== Background ==
In the 1960s and 1970s, China undertook the ambitious project of constructing a railway connecting Tanzania and Zambia. This effort involved the participation of 50,000 Chinese workers, with up to 16,000 on-site at the peak of construction. Unfortunately, the project claimed the lives of several Chinese personnel due to various circumstances: workplace accidents, such as Mao Zhongman, who perished in a bulldozer accident on January 4, 1971; road accidents, like Li Jingpu, who died on April 15, 1971; and encounters with local wildlife, such as Zang Mincai, who succumbed to a honeybee sting. In total, 64 Chinese experts lost their lives, although this number varies in different reports depending on how causes of death and identities are categorized. Some of the deceased were laid to rest in Tanzania, while others were buried in Zambia. The youngest expert buried in the Chinese Experts Cemetery was only 22 years old.

== Remembrance ==
The Tanzanian government has designated specialists to maintain the cemetery, ensuring its preservation. Each year, during the Qingming Festival, both Chinese and Tanzanian representatives visit the cemetery to pay their respects. Chinese government and Communist Party officials, including General Secretary of the Chinese Communist Party Xi Jinping, as well as members of the Chinese People's Liberation Army Navy, have made visits to the cemetery during their time in Tanzania. Local residents also visit occasionally to honor the memory of those buried there.

== See also ==
- TAZARA Memorial Park
