= Issuna =

- Village
- Location within Tanzania
- Coordinates: 05°23′00″S 34°46′00″E
- Country: Tanzania

Population (2002)
  - Total: 11,285

Issuna is a village and administrative ward in the Singida Rural district of the Singida Region of Tanzania. According to the 2002 census, the ward has a total population of 11,285.

It lies approximately 40 miles (64 km) south of the town of Singida and about 90 miles (140 km) north east of the national capital Dodoma.

== Transport ==
Issuna has a railway station on the Singida branch line from Manyoni junction. It is also situated on the B141 road.

== Incidents ==
In January 1963, there was an incident involving two lions and livestock. The lions killed 3 donkeys and 244 cattle before being shot.

== See also ==
- East Africa
