= Railway stations in Tanzania =

Railways in Tanzania. Red 1,000 mm (3 ft 3 3/8 in) gauge. Orange 1,067 mm (3 ft 6 in) gauge.

Railway stations in Tanzania include:

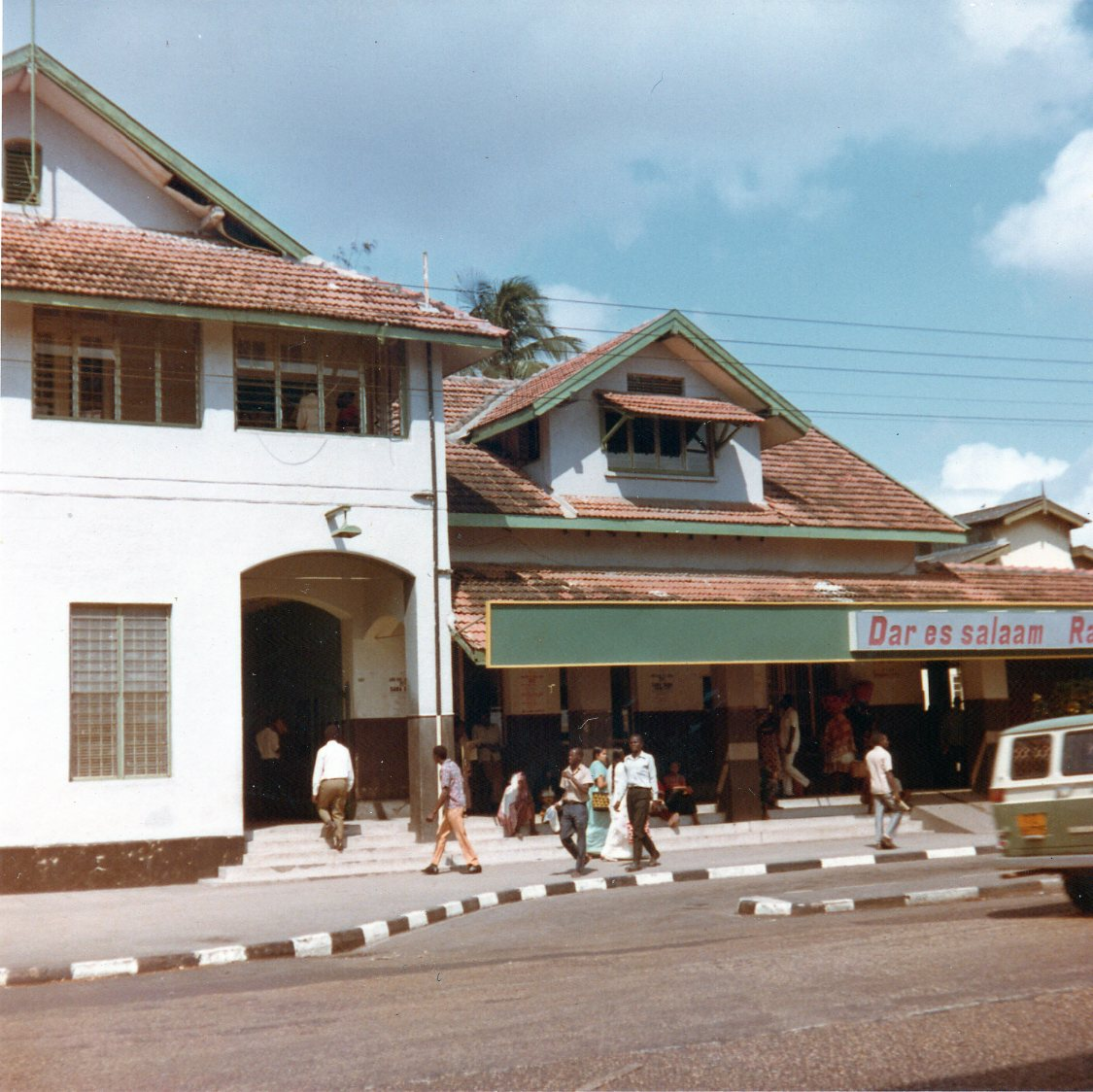
The Dar es Salaam railway station, Central line, in the year 1973.

- Tanzania Standard Gauge Railway

== Maps ==
- UN Map - Tanga and Kidatu lines not shown.
- Railways in southern Africa
- Official map
- UNHCR Map
- Look for the MSN Map at the bottom of pages of many towns, or look for the Map Button at the top and scroll down the MSN map.

== Towns served by rail ==
=== Tanzania Railways Corporation ===
( all 1,000 mm (3 ft 3 3/8 in) gauge)

==== Central Line ====
1. Dar es Salaam - ocean port - former national capital - 8 km from TAZARA line
2. Ruvu (75m) - junction to Tanga line
3. Morogoro (510m) - junction to north
4. Kilosa (572m) - junction going south to TAZARA
5. Gulwe (680m)
6. Igandu (985m)
7. Dodoma (1148m) - The national capital
8. Manyoni (1244m) - junction going north to Singida
9. Itigi (1306m)
10. Ikungu (1289m)
11. Tabora (1212m) - junction going north to Mwanza
12. Kaliua (1112m) - junction going south to Mpanda
13. Kigoma (775m) - terminal and port on Lake Tanganyika

==== Kidatu Line ====
1. (Not shown on map)
2. Kilosa (572m) - junction
3. Kidatu (294m) - branch terminus - also served with break of gauge by TAZARA, with a container trans-shipment facility to move freight containers between TAZARA and Tanzania Railways Corporation trains

==== Mwanza Line ====
1. Tabora (1212m) - junction
2. Bukene (1188m)
3. Isaka (1197m) - 'dry port' and proposed junction for lines to Rwanda and Burundi
4. Shinyanga (1126m)
5. Mwanza (1209m) - inland port on Lake Victoria

==== Mpanda Line ====
1. Kaliua (1112m) - junction
2. Mpanda (1074m) - branch terminus

==== Singida Line ====
1. Manyoni (1244m) - junction
2. Issuna (1423m)
3. Ikungi (1532m)
4. Puma
5. Singida (1122m) - branch terminus

==== Link Line ====
1. Morogoro (510m) - junction with Central Line
2. Ruvu (75m)
3. Kitonga (65m)
4. Sadani (1m)
5. Hale (184m) - junction
6. Korogwe (301m) - junction with Tanga Line

==== Tanga line ====
1. Tanga (1m) - ocean port
2. Korogwe (301m) - junction to south
3. Mkomazi (485m)
4. Same (897m)
5. Moshi (990m) - junction to north and Kenya
6. Arusha (1254m) - soda ash mining

==== Proposed extensions ====
- September 2007
1. Arusha (1254m)
2. Musoma (1172m) on Lake Victoria.

1. Tanga
2. Mwambani Bay

- (1,435 mm (4 ft 8 1/2 in) gauge)
1. Tanga
2. Singida
3. Mutukula, Tanzania
- Mutukula, Uganda
- Kampala

- (branch)
- Mutukula
- Musoma - Lake Victoria port

==== Standard Gauge ====
1. Dar es Salaam
  1. Pugu (19 km)
  2. Soga (51 km)
2. Ruvu (74 km) - junction on old line only.
  1. Freight Yard (93 km)
  2. Ngerengere (135 km)
3. Morogoro (205 km) - end stage one - work started in April 2017.
4. Dodoma - capital
5. Makutupora - (336 km from previous station)
6. Tabora - (294 km)
7. Isaka - (133 km) - inland dry port
8. Mwanza - (249 km) - port city on Lake Victoria
9. Kigoma on Lake Tanganyika

==== Mtwara Line (Southern Province Railway) - (defunct) ====
In 1949 a line was built to link the Tanganyika groundnut scheme plantations around Nachingwea with the port of Mtwara. The scheme famously foundered and the railway was abandoned in 1962. Proposals have been made for a new railway to link Mtwara to iron ore deposits in the west, perhaps linking via Songea to Liganga.

==== Island of Unguja ====
A short 610 mm (2 ft) line lasted from 1879 to 1888.

==== Mtwara (rebuilt) ====
1. Mtwara (1 m) - port for groundnut scheme
2. Lindi (1 m) - potential port
3. Nachingwea (380 m) groundnut scheme terminus
4. Mchuchuma (____m) - coal
5. Songea
6. Liganga (1210 m) - iron ore

== TAZARA Railway ==
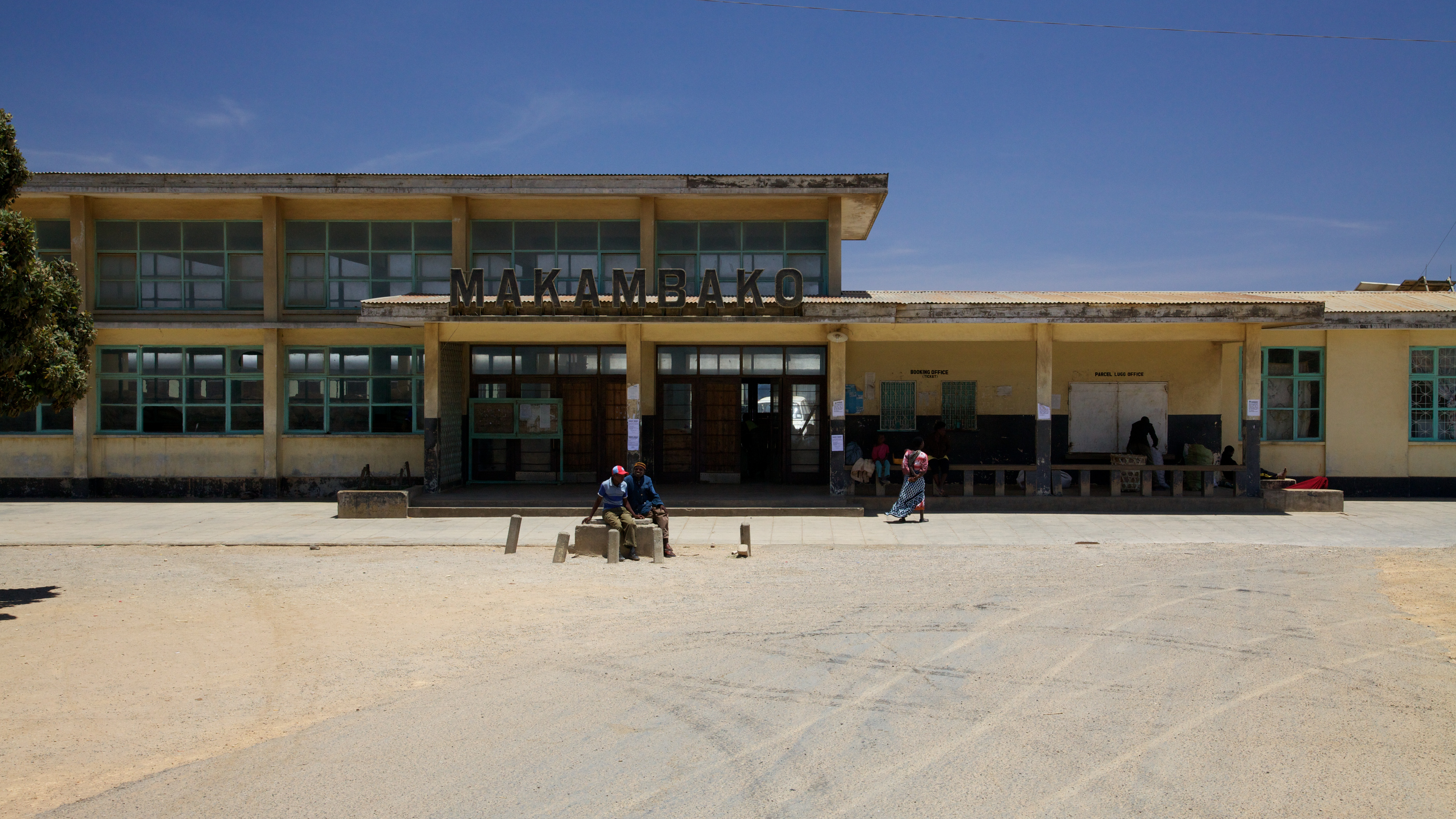
The Makambako Station.

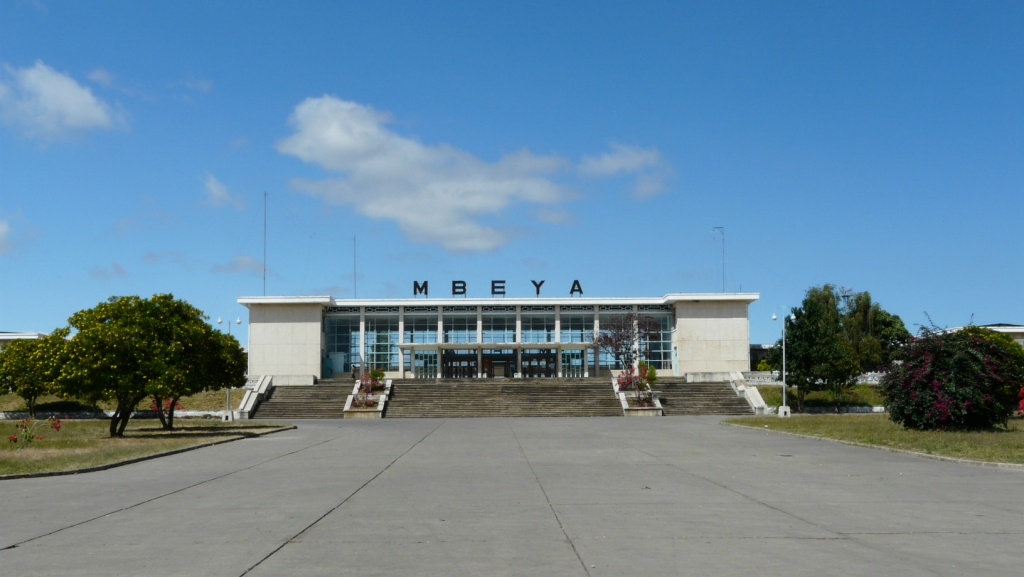
The Mbeya Station.

Formerly also called TanZam Railway.

1,067 mm (3 ft 6 in) gauge to match Zambian/Southern African networks.

1. Dar es Salaam - ocean port - 8 km from TRC line
2. Mzenga (137 m)
3. Kisaki (292 m)
4. Kidatu (294 m) - break of gauge connection with Tanzania Railways Corporation, with a container trans-shipment facility to move freight containers between TAZARA and Tanzania Railways Corporation trains. on short branch.
5. Mang'ula
6. Kiberege
7. Ifakara (192 m)
8. Lwipa
9. Mbingu
10. Mngeta
11. Chita
12. Mlimba
13. Makambako
14. Chimala
15. Mbeya (1661 m) - workshops
16. Mbozi
17. Vwawa (1274 m)
18. Tunduma, Tanzania (1301 m)
- (Zambia) - Tanzania / Zambian border
- Mkushi, Zambia (1277 m)

- Mbeya possible junction
- Kasanga

=== Rehabilitation ===
- North-South Corridor Project

== Gauge ==
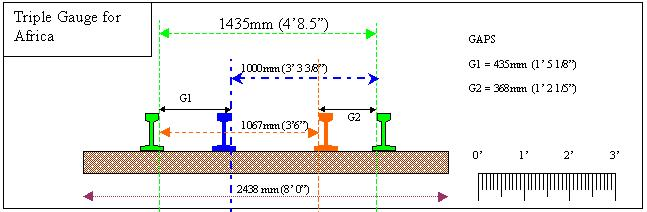
A triple gauge sleeper can handle the three main gauges found in Africa, including Tanzania: 1000 mm, 1067 mm and 1435 mm.

1,000 mm (3 ft 3 3/8 in) and 1,067 mm (3 ft 6 in) are too close to allow 3-rail dual gauge; you have to have 4-rail dual gauge. But if you have 4-rail gauge, then you can include 1,435 mm (4 ft 8 1/2 in) gauge (standard gauge) at the cost of slightly longer sleepers.

== Container port ==
The container port at Dar es Salaam is served by both 1,000 mm (3 ft 3 3/8 in) and 1,067 mm (3 ft 6 in) railway gauge tracks.

== See also ==
- History of rail transport in Tanzania
- Rail transport in Tanzania
- Railway stations in Kenya
- Railway stations in Zambia
- Railway stations in Rwanda
- Railway stations in Burundi
- Railway stations in Uganda
- Tanzania Railways Corporation
- Dual gauge
