= List of international presidential trips made by Samia Suluhu Hassan =

Samia Suluhu Hassan became President of Tanzania on 19 March 2021 following the sudden death of John Magufuli. She travelled extensively to various multi-lateral meetings on behalf of Magufuli when she was Vice-President. The following is a list of international presidential trips made by Samia Suluhu since assuming office.

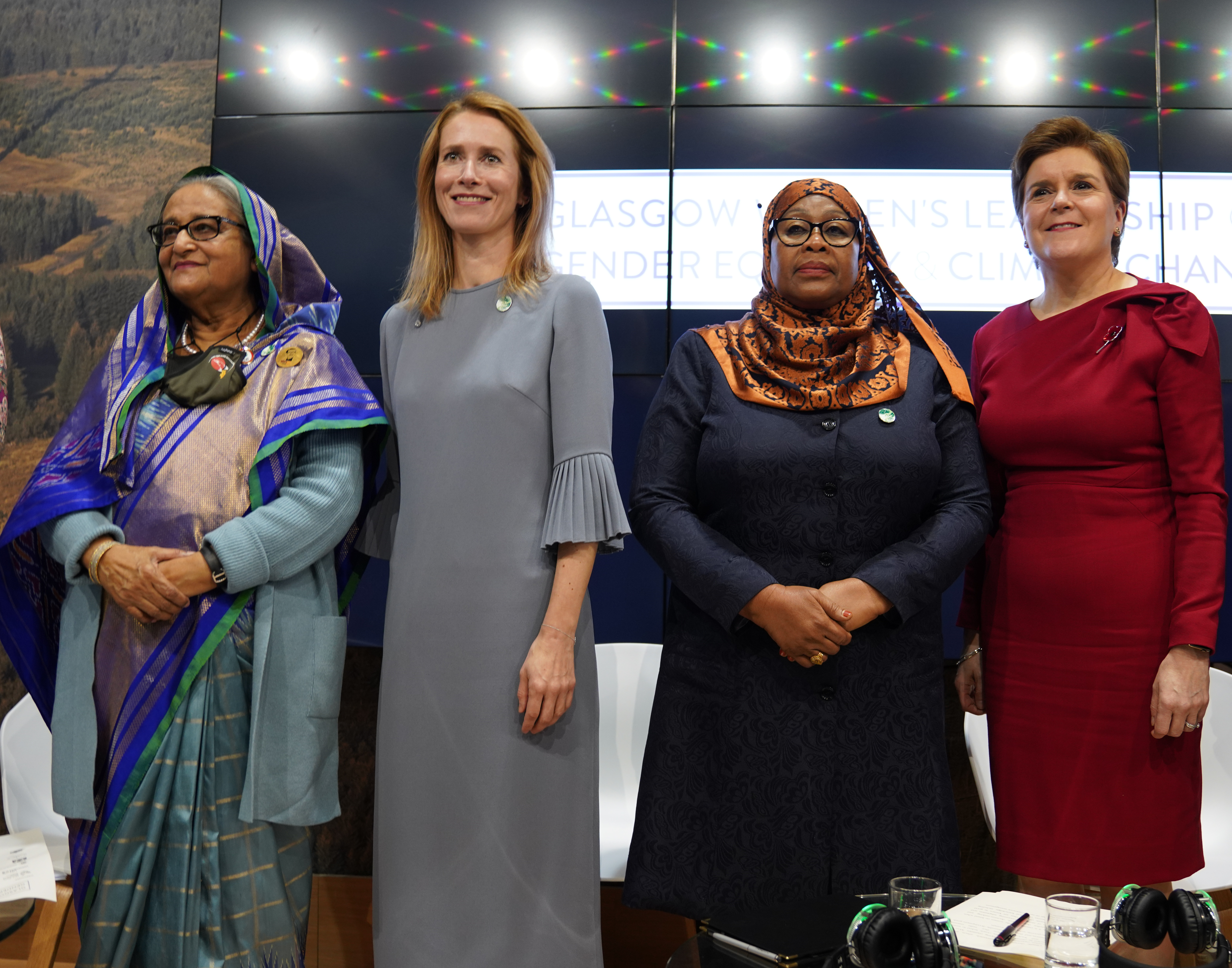
Samia Suluhu Hassan at COP26 in Glasgow in 2021

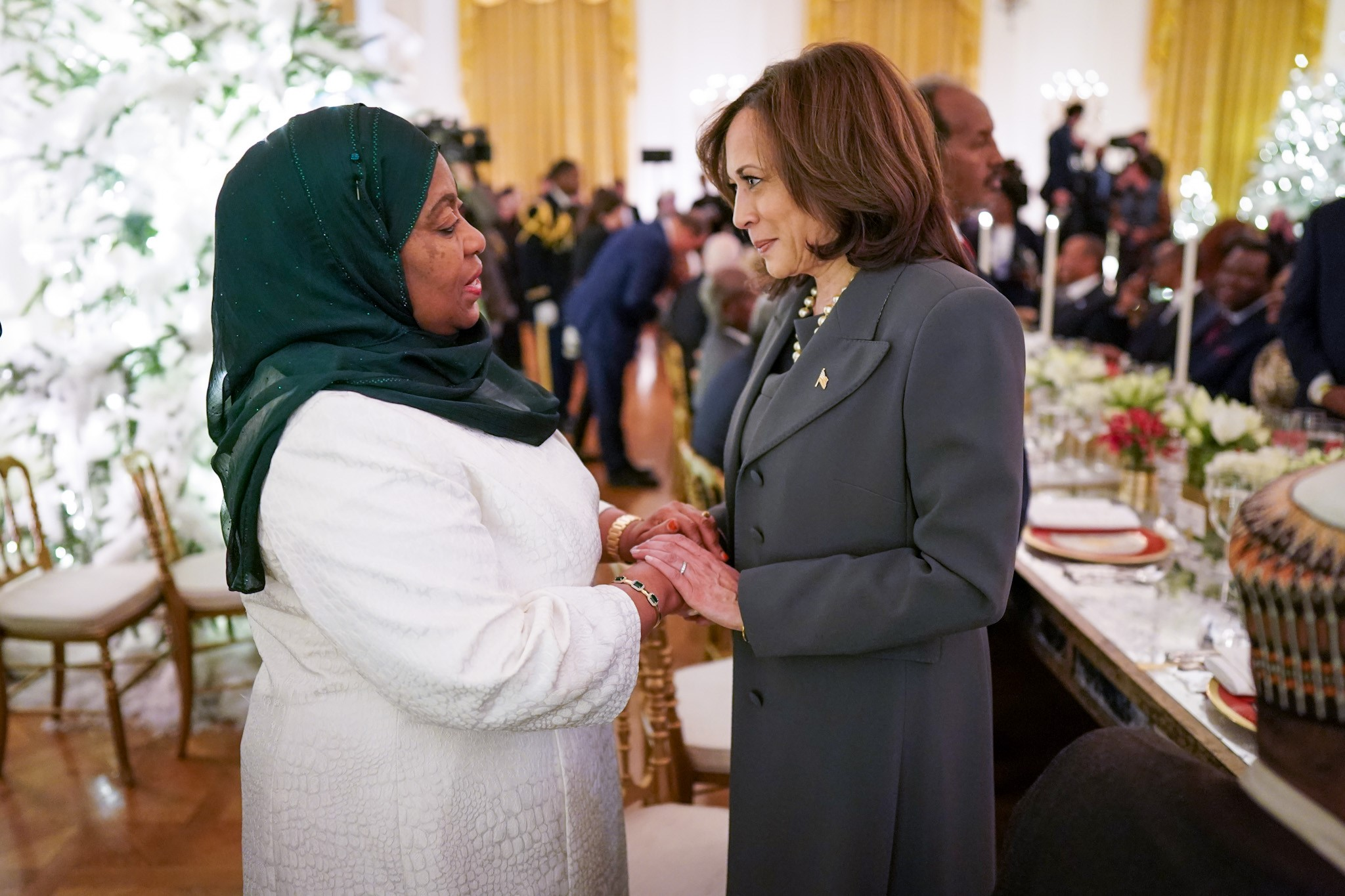
Samia Suluhu meeting with US Vice President Kamala Harris at the United States–Africa Leaders Summit 2022

== Summary of international trips ==
Map showing International trips made by Suluhu as President 1 Visit 2 Visits 3 Visits 4 Visits 5 or more Visits Tanzania

Number of Visits	Country
1 visit	Belgium, Brazil, Comoros, Democratic Republic of Congo, India, Indonesia, Morocco, Nigeria, Norway, Oman, Russia, Saudi Arabia, South Korea, Switzerland, Turkey, Vatican City
2 visits	Angola, Burundi, China, Egypt, France, Ghana, Malawi, Qatar, Senegal, United Kingdom, Zambia, Zimbabwe
3 visits	Ethiopia, Namibia, South Africa, United Arab Emirates
4 visits	Mozambique, Rwanda, Uganda, United States
5(+) visits	Kenya (5)

== 2021 ==
The following international trips were made by Samia Suluhu in 2021. She made 11 official trips to 10 different countries, totaling 28 days of official business travel outside the country.

Country	Areas visited	Date(s)	Purpose(s)	Notes
Uganda	Kampala	11 April	State Visit	See also: Tanzania–Uganda relations Samia Suluhu made her first state Visit to Uganda. She made a one-day state visit to meet Yoweri Museveni and the various stakeholders in the East African Crude Oil Pipeline. The Final Investment Decision agreement for the EACOP Tripartite project was signed.
Kenya	Nairobi	4–5 May	State Visit	See also: Kenya–Tanzania relations Samia Suluhu made her first visit to Kenya. The two day state visit was focused on improving trade relations between the two countries. She travelled with a delegation of the Tanzanian business community to help alleviate Non-Tariff barriers between the two countries. Suluhu also addressed the Kenyan parliament on 5 May, becoming the 3rd foreign head of state to address the Kenyan Parliament and the second Tanzanian president after Jakaya Kikwete.
Uganda	Kampala	12 May	Museveni Inauguration	See also: 2021 Ugandan general election Samia Suluhu made a day trip to Kampala to witness the Inauguration of Yoweri Museveni following his win in the 2021 Uganda general elections. The event was attended by 10 other African heads of states. She also held talks on the side line with Sahle-Work Zewde the president of Ethiopia.
Mozambique	Maputo	23–24 June	SADC Emergency Summit	See also: Insurgency in Cabo Delgado Samia Suluhu made her first to a SADC summit in a two-day visit to Maputo. The main focus of the summit was to discuss the regional response to support to Mozambique in addressing the increase in terrorism within its borders. Further topics discussed between the heads of state was regional food and nutrition security, gender and development, and progress in the regional response to HIV and AIDS.
Burundi	Bujumbura	16–17 July	State Visit	See also: Burundi–Tanzania relations Samia Suluhu made her first visit to Burundi as president in a two-day visit to Bujumbura. Suluhu focused her trip on increasing business co-operation between the two countries. She flagged off the Burundi Tanzania business forum and met with the Tanzanian diaspora living in Burundi. There were around eight cooperation agreements signed in the following sectors: mining, agriculture, fishing, energy, health and transfer of detainees. There was a further agreement signed between the two countries to exchange skills in teaching Swahili and French across borders.
Rwanda	Kigali	2–3 August	State Visit	See also: Rwanda–Tanzania relations Samia Suluhu made her first visit to Rwanda as president in a two-day visit to Kigali. Various bilateral agreements were signed in the following sectors: Immigration, Trade, ICT, and Defense. High on the agenda was to discuss the Insurgency in Cabo Delgado where both countries have an MoU with Mozambique. Rwanda's deployment of troops in Mozambique concerned the greater Southern African Development Community, and the meeting aimed to discuss how Rwanda can work with Tanzania one of the blocs core members in the region. While in Kigali Suluhu also visited various industries located in the Kigali Special Economic Zone.
Malawi	Lilongwe	17–18 August	41st Ordinary Summit of Southern African Development Community Heads of State and Government	Samia Suluhu made a two-day visit to Malawi to attend the 41st Ordinary Summit of SADC Heads of State and Government. The summit's theme was "Bolstering Productive Capacities in the Face of Covid-19 pandemic for Inclusive, Sustainable, Economic and Industrial Transformation". Lazarus Chakwera of Malawi assumed the position of chairman.
Zambia	Lusaka	24 August	Hichilema Inauguration	See also: 2021 Zambian general election Samia Suluhu made a day trip to Lusaka to witness the Inauguration of Hakainde Hichilema following his win in the 2021 Zambian general election.
United States	New York City	18–24 September	76th United Nations General Assembly	Samia Suluhu made her first trip outside of Africa while president. She attended the 76th UNGA summit in New York City. She addressed the General Assembly on September 23, 2021. The last time a Tanzanian president addressed the General assembly was Jakaya Kikwete at the 70th UNGA. The president also had various talks with various US government officials to strengthen bilateral ties.
United KingdomScotland	Glasgow	31 October – 4 November	2021 United Nations Climate Change Conference	Samia Suluhu attended the Climate Change Conference in Glasgow also known as COP26. She addressed the assembly on November 1 and throughout the conference met with various heads of states on the sidelines.
Egypt	Cairo	10–12 November	State Visit	See also: Egypt–Tanzania relations Samia Suluhu made an official state visit to Egypt for 3 days on invitation by Egypt president Abdel Fattah el-Sisi. Various trade and bilateral agreements were signed to help boost the relations between the two countries. Suluhu also requested further technical assistance from Egypt with the ongoing operations of the Julius Nyerere Hydropower Station that is being constructed by Egyptian contractors. She also met with ith the CEO of Elsewedy Electric to discuss their partnership in a $200m industrial park the company is looking to build in Kigamboni, Tanzania.

== 2022 ==
The following international trips were made by Samia Suluhu in 2022. She made 17 official trips to 15 different countries, totaling 58 days of official business travel outside the country.

Country	Areas visited	Date(s)	Purpose(s)	Notes
Mozambique	Pemba	28 January	State Visit	See also: Insurgency in Cabo Delgado Samia Suluhu made an impromtu day visit to Pemba Mozambique where she met her counterpart Filipe Nyusi. The details of the meeting was not made public, however, the talks most likely involved the two countries military involvement in the Insurgency in Cabo Delgado.
France	Paris, Brest	10–15 February	The One Planet Summit, For the Ocean 2022.	See also: France–Tanzania relations Samia made her inaugural trip into the European Union by attending the One Planet Summit in Brest France that was focused on developing the Blue economy. Post summit various Tanzanian ministers signed bilateral agreements with their French counterparts in trade and diplomacy. After the visit in Brest, Samia also held various bilateral meetings with various agencies in Paris. On February 13 Samia met the Tanzanian Diaspora residing in France. On February 14 the president met with the Director-General of the UNESCO Audrey Azoulay. She concluded her visit by meeting the French president Emmanuel Macron. Tanzania and France signed six agreements including funding for the Dar es Salaam bus rapid transit and the Tanzania Agricultural Development Bank.
Belgium	Brussels	16–18 February	6th European Union - African Union Summit	Samia visited Belgium after concluding her trip in France. Samia attended the 6th EU-AU summit where she lobbied to have EU sanctions on Burundi lifted. She met with EU president on the side lines. Tanzania received a grant of 425 million euros for various development projects. Before the summit she also held talks with Exiled Opposition Leader Tundu Lissu.
United Arab Emirates	Dubai	25–28 February	Tanzania Day at Expo 2020	Samia attended Expo 2020 in Dubai to inaugurate Tanzania Day. On the sidelines, Samia met with various high-level members from the UAE. Before the launch of the Tanzania pavilion at the expo, Samia met with the Crown Prince of Abu Dhabi and Deputy Commander-in-Chief of the United Arab Emirates (UAE) Sheikh Mohamed bin Zayed Al Nahyan, and, On February 26, Samia also met with the King of Dubai Sheikh Mohammed bin Rashid Al Maktoum. During the Expo, the president held various road shows for business opportunities in Tanzania and signed various agreements in Communication, Technology, Mining, and Tourism.
United States	Washington, D.C., New York City, Los Angeles	14–28 April	Launch of the documentary, "Tanzania: The Royal Tour"	Samia Suluhu arrived in the United States on April 14. She initially held bilateral talks with various United States counterparts and on April 15 held a joint press conference with US Vice President Kamala Harris. Per the vice president, the tour saw the signing of MOUs of almost $1 billion in investments from various US companies. Samia attended the World Premiere of the documentary "Tanzania: The Royal Tour" in New York on April 18 and the Los Angeles premiere on April 21. The documentary is a film she was part of to help promote Tanzanian tourism.
Uganda	Kampala	10–11 May	State Visit	See also: Tanzania–Uganda relations Samia Suluhu made a state visit to Uganda to help bolster bilateral relations between the two countries. The president also held bilateral talks with the president of Uganda Yoweri Museveni to help fast track bilateral infrastructure projects.
Ghana	Accra	23–25 May	State Visit	Samia Suluhu made her first visit to West Africa primary to attend an African Development Bank summit. She received the "Africa Road Builders–Babacar Ndiaye Trophy", an awarded administered by the African Development bank for her role in increased infrastructure development in Tanzania. The president also met with various Ghanaian officials to discuss trade expansion.
Oman	Muscat	12–14 June	State Visit	See also: Oman–Tanzania relations Samia Suluhu made a 3-day state visit to Oman where she was welcomed by her host the Sultan of Oman Haitham bin Tariq. She addressed various Omani business members to continue to invest in Tanzania. Various MOUs were signed in Agriculture, Oil & Gas and Trade.
Senegal	Dakar	6–7 July	IDA20 Summit	Samia Suluhu attended a high level meeting of the International Development Program (IDA20) hosted by the World Bank.
Democratic Republic of Congo	Kinshasa	17–18 August	42nd Heads of State summit, Southern African Development Community	Samia Suluhu attended the heads of state summit for Southern African Development Community leaders in DRC. The summit was the 30th anniversary of the formation of the organization.
Kenya	Nairobi	13 September	Inauguration of William Ruto, fifth President of Kenya	See also: 2022 Kenyan general election Samia Suluhu attended the inauguration of William Ruto.
United Kingdom	London	17–19 September	State funeral of Elizabeth II	Samia Suluhu attended the state funeral of Queen Elizabeth II along with various world heads of states.
Mozambique	Maputo	21–23 September	State Visit	See also: Mozambique–Tanzania relations Samia Suluhu conducted a 3 days state visit in Mozambique at the invitation of President Filipe Nyusi of Mozambique.
Qatar	Doha	4–6 October	World Innovation Summit for Health	Samia Suluhu attended the World Innovation Summit for health where she spoke during the opening ceremony. She also held bilateral talks with Qatari Amir, Tamim bin Hamad Al Thani.
China	Beijing	4–6 November	State Visit	See also: China–Tanzania relations Samia Suluhu made her maiden trip to China for a multi-date state visit per the invitation of Chinese President Xi Jinping. Both heads of states held bilateral talks and signed 15 agreements. The deals included various loan restructuring agreements and new infrastructure financing deals. Infrastructure deals such as upgrading the TAZARA Railway and the construction of Zanzibar International Airport's new terminal building.
Egypt	Sharm El Sheikh	6–9 November	2022 United Nations Climate Change Conference	Samia Suluhu attended the COP27 conference in Egypt. Samia led a 12 nation delegation to present a $18bn plan to increase renewal energy generation in solar, wind and hydro power in Southern Africa. Separately the heads of state of the East Africa Community held a private roundtable with Angola to discuss the situation of the M23 offensive in the DRC After the event, the president held bilateral talks with Egyptian president Abdel Fattah el-Sisi. The two discussed bilateral trade and the progress of the construction of the Julius Nyerere Hydropower Station.
United States	Washington, D.C.	13–15 December	United States–Africa Leaders Summit 2022	Samia Suluhu attended the US-Africa Summit 2022 hosted by US President Joe Biden. The summit was attended by 40+ African Heads of state. The president launched the new Tanzania Investment guide at the US Chamber of Commerce.

== 2023 ==
The following international trips were made by Samia Suluhu in 2023. She made 19 official trips to 18 different countries, totaling 39 days of official business travel outside the country.

Country	Areas visited	Date(s)	Purpose(s)	Notes
Switzerland	Davos	17–19 January	World Economic Forum Summit	Samia Suluhu made her first visit to the World Economic Forum summit in Davos.
Senegal	Dakar	25–26 January	Feed Africa Summit	Samia along with various African leaders attended the Feed Africa Dakar 2 Summit. Samia was a keynote speaker on Food, Sovereignty and Resilience. The summit hosted by the African Development Bank pledged to increase its investment in continental food production.
Burundi	Bujumbura	4 February	20th Extraordinary summit of EAC heads of state	See also: M23 offensive (2022–2023) Samia along with all other heads of states (minus Salva Kiir of South Sudan) from the East African Community attended an emergency summit hosted by EAC chair Évariste Ndayishimiye in Bujumbura. The summit was focused on the evaluation of the security situation in the Eastern Democratic Republic of Congo.
Ethiopia	Addis Ababa	16–19 February	36th ordinary Session of the African Union (AU) Assembly	Samia made her maiden visit to Ethiopia to attended the 36th Ordinary summit for the African Union. The summit focused on food security on the continent and Samia Alliance asked her counterparts to support Tanzania when they host the Green Revolution Forum in September. On the sidelines of the summit, Samia and all the other EAC leaders discussed their ongoing intervention in DRC.
South Africa	Pretoria	16–17 March	State Visit	See also: South Africa–Tanzania relations Samia Suluhu Hassan's first trip to South Africa as President of Tanzania. Hassan and her delegation met with South African President Cyril Ramaphosa. Both heads of state co-chaired the Second Session of the Bi-National Commission and signed various MOUs between the two countries.
Namibia	Windhoek	9–10 May	Extra-Ordinary Summit of SADC Members	See also: M23 offensive (2022–2023) An emergency summit was called of the SADC Organ Troika, Plus SADC Troika and Force Intervention Brigade Troop Contributing Countries Heads of State and Government of countries involved in the conflict in Eastern DRC. The heads met to co-ordinate their approach and communications in the intervention in Eastern DRC as multiple countries continue to pledge troops to assist in the conflict. After the summit, the president met with Tanzanian Diaspora in Namibia.
Uganda	Kikagati	26 May	State Visit	See also: Tanzania–Uganda relations Samia Suluhu along with President Yoweri Museveni of Uganda commissioned the 14-Megawatt Kikagate–Murongo Hydro power plant. The plan spans the Kagera River and the power is to be shared between the two countries.
Nigeria	Abuja	28–29 May	Inauguration of Bola Ahmed Tinubu	See also: 2023 Nigerian general election Samia attended the Inauguration and celebration of the new president of Nigeria Bola Tinubu.
Malawi	Lilongwe, Blantyre	5–7 July	State Visit	See also: Malawi–Tanzania relations Samia Suluhu made a three-day visit to Malawi. As part of the visit, Samia was a guest of honor at Malawi's 59th Independence day celebrations. The state visit included the signing of various bilateral agreements, including Tanzania's full support to help Malawi introduce Swahili language in schools. On July 5, president Samia was conferred with the Freedom of the Lilongwe City or the Key to the city.
South Africa	Johannesburg	24–25 August	15th BRICS summit	Samia Suluhu attended the BRICS summit as a guest along with several neighboring African leaders.
Kenya	Nairobi	5 September	Africa Climate Summit	Samia Suluhu made a day trip to attend the Africa Climate Summit.
Qatar	Doha	2–3 October	International Horticultural Expo 2023	Samia Suluhu attended the opening ceremony of the International Horticultural Expo 2023 held in Qatar.
India	New Delhi	9–11 October	State Visit	See also: India–Tanzania relations Samia Suluhu made a three-day visit to India. Samia first met with the External Affairs Minister of India S. Jaishankar where the two delegations held bilateral talks. After this, the president headed to the Rashtrapati Bhavan where she was officially received by the President of India Droupadi Murmu and Prime Minister of India Narendra Modi. Further talks were held between the two parties and new agreements were signed between the two countries in the sectors of Trade, Health and Infrastructure. On October 10 Samia began her day by attending a ceremony at Jawaharlal Nehru University where she received an honorary degree. In the evening the president was a chief guest at the India Tanzania Investment forum.
Zambia	Lusaka	23–25 October	State Visit	See also: Tanzania–Zambia relations Samia Suluhu conducted a three-day state visit to Zambia, where she participated in the country's 59th Independence Day celebrations as the chief guest, alongside Zambian President Hakainde Hichilema. The visit also included their presence at the Tanzania Zambia Business Forum. During the visit, both delegations engaged in bilateral talks and formalized their commitments through the signing of several Memoranda of Understanding (MoUs) including an agreement to export natural gas through the TAZAMA Pipeline. Samia Suluhu addressed the Zambian parliament, emphasizing the need for increased cooperation in joint infrastructure projects, such as the Tazama Pipeline, Tanzam Highway, TAZARA Railway, and the TAZA electricity interconnect, between the two countries. Samia also expressed the readiness of the government to upgrade the Kasesya-Nakonde border post along the T20 road. As part of a gesture, the Tanzanian government gifted the Zambian government 20 hectors of land at the Kwala Dry Port along with longer storage period of up to 45 days for Zambian bound cargo. Additionally, Samia expressed her intent to encourage the Tanzanian parliament to consider extending the visa-free entry for Zambian citizens from 90 days to 180 days, with the aim of promoting greater business cooperation between the two nations.
Rwanda	Kigali	1 November	23rd World Travel and Tourism Council Global Summit	Samia Suluhu attended the 23rd World Travel and Tourism Council Global Summit. She was a keynote speaker.
Angola	Luanda	4 November	SADC Extra-Ordinary Summit of the Heads of State and Government	Samia Suluhu made a day trip to Luanda to attend the SADC Summit where president Hakainde Hichilema was the chair.
Morocco	Marrakesh	8 November	AfDB Africa Investment Forum	Samia Suluhu spoke on a presidential panel at the African Development Bank hosted African Investment Forum.
Saudi Arabia	Riyadh	9–10 November	Saudi Arabia – Africa Summit	Samia Suluhu attended the first Saudi Arabia – Africa Summit held in Riyadh. The summit was attended by various African Heads of States.
United Arab Emirates	Dubai	30 November – 3 December	2023 United Nations Climate Change Conference	Samia Suluhu attended the 2023 United Nations Climate Change Conference, also known as COP28. On the sidelines of the conference she held talks with: Cindy McCain executive director of the World Food Programme; Abdel Fattah el-Sisi president of Egypt; Mia Mottley president of Barbados; Michael Bloomberg; The president spent a lot of her time being part of the pannel at African Women Clean Cooking Support Programme.

== 2024 ==
The following international trips were made by Samia Suluhu in 2024.

Country	Areas visited	Date(s)	Purpose(s)	Notes
Indonesia	Jakarta, Bogor	24–26 January	State Visit	See also: Indonesia-Tanzania relations Samia Suluhu made her first visit to the Southeast Asian country. She held bilateral meeting with President of Indonesia, Jokowi in Bogor State Palace, West Java. During the meeting, both leader signed five agreements in the fields of agriculture, minerals, bureau and maritime economy, diplomatic capacity, and investment promotion and facilitation.
Vatican City	Vatican City	12 February	Official Visit	See also: Catholic Church in Tanzania Samia Suluhu made an official visit to the Vatican to hold talks with Pope Francis. Following the meeting with the Pope, the President also held talks along with her delegation with Vatican Secretary of State, Cardinal Pietro Parolin, and Vatican Secretary for Relations with States and International Organizations, Archbishop Paul Gallagher.
Norway	Oslo	13–14 February	State Visit	Samia Suluhu made a state visit to Norway per the invitation of King Harald V. The visit aimed to improve bilateral relations between the two countries as the visit marked the 60th anniversary of the two countries establishing diplomatic relations. The visit is only the second state visit after Julius Nyerere visited Norway in 1976.
Ethiopia	Addis Ababa	17–18 February	37th ordinary Session of the African Union (AU) Assembly	Samia Suluhu attended the leaders summit at the African Union. Samia Suluhu and other regional leaders were present during the unveiling of a new statue of the former Tanzanian President the Late Julius Nyerere at the African Union.
Namibia	Windhoek	24–25 February	Funeral of Hage Geingob	Samia Suluhu attended the funeral ceremony of the late Namibian President Hage Geingob.
France	Paris	12–15 April	Clean Cooking Energy Summit	Samia Suluhu co-chaired the Summit on Clean Cooking, co-chaired by Tanzania and Norway, in Paris. The president also held bilateral talks with president Emmanuel Macron around the conference.
Turkey	Istanbul, Ankara	17–21 April	State Visit	See also: Tanzania–Turkey relations Samia Suluhu made a five day state visit to Turkey, the first visit by a Tanzanian president in 14 years. On April 18, the president received an honorary degree in economics from the Ankara University. She also met with Turkish president Recep Tayyip Erdoğan at the state house in Ankara where the president witnessed the signings of several bilateral agreements.
Kenya	Nairobi	29 April	International Development Association 21 - Africa Heads of State Summit	Samia Suluhu attended the International Development Association 21 (IDA21) - Africa Heads of State Summit. She was one of the speakers at the event.
South Korea	Seoul	31–6 June	State Visit and Africa-Korea Summit.	See also: South Korea–Tanzania relations During her visit, she attended the Africa-Korea Summit and conducted a state visit. Seven agreements were signed in areas such as mining, aviation, education, and the blue economy, and negotiations on an economic cooperation agreement began. Tanzania secured up to $2.5 billion in loans from the Exim Bank of Korea. President Samia also met with companies like Samsung and Hyundai and received an honorary doctorate from the Korea Aerospace Research Institute.
South Africa	Pretoria	19 June	Inauguration of Cyril Ramaphosa	See also: 2024 South African general election Samia attended the Inauguration of the reelection of President Cyril Ramaphosa along with other regional heads of state.
Rwanda	Kigali	11 August	Inauguration of Paul Kagame	See also: 2024 Rwandan general election Samia attended the Inauguration of the reelection of President Paul Kagame along with other regional heads of state.
Zimbabwe	Harare	15–17 August	44th Southern African Development Community Heads of State Summit	Samia Suluhu attended the 44th Heads of State summit for leaders of the Southern African Development Community along with other regional heads of state. She was appointed chairperson of the Troika on Politics, Defense and Security cooperation.
Kenya	Nairobi	27 August	AU Commission Visit	Samia Suluhu made a day trip to Kenya to support Raila Odinga bid for the African Union Chairmanship.
China	Beijing	3–6 September	Forum on China–Africa Cooperation 2024	Samia Suluhu along with various African Heads of State attended the Forum on China-Africa Cooperation hosted in China by President Xi Jinping. President Hassan welcomed the FOCAC Beijing Action Plan (2025-2027), which aims to address Africa's pressing needs and enhance modernization efforts. The president also held a ceremony with Zambian counterpart Hakainde Hichilema where they signed a memorandum on reviving the TAZARA Railway.
United States	Des Moines, Iowa	30–1 November	Norman E. Borlaug International Dialogue	Samia Suluhu attended the Norman E Borlaug International Dialogue meeting in Des Moines Iowa hosted by the World Food Prize Foundation.
Brazil	Rio De Janeiro	16–18 November	G20 Rio de Janeiro summit	Samia Suluhu attended the G20 Rio de Janeiro summit as invited guest. She also held bilateral meetings with several head state/governments including Indonesian President Prabowo Subianto.

== 2025 ==
The following international trips were made by Samia Suluhu in 2025.

Country	Areas visited	Date(s)	Purpose(s)	Notes
Zimbabwe	Harare	30–31 January	Southern African Development Community Summit	Samia Suluhu attended the SADC Troika on Politics, Defense and Security Cooperation. The summit had a focus on the ongoing M23 conflict in the Democratic Republic of Congo.
Ethiopia	Addis Ababa	14–16 February	38th African Union Summit	President Hassan lead the Tanzanian delegation to the 38th African Union Summit. A key event of the summit is the election of the new African Union Commission (AUC) chairperson, Djibouti's Mahmoud Ali Youssouf won the election.
Namibia	Windhoek	21 March	Inauguration of Nandi-Ndaitwah	See also: 2024 Namibian general election Samia attended the Inauguration of Namibia's first female president Netumbo Nandi-Ndaitwah.
Angola	Luanda	9–11 April	State visit	See also: Angola–Tanzania relations President Samia Hassan undertook a state visit to Angola, marking the first such visit by a Tanzanian Head of State in nearly two decades. During her visit, President Samia made history as the first female African leader to address the Angolan Parliament. The visit, held at the invitation of Angolan President João Lourenço, focused on strengthening bilateral relations and exploring strategic partnerships, particularly in the oil and gas sector. High-level talks were held, and several Memoranda of Understanding were signed to enhance cooperation in areas such as energy, mining, infrastructure, health, education, and tourism. President Samia also toured the Luanda Refinery, where she explored the facility's advanced technology and ongoing expansion projects, and discussed knowledge exchange and infrastructure investment with Angolan officials. The president also announced a policy granting visa-free entry to Angolan citizens traveling to Tanzania for tourism.
Mozambique	Maputo	24–25 June	Official Visit	President Samia Hassan attended the 50th Independence celebrations of Mozambique.
Comoros	Moroni	6 July	Official Visit	President Samia Hassan attended the 50th Independence celebrations of the Comoros Islands.

== 2026 ==
The following international trips were made by Samia Suluhu in 2026.

Country	Areas visited	Date(s)	Purpose(s)	Notes
United Arab Emirates	Dubai	2–5 February	World Governments Summit and Global Africa Investment Summit	President Samia Suluhu Hassan attended the 2026 World Governments Summit (WGS), themed "Shaping Future Governments", and the launch of the Global Africa Investment Summit (GAIS) in Dubai. The visit focused on economic diplomacy, attracting foreign investment, and bilateral discussions with UAE leaders and international investors.
Rwanda	Kigali	19 May	Nuclear Energy Innovation Summit for Africa	President Samia Suluhu Hassan travelled to Kigali to participate in the Nuclear Energy Innovation Summit for Africa 2026 (NEISA 2026). The summit brought together African leaders, policymakers, investors and energy stakeholders to discuss the role of nuclear energy in energy security, industrialisation and sustainable development.
Russia	Moscow, Saint Petersburg	3–5 June	State Visit	See also: Russia–Tanzania relations President Samia Suluhu Hassan attended the 29th St. Petersburg International Economic Forum (SPIEF), where she promoted investment opportunities in Tanzania. She also held bilateral talks with President Vladimir Putin on strengthening cooperation in trade, energy, transport, education and tourism.
Ghana	Accra	22 July	AU Special Summit on Health	Samia Suluhu made a working visit to Accra, Ghana, to attend the African Union Special Summit of Heads of State and Government on Health. During the summit, she called for increased domestic investment in healthcare systems and self-reliance across the continent. She also held bilateral talks with Ghanaian President John Dramani Mahama at Jubilee House to deepen cooperation in health, trade, and mining.
Zambia	Lusaka	1 September	Second inauguration of Hakainde Hichilema	See also: Tanzania–Zambia relations Samia Suluhu Hassan travelled to Zambia to attend the swearing-in ceremony of President Hakainde Hichilema, who was re-elected in the 13 August 2026 general election for a second five-year term.

== See also ==
- List of international presidential trips made by John Magufuli, her predecessor
