= List of international presidential trips made by John Magufuli =

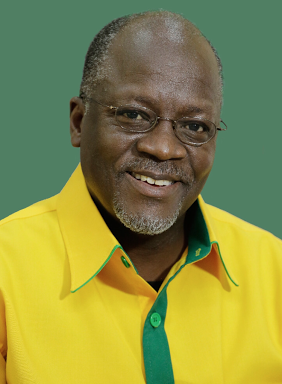
John Pombe Joseph Magufuli

John Magufuli became president of Tanzania on 5 November 2015 following the 2015 general election, until his death in 2021. After assuming office Magufuli asserted a strong stance against public spending, and discouraged foreign travel by senior government officials. He made his first foreign visit to Rwanda in April 2016, five months after assuming office. The following is a list of presidential trips made by John Magufuli while in office.

== Summary of international trips ==
Map showing International trips made by Magufuli as President 3 Visits 1 Visit Tanzania

| Number of Visits | Country |
|---|---|
| 1 visit | Ethiopia, Kenya, Malawi, Namibia, Rwanda, South Africa, Zimbabwe |
| 3 visits | Uganda |

== 2016 ==
The following international trips were made by John Magufuli in 2016

| Country | Areas visited | Date(s) | Purpose(s) | Notes |
|---|---|---|---|---|
| Rwanda | Rusumo, Kigali | 6 – 8 April | State Visit | See also: Rwanda–Tanzania relations Details Magufuli's first state visit was to Rwanda. On the first day Magufuli met his Rwandan counterpart Paul Kagame at the Rusumo Border for the inauguration of the new Rusumo International Bridge and the new One stop border post. Magufuli also attended the 22nd anniversary of the Rwandan genocide commemoration. Furthermore, both leaders will held bilateral talks to further help trade and East African Community integration. |
| Uganda | Kampala | 12 May | Yoweri Museveni inauguration | Further information: 2016 Ugandan general election Details Magufuli attended the inauguration of Yoweri Museveni at Kololo independence grounds along with various heads of state. Magufuli was scheduled to attend the 2016 Anti-corruption summit in London, but skipped the trip to attend the inauguration instead. Magufuli and Museveni also agreed to speed up the construction of the Uganda–Tanzania Crude Oil Pipeline. |
| Kenya | Nairobi | 31 October – 1 November | State Visit | See also: Kenya–Tanzania relations Details Magufuli Made a two-day state visit to Kenya to help improve bilateral relations between the countries. Magufuli address the Kenyan people at the statehouse and assures the Kenyan business community that Tanzania is open for business. Magufuli also officially opened the southern bypass in Nairobi and visited brookside dairy farm in Karen. |

== 2017 ==
The following international trips were made by John Magufuli in 2017

| Country | Areas visited | Date(s) | Purpose(s) | Notes |
|---|---|---|---|---|
| Ethiopia | Addis Ababa | 29 January – 2 February | 28th African Union Heads of State meeting | Details Magufuli makes his first foreign visit outside the East African Community to Addis for the 28th African Union Heads of State meeting. The president inaugurates the African Union facility named after Nyerere. Magufuli also holds bilateral talks with various heads of state: Paul Kagame of Rwanda; Peter Mutharika of Malawi; Yoweri Museveni of Uganda; Hailemariam Desalegn of Ethiopia; Azali Assoumani of Comoros and Nana Akufo-Addo of Ghana. |
| Uganda | Mutukula, Western Region, Kampala | 9 November - 11 November | State Visit | See also: Tanzania–Uganda relations Details Magufuli is joined by Yoweri Museveni at the Mutukula Border post to officially launch the One-Stop border between the two countries. The two presidents then travel to Ruzingwa Village where they placed the corner stone for the Uganda–Tanzania Crude Oil Pipeline. Both leaders signed various agreements together to boost trade, electrification and health care. |

== 2018 ==
The following international trips were made by John Magufuli in 2018

| Country | Areas visited | Date(s) | Purpose(s) | Notes |
|---|---|---|---|---|
| Uganda | Kampala | 21 February - 23 February | 19th EAC Ordinary summit | See also: Tanzania–Uganda relations Details Magufuli flew to Uganda to attend the East African Community heads of state summit. Magufuli also held sideline meetings with his Ugandan counter parts. Museveni and Magufuli discussed the East Africa Crude Oil Pipeline and sugar exports from Uganda into Tanzania. |

== 2019 ==
The following international trips were made by John Magufuli in 2019

| Country | Areas visited | Date(s) | Purpose(s) | Notes |
|---|---|---|---|---|
| Malawi | Lilongwe | 24 April - 25 April | State Visit | Details Magufuli and Malawi President Peter Mutharika held talks on strengthening their countries' relationship. |
| South Africa | Pretoria | 25 May - 26 May | Cyril Ramaphosa Inauguration | Details Magufuli joins various African leaders at the inauguration ceremony of Cyril Ramaphosa. Magufuli travels with his former counterpart Jakaya Kikwete to represent Tanzania at the ceremony. |
| Namibia | Windhoek | 27 May - 29 May | State Visit | Details Magufuli travels to Namibia after his trip to South Africa. Magufuli called for the immediate revival of a Joint Permanent Commission which encouraged trade between the two nations. The president also commissioned a street in the capital dedicated to Julius Nyerere, who was instrumental in helping Namibia attain its independence. |
| Zimbabwe | Harare | 29 May - 30 May | State Visit | Details Magufuli met with Emmerson Mnangagwa in Zimbabwe to conclude his Southern African trip. They discussed trade and economic opportunities and Tanzania offered to sell 700,000 tonnes of maize to drought hit Zimbabwe. |

== See also ==
- List of international presidential trips made by Jakaya Kikwete, his predecessor
- List of international presidential trips made by Samia Suluhu Hassan, his successor
