= France–Tanzania relations =

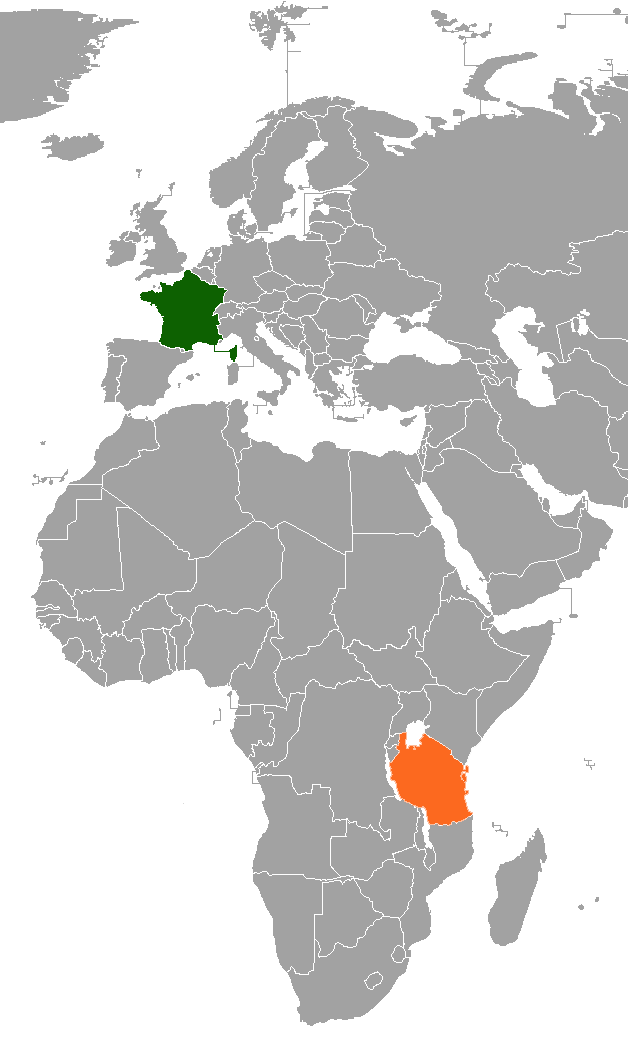
- France: Tanzania

France–Tanzania relations are bilateral relations between France and Tanzania.

== Trade ==
In 2020, the total bilateral trade between France and Tanzania was approximately 136 million euros. Most of the French exports are based on 4 major sectors: mechanical equipment, electrical, electronic and IT equipment; while imports from Tanzania are mainly forestry, fish and agro products. All imports from Tanzania to France are duty-free and quota-free, with the exception of armaments, as part of the Everything but Arms initiative of the European Union. In January 2020 the French-Tanzanian Chamber of Commerce was created with the top five major French companies operating in Tanzania: AGS Group, Bolloré, ENGIE PowerCorner, Maurel & Prom, TotalEnergies. Total Energies is the largest shareholder in the multi-billion dollar East African Crude Oil Pipeline project.

== Tourism ==
France is an important tourist market for tourism to Tanzania. In 2022, over 100,000 French citizens visited Tanzania, with a major focus on Zanzibar. Air France operates flights from Paris to Zanzibar and from June 2023, will operate direct flights from Paris to two cities in Tanzania.

== High level state visits ==
- January 2013, Jakaya Kikwete visits France to meet François Hollande on a state visit.
- February 2022, Samia Suluhu Hassan visits France to meet Emmanuel Macron on a state visit.

== Resident diplomatic missions ==
- France has an embassy in Dar es Salaam.
- Tanzania has an embassy in Paris.
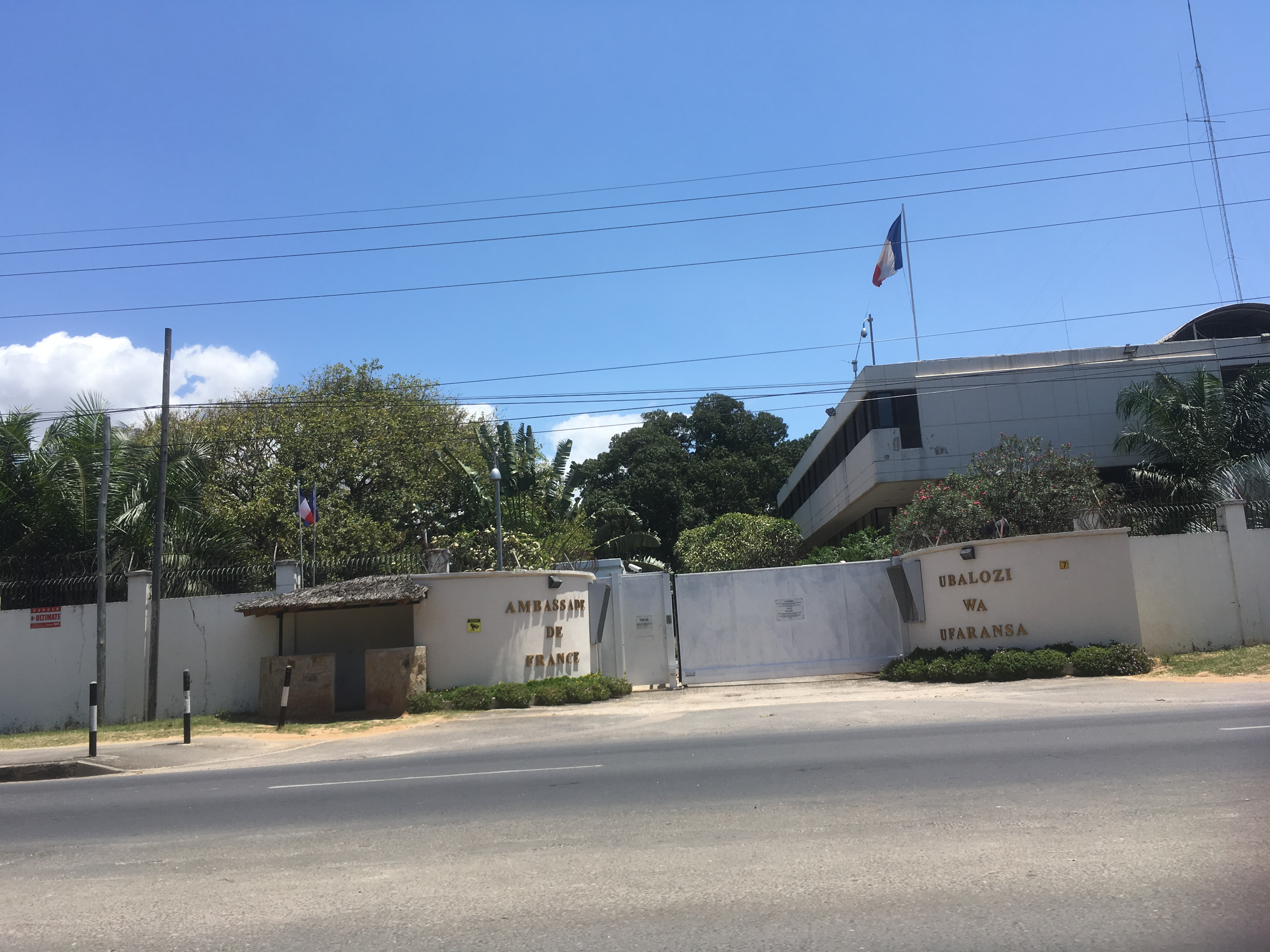
Embassy of France in Dar es Salaam

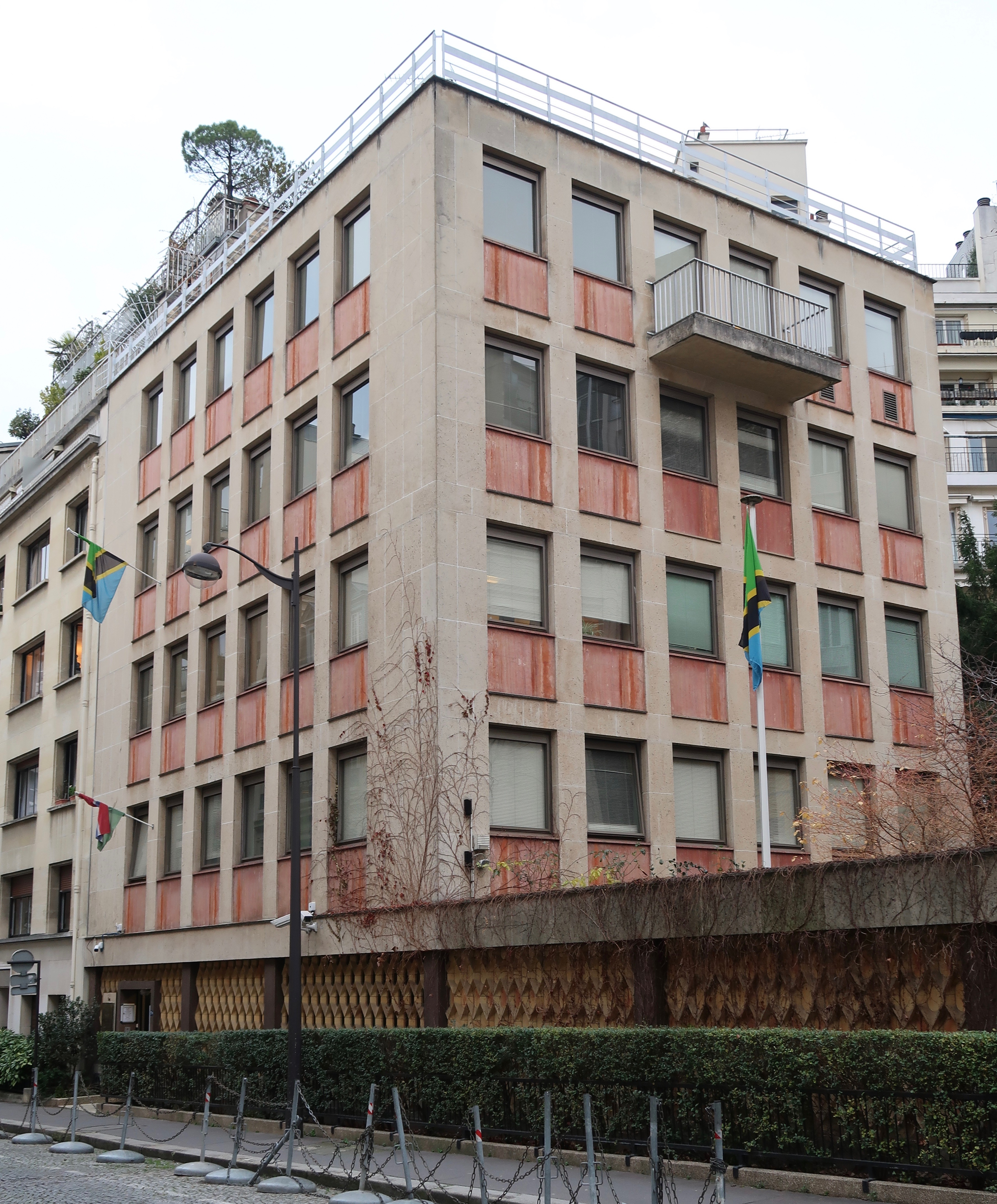
Embassy of Tanzania in Paris

== See also ==
- Foreign relations of France
- Foreign relations of Tanzania
- Hip-Hop Asili Festival
