= List of international presidential trips made by Jakaya Kikwete =

Jakaya Kikwete became President of Tanzania on 21 December 2005 following the 2005 Tanzanian general election. Kikwete was president for 10 years and ended his tenure on 5 November 2015, the following is a list of international presidential trips made by Jakaya Kikwete while in office.

== Summary of International Trips ==
Number of Visits	Country
1 visit	Angola, Democratic Republic if Congo, India, Malawi, Mozambique, South Africa, Vatican City
2 visits	Australia, Canada, United Kingdom
5(+) visits	United States (5)

== 2006 ==
Country	Location(s)	Date(s)	Notes
Angola	Luanda	20–23 August	State visit.
United States	New York City	23–25 September	Attended the Sixty-first session of the United Nations General Assembly.
South Korea	Seoul	November	Attended the South Korea - Africa Forum.

== 2007 ==
Country	Location(s)	Date(s)	Notes
Denmark	Copenhagen	1–2 March	Kikwete gave a speech at the Copenhagen University.
Vatican City	Vatican City	19 October	Held a private audience with Pope Pope Benedict XVI.

== 2008 ==
Country	Location(s)	Date(s)	Notes
United States	Washington, D.C.	26–29 August	State visit. Met with President George W. Bush at the White House.
United States	New York City	23–25 September	Attended the Sixty-third session of the United Nations General Assembly.

== 2009 ==
Country	Location(s)	Date(s)	Notes
Denmark	Copenhagen	5–7 May	Attended the Denmark–Africa Commission meeting.
South Africa	Pretoria	9 May	Attended the inauguration of Jacob Zuma.
United States	Washington, D.C.	21–24 May	State visit. Met with Rodney Bent acting CEO of Millennium Challenge Corporation.
Trinidad and Tobago	Port of Spain	28–30 November	2009 Commonwealth Heads of Government Meeting.

== 2010 ==
Country	Location(s)	Date(s)	Notes
Turkey	Ankara, Istanbul	17–21 February	State visit.

== 2011 ==
Country	Location(s)	Date(s)	Notes
Australia	Perth	28–30 October	Attended the 2011 Commonwealth Heads of Government Meeting.

== 2012 ==
Country	Location(s)	Date(s)	Notes
Oman	Muscat	15–18 October	State visit.

== 2013 ==
Country	Location(s)	Date(s)	Notes
France	Paris	20–24 January	State visit. Received an invitation by François Hollande.
Kuwait	Kuwait	5–6 May	State visit.
Malawi	Lilongwe	17–18 August	Attended the 33rd Heads of State and Government SADC Summit.
Canada	Guelph	20–23 September	Kikwete received his honorary degree from the University of Guelph.
United Kingdom	London	31–1 November	Attended the Open Government Partnership (OGP) Summit.
South Africa	Qunu	13–15 December	Attended the state funeral of Nelson Mandela.

== 2014 ==
Country	Location(s)	Date(s)	Notes
Democratic Republic of Congo	Kinshasa	23–24 May	Official visit. Met with Prime Minister Matata Ponyo Mapon.
Canada	Toronto	28–30 May	Attended the Global Summit on Maternal, Newborn and Child Health.
United Kingdom	London, Aberdeen	31–1 April	State visit, met with Prime Minister David Cameron and held bilateral talks on trade and investment, defence and governance and human rights. Kikwete also visited Scotland to explore the North Sea oil and gas industry.
United States	Washington, D.C.	5–6 August	Attended the first United States–Africa Leaders Summit.
China	Beijing, Shandong	23–30 October	State visit.

== 2015 ==
Country	Location(s)	Date(s)	Notes
United States	Washington, D.C.	3 April	Working visit. Spoke at the Woodrow Wilson International Center for Scholars.
India	New Delhi	17–21 June	State visit. Met with Pranab Mukherjee and Narendra Modi.
Australia	Canberra, Newcastle, Sydney	27–31 July	State visit.
Mozambique	Maputo, Pemba	10–11 October	State visit. Held talks with Filipe Nyusi.

== See also ==
- List of international presidential trips made by John Magufuli, his successor
