= Saudi Arabia–Tanzania relations =

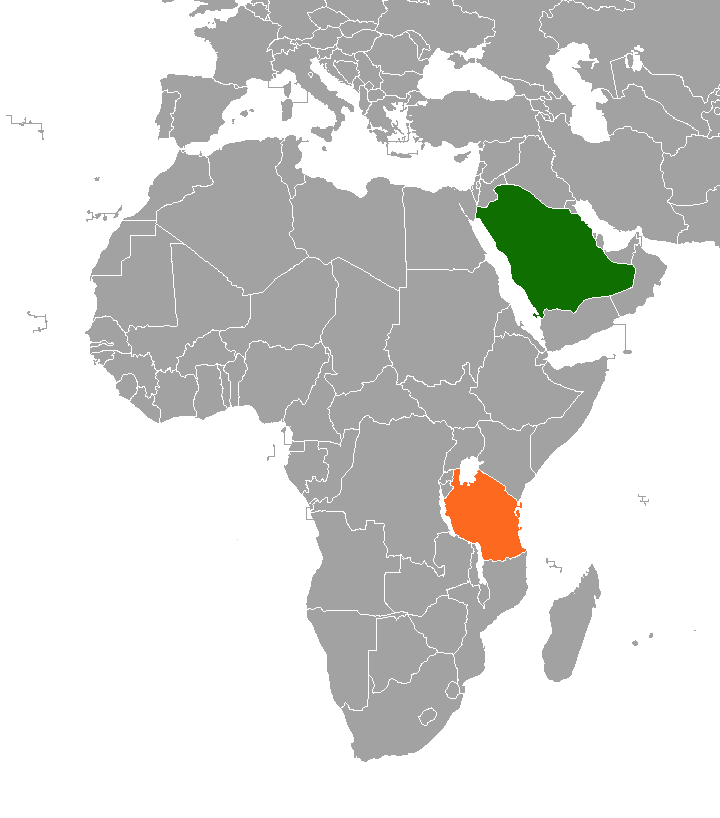
- Saudi Arabia: Tanzania

Saudi Arabia–Tanzania relations are bilateral relations between Tanzania and Saudi Arabia. Tanzania maintains an embassy in Riyadh and a consulate in Jeddah. Saudi Arabia has an embassy in Dar es Salaam.

== Trade and economy ==
The trade balance gap between Tanzania and Saudi Arabia is very large, heavily favored to Saudi Arabia. In 2013, Saudi Arabia exported $220 million worth of goods to Tanzania, mainly refined petroleum and polymer products. While in 2013, Tanzania only exported $20.7 million worth of goods to Saudi Arabia; mainly Tanzania's exports to Saudi Arabia are low value agriculture products such as vegetables, fish and raw tobacco.

== Wildlife Conservation ==
In 2014 after high level visits of Saudi officials to Tanzania, both countries agreed to work together in building skills in biodiversity conversation and wildlife protection. In 2014 various students from Saudi Arabia made a visit to the various national parks of the country to gain field experience in wildlife conservation. Saudi Arabia is extending this relationship to help the country rid its dependence on oil and tourism for its national income.

== Resident diplomatic missions ==
- Saudi Arabia has an embassy in Dar es Salaam.
- Tanzania has an embassy in Riyadh and a consulate-general in Jeddah.

== See also ==
- Foreign relations of Saudi Arabia
- Foreign relations of Tanzania
