= Brazil–Tanzania relations =

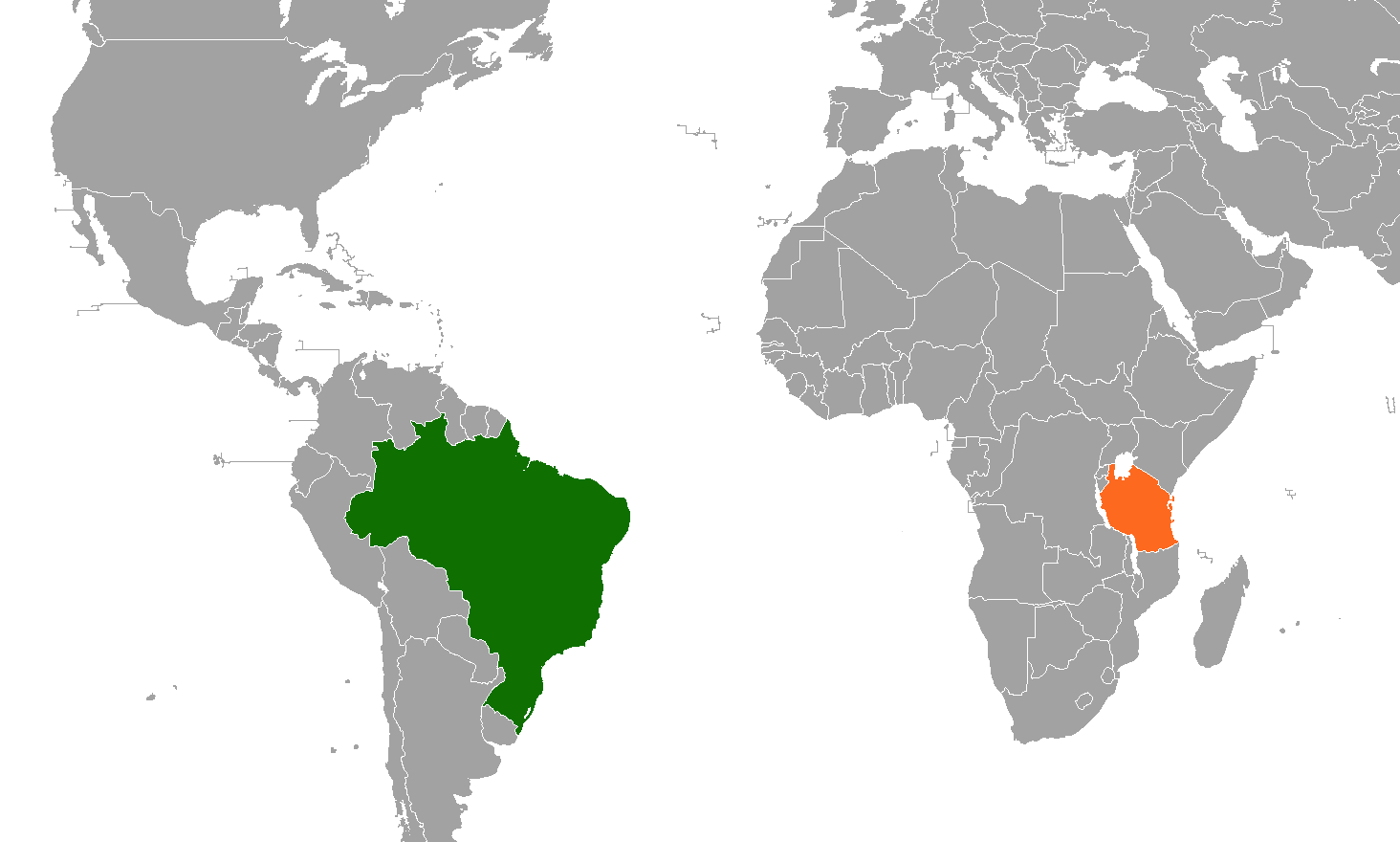
- Brazil: Tanzania

Brazil–Tanzania relations refers to the bilateral relations between Brazil and Tanzania. Both nations are members of the Group of 77 and the United Nations.

== History ==
Brazil and Tanzania established diplomatic relations in 1970. In 1979, Brazil opened an embassy in Dar es Salaam; however, the embassy was closed in 1991 due to budget restraints. In March 2005, the Brazilian embassy in Dar es Salaam was reopened. In 2007, Tanzania opened a resident embassy in Brasília.

In July 2010, President Luiz Inácio Lula da Silva became the first Brazilian head-of-state to visit Tanzania which constituted a historic landmark in the relations between the two countries. During the visit, bilateral contacts were deepened in areas such as biofuels, agriculture, investments in infrastructure, mining and trade.

Following the Brazilian Presidential visit, Tanzanian Foreign Minister, Bernard Membe paid a visit to Brazil in September 2010. In 2011, Tanzanian Prime Minister, Mizengo Pinda, paid an official visit to Brazil. In 2012, Tanzanian President, Jakaya Kikwete, also paid a visit to Brazil.

Brazil's cooperation with Tanzania includes initiatives in several areas. Both at the trilateral and bilateral levels, initiatives were developed in the agricultural, health, energy, sports and child protection sectors. Currently, trilateral programs are being implemented in the area of food security (school meals) and promotion of decent work in the cotton sector, as well as bilateral programs to strengthen the cotton and fishing sectors in Tanzania.

== High-level visits ==
High-level visits from Brazil to Tanzania

- President Luiz Inácio Lula da Silva (2010)

High-level visits from Tanzania to Brazil

- Foreign Minister Bernard Membe (2010)
- Prime Minister Mizengo Pinda (2011)
- President Jakaya Kikwete (2012)

== Bilateral agreements ==
In August 2008, both nations signed several agreements such as an Agreement of a Cooperation in the Area of Sports; an Educational Cooperation Agreement; a Visa Exemption Agreement for Holders of Diplomatic, Official or Service Passports; and an Agreement on the Exercise of Remunerated Activity by Dependents of Diplomatic, Consular, Military, Administrative and Technical Staff. In 2010 a Memorandum of understanding for cooperation in combating deforestation and for training diplomats was signed. In 2018 a Memorandum of Understanding on Political Consultations was also signed between both nations.

== Resident diplomatic missions ==
- Brazil has an embassy in Dar es Salaam.
- Tanzania has an embassy in Brasília.

== See also ==
- Foreign relations of Brazil
- Foreign relations of Tanzania
