= Egypt–Tanzania relations =

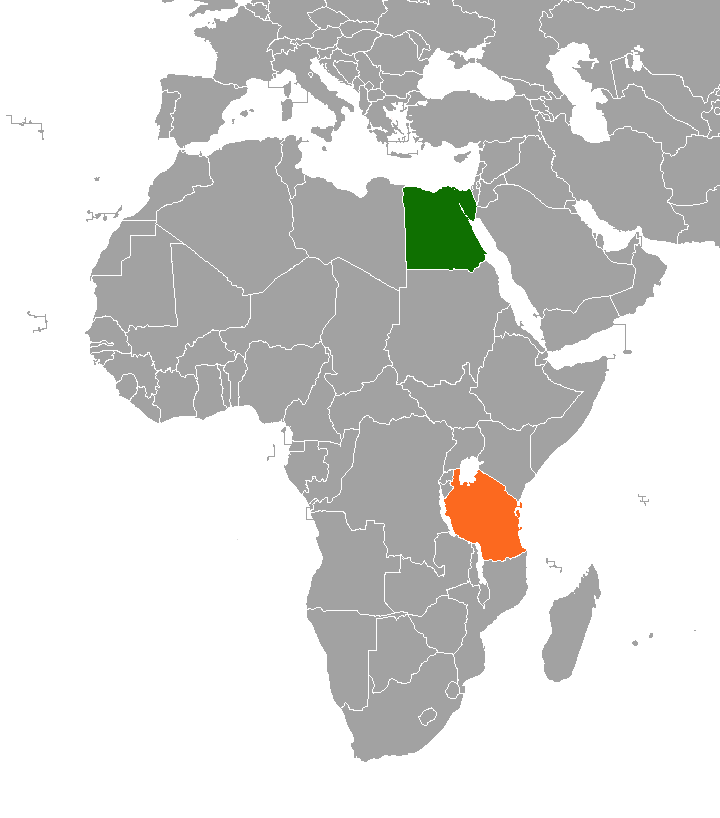
- Egypt: Tanzania

Egypt–Tanzania relations are the bilateral relations between Egypt and Tanzania. The two states established formal diplomatic relations in 1964 following the union of Tanganyika and Zanzibar, and they maintain ties across political, economic, and technical domains. Both countries are members of the Non-Aligned Movement, the African Union, and the Group of 77. Egypt maintains an embassy in Dar es Salaam, while Tanzania maintains an embassy in Cairo.

== History ==
Formal diplomatic relations began in 1964 after the union of Tanganyika and Zanzibar, with early ties shaped by cooperation between Presidents Gamal Abdel Nasser and Julius Nyerere. Notable high-level contacts include President Nasser’s 1966 visit to Tanzania, as well as renewed presidential-level engagement since 2017 and 2021 reflecting continuity in political dialogue.

== Trade ==
Bilateral trade has historically been modest but diversified; official material notes foodstuffs, chemicals, metals, manufactured goods and paper among Egyptian exports, and wood, raw leather, tea and chemical products among imports, alongside cooperation in construction, infrastructure, water and capacity building. Public statements by both sides emphasize expanding trade, investment and technical cooperation, with Egyptian firms active in Tanzanian infrastructure and energy projects under government-to-government frameworks.

== High-level visits ==
=== Presidential ===
- 22–28 September 1966 – President Gamal Abdel Nasser pays a state visit to Tanzania and Zanzibar.
- July 1999 – President Benjamin Mkapa visits Egypt for economic and political consultations.
- 21 January 2003 – President Benjamin Mkapa pays a further working visit to Egypt.
- 17 August 2017 – President Abdel Fattah el-Sisi conducts an official visit to Tanzania, reviving presidential-level exchanges.
- 10–12 November 2021 – President Samia Suluhu Hassan pays an official visit to Egypt to enhance bilateral cooperation.

== Diplomatic missions ==
Egypt maintains an embassy in Dar es Salaam, and Tanzania maintains an embassy in Cairo. Former Tanzanian ambassadors to Egypt include Salim Ahmed Salim, who served as the first ambassador in 1964 after the union of Tanganyika and Zanzibar.

== See also ==
- Foreign relations of Egypt
- Foreign relations of Tanzania
- Group of 77
- Non-Aligned Movement
- African Free Trade Zone
