= Angola–Tanzania relations =

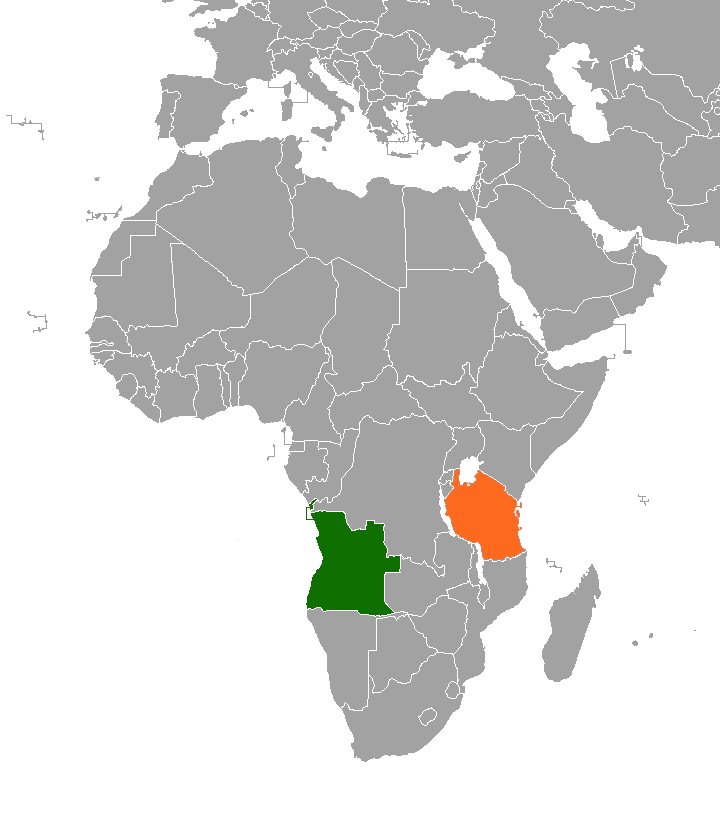
- Angola: Tanzania

Angola–Tanzania relations are the bilateral relations between Angola and Tanzania. The two nations primarily maintain trade ties and established formal diplomatic relations on 25 August 1981. Both countries are members of the Southern African Development Community, Non-Aligned Movement, Group of 77 and the African Union. Angola has an embassy in Dar es Salaam, while Tanzania maintains relations through its embassy in Lusaka, Zambia.

== History ==
As with other Southern African Liberation movements, in the mid-1960s, Tanzania and Zambia played a crucial role in supporting the Angolan independence party, the MPLA's efforts in Angola. The MPLA's improved political and military strategies, which gained international attention, were significantly bolstered by the assistance of these two countries. Both Tanzania and Zambia allowed the MPLA to open offices in their capitals and facilitated the transport of Chinese and Soviet weapons to the Angolan border. This support enabled the MPLA to launch a major offensive in eastern Angola by 1966, making it a more formidable opponent to Portugal's colonial rule than the FNLA.

The growing success of the MPLA during this time was largely due to the aid provided by Tanzania and Zambia. With the MPLA's accession to power, the country's new leader Agostinho Neto held good relations with Tanzania and Tanzanian President Julius Nyerere.

Angola sent its first ambassador Eusébio Sebastião Júnior, to Tanzania and officially established diplomatic relations with Tanzania on 25 August 1981.

== High level visits ==
- 29 October 1978, Agostinho Neto, arrived in Dar es Salaam to discuss with other regional leaders the continued situation in Rhodesia and South West Africa.
- 22 August 2006, Jakaya Kikwete made a state visit to Angola
- 8 April 2025, Samia Suluhu Hassan made a state visit to Angola.

== Diplomatic missions ==
- Angola has an embassy in Dar es salaam
- Tanzania maintains its diplomatic relations in Angola through its high commission in Zambia.

=== Ambassadors of Angola to Tanzania ===
On November 16, 1979, the first Ambassador Eusébio Sebastião Júnior, presented the Credentials to the President of the United Republic of Tanzania, Julius Nyerere.

- Eusebio Sebastian Junior (1979–1990)
- Jose Agostinho Neto(1992–2000)
- Brito Antonio Alone (2000–2006)
- Ambrosio Lukoki (2008–2018)
- Sandro Renato Agostinho De Oliveira (July 2019–Present)

== See also ==
- Foreign relations of Angola
- Foreign relations of Tanzania
- African Free Trade Zone
