= Ugandans in Tanzania =

- (Uganda) (Tanzania)

Total population
- 4,695

Regions with significant populations
- Dar es Salaam, Mwanza, Bukoba, Kagera Region, and areas around Lake Victoria

Languages
- Swahili, English, Luganda, and other Ugandan languages

Religion
- Predominantly Christianity (Catholic and Anglican), and also traditional beliefs

Ugandands in Tanzania refer to individuals residing in Tanzania who were either born in Uganda or have at least one parent of Ugandan nationality. They constitute a small but established regional migrant community within East Africa. Their presence is primarily shaped by historical trade networks, labour migration, and the free movement framework of the East African Community (EAC), which facilitates cross-border movement between member states. The two countries share a land border of approximately 396 kilometres (246 mi), further contributing to regular cross-border interaction.

== History ==
=== Pre-colonial period ===
Prior to European colonisation, the region corresponding to present-day Uganda and northern Tanzania formed part of a broader interconnected cultural and economic zone within the African Great Lakes region. This area was characterised by fluid boundaries, with movement shaped by trade, kinship networks, and historical processes associated with the historical expansion and interaction of Bantu-speaking populations.

Polities such as the Kingdom of Buganda and various interlacustrine societies in the Lake Victoria basin maintained extensive regional interactions. These included trade in goods such as iron, livestock, and agricultural products, as well as movement of artisans, traders, and pastoralist groups across what are today international borders. In this period, social and political organisation was based on kingdoms, clans, and linguistic communities rather than fixed territorial borders, resulting in continuous demographic and cultural exchange across the region. Canoe-based transport across the lake and overland caravan routes, particularly through Unyamwezi in current central Tanzania, connected inland production zones with wider regional trade systems.

This pre-colonial pattern of fluid mobility and regional interaction was significantly altered following the arrival of European powers in the African Great Lakes region, when the area was incorporated into distinct colonial administrations. While earlier movements were structured by interconnected cultural, linguistic, and economic networks across the region, colonial rule introduced formal territorial borders and centralized administrative systems that reshaped patterns of migration, labour allocation, and long-distance movement.

=== Colonial period ===
Uganda was incorporated into the British Empire as the Uganda Protectorate in 1894. British colonial administration relied heavily on indirect rule, working through existing kingdoms such as Buganda, and integrating the territory into broader imperial economic systems. Colonial infrastructure projects, including railway development and cash-crop agriculture, facilitated labour mobility both within Uganda and across adjacent regions.

Tanganyika, by contrast, was initially colonised by the German colonial empire as part of German East Africa in the late 19th century. Following Germany's defeat in the First World War, the territory was placed under British administration as a League of Nations mandate. Under both German and later British rule, Tanganyika was incorporated into colonial economic systems focused on plantations, transport corridors, and export-oriented production.

Despite being governed under different colonial powers for part of this period, both territories became integrated into wider East African colonial labour and trade networks. The development of transport infrastructure and colonial labour demands contributed to increased movement of workers, traders, and migrants between the territories, particularly around the Lake Victoria basin and emerging urban centres.

=== Post-independence migration dynamics ===
Following independence in the early 1960s, migration patterns between Uganda and Tanzania were reshaped by divergent political trajectories. Tanzania, under the leadership of Julius Nyerere, adopted a policy framework influenced by African socialism (Ujamaa) and regional Pan-African cooperation, which contributed to relatively open cross-border mobility within East Africa.

Uganda, by contrast, experienced increasing political instability after independence in 1962, particularly during the regime of Idi Amin (1971–1979). Periods of repression, economic decline, and conflict generated significant outflows of Ugandan nationals to neighbouring countries, including Tanzania. These movements included both voluntary labour migration and forced displacement, with Tanzania becoming one of the principal destinations for Ugandan refugees during periods of crisis.

As a result, post-independence migration across the Uganda–Tanzania border shifted from pre-colonial and colonial patterns of trade-based mobility to politically driven flows shaped by state formation, conflict, and regional asylum dynamics.

Cross-border interaction between Uganda and Tanzania is also facilitated by ferry transport across Lake Victoria. Passenger and cargo ferries have historically connected ports such as Port Bell and Entebbe in Uganda with Mwanza and Bukoba in Tanzania, forming part of a regional transport network linking communities around the lake. These services transport passengers, vehicles, and goods, and have long supported trade and population movement between the two countries. Although many ferry routes now operate primarily within national waters, cross-lake connections continue to play a role in regional mobility and economic exchange.

== Diaspora engagement ==
In May 2025, Ugandan authorities convened the first Uganda Diaspora Convention in Tanzania, organised by the Uganda High Commission in Dar es Salaam in collaboration with diaspora associations. The meeting brought together Ugandan nationals residing in Tanzania and government representatives to promote investment, dialogue, and socio-economic cooperation, illustrating state engagement with expatriate communities consistent with diaspora politics strategies.

== See also ==
- Tanzania–Uganda relations
- Tanzanians in Uganda
