= Tanzania–United Arab Emirates relations =

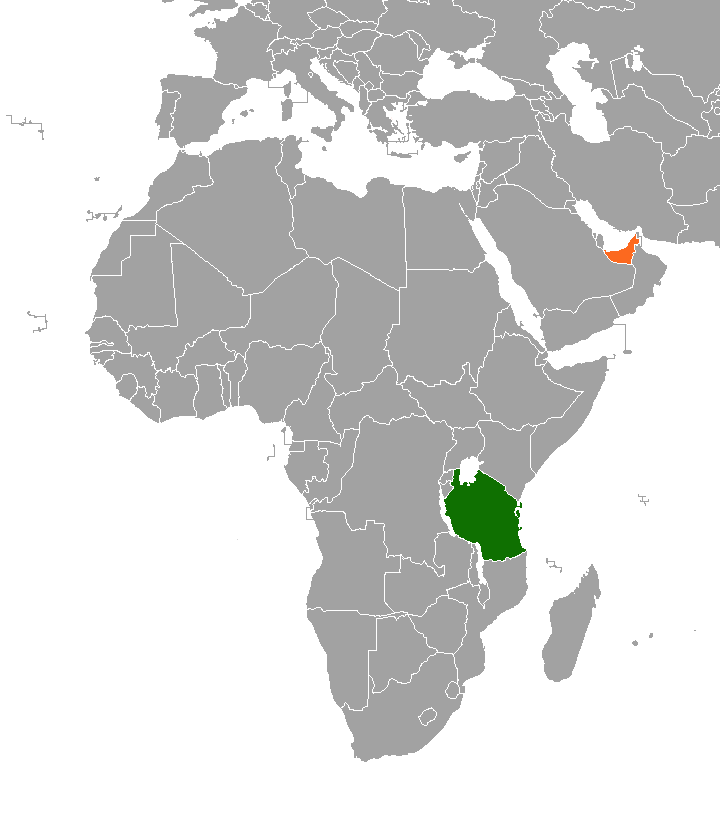

- Tanzania: United Arab Emirates

Tanzania–United Arab Emirates relations are the diplomatic relations between Tanzania and the United Arab Emirates. The UAE is one of Tanzania's largest trading partner and have had cordial relationship for many years.

== Trade ==
The Trade balance between the UAE and Tanzania stands at around $2 billion annually, in the UAE's favor. UAE is Tanzania's number three importer and mainly imports refined petroleum products. In 2013 Tanzania imported $1.14 billion worth of goods from the UAE with 53% of that being refined petroleum products; while in 2013 the UAE imported $85 million worth of goods from Tanzania, mainly agriculture products. The UAE is the largest buyer of cloves from Tanzania.

== Transport links ==
Currently 3 Emirati airlines fly to Tanzania regularly, namely Emirates and Flydubai from Dubai and Etihad from Abu Dhabi. These air links are vital for the Tanzania economy as they facilitate business and bring in Tourists.

== Diplomatic mission ==
Tanzania maintains an embassy in Abu Dhabi and a consulate general in Dubai.

The UAE also maintains an embassy in Dar es Salaam and a consulate general in Zanzibar.

== See also ==
- Foreign relations of Tanzania
- Foreign relations of the United Arab Emirates
