= Foreign relations of Tanzania =

Tanzania's first president, Julius Nyerere also was one of the founding members of the Non-Aligned Movement, and, during the Cold War era, Tanzania played an important role in regional and international organisations, such as the Non-Aligned Movement, the front-line states, the G-77, and the Organisation of African Unity (OAU) (now the African Union). One of Africa's best-known elder statesmen, Nyerere was personally active in many of these organisations, and served chairman of the OAU (1984–85) and chairman of six front-line states concerned with eliminating apartheid in Southern Africa. Nyerere was also involved with peace negotiations in Burundi until his death. Nyerere's death, on 14 October 1999, is still commemorated annually.

Tanzania, officially known as the United Republic of Tanzania, enjoys good relations with its neighbours in the region and in recent years has been an active participant in efforts to promote the peaceful resolution of disputes. Tanzania is helping to broker peace talks to end conflict in Burundi and supports the Lusaka agreement concerning the conflict in the Democratic Republic of the Congo. In March 1996, Tanzania, Uganda, and Kenya revived discussion of economic and regional cooperation. These talks culminated with the signing of an East African Cooperation Treaty in September 1999, which should in time lead to economic integration through the development of the East African Community. Tanzania is the only country in East Africa which also is a member of the Southern African Development Community (SADC).

Historically, Tanzania has played an active role in hosting refugees from neighbouring countries including Mozambique, DR Congo, Burundi, and Rwanda. This normally has been done in partnership with the United Nations High Commissioner for Refugees.

== Diplomatic relations ==
List of countries which Tanzania maintains diplomatic relations with:

#	Country	Date
1	Nigeria	9 December 1961
2	Canada	9 December 1961
3	China	9 December 1961
4	Germany	9 December 1961
5	India	9 December 1961
6	Italy	9 December 1961
7	Japan	9 December 1961
8	Serbia	9 December 1961
9	United Kingdom	9 December 1961
10	United States	9 December 1961
11	Russia	10 December 1961
12	Czech Republic	12 December 1961
13	Philippines	15 December 1961
14	Israel	20 December 1961
15	France	22 December 1961
16	Ghana	4 January 1962
17	Poland	14 January 1962
18	Netherlands	2 March 1962
19	Cuba	6 May 1962
20	Australia	12 May 1962
21	Bulgaria	16 June 1962
22	Belgium	21 August 1962
23	Egypt	14 November 1962
24	Hungary	23 November 1962
25	Turkey	5 July 1963
26	Somalia	16 October 1963
27	Burundi	1963
28	Sudan	1963
29	Indonesia	25 January 1964
30	Algeria	21 February 1964
31	Switzerland	26 April 1964
32	Romania	5 May 1964
33	Sweden	29 May 1964
34	Democratic Republic of the Congo	30 May 1964
35	Ethiopia	1 June 1964
36	Ivory Coast	2 July 1964
37	Norway	28 September 1964
38	Mali	24 November 1964
39	Denmark	8 December 1964
40	Rwanda	7 January 1965
41	Zambia	7 January 1965
42	North Korea	13 January 1965
43	Vietnam	14 February 1965
44	Finland	14 June 1965
45	Morocco	8 October 1965
46	Liberia	27 May 1966
47	Albania	May 1966
48	Austria	31 August 1966
49	Syria	13 September 1966
50	Guinea	22 December 1966
51	Mongolia	17 January 1967
52	Pakistan	20 February 1967
53	Spain	23 February 1967
—	Holy See	28 April 1968
54	Tunisia	2 December 1968
55	Senegal	22 August 1969
56	Brazil	5 January 1970
57	Lesotho	23 January 1970
58	Trinidad and Tobago	2 July 1970
59	Guyana	28 December 1970
60	Barbados	8 March 1971
61	Jamaica	6 April 1971
62	Chile	12 June 1971
63	Sierra Leone	3 November 1971
64	Botswana	29 November 1971
65	Greece	29 November 1971
66	Yemen	April 1972
67	Cameroon	August 1972
68	United Arab Emirates	8 January 1973
69	Kuwait	19 January 1973
70	Mexico	19 February 1973
71	Iraq	15 April 1973
72	Madagascar	28 June 1973
73	Sri Lanka	July 1973
74	Eswatini	20 February 1974
75	Argentina	7 March 1974
76	Nepal	10 January 1975
77	Portugal	1 April 1975
78	Libya	15 April 1975
79	Mozambique	25 June 1975
80	Peru	12 August 1975
81	Comoros	1976
82	Iceland	17 November 1977
83	Cyprus	24 February 1978
84	Laos	15 May 1978
85	Suriname	30 June 1978
86	Bahrain	1978
87	Benin	25 May 1979
88	Ireland	3 December 1979
89	Cape Verde	11 March 1980
90	Papua New Guinea	29 March 1980
91	Zimbabwe	30 April 1980
92	Djibouti	3 December 1980
93	Singapore	12 December 1980
94	Luxembourg	14 December 1980
95	Thailand	30 December 1980
96	Nicaragua	December 1980
97	Oman	9 January 1981
98	Angola	25 August 1981
99	Republic of the Congo	22 October 1981
100	Colombia	28 October 1981
101	New Zealand	7 December 1981
102	Venezuela	11 December 1981
103	Uganda	15 December 1981
104	Malaysia	29 September 1982
105	Iran	13 October 1982
106	Qatar	13 December 1982
107	Bangladesh	10 November 1983
108	Kenya	13 December 1983
109	Saudi Arabia	11 April 1984
110	Togo	27 December 1984
111	Guinea-Bissau	1984
112	Malawi	16 May 1985
113	Seychelles	11 November 1986
114	Vanuatu	18 December 1986
115	Uruguay	1 April 1987
116	Maldives	11 August 1988
117	Namibia	21 March 1990
—	State of Palestine	1990
118	Armenia	22 April 1992
119	South Korea	30 April 1992
120	Ukraine	8 July 1992
121	Slovakia	1 January 1993
122	Slovenia	4 June 1993
123	Croatia	2 July 1993
124	Lithuania	11 November 1993
125	South Africa	18 July 1994
126	Cambodia	8 March 1995
127	Belarus	23 May 1996
128	Estonia	24 July 1996
129	North Macedonia	22 January 1997
130	Latvia	28 November 1997
131	Brunei	6 October 2000
132	Mauritius	22 May 2007
133	Eritrea	13 July 2007
—	Kosovo	2 April 2014
134	Jordan	3 June 2015
135	Malta	11 June 2015
136	Ecuador	16 June 2015
137	Mauritania	1 September 2015
138	South Sudan	13 April 2016
139	Fiji	26 May 2016
140	Niger	23 March 2017
141	Georgia	20 October 2018
142	Bosnia and Herzegovina	25 January 2019
143	Azerbaijan	7 February 2019
144	Kazakhstan	13 February 2019
145	Gambia	25 April 2019
146	Central African Republic	8 November 2019
147	Burkina Faso	25 August 2021
148	Equatorial Guinea	28 March 2025
149	Kyrgyzstan	26 September 2025
150	Lebanon	5 May 2026
151	Gabon	6 July 2026
—	Sahrawi Arab Democratic Republic	Unknown

== Bilateral relations ==
=== Africa ===
Country	Formal Relations Began	Notes
Burundi	1963	See Burundi–Tanzania relations Both countries established diplomatic relations in 1963 when has been appointed first Ambassador of Burundi to Tanzania Mr Joseph Mahenehene.
Kenya	13 December 1983	See Kenya–Tanzania relations Both countries established diplomatic relations on 13 December 1983
Malawi	16 May 1985	See Malawi–Tanzania relations Both countries established diplomatic relations on 16 May 1985
Mozambique	25 June 1975	See Mozambique–Tanzania relations Both countries established diplomatic relations on 25 June 1975
Rwanda	7 January 1965	See Rwanda–Tanzania relations Both countries established diplomatic relations on 7 January 1965 when accredited first Ambassador of Rwanda to Tanzania (resident in Kampala) Mr. Musabyimana Malachie
Uganda	13 December 1983	See Tanzania–Uganda relations

=== Americas ===
Country	Formal Relations Began	Notes
Brazil	5 January 1970	See Brazil–Tanzania relations Both countries established diplomatic relations on 5 January 1970
Mexico	19 February 1973	See Mexico–Tanzania relations Both countries established diplomatic elations on 19 February 1973
United States	9 December 1961	See Tanzania–United States relations Both countries established diplomatic relations on 9 December 1961 The U.S. Government provides assistance to Tanzania to support programs in the areas of health, environment, democracy, and development of the private sector. The U.S. Agency for International Development's program in Tanzania averages about $20 million per year. The Peace Corps program, revitalised in 1979, provides assistance in education through the provision of teachers. Peace Corps also is assisting in health and environment sectors. Currently, about 147 volunteers are serving in Tanzania. First Lady Laura Bush visited Dar es Salaam and Zanzibar in mid-July 2005.: Tanzania has an embassy in Washington, D.C.; United States has an embassy in Dar es Salaam.

=== Asia ===
Country	Formal Relations Began	Notes
China	9 December 1961	See China–Tanzania relations China established diplomatic relations with Tanganyika and Zanzibar on 9 December 1961 and 11 December 1963 respectively. When Tanganyika and Zanzibar were united and became Tanzania on 26 April 1964, it is natural for China to extend its diplomatic ties with it. Tanzania has had good relations with the People's Republic of China over the past 30 years, recently receiving the Chinese president (February 2009). This relationship is linked with bi-lateral co-operation including the TAZARA Railway project on the Tanzanian mainland.: China has an embassy in Dar es Salaam and a consulate-general in Zanzibar.; Tanzania has an embassy in Beijing.
India	9 December 1961	See India–Tanzania relations Both countries established diplomatic relations on 9 December 1961: India has a High Commission in Dar es Salaam.; Tanzania maintains a High Commission in New Delhi.
Israel	20 December 1961	Both countries established diplomatic relations on 20 December 1961. Tanzania broke off diplomatic relations with Israel 19 October 1973. Diplomatic relations were re-establish on 24 February 1995.: Israel is accredited to Tanzania from its embassy in Nairobi, Kenya.; Tanzania has an embassy in Tel Aviv.
Malaysia		See Malaysia–Tanzania relations: Malaysia is accredited to Tanzania from its high commission in Nairobi, Kenya.; Tanzania has a high commission in Kuala Lumpur.
Palestine	1973	Tanzania officially recognised Palestine as a sovereign state on 24 November 1988. In October 2011, Tanzanian Foreign Minister Bernard Membe affirmed that his country would give everything required to support Palestine in gaining membership within the United Nations and any other international organisation.
Saudi Arabia	11 April 1984	See Saudi Arabia–Tanzania relations Both countries established diplomatic relations on 11 April 1984
South Korea	30 April 1992	See South Korea–Tanzania relations Both countries established diplomatic relations on 30 April 1992 High-level Exchanges 1994 May Special Envoy of the President Han Wan-sang 1994 October Special Envoy of the President Hong Soon-young 1999 April Minister for Trade Han Duck-soo 2005 January Minister of Foreign Affairs and Trade Ban Ki-moon 2005 December Special Envoy oh the President Kwon Jin-ho 2006 May Minister of Foreign Affairs and Trade Ban Ki-moon 2009 March Chairman of Korea Foundation Lim Sung-jun 2009 August Chairman of Truth and Reconciliation Commission Ahn Byung-wook 2010 May Deputy Prime Minister Park Young-joon.: South Korea has an embassy in Dar es Salaam.; Tanzania has an embassy in Seoul.
Turkey	5 July 1963	See Tanzania–Turkey relations Both countries established diplomatic relations on 5 July 1963 when accredited first Ambassador of Turkey to Tanganyika (resident in Addis Ababa) Mr. Mehmed Osman Dostel.: Tanzania has an embassy in Ankara.; Turkey has an embassy in Dar es Salaam.; Trade volume between the two countries was 151 million USD in 2015.; There are direct flights from Istanbul to Dar es Salaam and Kilimanjaro since 2010.
United Arab Emirates		See Tanzania–United Arab Emirates relations: Tanzania has an embassy in Abu Dhabi and a consulate-general in Dubai.; United Arab Emirates has an embassy in Dar es Salaam.

=== Europe ===
Country	Formal Relations Began	Notes
Denmark	8 December 1964	See Denmark–Tanzania relations
Germany	9 December 1961	See Germany–Tanzania relations Both countries established diplomatic relations on 9 December 1961: Germany has an embassy in Dar es Salaam.; Tanzania has an embassy in Berlin.
Poland	15 January 1962	See Poland–Tanzania relations Both countries established diplomatic relations on 15 January 1962: Poland has an embassy in Dar es Salaam.; Tanzania is accredited to Poland from its embassy in Berlin, Germany.
Russia	11 December 1961	See Russia–Tanzania relations Both countries established diplomatic relations on 11 December 1961: Russia has an embassy in Dar es Salaam.; Tanzania has an embassy in Moscow.
United Kingdom	22 April 1964	See Tanzania–United Kingdom relations British Foreign Secretary David Lammy with Tanzanian Foreign Minister Mahmoud Thabit Kombo at a Commonwealth summit in Apia, October 2024. Tanzania established diplomatic relations with the United Kingdom on 22 April 1964.: Tanzania maintains a high commission in London.; The United Kingdom is accredited to Tanzania through its high commission in Dar es Salaam.; The UK governed Tanganyika from 1916 to 1961, when Tanganyika achieved full independence; the UK governed Zanzibar from 1890 to 1963, when Zanzibar achieved full independence. Both countries unified on 26 April 1964 to become Tanzania. Both countries share common membership of the Commonwealth, and the World Trade Organization. Bilaterally the two countries have a Development Partnership, and a High Level Prosperity Partnership.

== International trips made by presidents of Tanzania ==
=== John Magufuli ===
Countries by Magufuli visited during his presidency 2015-2021

John Magufuli made a 10 International trips to 8 countries during his presidency. Magufuli famously was the first Tanzania president to not travel outside of Africa. The president cracked down on large foreign delegations and usually sent his Vice-President Samia Suluhu Hassan to represent him. The president served six years and made the least international official visits than any of his predecessors.

All his visits were bilateral except he attended one African Union Heads of State Summit in Ethiopia and another East African Community heads of state summit in Uganda.

=== Samia Suluhu ===
Countries visited by Samia Suluhu during her presidency

Samia Suluhu made her first international trip in April 2021 since she began her presidency on 19 March 2021. Once president she aimed to regain the country's former position in the international community and began to embark on foreign trips.

== See also ==
- List of diplomatic missions in Tanzania
- List of diplomatic missions of Tanzania
- Tanzania and the Non-Aligned Movement

== Sources ==
- CIA World Factbook 2000.
