= Fifth inauguration of Paul Kagame =

Presidential inauguration in Rwanda

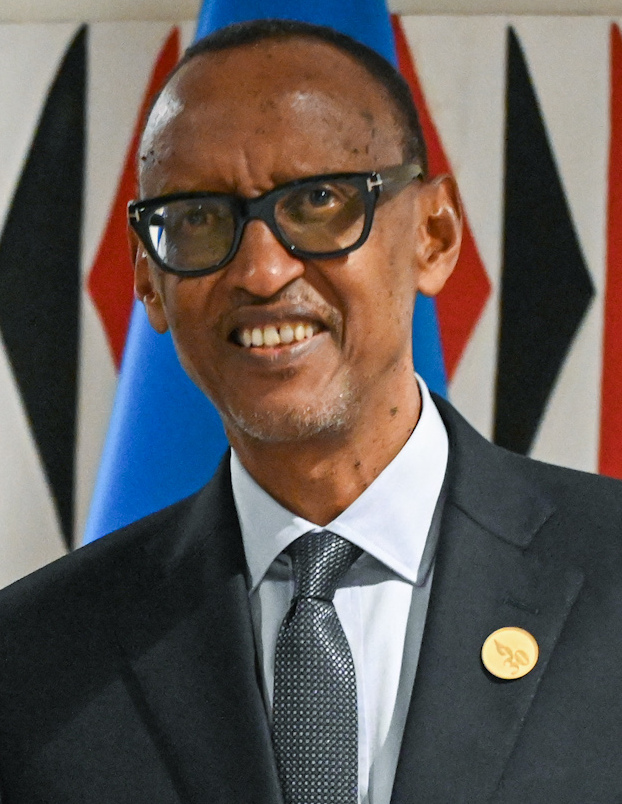
Paul Kagame in 2024

The inauguration of Paul Kagame as the president of Rwanda took place on August 11, 2024, at Amahoro National Stadium in Kigali, Rwanda. This marked the beginning of Kagame's new term of a five-year term following his overwhelming victory in the 2024 presidential election where he received 99.18% of the vote. The ceremony was attended by numerous dignitaries, including at least 22 heads of state, as well as thousands of Rwandans and international guests.

== Background ==
Paul Kagame has been the facto leader of Rwanda since the end of the 1994 genocide against Tutsi and he has held the official title of President since 2000. His leadership is credited with stabilizing and rebuilding Rwanda after the 1994 genocide against tutsi. fostering economic growth, and maintaining peace in the country. Kagame's victory in 2024 election was his latest in series of electoral wins, each with more than 93% of the vote. The 2024 election was conducted under the constitutional amendments of 2015, which reduced presidential terms from seven to five years.

== Election and transition ==
In the 2024 presidential election, Kagame faced two challengers : Frank Habineza of the Democratic Green party of Rwanda and an independent candidate Philippe Mpayimana. Both candaidates received less than 1% of the vote collectively. The election saw a high voter turnout, with 98% of the approximatively 9 million eligible voters participating

== Ceremony ==
The inauguration ceremony took place at the renovated Amahoro National stadium in Kigali, which was filled to capacity with 45,000 attendees. The event was marked by military parades, musical performances and the presence of high-profile international guests, including 22 Heads of state from across Africa.

== Oath ==
Chief Justice Dr. Faustin Nteziryayo administered the presidential oath, during which Kagame pledged to "preserve peace and national sovereignty, consolidate national unity " and uphold the constitution of Rwanda. Following the oath, Kagame received the symbolic instruments of power, a copy of the constitution, the national flag, the coat of arms and a shield and sword symbolizing national defence, presented by the RDF chief of Defence Staff, General Mubarakh Muganga. Kagame's inaugural address focused on themes of unity, peace and continued development for Rwanda. He emphasized the importance of the country's political process in deepening national unity and reiterated his commitment to leading Rwanda on a path of prosperity and innovation. Paul Kagame leadership, he asserted, has been transformative for Rwanda, lifting it from its tragic past to a promising future

== Dignitaries in attendance ==
The ceremony was attended by numerous international dignitaries, including:

- Samia Suluhu Hassan, President of Tanzania
- William Ruto, President of Kenya
- Andry Rajoelina, President of Madagascar
- Joāo Lourenco, President of Angola
- Denis Sassou Nguesso, President of Congo-Brazzaville
- Faustin-Archange Touadera, President of the Central African Republic
- Philippe Nyusi, President of Mozambique
- Sahle-Work Zewde, President of Ethiopia
- Ismail Omar Guelleh, President of Djibouti
- Moussa Faki Mahamat, Chairperson of the African Union Commission
- Louise Mushikiwabo, Secretary-General of La Francophonie

In addition to these leaders, the event was attended by high-ranking officials from across Africa and representatives from international organizations.

== Media coverage ==
The inauguration was widely covered by both international and local media. The event was broadcast live by (RBA) Rwanda Broadcasting Agency and other media outlets, ensuring that millions of Rwandans, both in the country and abroad, could witness the ceremony. The coverage included live streaming on platforms such as YouTube and detailed update on social media.
