= South Korea–Tanzania relations =

- South Korea: Tanzania

Diplomatic mission
- Embassy of Korea, Dar-es-salaam: Embassy of Tanzania, Seoul

Envoy
- Ambassador: Ambassador

South Korea–Tanzania relations are the bilateral relations between South Korea and Tanzania. The two countries established bilateral relations on April 30, 1992, and have maintained cordial relations since.

== History ==
Tanzania maintained diplomatic ties with South Korea with its embassy in Japan since the establishment of diplomatic ties between the two countries on 30 April 1992. In 2017, under president John Magufuli, an embassy was set up in Seoul at the 25th anniversary of diplomatic relations celebration. The embassy opened its doors in February 2018. South Korea issued a special travel advisory in November 2025 on most parts of Tanzania due to protests after the general election. Based on Korea's four-level travel alert system, it’s a Level 2.5 and “urged Korean citizens to cancel or postpone their trips to Tanzania and for those living there to flee to a safe country unless for urgent matters”. Tanzania has been one of South Korea's top official development assistance partners since 2010; this policy was extended for the years 2025–2030. With a framework agreement worth US$2.5 billion for 2024–2028, it is the biggest recipient in Africa of South Korea's concessional credit program for development cooperation projects.

On 25 February 2026, in a meeting led by the deputy of the Ministry of Foreign Affairs and East African Cooperation, Ngwaru J. Maghembe and Korea’s Ambassador to Tanzania, Ahn Eun-Ju, the two countries have once again committed in their multilateral and bilateral cooperations which includes collaborating in projects from infrastructure to agriculture.

== High level visits ==
There have been no official state visits from South Korea to Tanzania.

=== Tanzanian visits to South Korea ===
- September 2009, Tanzanian prime minister Mizengo Pinda visited the Republic of Korea where he met the prime minister Han Seung-soo and President Lee Myung-bak.
- In May 2024, Tanzanian president Samia Suluhu Hassan made a state visit to South Korea. She was received by South Korean president Yoon Suk Yeol.

== Diplomatic relations ==
- South Korea maintains an embassy in Dar es Salaam.
- Tanzania maintains an embassy in Seoul.

Ambassadors of Tanzania to South Korea include:

- Matilda Swilla Masuka (2017–2021)
- Togolani Edriss Mavura (2021–May 2026)
- Noel Emmanuel Kaganda (May 2026–Present)

== See also ==
- Foreign relations of South Korea
- Foreign relations of Tanzania
