= Oman–Tanzania relations =

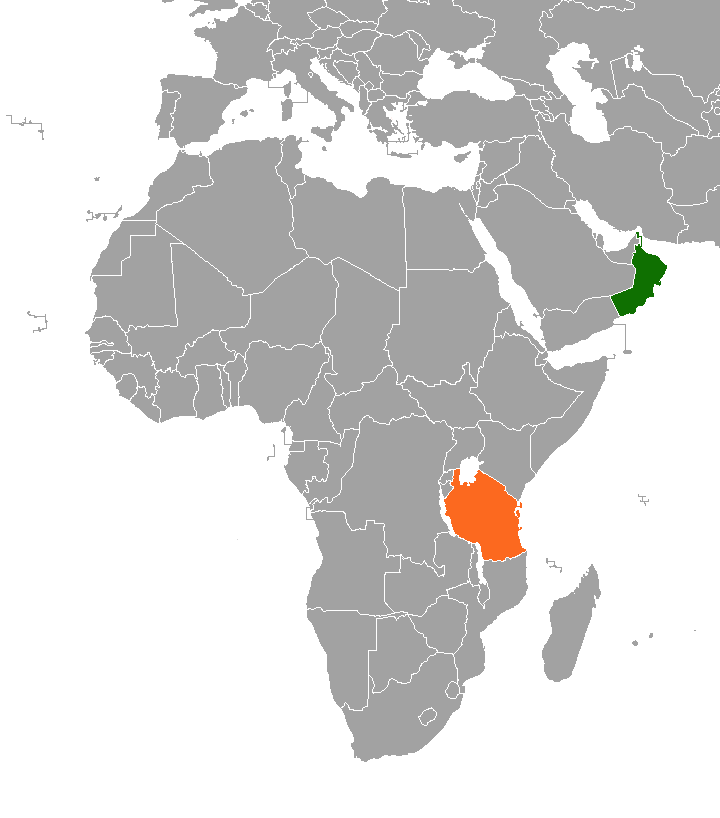

- Oman: Tanzania

Diplomatic mission
- Embassy of Oman, Dar es Salaam: Embassy of Tanzania, Muscat

Oman–Tanzania relations are the bilateral relations between Oman and Tanzania. The Sultanate of Oman has one of the oldest historical relationships with communities in Tanzania, namely in Zanzibar. Oman is the only country outside Africa where Swahili is spoken by a small portion of its society, and it has cultural and ethnic ties to Tanzania.

== History ==
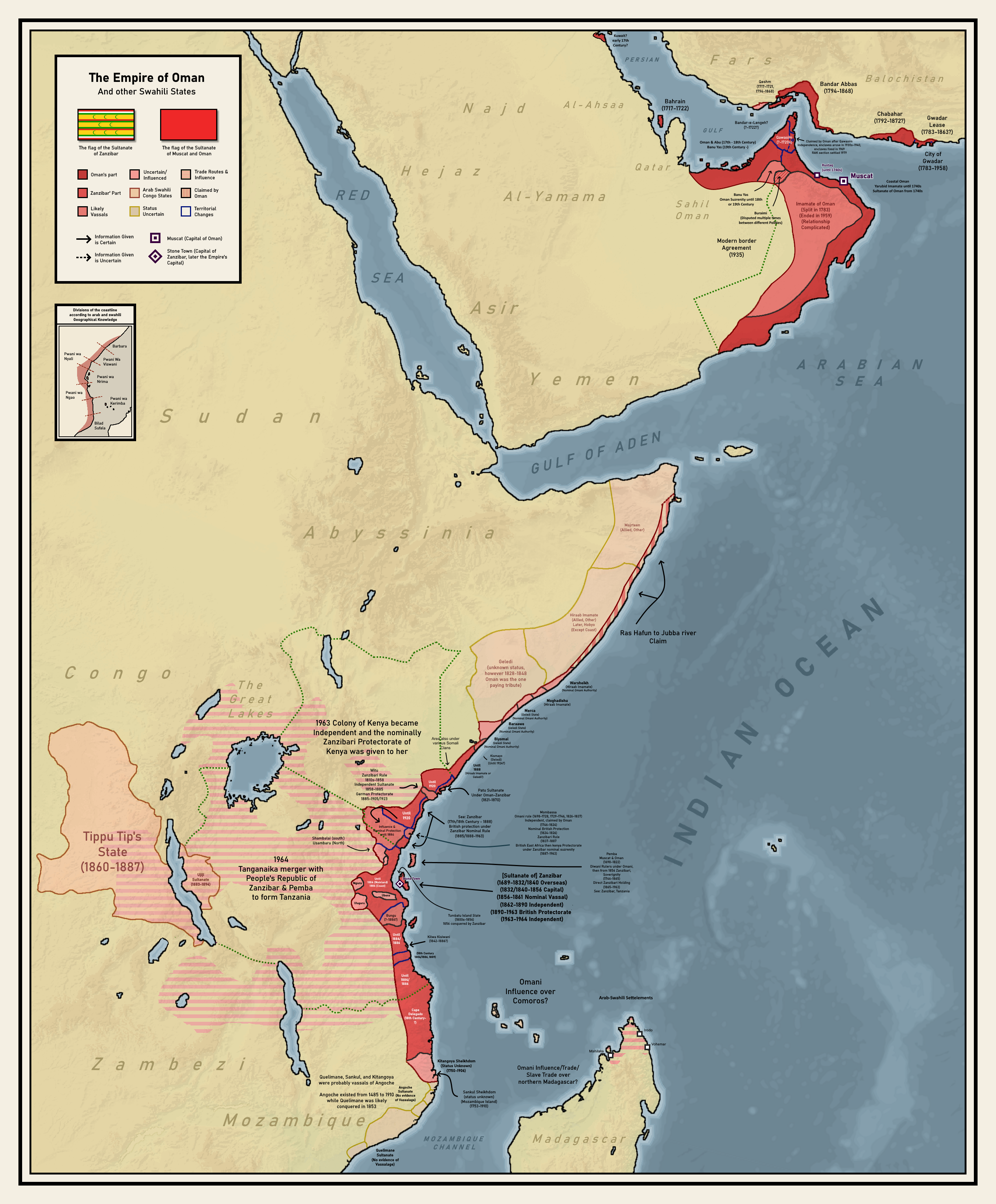
Extent of the Omani Empire, showing its territories, influences, claims, and losses.

Zanzibar, a semi-autonomous archipelago in Tanzania, has had a relationship with Oman since the 17th century. In 1698, Zanzibar became part of the overseas holdings of Oman after Saif bin Sultan, the Imam of Oman, defeated the Portuguese. In the 1830s, Omani ruler Said bin Sultan moved his court from Muscat to Stone Town. The sultanate controlled large parts of the Tanzanian Mainland coast and continued to trade with inland communities. This led to many Omani people settling in Tanzania. Following the 1964 Zanzibar Revolution and subsequent massacre of Arabs, many Omanis were expelled from the islands. However, many still continue to maintain familial relations with family in Oman.

== Economic relations ==
Trade between the two countries, Tanzania and Oman, As of 2022, stood at ~US$259 million. Tanzania imported goods worth ~US$259 million, while its exports stood at ~US$60.5 million. Tanzania imports from Oman are mostly oil derivative products, such as plastics, while exports are mostly meat & foodstuffs.

== Transport links ==
Direct air connections connect Oman and Tanzania, with services operated between Muscat International Airport and both Julius Nyerere International Airport in Dar es Salaam and Abeid Amani Karume International Airport in Zanzibar. In July 2026, Air Tanzania launched a thrice-weekly service on the Dar es Salaam–Muscat–Zanzibar route, expanding bilateral transport options alongside existing services by Oman Air. The air links facilitate trade in agricultural, horticultural, and seafood exports, as well as passenger transit and tourism between the Gulf region and East Africar.

== Diplomatic relations ==
Both countries have established diplomatic missions in their respective countries and have various co-operative agreements between them in Trade, Politics, Higher education and most importantly, cooperation in records and archives.

== High level state visits ==
- October 2012 - Jakaya Kikwete, President of Tanzania, made a state visit to Oman.
- June 2022 - Samia Suluhu Hassan, President of Tanzania, made a state visit to Oman.
- October 2022 - Hussein Mwinyi, President of Zanzibar, made a state visit to Oman.

== Resident diplomatic missions ==
- Oman has an embassy in Dar es Salaam and a Consulate in Zanzibar City.
- Tanzania has an embassy in Muscat.
