= Hip-Hop Asili Festival =

Annual hip-hop festival in Tanzania

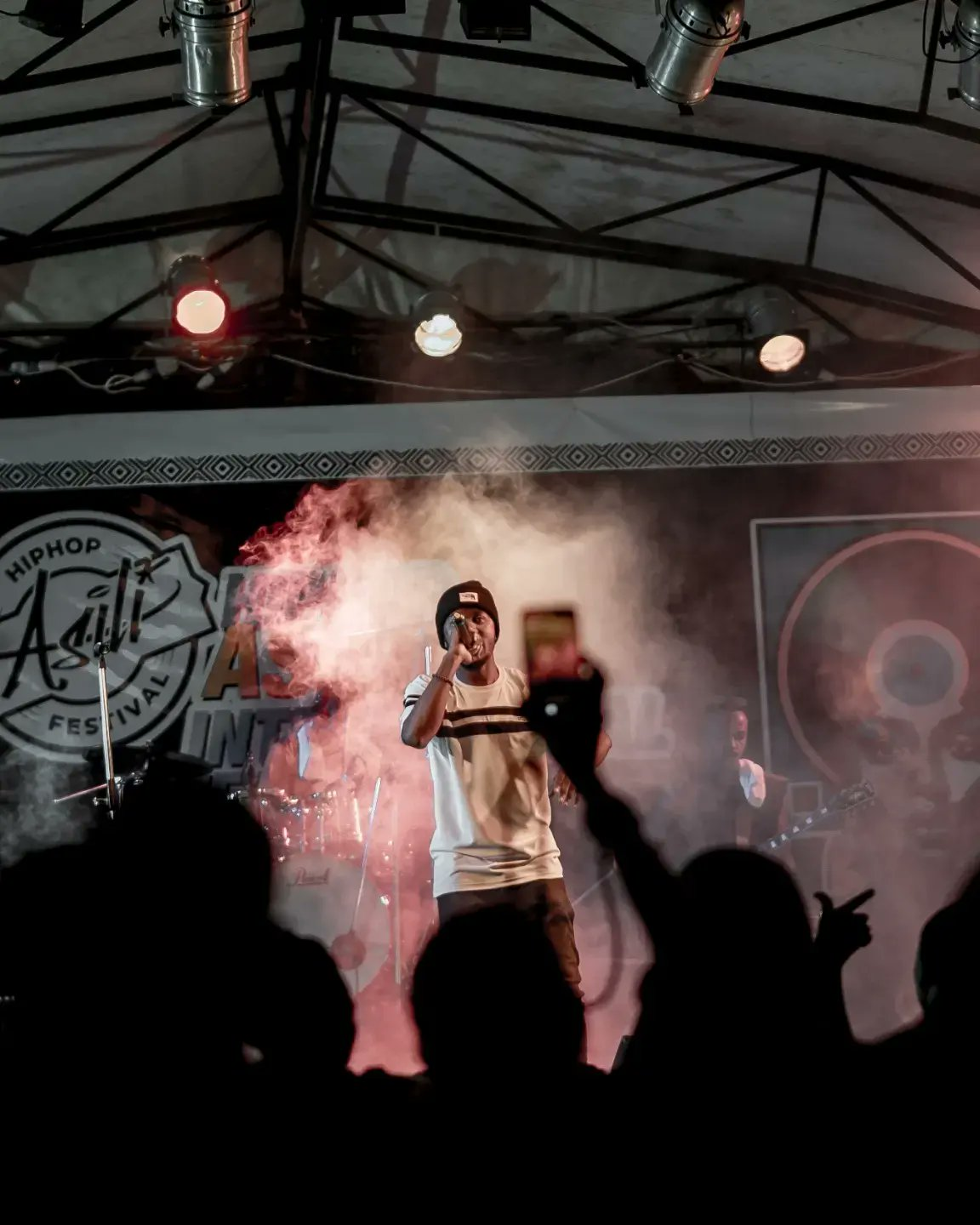
- Dizasta Vina performs at Hip hop Festival Asili in June 2023
- Genre: Hip hop
- Dates: Last Week of June
- Locations: Dar-es-Salaam, Tanzania
- Years active: 2021 - present
- Founders: Matei Babu and WePresent France

The Hip-Hop Asili Festival (HAF) is an annual celebration of hip-hop music and culture in Tanzania. It is produced by local artists and supported by the French Embassy in Tanzania.

== History ==
The first Hip-Hop Asili Festival was held in June 2021. It is the first international hip-hop festival in East Africa. The performances were held at Nafasi Arts Space (2021 first edition), Alliance Française (2022/2023 editions) both located in Dar es Salaam and Tasuba arts school located in Bagamyo (2024/2025 editions).

== Overview ==
Rappers, DJs, breakdancers and graffiti artists entertained and educated in a celebration of hip-hop culture. In June 2021, emerging and established artists from across the country came together at the Dar es Salaam arts centre as it hosted the first ever Asili Festival with support from the French Embassy in Tanzania. The three-day event began with workshops from the likes of veteran rappers Nash MC and Jay and Dar graffiti collective Wachata Crew. There were also live performances from homegrown talent such as Juma Nature, Nikki Mbishi, Dizasta Vina, Mex Cortez and JCB Makalla and US rapper Balance Thee Ekwayzion. The festival finale was an amazing performance by SwahiliFrench band East Africa Riseup. The Nafasi stage also hosted a series of competitions to find the country's best rappers, DJs and breakdancers. Arusha confirmed its place as Tanzania's hotbed of hip-hop talent with artists from the region claiming all the top prizes. RMC was named best rapper, DJ Cent255 won the DJ award and one vs one Kilimbo Skills took home the breakdancing trophy.

== See also ==
- List of hip hop music festivals
- Hip hop culture
