= Tanzania–Turkey relations =

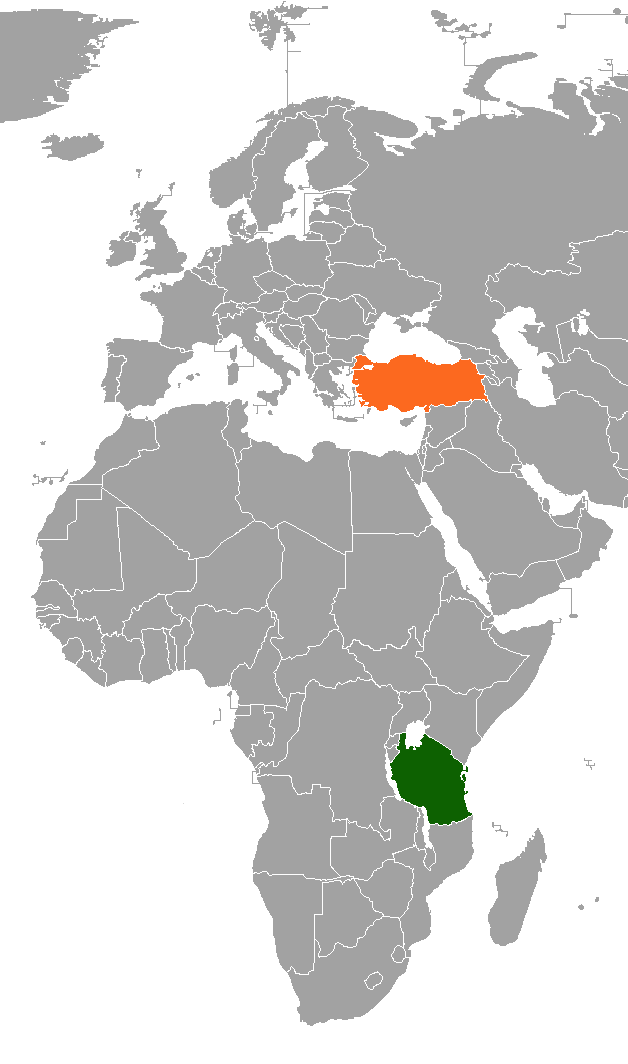
- Tanzania: Turkey

Tanzania–Turkey relations are the foreign relations between Tanzania and Turkey. The Turkish embassy in Dar es Salaam first opened in 1979, although the Ottoman Empire had previously opened a consulate in Zanzibar, now a part of Tanzania, on March 17, 1837.

== Diplomatic relations ==
Turkey had friendly relations with Tanzania under the founding president Julius Nyerere, who cooperated with Turkey in opposing colonialism and apartheid in Africa. The relations became cooler when Julius Nyerere allowed Che Guevera to use Tanzania during his failed intervention in the Congolese civil war.

After Julius Nyerere’s retirement, relations with Tanzania improved because of Tanzania's progress in democratization and social progress.

=== Bilateral Visits ===
- In 2010, Jakaya Kikwete made a state visit to Turkey.
- In January 2017, Recep Tayyip Erdoğan made a state visit to Tanzania.
- In April 2024, Samia Suluhu Hassan made a state visit to Turkey.

=== 2023 Turkey–Syria earthquake ===
Tanzania donated $1 million (Sh2.3 billion) for humanitarian aid to earthquake victims in Turkey and Syria as a return to Turkey for being an initiator in the Tanzania standard gauge railway project.

== Economic relations ==
- Trade volume between the two countries was 151 million USD in 2015.
- There are direct flights from Istanbul to Dar es Salaam and Kilimanjaro since December 4, 2012.

== See also ==
- Foreign relations of Tanzania
- Foreign relations of Turkey
