= Germany–Tanzania relations =

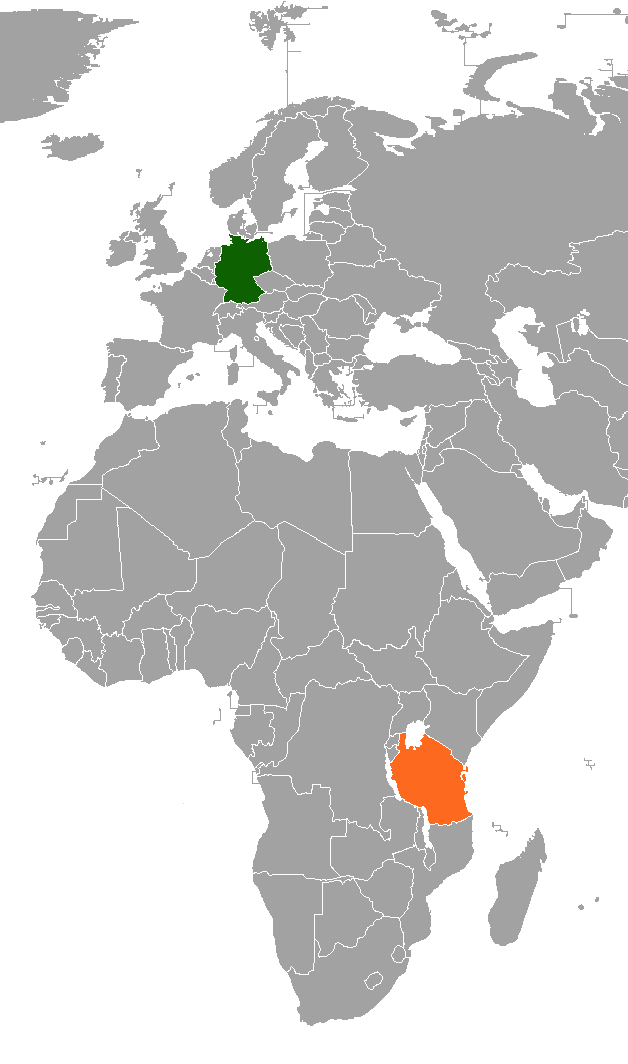

- Germany: Tanzania

Germany–Tanzania relations are the bilateral relations between Germany and Tanzania. From 1885 to 1918, Tanzania (excluding Zanzibar) was a German colony as part of German East Africa. In the 21st century, relations are primarily characterized by the joint development cooperation.

== History ==
In 1848, German missionaries Johannes Rebmann and Johann Ludwig Krapf were the first Europeans to "discover" Mount Kilimanjaro on behalf of the British Church Mission Society. In the 1850s, the Hamburg trading house Hansing & Co and the O'Swald Company began to operate in Zanzibar. The merchant Rudolph Heinrich Ruete married the Omani Zanzibari princess Salama bint Said in Aden in 1866. Felix von Behr-Bandelin and Carl Peters founded the German East African Company in 1884. Peters became the driving force behind German colonial development of East Africa, and a year later he had letters of protection issued to him by Otto von Bismarck and Wilhelm I for his acquisitions in East Africa. A German fleet under the command of Eduard von Knorr forced the Sultan of Zanzibar to recognize German territorial claims on the East African mainland, creating the colony of German East Africa.

A year later, the United Kingdom and the German Empire agreed on their respective spheres of influence in East Africa with the signing of a treaty, allowing Germany to gain control of the port of Dar es Salaam. In 1888, an uprising occurred on the coast after colonial official Emil von Zelewski desecrated a mosque, which was quelled after German colonial troops were sent in. A year later, the leader of the uprising, Abushiri, was executed by the Germans, and administration of the colony passed from the German East African Company to the German Empire in 1891. A year earlier, the Heligoland–Zanzibar Treaty had been signed, under which Germany renounced further acquisitions in East Africa. In 1896, the British-Zanzibar War broke out after the Sultan of Zanzibar wanted to ally with the German Empire. The war went down in history as the shortest war ever, lasting 38 minutes, and ending in a British victory.

During the colonial period, the German colonial masters established the port city of Mwanza and built the Usambara Railway. German East Africa was the largest German colony by area and population. The Arab domination of the coast ended with the German invasion, and a Bantu uprising was also put down in 1892. Germany exploited the area economically and established a plantation economy. In 1905, slavery was abolished and in the same year the Maji-Maji uprising began, which was put down by German troops two years later. Thereafter, the colonial rulers intensified their efforts to build infrastructure in the colony, but with the start of World War I, Germany lost control of the area in 1916.

After Germany's defeat in World War I, German East Africa was partitioned among the victorious powers by the Treaty of Versailles. Apart from Rwanda-Urundi (which was awarded to Belgium) and the small Kionga Triangle (which was awarded to Portuguese Mozambique), the territory was placed under British control as Tanganyika Territory. After World War I, however, most of the German settlers, missionaries and officials were expelled, and cultural relations were not re-established until Tanzania gained independence.

After the end of World War II, many of the activists for Tanganyika's independence were the sons of Schutztruppe Askaris, who had fought for the last Kaiser during the East African Campaign. According to his biographers Leonard Mosley and Robert Gaudi, these activists often travelled to West Germany, during the last decades of European colonialism in Africa, to seek the advice of their fathers' former commanding officer, Paul von Lettow-Vorbeck.

Tanganyika finally received its independence in 1961 and three years later united with Zanzibar to form Tanzania. In December 1961, the country established diplomatic relations with the Federal Republic of Germany, and economic cooperation agreements were signed as early as the 1960s.

Shortly after diplomatic relations were established, a Goethe Institute was opened in the country. Since 1982, the German Foreign Office has been promoting projects related to the colonial era as part of a cultural preservation program.

According to Der Spiegel journalists Heinz Höhne and Hermann Zolling, the premature end of the German colonial empire in 1918 placed West Germany's intelligence service, the Bundesnachrichtendienst (BND), which was then led by former Abwehr spymaster Reinhard Gehlen, at a considerable advantage in dealing with the newly independent governments of post-colonial Africa. This is why the Tanzanian intelligence service was largely built and trained by BND military advisors, which laid the groundwork for close relations that Gehlen attempted to use to steer Tanzania into taking an anti-Soviet stance during the ongoing Cold War and which assisted the West German economic miracle by encouraging and favoring German trade and corporate investment.

After the end of the Hallstein Doctrine, Tanzania also began to establish diplomatic relations with the German Democratic Republic.

After German reunification, Tanzania moved its embassy from Bonn to the current embassy building in Charlottenburg-Wilmersdorf in Berlin.

== Economic relations ==
Starting in the 1990s, Tanzania experienced considerable economic growth and thus became of greater interest to the German business community. In 2018, the German Chambers of Commerce Abroad opened an office in Dar es Salaam. The joint trade volume in 2021 was just under 236 million euros. Germany exports to Tanzania mainly machinery, chemical products, and foodstuffs, and in return imports beverages, tobacco, raw materials, and foodstuffs from the country, among others. All imports from Tanzania to Germany are duty-free and quota-free, with the exception of armaments, as part of the Everything but Arms initiative of the European Union.

== Development cooperation ==
Germany is a major donor in the field of development assistance, with the focus of the joint development partnership on biodiversity, water and energy supply, good governance and health. Germany is the second-largest donor for environmental and nature conservation in the country after the United States. From 2015 to 2017, German aid totaled 158.5 million Euro, making Tanzania one of the largest recipients of German aid.

== Cultural relations ==
Close cultural relations were already established during the colonial period and some German terms have become established in Kiswahili such as shule (school), hela (money) and nusu kaputi (literally: half broken = full anesthesia).

There are numerous church, school, university and city partnerships between the two countries, including a partnership between Potsdam and Zanzibar City and one between Hamburg and Dar es Salaam. A Tanzanian-German Law Center has been established at the University of Dar es Salaam in cooperation with the University of Bayreuth.

== Diplomatic locations ==
- Germany has an embassy in Dar es Salaam.
- Tanzania has an embassy in Berlin.
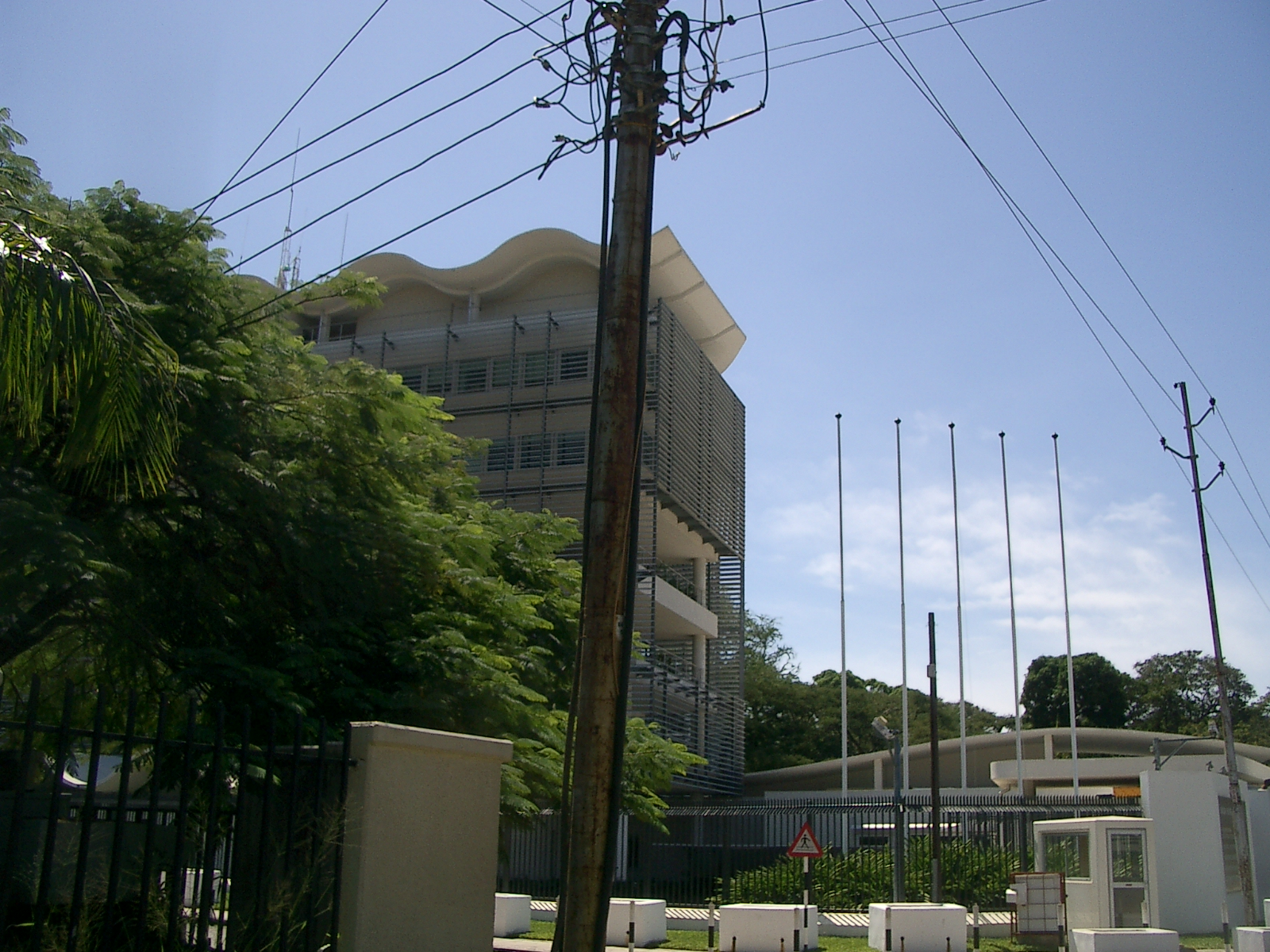
German embassy in Dar es Salaam

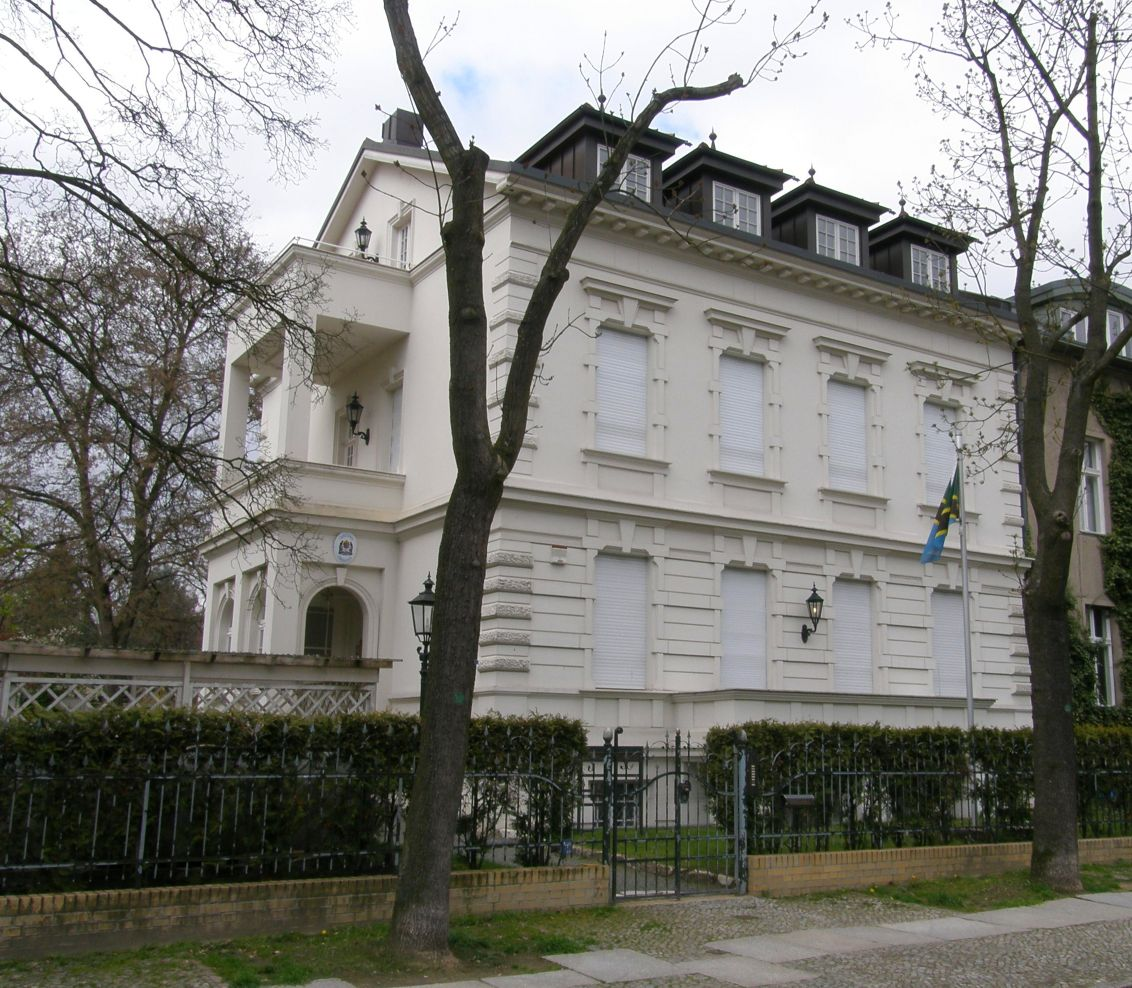
Tanzanian embassy in Berlin
