= Rwanda–Tanzania relations =

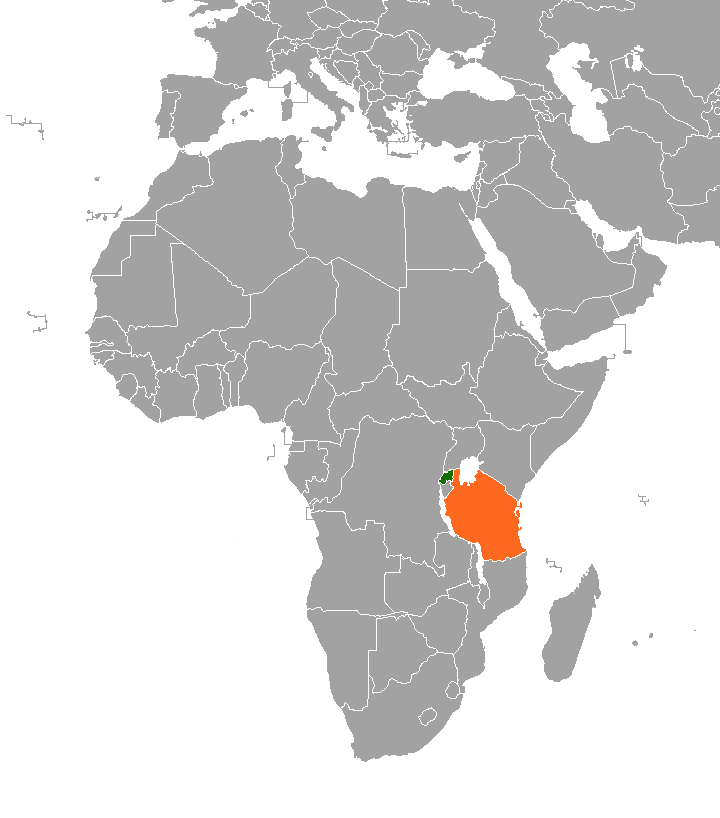
- Rwanda: Tanzania

Rwanda–Tanzania relations are the bilateral diplomatic relations between Rwanda and Tanzania. Both countries are member states of the African Union and the Commonwealth of Nations. The two countries share a 222 km international border.

== History ==
Both Rwanda and Tanzania have diplomatic missions in their respective countries.

== FDLR controversy ==
On 26 May 2013, Jakaya Kikwete said at a meeting of the African Union that if President Joseph Kabila of the Democratic Republic of the Congo (DRC) could negotiate with the March 23 Movement (M23), President Yoweri Museveni of Uganda and President Paul Kagame of Rwanda should be able to negotiate with the Allied Democratic Forces-National Army for the Liberation of Uganda and the Democratic Forces for the Liberation of Rwanda (FDLR), respectively. In response, Museveni expressed his willingness to negotiate.

An anonymous person on 31 May then posted on a blog hosted by the Tanzanian Ministry of Information, Youth, Culture and Sports,

Rwanda has a tendency of not taking kindly any form of criticism, from within or without. And its leadership comes across as snobbish and delusional. May be the Western countries' plaudits about its so-called success story have finally got to the heads of Rwandan leaders so much that they think they know it all.

In early June 2013, Tanzania's Minister of Foreign Affairs and International Co-operation, Bernard Membe, said in the Tanzania National Assembly,

Rwanda has issued a statement opposing the advice by President Kikwete that this was the right time to hold peace talks with the country's rebels, most of whom are in DRC forests and against whom the government has unsuccessfully fought for nearly 17 years. President Kikwete will not apologize because his statement was based on facts. ... We and Rwanda are friends. We have nothing to negotiate. But they should know that principally we ought to make peace with enemies and negotiate with our enemies and not friends. We say that President Kagame should admit that the time is now and this is not a new phenomenon because in all the areas where liberation movements are, talks have been made. What we are saying is that President Kagame and [the] Rwandan government should know that it is time for talks with [the] opposition.

A week later, Kagame said about Kikwete's statement,

I [initially] kept quiet about this because of the contempt I have for it. I thought it was utter nonsense. Maybe it was due to ignorance but if this is an ideological problem for anyone to be thinking this way, then it better stay with those who have it.

Kikwete's encouragement of negotiations between Rwanda and the FDLR has been interpreted as showing support for perpetrators of genocide. The organization known as the "19th Commemoration of the Genocide against Tutsi in Rwanda in the U.S.A." wrote an open letter on 27 May 2013 to President Barack Obama requesting that Kikwete withdraw his comments and apologize.

== See also ==
- Foreign relations of Rwanda
- Foreign relations of Tanzania
