= Kenya–Tanzania relations =

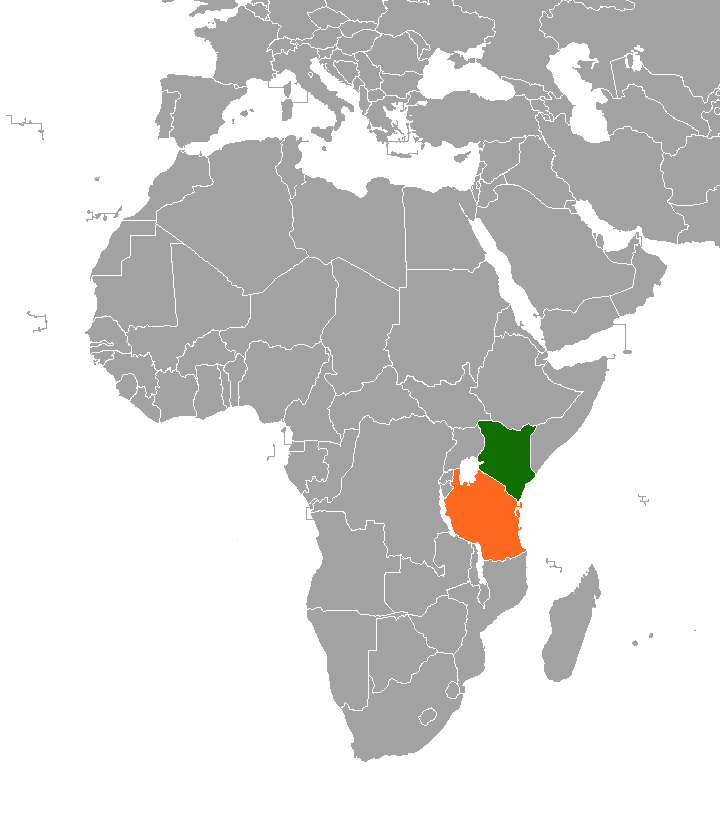
- Kenya: Tanzania

Kenya–Tanzania relations are bilateral relations between Tanzania and Kenya. Tanzania is a partner of Kenya in many areas, particularly trade, security (military), education, agriculture and energy.

== History ==
In 1888, the Imperial British East Africa Company began operating in Mombasa after the Berlin Conference as the Scramble for Africa led by the German chancellor Otto von Bismarck. The German Empire on the other hand began to establish control over the region and was formally declared a protectorate in 1891 as the German East Africa (present-day Tanzania). In 1895, the British East Africa which will later become known as British Kenya after defeating the Germans during the First World War as Britain become a mandate of Tanganyika while the Belgian Congo mandated Ruanda-Urundi (present-day Rwanda) as a trust territory of Belgium after the Tabora offensive. With Lettow-Vorbeck returned to Germany in 1919. Following the Italian invasion of Ethiopia led by the fascist dictator Benito Mussolini to form Italy's African colony as the Italian East Africa, Britain again declared war on Fascist Italy in 1940 during the Second World War until Ethiopia was liberated from the Italians in 1941. Tanzania gained its independence from the United Kingdom in 1961, followed by Kenya on 12 December 1963. The first high commissions of Kenya in Tanzania and vice versa were opened after the independence of Kenya. However, after the breakup of the EAC in 1977 both countries severed diplomatic ties. The breakup of the first EAC which was founded in 1967 was brought about by ideological differences between Tanzania and Kenya. As it was during the cold war African countries were making decisions on whether to become socialist or capitalist. Kenya's leader Jomo Kenyatta was intent on making sure that Kenya wouldn't become socialist and Kenya stuck to capitalism. Tanzania on the other hand championed for Ujamaa, a major African socialist policy.

Tanzania and Kenya resumed diplomatic ties in 1983. By that time, a lot of factors were slowing the idea of Ujamaa in Tanzania among them the war with Uganda and many other social factors.

Today both countries enjoy healthy relations. Both countries are inhabited by the world's largest Swahili speaking populations, Swahili is the official and national language in both countries. Kenya and Tanzania share a lot of cultural similarities.

=== High-level visits ===
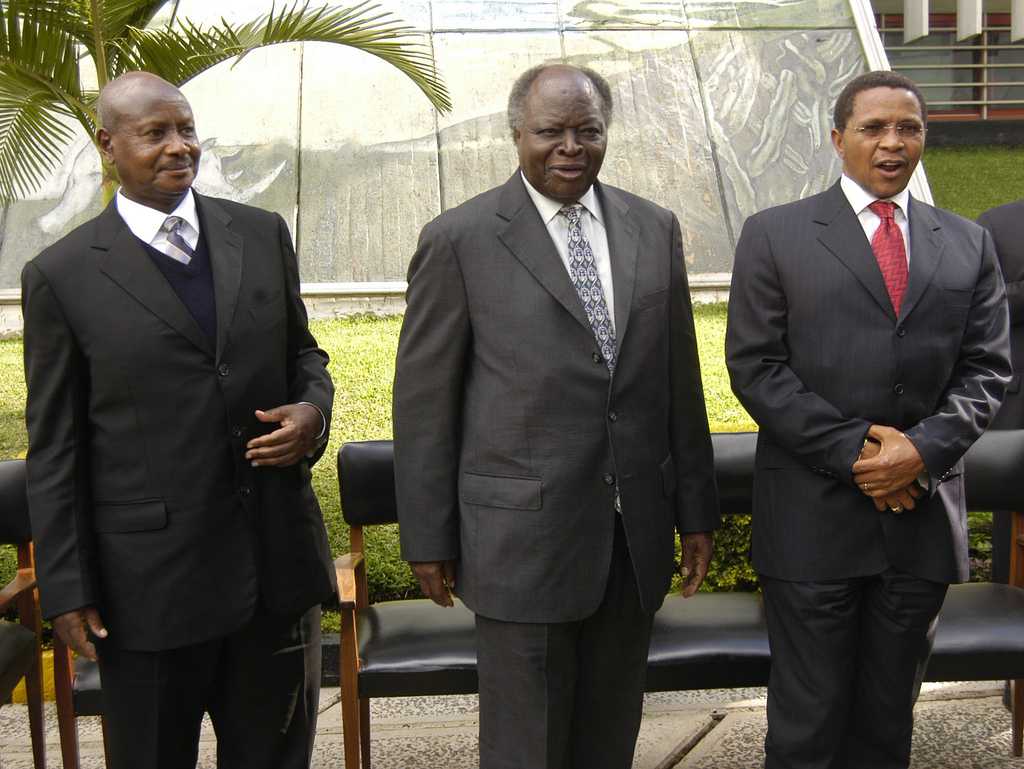
President Mwai Kibaki (Kenya) center, President Yoweri Museveni (Uganda) left and President Jakaya Kikwete (Tanzania) right during the 8th EAC summit in Arusha

Presidents of Tanzania and Kenya have on multiple occasions made state visits to each other's country.

== Trade and economy ==
In September 2014, Tanzania was the largest export destination of Kenyan goods within East Africa. Kenya's total exports to Tanzania in 2011 were valued at 488 million U.S. dollars as compared to 390 million dollars in 2010. Kenya's imports from Tanzania were valued at 185.4 million dollars in 2011, an increase from 126 million dollars in 2010. In the years between 2007 and 2008 Tanzanian exports to Kenya increased by 17%. The balance of trade still favours Kenya.

=== FDI ===
Kenyan firms have operations in Tanzania. Some of which are Kenya Airways, Kenya Commercial Bank (Tanzania), Equity Bank (Tanzania) etc.

In 2009 Kenyan investment was estimated at over Kes. 160 billion (US$2 billion) making Kenya the second largest FDI contributors in Tanzania.

=== Infrastructure ===
Tanzania and Kenya are connected by road and rail. A massive amount of money has been allocated to upgrade and maintain the infrastructure that connects both countries. At one time, President Uhuru Kenyatta made one of his state visits to Tanzania by road.

== EAC ==
On 7 July 2000, Tanzania and Kenya along with Uganda reestablished the EAC. The EAC has contributed a great deal in improving trade and overall relations between both countries

== Issues ==
Kenya and Tanzania have been at odds over economic and logistic issues, with traders from both countries rivaling each other. Despite both countries being part of the East African Community, border checks and conflicts have resulted in occasional unrest and protests along the border.

== Resident diplomatic missions ==
- Kenya has a high commission in Dar es Salaam.
- Tanzania has a high commission in Nairobi and a consulate-general in Mombasa.

== See also ==
- East African Community (EAC)
- African Free Trade Zone
