= Tanzania–Uganda relations =

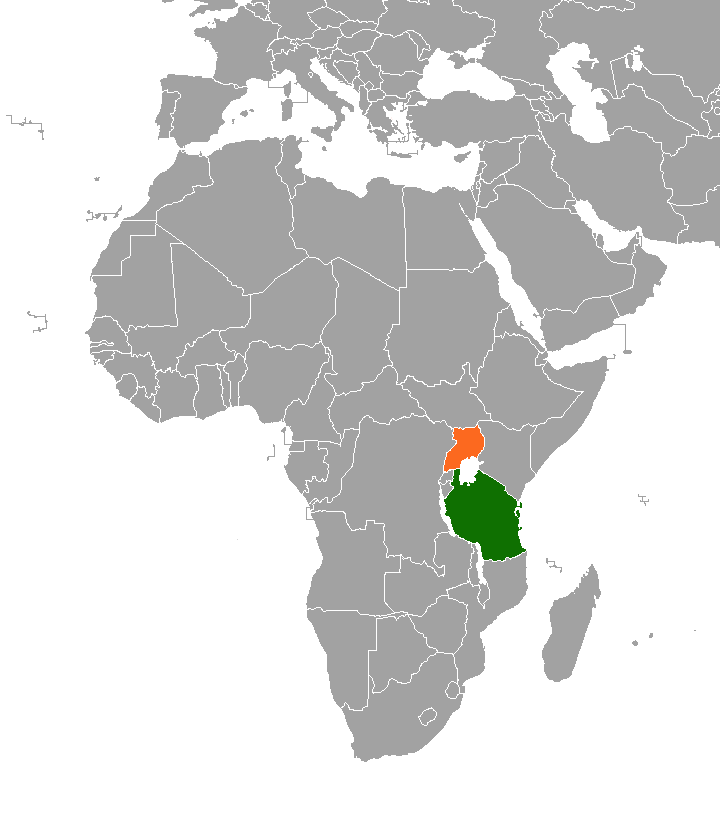
- Tanzania: Uganda

Tanzania–Uganda relations are bilateral relations between Tanzania and Uganda. Tanzania is a strategic partner of Uganda in many areas, particularly trade, security, education, agriculture and energy. Uganda and Tanzania enjoy warm, cordial and fraternal relations dating back to the 1960s when the two countries gained their independence from the British Empire. Both countries are members of the African Union, Commonwealth of Nations, Non-Aligned Movement and Group of 77. Tanzania and Uganda are both founding members of the East African Community.

== History ==
=== Uganda–Tanzania War ===
Relations between Tanzania and Uganda had been strained for several years before the war started in 1978. After Idi Amin seized power in a military coup in 1971, the Tanzanian leader Julius Nyerere offered sanctuary to Uganda's ousted president, Milton Obote. After various coup attempts were made on Amin from Tanzania; Uganda declared a state of war against Tanzania, and sent troops to invade and annex part of the Kagera region of Tanzania, which Amin claimed belonged to Uganda. The war ended in April 1979 with Tanzania being victorious. Tanzania had to foot the bill for the war entirely by itself and the war brought further strain to the economy. Uganda completed paying the debt of the war in 2007.

== Trade and Economy ==
Trade between Uganda and Tanzania is very healthy and in 2013 Tanzania exported $62.2 million worth of goods to Uganda, mainly machinery, agriculture products and medicines. The Balance of trade is very even and in 2013 Uganda exported $62.6 million worth of goods to Tanzania, mainly corn and telecommunication equipment.

=== Tanzania-Uganda pipeline ===
The Uganda–Tanzania Crude Oil Pipeline (UTCOP) is a proposed pipeline to transport crude oil from Uganda's oil fields to Tanga, Tanzania, a port on the Indian Ocean. It is expected that construction will start in August 2016 and last three years at a budgeted cost of US$4 billion. The three oil companies currently prospecting or oil in Uganda, namely France's Total E&P Uganda, China's CNOOC and UK's Tullow Oil are expected to fund the pipeline. In March 2016, the Daily Monitor newspaper reported that Total E&P is prepared to spend US$4 billion (approx. USh13.52 trillion), to fund construction of this pipeline.

== Diplomatic missions ==
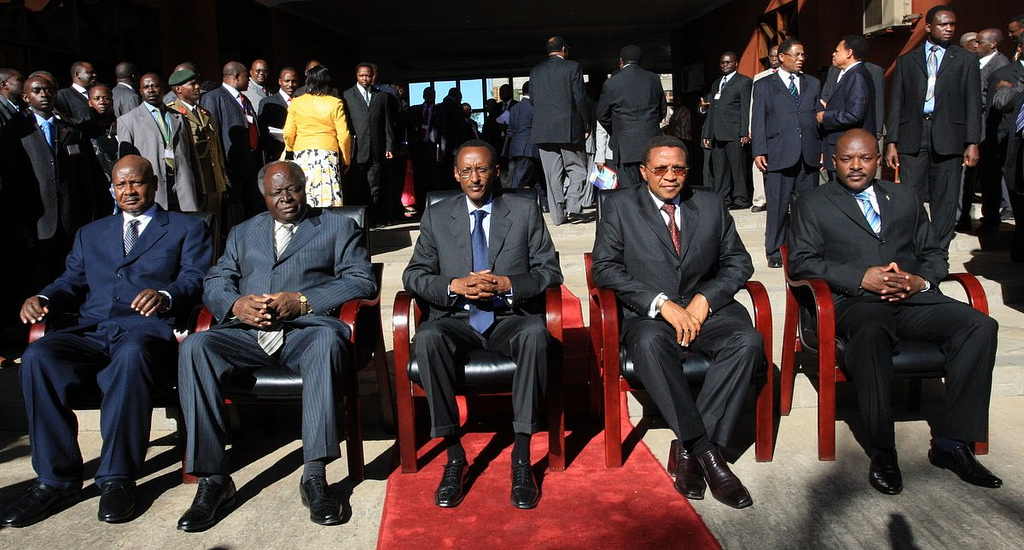
East African Community Head of States. Yoweri Museveni on the left and Jakaya Kikwete fourth from the left.

Tanzania has a High Commission in Kampala and Uganda also has a High Commission in Dar es Salaam.

=== State Visits ===
All former presidents of Tanzania have made various state visits to Uganda and the same can be said for the Ugandan counterparts. Various visits between the leaders also occurs at the annual East African Community summits.

== Resident diplomatic missions ==
- Tanzania has a high commission in Kampala.
- Uganda has a high commission in Dar es Salaam.

== See also ==
- Ugandans in Tanzania
