= List of roads in Tanzania =

List of national road network of Tanzania

National Routes in Tanzania
- Trunk Road Network

System information
- Length: 36,760 km (22,840 mi)
- Formed: 2007

Highway names
- Trunk routes: Txx
- Regional routes: Rxx

The following is a list of national roads in Tanzania, under the jurisdiction of the Tanzania National Roads Agency (TANROADS). The list is not exhaustive. As part of the 2007 Roads Act in Tanzania, National roads were classified into two categories, Trunk Roads and Regional Roads. The total road network in Tanzania as of December 2022 is 181,190 km (112,590 mi), of which 36,760 km (22,840 mi) are classified as National Roads (Trunk &; Regional) and 144,429 km (89,744 mi) as District Roads (Collector, Feeder and Urban roads). District roads are under the responsibility of the President's Office Regional Administration and Local Government (PORALG) through the Tanzania Rural and Urban Roads Agency (TARURA). Before 1980, Tanzania shared the same highway numbering system as Kenya, following the dissolution of the East African Community, the country renamed its roads to the A and B numbering system still available on some out dated maps.

== National roads ==
=== Trunk Roads ===
Road No.	Span	Length	Map	Condition	Under Construction	Image
T1	Dar es Salaam – Morogoro – Iringa – Makambako – Mbeya – Tunduma – Zambia	924 km (574 mi)		Entirely Paved		
T2	Chalinze – Segera – Moshi – Arusha – Namanga – Kenya	644 km (400 mi)		Entirely Paved		
T3	Morogoro – Dodoma – Singida – Nzega – Rusumo – Rwanda	1,097 km (682 mi)		Entirely Paved		
T4	Kenya – Sirari – Mwanza – Biharamulo – Mutukula – Uganda	765 km (475 mi)		Entirely Paved		
T5	Iringa – Dodoma – Arusha	680 km (420 mi)		Entirely Paved		
T6	Mtwara – Songea – Makambako	931 km (578 mi)		Entirely Paved		
T7	Dar es Salaam – Lindi – Mingoyo	477 km (296 mi)		Entirely Paved		
T8	Mbeya– Tabora – Nzega – Kisesa	881 km (547 mi)		Partially Paved		
T9	Biharamulo – Kasulu – Uvinza – Mpanda – Sumbawanga – Tunduma – Zambia	1,014 km (630 mi)		Partially Paved		
T10	Mbeya (Uyole) – Kasumulu – Malawi	104 km (65 mi)		Entirely Paved		
T11	Kasulo – Kabanga – Burundi	98 km (61 mi)		Entirely Paved		
T12	Songea – Mbamba Bay	164 km (102 mi)		Entirely Paved		
T13	Segara – Tanga – Horohoro - Kenya	137 km (85 mi)		Entirely Paved		
T14	Singida – Babati	160 km (99 mi)		Entirely Paved		
T15	Himo – Holili – Kenya	15 km (9.3 mi)		Entirely Paved		
T16	Mikumi – Ifakara – Songea					
T17	Makuyuni – Musoma	431 km (268 mi)		Partially Paved		
T18	Manyoni – Tabora – Kidahwe	645 km (401 mi)		Paved in patches		
T19	Rusesa – Kigoma – Manyovu – Burundi	131 km (81 mi)		Entirely Paved		
T20	Sumbawanga – Kasesya – Zambia	94 km (58 mi)		Partially Paved		
T21	Himo – Marangu – Tarakea – Kenya	62 km (39 mi)		Entirely Paved		
T22	Mkiwa – Itigi – Rungwa	219 km (136 mi)		Unpaved		
T23	Mpanda – Ipole	261 km (162 mi)		Entirely Paved		
T26	Dar es Salaam – Bagamoyo	64 km (40 mi)		Entirely Paved		
T27	Mpemba – Isongole	48 km (30 mi)		Unpaved		
T28	Ibanda – Kyela	14 km (8.7 mi)				
T30	Mafinga – Mufindi	44 km (27 mi)				
T31	Nundu – Mlangali – Ludewa – Manda	210 km (130 mi)				
T35	Bagamoyo – Msata	62 km (39 mi)		Entirely Paved		
T36	Lamadi – Mwigumbi	171 km (106 mi)		Entirely Paved		
T37	Shinyanga – Mwanyomba – Karatu	325 km (202 mi)				
T38	Nyakasanza – Kyaka	180 km (110 mi)				
T39	Uganda – Murungo – Nyakahanga	113 km (70 mi)				
T40	Songea – Mkwenda – Mozambique	124 km (77 mi)				
T41	Mtai – Kasanga	63 km (39 mi)				
T42	Mangaka – Mtambaswala – Mozambique	72 km (45 mi)				

== See also ==
- Transport in Tanzania
