= Lindi Historic Town =

National Historic Site of Tanzania

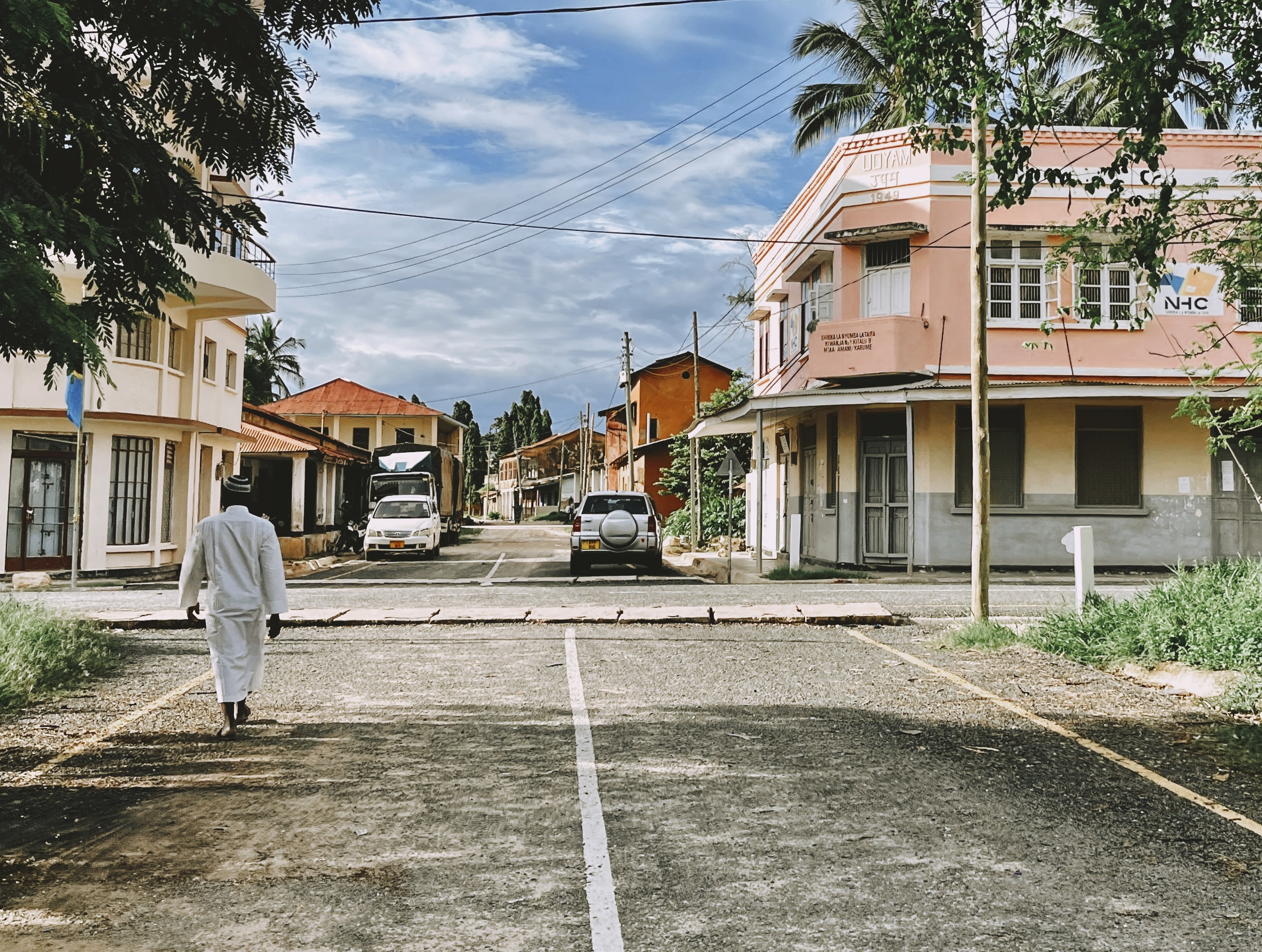
- Street Scene in Lindi Historic Town

- Location within Tanzania
- 9°59′49″S 39°42′52″E
- Type: Settlement
- Cultures: Swahili
- Location: Lindi Municipal District, Lindi Region, Tanzania

History
- Built: 11th century CE

Site notes
- Architectural styles: Swahili, Islamic & Architecture of Germany
- Condition: Endangered
- Owner: Tanzanian Government
- Management: Antiquities Division, Ministry of Natural Resources and Tourism

National Historic Sites of Tanzania
- Official name: Lindi Historic Town
- Type: Cultural

Lindi Historic Town (Mji wa kale wa Lindi in Swahili) is a historic area located in the present day small city of Lindi, Lindi Municipal District of Lindi Region in Tanzania. The historic part of town covers the wards of Makonde, Ndoro, Mikundi, Mitandi and Msanjihili wards. The area has building from Swahili, Arab and German tradition reflecting the settlement's history.

Lindi was a major part of the Swahili civilisation, whom established the town in the eleventh century and conducted trade along the coast with other people living near the Indian Ocean. The Swahili town's previous name has never been documented. It may have been called for the native Mwinyi's forefathers. The Omanis ruled the local populace and used the region to trade and transport ivory and slaves to the international market.

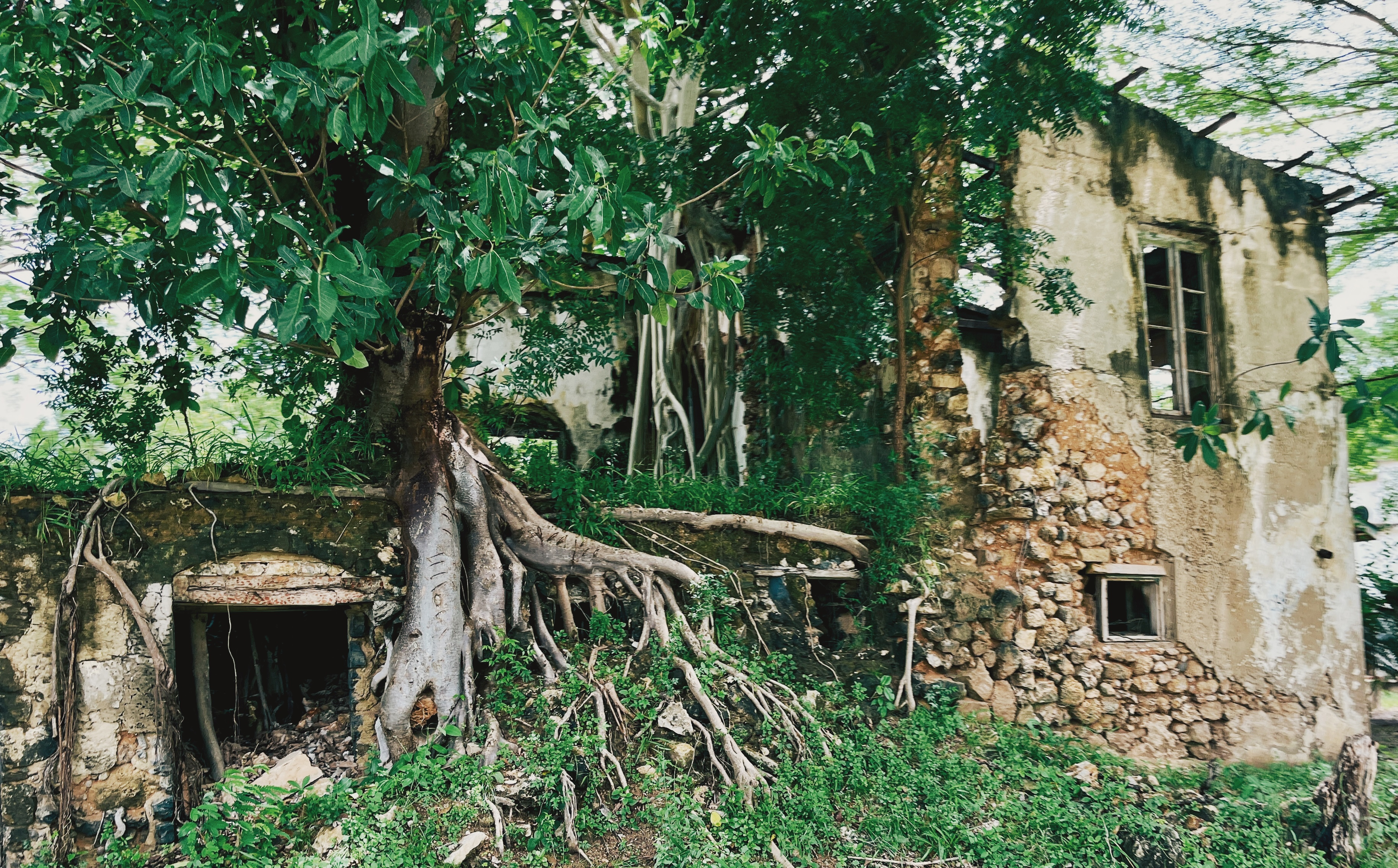
Old German building ruin from the late 19th Century.

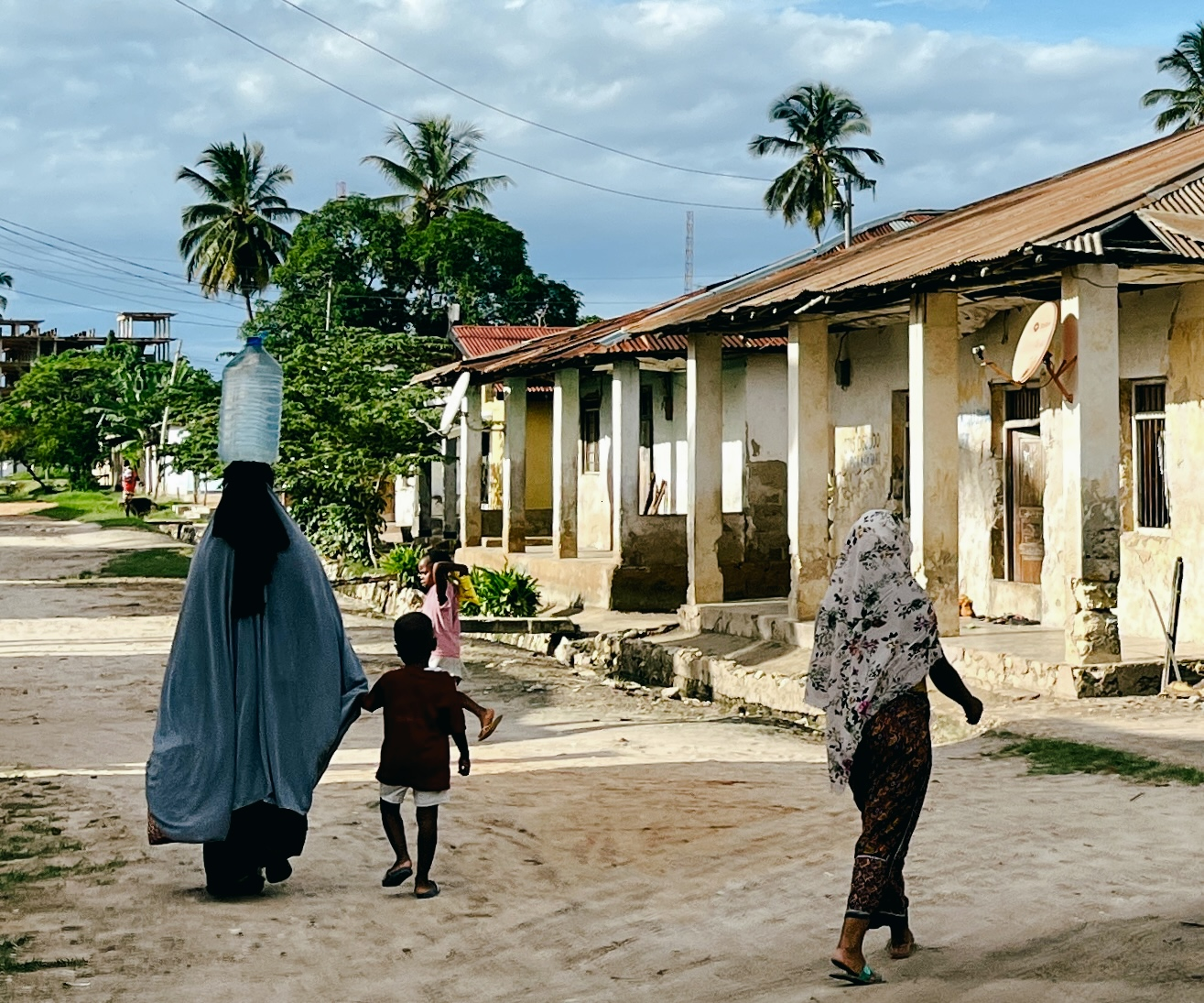
Street scene in Msanjihili ward with traditional Swahili homes.

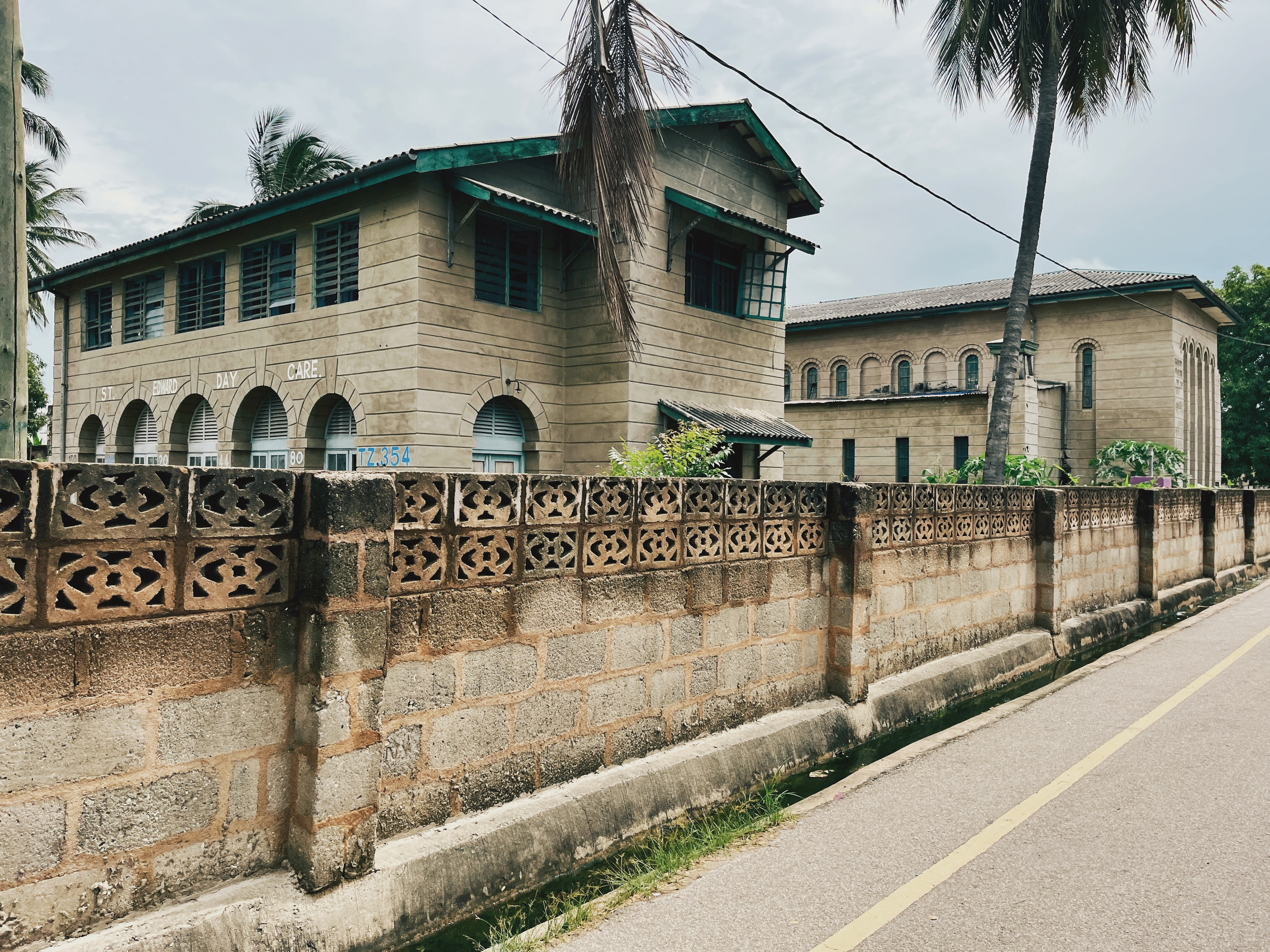
Old building in Msanjihili ward, Lindi town.
