= T13 road (Tanzania) =

Road in Tanzania

Trunk Road T13
- The T13 is indicated in red.

Route information
- Maintained by TANROADS
- Length: 137 km (85 mi)

Major junctions
- South end: T2 in Segera
- North end: A7 at the Kenyan border at Horohoro

Location
- Country: Tanzania
- Regions: Tanga
- Major cities: Segera, Tanga, Horohoro

Highway system
- Transport in Tanzania
| ← T12 | → T14 |

The T13 is a Trunk road in Tanzania. The road runs from the T2 major trunk road junction in Segera and heads west towards Tanga. The road then connects the Tanga to the Kenyan border at Horohoro. The A7 road from the Kenyan border connects to Mombasa. The roads as it is approximately 137 km (85 mi). The road is entirely paved.

== Route ==
=== Namanga ===
At the border the T2 highway intersects with the A2 road in Kenya, both countries operate a one stop border post.

== See also ==
- Transport in Tanzania
- List of roads in Tanzania
