= T5 road (Tanzania) =

Road in Tanzania

Trunk Road T5
- The T5 is indicated in yellow.

Route information
- Maintained by TANROADS
- Length: 680 km (420 mi)

Major junctions
- South end: T1 in Iringa
- T3 in Dodoma; T14 in Babati; T17 in Makuyuni
- North end: T2 in Arusha

Location
- Country: Tanzania
- Regions: Iringa, Dodoma, Manyara, Arusha
- Major cities: Iringa, Dodoma, Kondoa, Babati, Arusha

Highway system
- Transport in Tanzania
← T4	→ T6

The T5 is a Trunk road in Tanzania. The road runs from Iringa in the Southern Highlands through Dodoma to Arusha. In the south the T5 connects with the T1 road to go towards Zambia and in the north, In Arusha the T5 connects intersects with the T2 road to connect the Kenyan border. This section of the highway forms the majority of the Cairo–Cape Town Highway. The roads as it is approximately 680 km (420 mi). The road is entirely paved.

== See also ==
- Transport in Tanzania
- List of roads in Tanzania
