= T7 road (Tanzania) =

Road in Tanzania

Trunk Road T7
- The T7 is indicated in yellow.

Route information
- Maintained by TANROADS
- Length: 447 km (278 mi)

Major junctions
- North end: T24 in Dar es Salaam
- South end: T6 in Mingoyo

Location
- Country: Tanzania
- Regions: Dar es Salaam, Pwani, Lindi
- Major cities: Dar es Salaam, Kilwa, Lindi

Highway system
- Transport in Tanzania
← T6	→ T8

The T7 is a Trunk road in Tanzania. The road runs from the city center of Dar es Salaam at the Kamata Intersection, south along the Indian Ocean to Lindi. The road then extends an additional 27 km (17 mi) to Mingoyo, where the road connects to the T6 road. The roads as it is approximately 447 km (278 mi). The road is entirely paved.

== See also ==
- Transport in Tanzania
- List of roads in Tanzania
