= T10 road (Tanzania) =

Road in Tanzania

Trunk Road T10
- The T10 is indicated in yellow.

Route information
- Maintained by TANROADS
- Length: 104 km (65 mi)

Major junctions
- North end: T1 in Uyole
- T3 in Lusahunga; T3 in Nyakanazi; T28 in Ibanda
- South end: M1 at Malawi Border at Kasumulu

Location
- Country: Tanzania
- Regions: Mbeya
- Major cities: Uyole, Tukuyu, Kasumulu

Highway system
- Transport in Tanzania
← T9	→ T11

The T10 is a Trunk road in Tanzania. The road runs from Uyole in Mbeya in the southern highlands and heds south to connect to the Malawin border. THis is the only trunk road that connects to Malawi from Tanzania. The roads as it is approximately 104 km (65 mi). The road is entirely paved. The road connects to a One Stop Border post in Malawi with the Songwe M1 Bridge that crosses the river between Malawi and Tanzania.

== See also ==
- Transport in Tanzania
- List of roads in Tanzania
