= Kabanga =

Kabanga may refer to:

- Kabanga, Burundi
- Kabanga, Kigoma Region
- Kabanga, Kagera Region
- Cikabanga, a pidgin of isiZulu with influence from iciBemba
