= T11 road (Tanzania) =

Road in Tanzania

Trunk Road T11
- The T11 is indicated in yellow.

Route information
- Maintained by TANROADS
- Length: 98 km (61 mi)

Major junctions
- East end: T3 in Kasulo
- West end: RN6 at Burundi Border at Kabanga

Location
- Country: Tanzania
- Regions: Kagera
- Major cities: Ngara, Kabanga

Highway system
- Transport in Tanzania
← T10	→ T12

The T11 is a Trunk road in Tanzania. The road runs from Kasulo in Kagera and heads west towards Burundi. This is one of two trunk roads that connect Tanzania to Burundi. The roads as it is approximately 98 km (61 mi). The road is entirely paved. The Kabanga Nickel Project exploration activities are being conducted alongside this trunk road.

== See also ==
- Transport in Tanzania
- List of roads in Tanzania
