= T12 road (Tanzania) =

Trunk road in Tanzania

Trunk Road T12
- The T12 is indicated in yellow.

Route information
- Maintained by TANROADS
- Length: 164 km (102 mi)

Major junctions
- East end: T6 in Songea
- T40 in Songea
- West end: Mbamba Bay Port, Mbamba Bay

Location
- Country: Tanzania
- Regions: Ruvuma
- Major cities: Songea, Mbinga, Mbamba Bay

Highway system
- Transport in Tanzania
← T11	→ T13

The T12 is a Trunk road in Tanzania. The road runs from Songea west towards Mbamba Bay. The roads as it is approximately 164 km (102 mi). The road is part of the Mtwara Development Corridor and the road is entirely paved.

== See also ==
- Transport in Tanzania
- List of roads in Tanzania
