= T17 road (Tanzania) =

Road in Tanzania

Trunk Road T17
- The T17 is indicated in yellow.

Route information
- Maintained by TANROADS
- Length: 431 km (268 mi)

Major junctions
- South end: T5 in Makuyuni
- T4 in Makutano
- North end: Musoma City Center

Location
- Country: Tanzania
- Regions: Arusha, Simiyu, Mara

Highway system
- Transport in Tanzania
| ← T16 | → T18 |

The T17 is a Trunk road in Tanzania. The road runs from the T5 major trunk road junction at Makuyuni and heads north towards Musoma. The roads as it is approximately 431 km (268 mi). The road is mostly not paved. The route goes through the Ngorongoro Conservation Area as well as the Serengeti National Park. The highway was in much controversy as the Government of Tanzania aimed to pave the road, with many campaigns mostly in Europe against the move to protect the ecosystem of the national parks. After much pressure, the government agreed to improve the regional roads instead and provide an alternative route around the park. The T37 trunk road was drawn up as the alternative to connect the communities in the northern regions.

== See also ==
- Transport in Tanzania
- List of roads in Tanzania
