= T15 road (Tanzania) =

Road in Tanzania

Trunk Road T15
- The T15 is indicated in yellow.

Route information
- Maintained by TANROADS
- Length: 15 km (9.3 mi)

Major junctions
- East end: T2 in Himo
- T21 in Himo
- West end: A23 at the Kenyan border at Holili

Location
- Country: Tanzania
- Regions: Kilimanjaro
- Major cities: Himo

Highway system
- Transport in Tanzania
← T14	→ T16

The T16 is a Trunk road in Tanzania. The road runs from the T2 major trunk road junction at Himo and heads east towards Holili at the Kenyan Border. The roads as it is approximately 15 km (9.3 mi). The road is entirely paved.

== See also ==
- Transport in Tanzania
- List of roads in Tanzania
