= T27 road (Tanzania) =

Road in Tanzania

Trunk Road T27
- The T27 is indicated in yellow.

Route information
- Maintained by TANROADS
- Length: 48 km (30 mi)

Major junctions
- West end: T1 in Mpemba
- East end: Isongole

Location
- Country: Tanzania
- Regions: Songwe

Highway system
- Transport in Tanzania
← T26	→ T28

The T27 is a Trunk road in Tanzania. The road runs west from Mpemba near the Tunduma border towards Isongole. The roads as it is approximately 48 km (30 mi). The road is not paved.

== See also ==
- Transport in Tanzania
- List of roads in Tanzania
