= T6 road (Tanzania) =

Road in Tanzania

Trunk Road T6
- The T6 is indicated in yellow.

Route information
- Maintained by TANROADS
- Length: 931 km (578 mi)

Major junctions
- East end: Mtwara City
- T7 in Mingoyo; T42 in Mangaka; T12 in Songea
- West end: T1 in Makambako

Location
- Country: Tanzania
- Regions: Mtwara, Lindi, Ruvuma, Njombe
- Major cities: Mtwara, Masasi, Tunduru, Songea, Njombe, Makambako

Highway system
- Transport in Tanzania
← T5	→ T7

The T6 is a Trunk road in Tanzania. The road runs from the city center of Mtwara along the southern border of Tanzania to Songea and then connecting to the T1 road at Makambako. The roads as it is approximately 931 km (578 mi). The road is entirely paved. This is the only Trunk Road that connects to Mtwara city and Mtwara Port. The T6 provides an important road link as part of the Mtwara Development Corridor.

== See also ==
- Transport in Tanzania
- List of roads in Tanzania
