= T28 road (Tanzania) =

Road in Tanzania

Trunk Road T28

Route information
- Maintained by TANROADS
- Length: 48 km (30 mi)

Major junctions
- West end: T1 in Kasumulu
- East end: Kyela

Location
- Country: Tanzania
- Regions: Songwe

Highway system
- Transport in Tanzania
← T26	→ T28

The T28 is a Trunk Road in Tanzania. The road serves as a brief but crucial link between Kasumulu and Kyela, located in the border region with Malawi, providing access to a ferry terminal on the shores of Lake Malawi. Spanning a total distance of 25 kilometers, theroad plays a role in connecting the surrounding areas to the lake's transportation network.

== Route ==
The T28 road branches off from the T10 near Kasumulu, just a short distance from the Malawi border. The paved road runs alongside the border, paralleling the Malawi frontier, until it reaches the shores of Lake Malawi. The paved section concludes in the village of Kyela, giving way to a dirt road that continues to the lake's edge, where a small harbor in Itungi offers a connection to the water.

== History ==
Lake Malawi, also known as Lake Nyasa, has long served as a transportation artery for the region. The Lake Nyasa Port Authority, situated in Itungi, oversees the port that primarily accommodates passenger traffic and a limited amount of cargo. Historically, the port's significance led to the establishment of the B345 road, which connected the port to the surrounding network. Later, this road was re-designated as the T28, solidifying its importance in the regional transportation infrastructure.

== See also ==
- Transport in Tanzania
- List of roads in Tanzania
