= T21 road (Tanzania) =

Road in Tanzania

Trunk Road T21
- The T21 is indicated in yellow.

Route information
- Maintained by TANROADS
- Length: 62 km (39 mi)

Major junctions
- North end: T15 in Himo
- South end: C102 at the Kenyan border in Tarakea

Location
- Country: Tanzania
- Regions: Kilimanjaro

Highway system
- Transport in Tanzania
← T20	→ T22

The T21 is a trunk road in Tanzania. The road runs north from Himo towards the Kenyan border in Tarakea. The roads as it is approximately 62 km (39 mi). The road is entirely paved.

== See also ==
- Transport in Tanzania
- List of roads in Tanzania
