= T2 road (Tanzania) =

Road in Tanzania

Trunk Road T2
- The T2 is indicated in yellow.

Route information
- Maintained by TANROADS
- Length: 644 km (400 mi)

Major junctions
- South end: T1 in Chalinze
- T35 in Msata; T13 in Segera; T15 in Himo; T35 in Arusha
- North end: A2 at the Kenyan border at Namanga

Location
- Country: Tanzania
- Regions: Pwani, Tanga, Kilimanjaro, Arusha
- Major cities: Chalinze, Moshi, Arusha, Namanga

Highway system
- Transport in Tanzania
← T1	→ T3

The T2 is a Trunk road in Tanzania. The road runs from the major highway junction in Chalinze where the Trunk Road T1 and T2 intersect all the way to Kenyan border at Namanga. The route is approximately 644 km (400 mi). The road is a major road artery between Dar es Salaam and the cities in the North of Tanzania. The road is entirely paved. The road is a busy road link between the two largest economies in the East African Community & is part of the Cape to Cairo Road.

== Route ==
=== Namanga ===
At the border the T2 highway intersects with the A2 road in Kenya, both countries operate a one stop border post.

== See also ==
- Transport in Tanzania
- List of roads in Tanzania
