= T11 =

T11 may refer to:

== Anatomy ==
- Eleventh thoracic vertebra
- Thoracic spinal nerve 11

== Aviation ==
- Marathon T.11, a British trainer aircraft
- T-11 Kansan, an American trainer aircraft
- T-11 parachute, used by the United States Army
- Yap International Airport, in the Federated States of Micronesia

== Rail and transit ==
=== Lines ===
- Île-de-France tramway Line 11 Express, France
- Line 11, part of the Blue Line (Stockholm Metro), in Sweden

=== Locomotives ===
- Prussian T 11, a steam locomotive

=== Stations ===
- Arahata Station, Nagoya, Aichi Prefecture, Japan
- Dainichi Station, Osaka, Japan
- Kayabachō Station, Tokyo, Japan
- Kikusui Station, Sapporo, Hokkaido, Japan
- Sanjō Keihan Station, Kyoto, Japan
- Sanuki-Shirotori Station, Higashikagawa, Kagawa Prefecture, Japan

== Other uses ==
- T11 (classification), a disability sport classification
- T11 (satellite)
- Autovía T-11, a highway in Catalonia, Spain
- DEC T-11, a microprocessor
- Estonian national road 11
- T11 road (Tanzania)
- German torpedo boat T11
- Gilbern T11, a concept car
- Robbins Island language
- Simca-Gordini T11, a racing car
- Soyuz T-11, a 1984 space mission
- T11 torpedo
- T11, on the TORRO scale of tornado intensity
