= Kabanga, Kigoma Region =

- Location in Tanzania
- Coordinates: 04°30′43.4″S 30°06′22.0″E
- Country: Tanzania
- Region: Kigoma Region
- Elevation: 4,183 ft (1,275 m)

Population
  - Total: 10,300
- Time zone: UTC+3 (East Africa Time)

Kabanga is one of a number of towns in Tanzania with this name. This is the one in Kigoma Region.

== Transport ==
You can get to Kabanga travelling first to the city of Kigoma by airplane or railway from Dar es Salaam. Then by road, driving 90 kilometres (56 mi) from Kigoma to Kasulu and 7 kilometres (4.3 mi) more from Kasulu to Kabanga village.

== See also ==
- Kabanga Nickel Project
- Kabanga, Kagera Region
