= T20 road (Tanzania) =

Road in Tanzania

Trunk Road T20
- The T20 is indicated in yellow.

Route information
- Maintained by TANROADS
- Length: 94 km (58 mi)

Major junctions
- North end: T9 in Sumbawanga
- T41 in Mtai
- South end: M1 at the Zambian border in Kasesya

Location
- Country: Tanzania
- Regions: Rukwa
- Major cities: Sumbawanga

Highway system
- Transport in Tanzania
← T19	→ T21

The T20 is a Trunk road in Tanzania. The road runs south from Sumbawanga towards the Zambian border in Kasesya. The roads as it is approximately 94 km (58 mi). The road is not entirely paved. In October 2023, the president of Tanzania, Samia Suluhu Hassan on a state visit to Zambia expressed desire from the government to upgrade this route and the border post with Zambia.

== See also ==
- Transport in Tanzania
- List of roads in Tanzania
