= T26 road (Tanzania) =

Road in Tanzania

Trunk Road T26
- The T26 is indicated in yellow.

Route information
- Maintained by TANROADS
- Length: 64 km (40 mi)

Major junctions
- South end: T1 in Dar es Salaam
- North end: T35 in Bagamoyo

Location
- Country: Tanzania
- Regions: Dar es Salaam, Pwani
- Major cities: Dar es Salaam, Bagamoyo

Highway system
- Transport in Tanzania
← T25	→ T27

The T26 is a Trunk road in Tanzania. The road runs north from Dar es Salaam at the T1 Trunk Road junction towards Bagamoyo ending at the city center where it connects to the T35 Trunk Road. The roads as it is approximately 64 km (40 mi). The road is paved.

== See also ==
- Transport in Tanzania
- List of roads in Tanzania
