= T27 =

T27 may refer to:ppp

== Aviation ==
- Embraer T-27 Tucano, a Brazilian trainer
- Horizon Airport (El Paso, Texas)
- Junkers T 27, German experimental trainer

== Other uses ==
- T-27, a Soviet tankette
- T27 road (Tanzania)
- German torpedo boat T27
- Gordon Murray Automotive T.27, a city car
- Shōwachō Station (Kagawa), in Takamatsu, Kagawa, Japan
- T27 Armored Car, an American prototype armored car
- Tennōji Station, in Osaka, Japan
