= Mbanja, Lindi =

Ward in Lindi Municipal District, Lindi Region

Mbanja Kata ya Mbanja (Swahili)
- Ward
- Kata ya Mbanja, Wilaya ya Lindi Manispaa
- Location within Tanzania
- Country: Tanzania
- Region: Lindi Region
- District: Lindi Municipal District

Area
  - Total: 213 km^{2} (82 sq mi)
- Elevation: 48 m (157 ft)

Population (2012)
  - Total: 3,188
  - Density: 15.0/km^{2} (38.8/sq mi)
- Tanzanian Postal Code: 65118

Mbanja is an administrative ward in Lindi Municipal District of Lindi Region in Tanzania. The ward covers an area of 213 km^{2} (82 sq mi), and has an average elevation of 48 m (157 ft). According to the 2012 census, the ward has a total population of 3,188. Mbanja ward is named after Mbanja river.
