= Kirushya =

Ward in Ngara, Kagera, Tanzania

Kirushya Kata ya Kirushya
- Ward
- Location within Tanzania
- Coordinates: 2.450428°S 30.542775°E
- Country: Tanzania
- Region: Kagera Region
- District: Ngara District
- Ward: Kirushya

Population (2016)
  - Total: 12,062
- Time zone: UTC+3 (EAT)

Kirushya is one of 17 wards/divisions of Ngara District, in the Kagera Region of Tanzania. It is located near Burundi and Rwanda. The name itself comes from a word for "tedious"; the area is largely a dry hill, and the scarcity of water forced residents to travel long distances for resupply. Such a journey is tedious, hence the name. In the 2017 government plans, 41% of Kirushya's population had clean water.

In 2016 the Tanzania National Bureau of Statistics report there were 12,062 people in the ward, from 10,628 in 2012.

== Villages ==
The ward has 23 villages.

- Mubisumulizi
- Murubila
- Kumuyaga
- Mumakombe
- Kumutumba
- Kasange Nyabigogo
- Kasange kati
- Mukahama
- Gwamanyagu
- Kirushya Mwisenga
- Kamilo
- Kirushya
- Rugenge
- Masale
- Nyamigango
- Mwivuza Murugarama A
- Murugarama B
- Mundaro A
- Mundaro B
- Mubayange A
- Mubayange B
- Mukabenga
- Mumaliza
