= Wailes, Lindi =

Ward in Lindi Municipal District, Lindi Region

Wailes Kata ya Wailes (Swahili)
- Ward
- Kata ya Wailes, Wilaya ya Lindi Manispaa
- Location within Tanzania
- Country: Tanzania
- Region: Lindi Region
- District: Lindi Municipal District

Area
  - Total: 0.9 km^{2} (0.35 sq mi)
- Elevation: 29 m (95 ft)

Population (2012)
  - Total: 2,812
  - Density: 3,100/km^{2} (8,100/sq mi)
- Tanzanian Postal Code: 65109

Wailes is an administrative ward in Lindi Municipal District of Lindi Region in Tanzania. The ward covers an area of 0.9 km^{2} (0.35 sq mi), and has an average elevation of 29 m (95 ft). According to the 2012 census, the ward has a total population of 2,812.
