= Mtanda =

Ward in Lindi Municipal District, Lindi Region

Mtanda Kata ya Mtanda (Swahili)
- Ward
- Kata ya Mtanda, Wilaya ya Lindi Manispaa
- Location within Tanzania
- Country: Tanzania
- Region: Lindi Region
- District: Lindi Municipal District

Area
  - Total: 34.5 km^{2} (13.3 sq mi)
- Elevation: 34 m (112 ft)

Population (2012)
  - Total: 5,683
  - Density: 165/km^{2} (427/sq mi)
- Tanzanian Postal Code: 65112

Mtanda is an administrative ward in Lindi Municipal District of Lindi Region in Tanzania. The ward covers an area of 34.5 km^{2} (13.3 sq mi), and has an average elevation of 34 m (112 ft). According to the 2012 census, the ward has a total population of 5,683.
