= Chikonji =

Ward in Lindi Region, Tanzania

Chikonji Kata ya Chikonji (Swahili)
- Ward
- Kata ya Chikonji, Wilaya ya Lindi Manispaa
- Location within Tanzania
- Country: Tanzania
- Region: Lindi Region
- District: Lindi Municipal District

Area
  - Total: 207.2 km^{2} (80.0 sq mi)
- Elevation: 80 m (260 ft)

Population (2012)
  - Total: 5,354
  - Density: 25.84/km^{2} (66.92/sq mi)
- Tanzanian Postal Code: 65117

Chikonji is an administrative ward in Lindi Municipal District of Lindi Region in Tanzania. The ward covers an area of 207.2 km^{2} (80.0 sq mi), and has an average elevation of 80 m (260 ft). According to the 2012 census, the ward has a total population of 5,354.
