= Ndoro =

Ward in Lindi Municipal District, Lindi Region

Ndoro Kata ya Ndoro (Swahili)
- Ward
- Kata ya Ndoro, Wilaya ya Lindi Manispaa
- Location within Tanzania
- Country: Tanzania
- Region: Lindi Region
- District: Lindi Municipal District

Area
  - Total: 0.1005 km^{2} (0.0388 sq mi)
- Elevation: 25 m (82 ft)

Population (2012)
  - Total: 1,836
  - Density: 18,270/km^{2} (47,320/sq mi)
- Tanzanian Postal Code: 65103

Ndoro is an administrative ward in Lindi Municipal District of Lindi Region in Tanzania. The ward covers an area of 0.1005 km^{2} (0.0388 sq mi), and has an average elevation of 25 m (82 ft). According to the 2012 census, the ward has a total population of 1,836. Ndoro ward is where the Lindi Municipal District Offices are located.
