= Tandangongoro =

Ward in Lindi Municipal District, Lindi Region

Tandangongoro Kata ya Tandangongoro (Swahili)
- Ward
- Kata ya Tandangongoro, Wilaya ya Lindi Manispaa
- Location within Tanzania
- Country: Tanzania
- Region: Lindi Region
- District: Lindi Municipal District

Area
  - Total: 165 km^{2} (64 sq mi)
- Elevation: 352 m (1,155 ft)

Population (2012)
  - Total: 3,550
  - Density: 21.5/km^{2} (55.7/sq mi)
- Tanzanian Postal Code: 65116

Tandangongoro is an administrative ward in Lindi Municipal District of Lindi Region in Tanzania. The ward covers an area of 165 km^{2} (64 sq mi), and has an average elevation of 352 m (1,155 ft). According to the 2012 census, the ward has a total population of 3,550.
