= Ng'apa =

Ward in Lindi Municipal District, Lindi Region

Ng'apa Kata ya Ng'apa (Swahili)
- Ward
- Kata ya Ng'apa, Wilaya ya Lindi Manispaa
- Location within Tanzania
- Country: Tanzania
- Region: Lindi Region
- District: Lindi Municipal District

Area
  - Total: 91.6 km^{2} (35.4 sq mi)
- Elevation: 64 m (210 ft)

Population (2012)
  - Total: 7,760
  - Density: 84.7/km^{2} (219/sq mi)
- Tanzanian Postal Code: 65115

Ng'apa is an administrative ward in Lindi Municipal District of Lindi Region in Tanzania. The ward covers an area of 91.6 km^{2} (35.4 sq mi), and has an average elevation of 64 m (210 ft). According to the 2012 census, the ward has a total population of 7,760.
