= Nachingwea, Lindi Municipal District =

Ward in Lindi Municipal District, Lindi Region

Nachingwea Kata ya Nachingwea (Swahili)
- Ward
- Kata ya Nachingwea, Wilaya ya Lindi Manispaa
- Location within Tanzania
- Country: Tanzania
- Region: Lindi Region
- District: Lindi Municipal District

Area
  - Total: 0.8 km^{2} (0.31 sq mi)
- Elevation: 38 m (125 ft)

Population (2012)
  - Total: 3,176
  - Density: 4,000/km^{2} (10,000/sq mi)
- Tanzanian Postal Code: 65110

Nachingwea is an administrative ward in Lindi Municipal District of Lindi Region in Tanzania. The ward covers an area of 0.8 km^{2} (0.31 sq mi), and has an average elevation of 38 m (125 ft). According to the 2012 census, the ward has a total population of 3,176.
