= Mwenge, Lindi =

Ward in Lindi Municipal District, Lindi Region

Mwenge Kata ya Mwenge (Swahili)
- Ward
- Kata ya Mwenge, Wilaya ya Lindi Manispaa
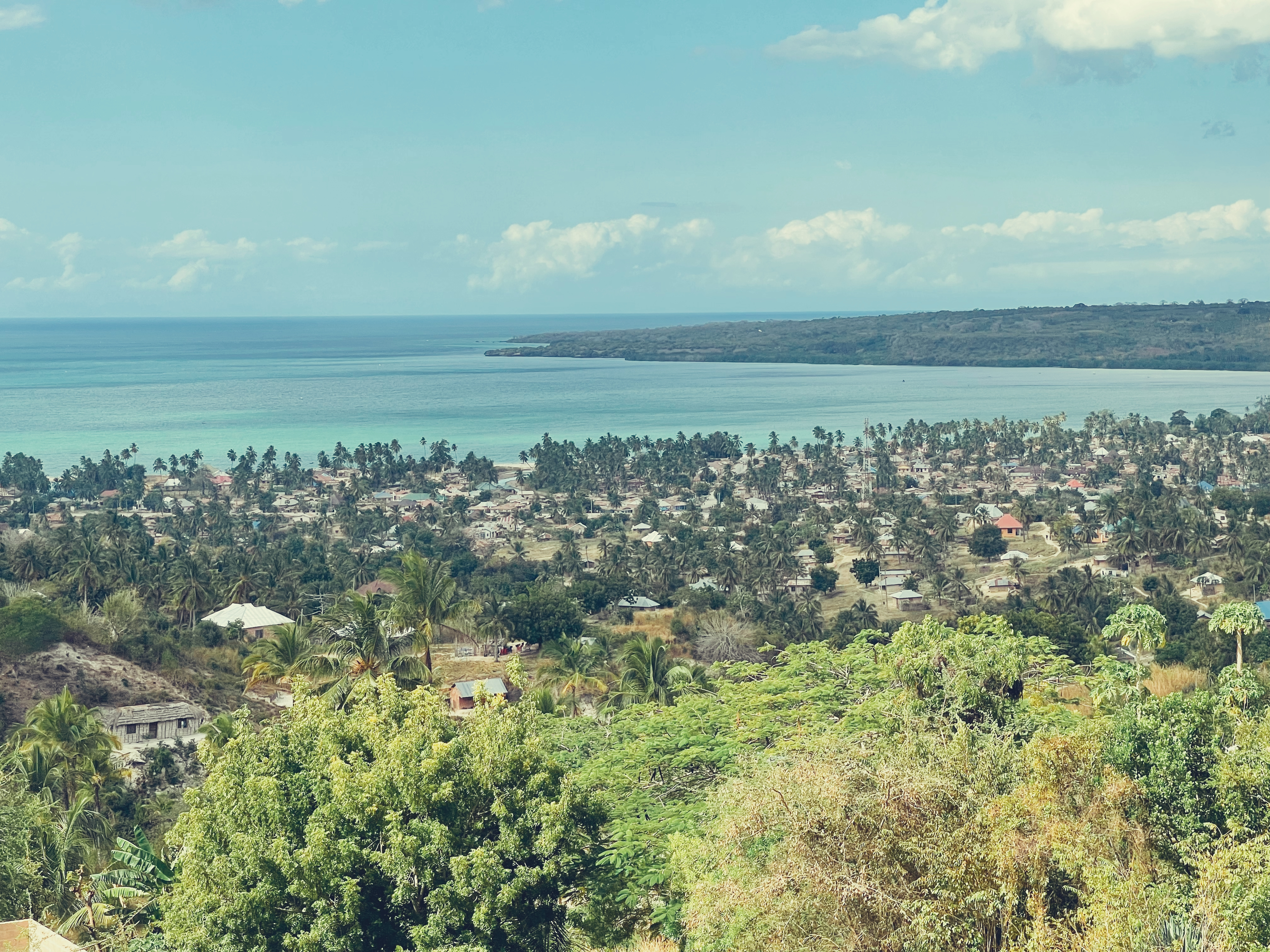
- View from Mwenge Ward, Lindi Municipal District

- Location within Tanzania
- Country: Tanzania
- Region: Lindi Region
- District: Lindi Municipal District

Area
  - Total: 1.2 km^{2} (0.46 sq mi)
- Elevation: 43 m (141 ft)

Population (2012)
  - Total: 2,808
  - Density: 2,300/km^{2} (6,100/sq mi)
- Tanzanian Postal Code: 65107

Mwenge is an administrative ward in Lindi Municipal District of Lindi Region in Tanzania. The ward covers an area of 1.2 km^{2} (0.46 sq mi), and has an average elevation of 43 m (141 ft). According to the 2012 census, the ward has a total population of 2,808.
