= Rahaleo, Lindi =

Ward in Lindi Municipal District, Lindi Region

Rahaleo Kata ya Rahaleo (Swahili)
- Ward
- Kata ya Rahaleo, Wilaya ya Lindi Manispaa
- Location within Tanzania
- Country: Tanzania
- Region: Lindi Region
- District: Lindi Municipal District

Area
  - Total: 0.5680 km^{2} (0.2193 sq mi)
- Elevation: 34 m (112 ft)

Population (2012)
  - Total: 2,111
  - Density: 3,717/km^{2} (9,626/sq mi)
- Tanzanian Postal Code: 65106

Rahaleo is an administrative ward in Lindi Municipal District of Lindi Region in Tanzania. The ward covers an area of 0.5680 km^{2} (0.2193 sq mi), and has an average elevation of 34 m (112 ft). According to the 2012 census, the ward has a total population of 2,111.
