= Rasbura =

Ward in Lindi Municipal District, Lindi Region

Rasbura Kata ya Rasbura (Swahili)
- Ward
- Kata ya Rasbura, Wilaya ya Lindi Manispaa
- Location within Tanzania
- Country: Tanzania
- Region: Lindi Region
- District: Lindi Municipal District

Area
  - Total: 64.2 km^{2} (24.8 sq mi)
- Elevation: 59 m (194 ft)

Population (2012)
  - Total: 6,599
  - Density: 103/km^{2} (266/sq mi)
- Tanzanian Postal Code: 65111

Rasbura is an administrative ward in Lindi Municipal District of Lindi Region in Tanzania. The ward covers an area of 64.2 km^{2} (24.8 sq mi), and has an average elevation of 59 m (194 ft). According to the 2012 census, the ward has a total population of 6,391.
