= Keza =

Ward in Ngara, Kagera, Tanzania

Keza Kata ya Keza
- Ward
- Location within Tanzania Location within Africa
- Coordinates: 2.754°S 30.682°E
- Country: Tanzania
- Region: Kagera Region
- District: Ngara District
- Ward: Keza

Population (2016)
  - Total: 10,810
- Time zone: UTC+3 (EAT)
- Postcode: 35716

Keza is a ward in Ngara District of the Kagera Region in west-central Tanzania. In 2016 the Tanzania National Bureau of Statistics report there were 10,810 people in the ward, from 9,525 in 2012.

== Villages ==
The ward has 15 villages.

- Keza
- Rukira
- Nyakabanda
- Kibirizi
- Rubanga I
- Kazingati
- Rubanga II
