= Matopeni, Lindi =

Ward in Lindi Municipal District, Lindi Region

Matopeni Kata ya Matopeni (Swahili)
- Ward
- Kata ya Matopeni, Wilaya ya Lindi Manispaa
- Location within Tanzania
- Country: Tanzania
- Region: Lindi Region
- District: Lindi Municipal District

Area
  - Total: 1 km^{2} (0.39 sq mi)
- Elevation: 35 m (115 ft)

Population (2012)
  - Total: 3,578
  - Density: 3,600/km^{2} (9,300/sq mi)
- Tanzanian Postal Code: 65108

Matopeni is an administrative ward in Lindi Municipal District of Lindi Region in Tanzania. The ward covers an area of 1 km^{2} (0.39 sq mi), and has an average elevation of 35 m (115 ft). According to the 2012 census, the ward has a total population of 3,578.
