= Ngara District =

District of Kagera Region, Tanzania

Ngara District Wilaya ya Ngara
- District
- Ngara District of Kagera Region
- Coordinates: 2.633333°S 30.683333°E
- Country: Tanzania
- Region: Kagera Region

Government
  - Type: Council
  - Body: Ngara District Council
  - District Commissioner: Mathias Julius Kahabi (TPDF)
  - District Secretary: Vedastus Tibaijuka
  - Chairman of Council: Wilbard Bambala

Area
  - Total: 3,305 km^{2} (1,276 sq mi)
- Elevation: 1,800 m (5,900 ft)

Population (2022)
  - Total: 383,092
  - Density: 115.9/km^{2} (300.2/sq mi)
- Time zone: UTC+3 (EAT)
- Area code: 028
- Website: District Website

Ngara District is one of the eight districts of the Kagera Region of Tanzania. It is bordered to the north by Karagwe District, to the east by Biharamulo District, to the south by the Kigoma Region, to the northeast by Muleba District and to the west by the countries of Rwanda and Burundi.

According to the 2012 Tanzania National Census, the population of the Ngara District was 320,056, from 334,409 in 2002, and 159,546 in 1988, with an estimated population of 365,661 in 2017. The population density is 110 inhabitants per square kilometre (280/sq mi). There are 22 wards, 75 villages, and 389 suburbs in Ngara.

== Geography ==
Ngara is located in northwestern Tanzania near the borders of Rwanda and Burundi. Its elevation is approximately 6,000 feet (1,800 m) and is considered to be in the highlands of Tanzania. The district covers and area of 3,305 square kilometres (1,276 sq mi).

Ngara has four seasons: two dry seasons from June to September and January to February with two rainy seasons from October to December and from March to May. During dry seasons there are sometimes strong winds/hazy air and temperatures vary between 18 and 30 °C (64 and 86 °F), depending on the time of day or night. During the rainy seasons, sudden and heavy downpours may occur daily, lasting from a few minutes to several hours. The rain is sometimes associated with strong winds, floods, mud, fog and temperatures may range between 12 and 26 °C (54 and 79 °F).

== Language ==
The local language in Ngara is Kihangaza, which is very similar to Rundi and Kinyarwanda, the languages of Rwanda and Burundi. Although Tanzania’s national and official languages are Swahili and English, usage in Ngara District is, however, rather limited to official functions, offices, institutions of higher learning and a few other places. Generally, English is understood on a limited scale in the market, and Swahili much more so.

== Economy ==
The primary occupation is subsistence farming and livestock rearing. Local crops include bananas, passion fruit, papaya, groundnuts, beans, coffee, maize, cassava and a variety of vegetables. The local population's livestock is mostly cattle, goats and chickens.

== Administrative subdivisions ==
=== Constituencies ===
For parliamentary elections, Tanzania is divided into constituencies. As of the 2010 elections Ngara District had one constituency:

- Ngara Constituency

However the recent state council meetings in 2014 has been put forward an argumentation to divide the district into two constituencies which will be North Ngara and South Ngara. This has been agreed for or the case after the allocation of new Region which in the coming years the district will be sharing one region with the other two District from Kigoma region which are Kakonko and Kibondo joining Ngara and Biharamulo from Kagera Region to form a new Region with its headquarters at Nyakanazi the recent and popular known junction joining Kigoma region with Kagera Region.

=== Wards ===
As of 2002, Ngara District was administratively divided into 22 wards:

- Bukiriro
- Bugarama (Ngara)
- Kabanga
- Kanazi
- Kasulo
- Keza
- Kibimba
- Kirushya
- Mabawe
- Mbuba
- Muganza
- Mugoma
- Murukulazo
- Murusagamba
- Ngara Mjini
- Ntobeye
- Nyakisasa
- Nyamiyaga
- Rulenge
- Rusumo

== Refugees from Rwanda and Burundi in Ngara ==
Ngara District received several hundred thousand refugees from Burundi beginning in 1993, and Rwanda in 1994 during the Great Lakes Refugee Crisis. The refugees fled the aftermath of the 1994 Rwandan genocide and Civil War. In this context, Ngara District received attention from around the world, including the funding of a large refugee relief operation funded by the United Nations High Commission for Refugees, World Food Programme, and International donors. The crisis brought coverage from CNN, Time Magazine, and many other press outlets covering the refugee crisis. Starting in October 1993 civil unrest in Burundi led also to refugee flight into Ngara District, where they were resettled at Lukole Refugee Camp. A number of refugee camps were established to accommodate the Rwandan refugees, the largest camp which was Benaco, which was opened to accommodate over 200,000 refugees from Rwanda in early May 1994. Other camps were opened in Ngara District in 1994 at Lumasi for Rwandans, and Lukole for Burundians. Other small camps for Burundians were opened in 1996. Benaco and the other camps for Rwandans were closed in late 1996, when the Tanzanian military, in cooperation with the governments of Rwanda, and the international donors supporting the camps, forcibly repatriated several hundred thousand. However, smaller numbers of refugees have remained in the district since that time, particularly Burundians. Lukole camp for Burundians is the best known of these camps. Ngara District has a long history of receiving refugees. The first refugees arrived in the early 1960s, when Tutsi refugees fled from Rwanda following that country's independence. They were resettled in Ngara for over twenty years, before returning to Rwanda after 1994.
