= Mikumbi =

Ward in Lindi Municipal District, Lindi Region

Mikumbi Kata ya Mikumbi (Swahili)
- Ward
- Kata ya Mikumbi, Wilaya ya Lindi Manispaa
- Location within Tanzania
- Country: Tanzania
- Region: Lindi Region
- District: Lindi Municipal District

Area
  - Total: 0.3 km^{2} (0.12 sq mi)
- Elevation: 25 m (82 ft)

Population (2012)
  - Total: 2,006
  - Density: 6,700/km^{2} (17,000/sq mi)
- Tanzanian Postal Code: 65104

Mikumbi is an administrative ward in Lindi Municipal District of Lindi Region in Tanzania. The ward covers an area of 0.3 km^{2} (0.12 sq mi), and has an average elevation of 25 m (82 ft). According to the 2012 census, the ward has a total population of 2,006.
