= T14 road (Tanzania) =

Road in Tanzania

Trunk Road T14
- The T14 is indicated in yellow.

Route information
- Maintained by TANROADS
- Length: 160 km (99 mi)

Major junctions
- West end: T3 in Singida
- East end: T5 in Babati

Location
- Country: Tanzania
- Regions: Singida, Manyara
- Major cities: Singida, Babati

Highway system
- Transport in Tanzania
→ T15

The T14 is a Trunk road in Tanzania. The road runs from the T3 major trunk road junction in Singida and heads east towards Babati. The roads as it is approximately 160 km (99 mi). The road is entirely paved.

== See also ==
- Transport in Tanzania
- List of roads in Tanzania
