= Jamhuri, Lindi =

Ward in Lindi Municipal District, Lindi Region

Jamhuri Kata ya Jamhuri (Swahili)
- Ward
- Kata ya Jamhuri, Wilaya ya Lindi Manispaa
- Location within Tanzania
- Country: Tanzania
- Region: Lindi Region
- District: Lindi Municipal District

Area
  - Total: 65.1 km^{2} (25.1 sq mi)
- Elevation: 28 m (92 ft)

Population (2012)
  - Total: 6,571
  - Density: 101/km^{2} (261/sq mi)
- Tanzanian Postal Code: 65113

Jamhuri is an administrative ward in Lindi Municipal District of Lindi Region in Tanzania. The ward covers an area of 65.1 km^{2} (25.1 sq mi), and has an average elevation of 28 m (92 ft). According to the 2012 census, the ward has a total population of 6,571.
