= T1 road (Tanzania) =

Road in Tanzania

Trunk Road T1
- The T1 is indicated in yellow.

Route information
- Maintained by TANROADS
- Length: 924 km (574 mi)

Major junctions
- East end: T24 in Dar es Salaam
- T2 in Chalinze; T3 in Morogoro; T5 in Iringa; T6 in Makambako; T10 in Uyole; T8 in Mbeya; T27 in Mpemba; T9 in Tunduma
- West end: T2 at the Zambian border at Tunduma

Location
- Country: Tanzania
- Regions: Dar es Salaam, Pwani, Morogoro, Iringa, Njobme, Mbeya, Songwe
- Major cities: Dar es Salaam, Chalinze, Morogoro, Iringa, Mbeya, Tunduma

Highway system
- Transport in Tanzania
| → T2 |

The T1 is a Trunk road in Tanzania. The road runs from the intersection of Morogoro Road/Bibi Titi Mohamed St in Dar es Salaam all the way to Zambian border at Tunduma. The route is approximately 924 km (574 mi). The T1 in its entirety forms the Tanzanian part of the Tanzam Highway. The road is a major road artery between Dar es Salaam and the cities in the Southern Highlands of Tanzania. The road is entirely paved.

== See also ==
- Transport in Tanzania
- List of roads in Tanzania
