= Mitandi =

Ward in Lindi Municipal District, Lindi Region

Mitandi Kata ya Mitandi (Swahili)
- Ward
- Kata ya Mitandi, Wilaya ya Lindi Manispaa
- Location within Tanzania
- Country: Tanzania
- Region: Lindi Region
- District: Lindi Municipal District

Area
  - Total: 0.1666 km^{2} (0.0643 sq mi)
- Elevation: 29 m (95 ft)

Population (2012)
  - Total: 2,515
  - Density: 15,100/km^{2} (39,100/sq mi)
- Tanzanian Postal Code: 65105

Mitandi is an administrative ward in Lindi Municipal District of Lindi Region in Tanzania. The ward covers an area of 0.1666 km^{2} (0.0643 sq mi), and has an average elevation of 29 m (95 ft). According to the 2012 census, the ward has a total population of 2,515.
