= Makonde, Lindi =

Ward in Lindi Municipal District, Lindi Region

Makonde Kata ya Makonde (Swahili)
- Ward
- Kata ya Makonde, Wilaya ya Lindi Manispaa
- Location within Tanzania
- Country: Tanzania
- Region: Lindi Region
- District: Lindi Municipal District

Area
  - Total: 0.1537 km^{2} (0.0593 sq mi)
- Elevation: 22 m (72 ft)

Population (2012)
  - Total: 1,091
  - Density: 7,098/km^{2} (18,380/sq mi)
- Tanzanian Postal Code: 65101

Makonde is an administrative ward in Lindi Municipal District of Lindi Region in Tanzania. The ward covers an area of 0.1537 km^{2} (0.0593 sq mi), and has an average elevation of 22 m (72 ft). According to the 2012 census, the ward has a total population of 1,091.
