= Mlangali =

- Town and ward
- Location in Tanzania
- Coordinates: 9°46′52″S 34°31′21″E
- Country: Tanzania
- Region: Njombe
- District: Ludewa

Population (2002)
  - Total: 16,260
- Time zone: UTC+3 (EAT)

Mlangali is an administrative ward in Ludewa District, Njombe Region, Tanzania. According to the 2002 census, the ward has a total population of 16,260.
