= Msinjahili =

Ward in Lindi Municipal District, Lindi Region

Msinjahili Kata ya Msinjahili (Swahili)
- Ward
- Kata ya Msinjahili, Wilaya ya Lindi Manispaa
- Location within Tanzania
- Country: Tanzania
- Region: Lindi Region
- District: Lindi Municipal District

Area
  - Total: 125.3 km^{2} (48.4 sq mi)
- Elevation: 23 m (75 ft)

Population (2012)
  - Total: 6,391
  - Density: 51.01/km^{2} (132.1/sq mi)
- Tanzanian Postal Code: 65102

Msinjahili is an administrative ward in Lindi Municipal District of Lindi Region in Tanzania. The ward covers an area of 125.3 km^{2} (48.4 sq mi), and has an average elevation of 23 m (75 ft). According to the 2012 census, the ward has a total population of 6,391.
