= Mbamba Bay =

Mbamba Bay Mbampa
- Town
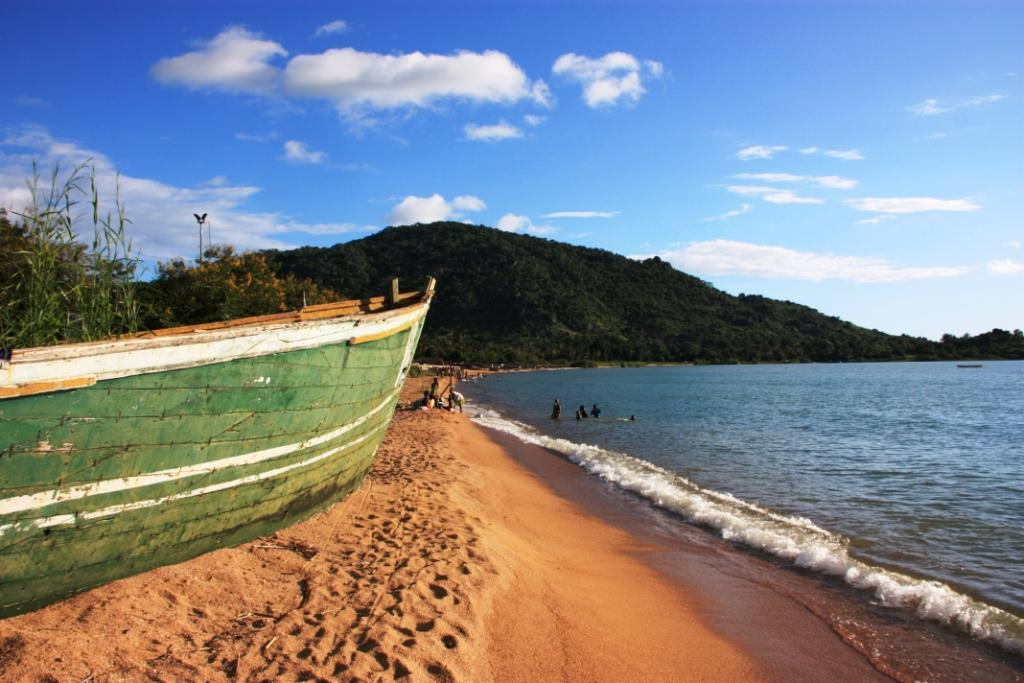

- Location in Tanzania
- Coordinates: 11°17′0″S 034°46′18″E
- Country: Tanzania
- Region: Ruvuma Region
- District: Mbinga District
- Elevation: 471 m (1,545 ft)
- Time zone: UTC+3 (EAT)
- UFI: -2568444

Mbamba Bay is a town in western Tanzania, lying on the eastern shore of Lake Malawi/Lake Nyasa.

== Port ==
Mbamba Bay has an indentation in the otherwise straight profile of the lake and may be a potential port.

== Transport ==
In October 2007, it was proposed to build a branch railway from Liganga via Mchuchuma to Mbamba Bay. Mbamba Bay is linked with Nkhata Bay in Malawi by motorized dhow. The A19 links it with Mtwara, Tanzania, on the east coast.

== See also ==
- Transport in Tanzania
- Mtwara Development Corridor
