= A7 road (Kenya) =

Road in Kenya

A5 Road

Route information
- Maintained by Kenya National Highways Authority

Major junctions
- North end: Gazi
- South end: Mombasa

Location
- Country: Kenya

Highway system
- Transport in Kenya

The A7 road is a road in Kenya that runs along the Indian Ocean coastline. It spans 428 kilometers, starting at the Tanzanian border and passing through the port city of Mombasa before ending in Lamu. The road connects various locations along the coast.

== Route ==
The A7 highway originates at the Tanzanian border, where it connects with the Tanzanian T13 road from Dar es Salaam. From there, it proceeds as a modern, paved road along the coast to Mombasa, passing through a relatively densely populated rural area characterized by flat terrain and tropical vegetation. In Mombasa, the road becomes a multi-lane city road, crossing an estuary via the Nyali Bridge, before narrowing to a single lane and continuing north along the Indian Ocean coastline.

The route traverses various landscapes, including a bay near Kilifi, and forms a boundary between cultivated savannah and undeveloped forest areas. The road passes through the coastal town of Malindi and continues north, following the coast along Ungwana Bay before turning inland near Garsen. The final stretch to Lamu is also paved, winding through a cultivated rural area in the coastal plain. The A7 terminates just before reaching Lamu, which is located on an island without a bridge connection.

== History ==
The southern segment of the A7 highway, spanning 110 kilometers from the Tanzanian border to Mombasa, was initially designated as the A14. The subsequent sections, from Mombasa to Garsen and Garsen to Lamu, were previously numbered as the B8 and C112, respectively. In 2016, these routes were consolidated into the A7 motorway, a more significant transportation artery.

Historically, the original A14 has been a vital road along Kenya's east coast, and as such, it has been fully asphalted. However, a notable limitation has been the absence of a fixed crossing over the Kilindini Harbour in Mombasa. To address this, a western bypass of Mombasa was under construction in 2021, undertaken by a Japanese company. While a bridge over the harbour would be beneficial, it would require a substantial structure with a clearance height of 60 meters to accommodate the port's significant traffic. A tunnel is not feasible due to the harbour's depth.

In Mombasa, a pontoon bridge over Tudor Creek was initially opened in 1931, followed by a fixed box bridge with 2x3 lanes in 1980, constructed by Japan. An additional bridge is currently being built in Mombasa, with construction commencing in 2021. Between 2017 and 2021, the northernmost section of the A7, from Garsen to Lamu, was paved, completing the entire motorway.
