= Lindi Municipal Council =

District of Lindi Region, Tanzania

Lindi Municipal
- District
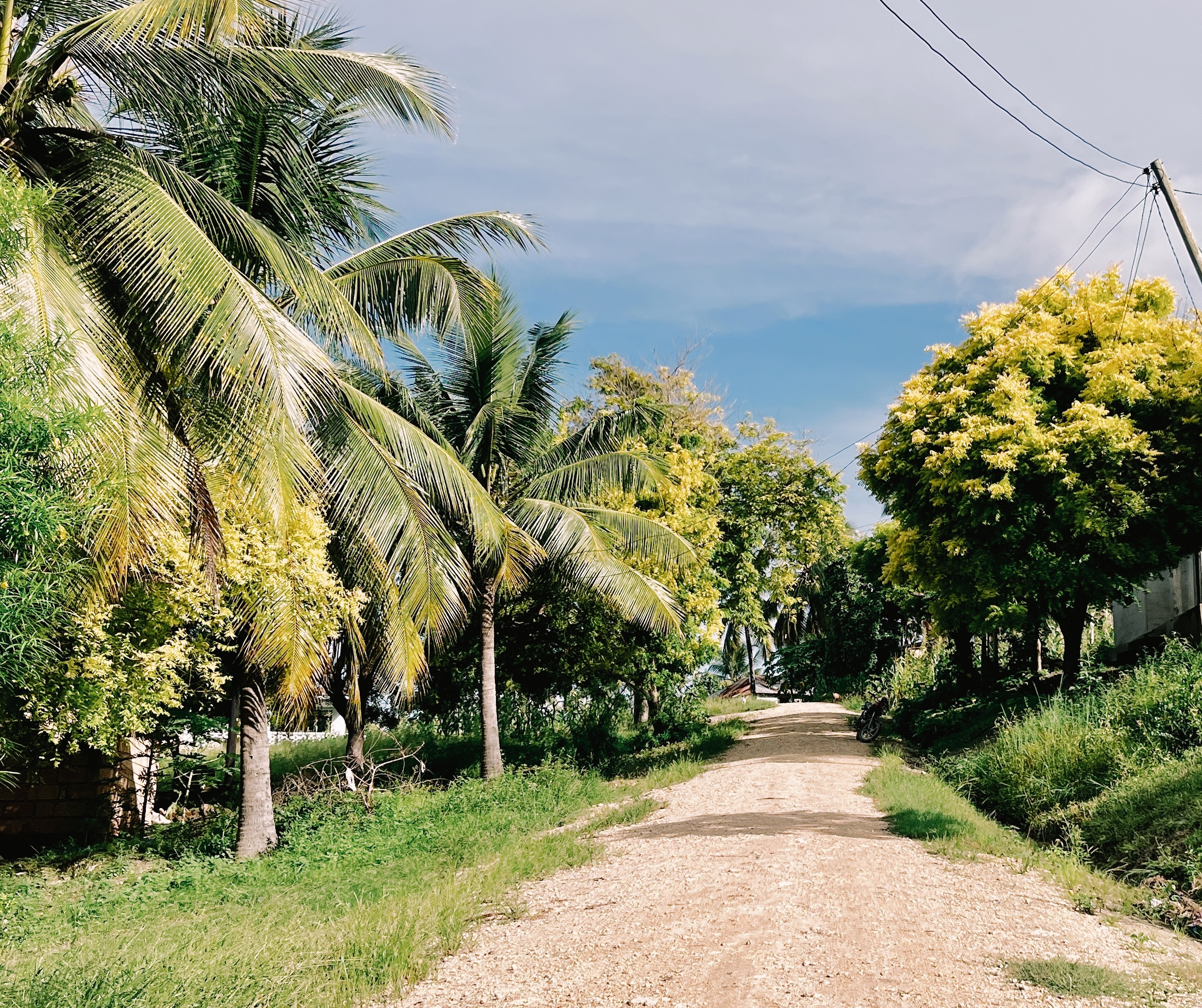
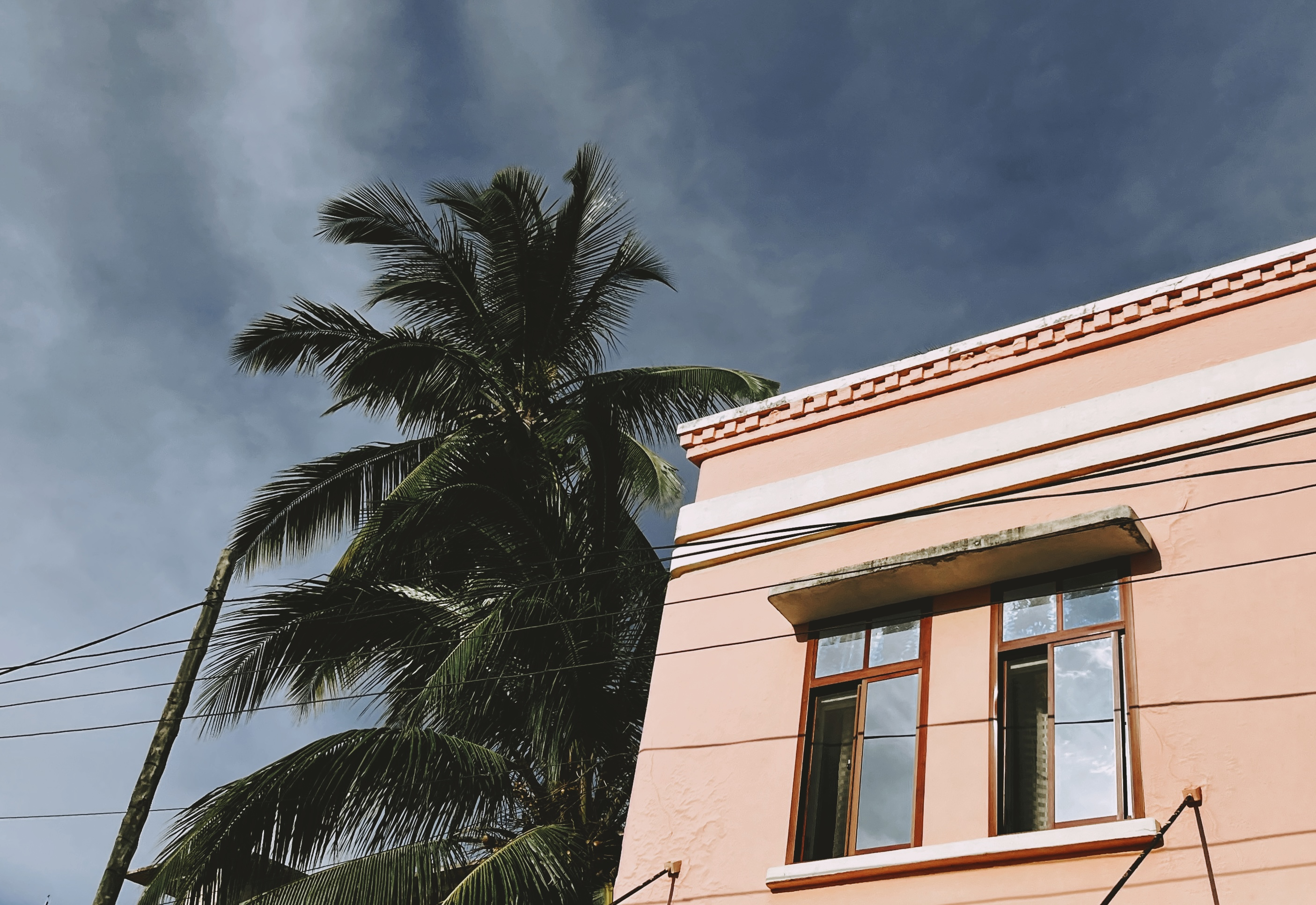
- From top to bottom: Scene of Lindi Town & Street Scene in Nachingwea ward, Lindi Municipal
- Nickname: Lindi's coconut district
- Lindi Municipal District in Lindi
- Coordinates: 9°58′55.2″S 39°41′59.28″E
- Country: Tanzania
- Region: Lindi Region
- Named for: Lindi
- Capital: Ndoro, Lindi

Area
  - Total: 1,060 km^{2} (410 sq mi)
  - Rank: 6th in Lindi

Population (2012)
  - Total: 78,841
  - Rank: 6th in Lindi
  - Density: 74.4/km^{2} (193/sq mi)
- Demonym: District Lindian

Ethnic groups
  - Settler: Swahili
  - Native: Mwera & Makonde people
- Website: https://lindimc.go.tz/

Lindi Municipal District is one of the eight administrative districts of Lindi Region in Tanzania. The district covers an area of 1,064 km^{2} (411 sq mi).The district is comparable in size to the land area of the nation state of Sao Tome and Principe. It is entirely bordered on land by Lindi District and its faces the Indian Ocean to the east. Lindi Municipal District hosts the region's capital is located in the ward of Ndoro in the town of Lindi. According to the 2012 census, the district has a total population of 78,841.

== Administrative Divisions ==
The Lindi District is administratively divided into 18 wards.

=== Wards ===
1. Chikonji
2. Jamhuri
3. Makonde
4. Matopeni
5. Mbanja
6. Mikumbi
7. Mingoyo
8. Mitandi
9. Msanjahili

1. Mtanda
2. Mwenge
3. Nachingwea
4. Ndoro
5. Ng'apa
6. Rahaleo
7. Rasbura
8. Tandangongoro
9. Wailes

== Education & Health ==
As of 2022, there were 89 Schools in Lindi Municipal District, 72 of are primary schools and 17 are secondary schools. In Terms of Healthcare facilities, as of 2022 Lindi district is home to 36 healthcare facilities namely; 32 clinics and 4 heath centers.
