= Isongole =

Ward in Mbeya, Tanzania

- Ward
- Location within Tanzania
- Coordinates: 9.478°S 33.182°E
- Country: Tanzania
- Region: Mbeya Region
- District: Rungwe District
- Ward: Isongole

Government
  - Type: Council
  - District Executive Director: Loema Peter Isaya
  - MP: Saul Henry Amon
  - Chairman: Ezekiel Mwakota
  - Councilor: Lauwrence Nyasa Mtwango

Population (2016)
  - Total: 7,930
- Time zone: UTC+3 (EAT)
- Postcode: 53534
- Area code: 025
- Website: District Website

Isongole is an administrative ward in Rungwe District, Mbeya Region, Tanzania. In 2016 the Tanzania National Bureau of Statistics report there were 7,930 people in the ward, from 18,689 in 2012 before it was split up.

== Villages and hamlets ==
The ward has 6 villages, and 22 hamlets.

- Idweli
  - Ijela
  - Itenki
  - Iwawa
  - Katumba
  - Sogeza
- Isyonje
  - Isyonje A
  - Isyonje B
  - Kenya
  - Mbwiga
- Mbeye 1
  - Nyaga
  - Tembela
- Ndwati
  - Bwawani
  - Igalula
  - Ndowela
- Ngumbulu
  - Ikambaku
  - Ipyela A
  - Ipyela B
  - Muungano
  - Nsanga
- Unyamwanga
  - Nguga
  - Shoga
  - Uholo
