= Uyole =

Ward of Mbeya Region, Tanzania

Uyole Kata ya Uyole
- Ward
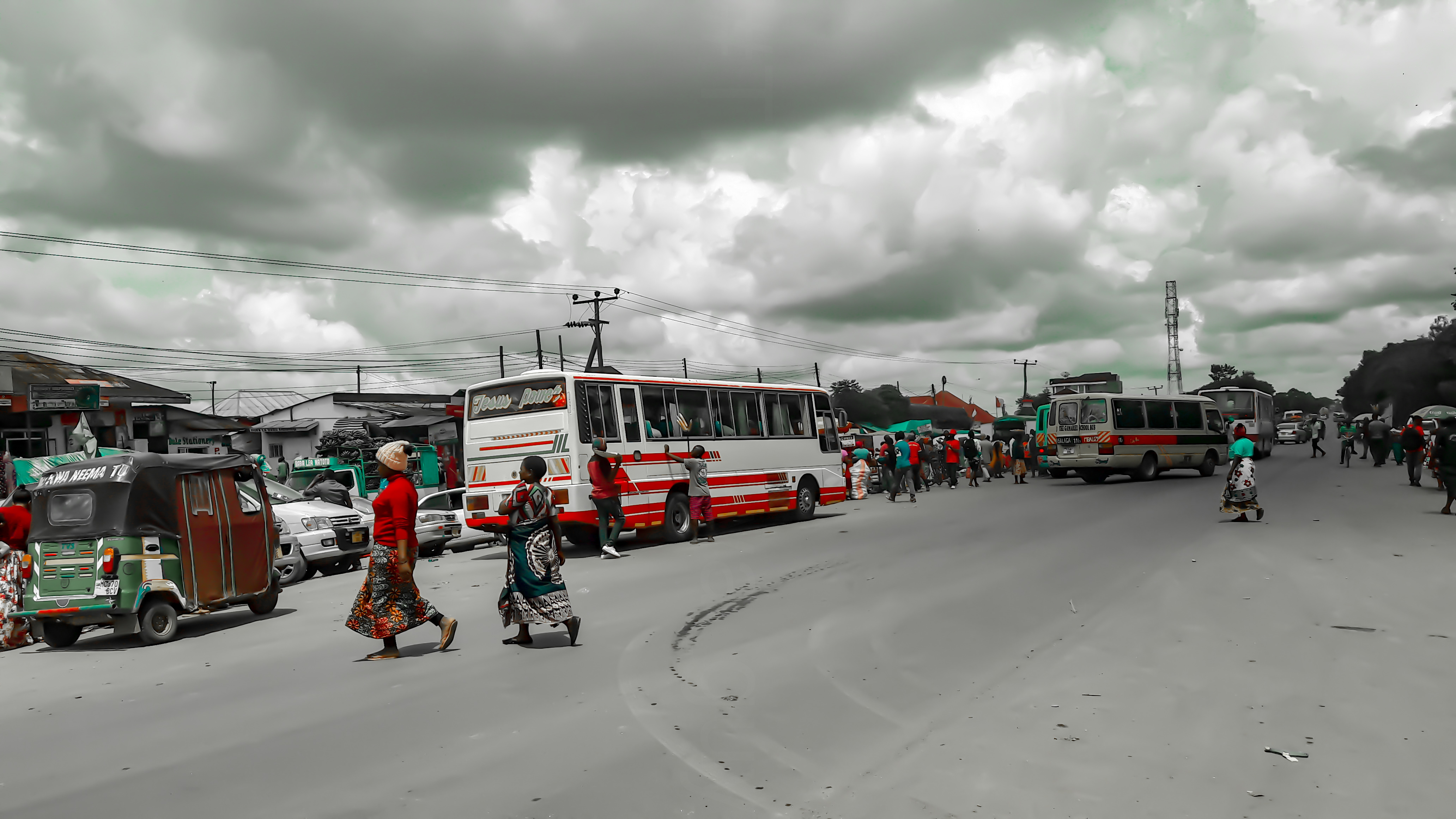
- Buses in Uyole

- Location within Tanzania Location within Africa
- Coordinates: 8°54′00″S 33°32′30″E
- Country: Tanzania
- Region: Mbeya Region
- District: Mbeya Urban
- Ward: Uyole

Population (2016)
  - Total: 12,722
- Time zone: UTC+3 (EAT)
- Postcode: 53126

Uyole is an administrative ward in the Mbeya Urban district of the Mbeya Region of Tanzania. In 2016 the Tanzania National Bureau of Statistics report there were 12,722 people in the ward, from 11,543 in 2012.

== Neighborhoods ==
The ward has 4 neighborhoods.

- Hasanga
- Ibara
- Iwambala
- Utukuyu
