= Mingoyo =

Ward in Lindi Municipal District, Lindi Region

Mingoyo Kata ya Mingoyo (Swahili)
- Ward
- Kata ya Mingoyo, Wilaya ya Lindi Manispaa
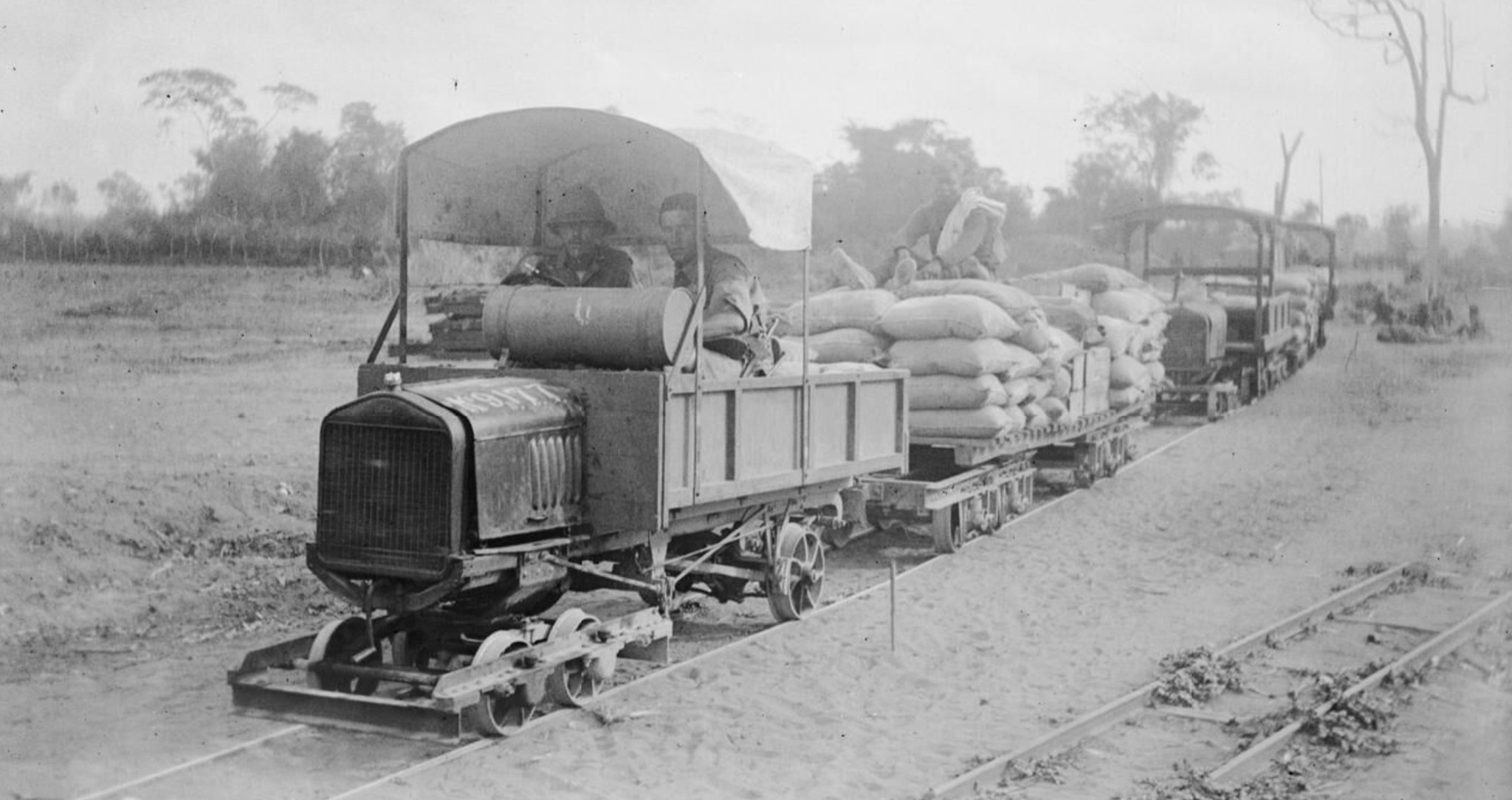
- 3 converted Ford Model Ts on the 2ft gauge light railway, taking supplies from Mingoyo to 'C. 23', 18th September 1917

- Location within Tanzania
- Country: Tanzania
- Region: Lindi Region
- District: Lindi Municipal District

Area
  - Total: 92 km^{2} (36 sq mi)
- Elevation: 47 m (154 ft)

Population (2012)
  - Total: 11,812
  - Density: 130/km^{2} (330/sq mi)
- Tanzanian Postal Code: 65104

Mingoyo is an administrative ward in Lindi Municipal District of Lindi Region in Tanzania. The ward covers an area of 92 km^{2} (36 sq mi), and has an average elevation of 47 m (154 ft). According to the 2012 census, the ward has a total population of 11,812.
