= Himo, Tanzania =

Himo
- Town
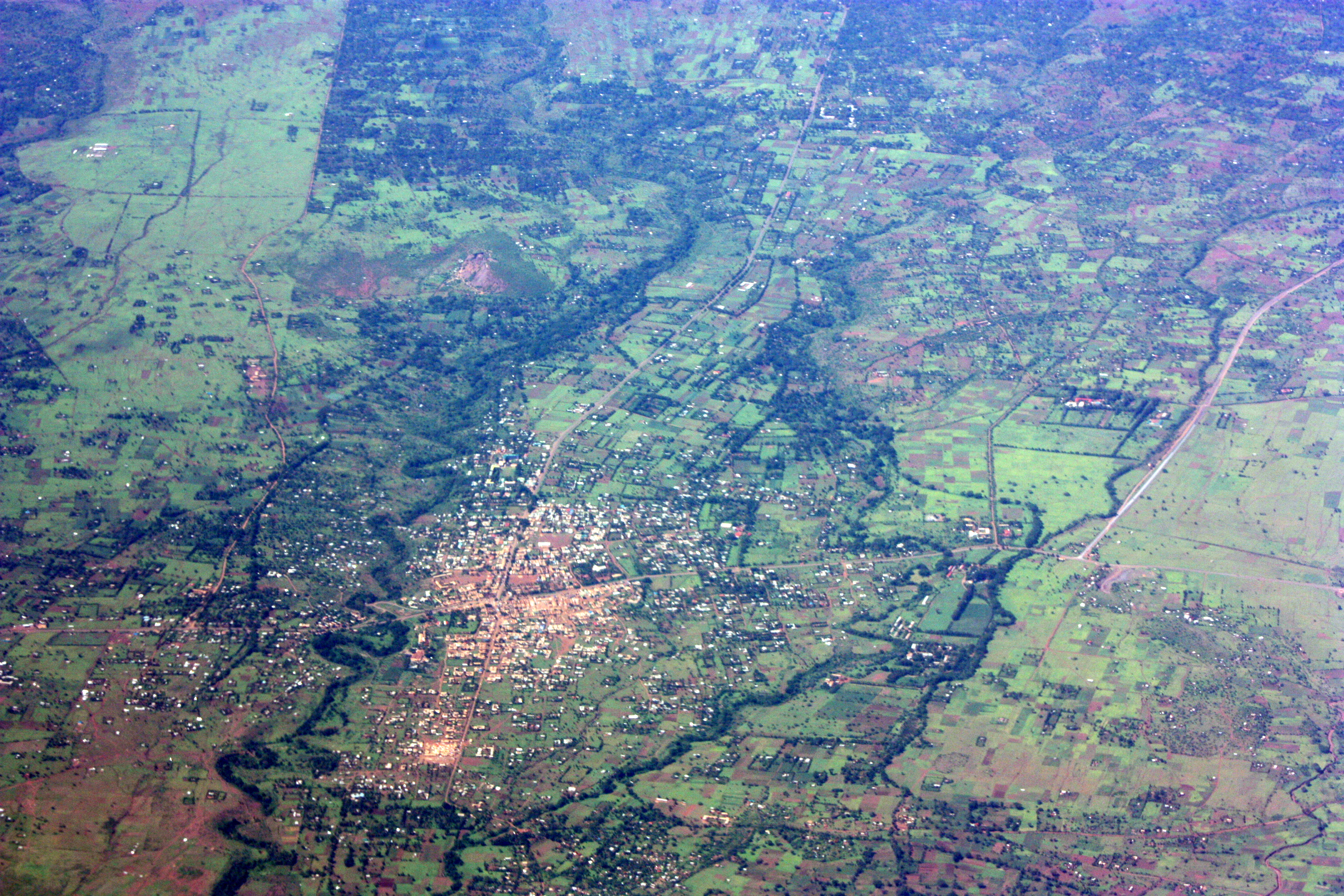
- Aerial view of Himo

- Location within Tanzania
- Coordinates: 3°22′48″S 37°33′0″E
- Country: Tanzania
- Region: Kilimanjaro Region
- District: Moshi District Council
- Ward: Makuyuni
- Time zone: UTC3 (East Africa Time)
- Postcode: 25223

Himo is a town in the Makuyuni ward of Kilimanjaro Region in Tanzania.

== Location ==
Himo is located at 3°22′48″S 37°33′0″E. Its growth in the 1980s was boosted when it became the centre of a thriving smuggling trade across the Kenyan border.

Himo is a central point town of the Moshi district. It is about 29 kilometres (18 mi) east of Moshi and about 15 kilometres (9.3 mi) from the Kenyan border and the town of Taveta. Himo is the start of the road north to Marangu, which is near the start of the Marangu Route to the summit of Mount Kilimanjaro.

Himo started to thrive in the 1950s with the arrival of the Moshi Trading company where they built a local railway system to work in the sisal plantations nearby. At that time some of the prominent Indian and Arab merchants made a foothold on the business and some are still present to this day.
