= Kabanga Nickel Project =

Mine in Tanzania

Coordinates: 2°53′S 30°33′E

The Kabanga Nickel Project is an active battery metals mine exploration project 130 km south west of Lake Victoria in the Ngara District of the Kagera Region in Tanzania. The project is a joint venture between Lifezone Metals and the Tanzanian Government. When completed, it is expected to produce 50,000 metric tons of high-grade nickel annually along with copper and cobalt byproducts.

The project was previously held in a partnership between Barrick Gold and Xstrata Nickel.

As of 16 July 2007 The exploration program has so far placed 9.7 million tonnes at 2.37% nickel into the indicated resource category, with an additional 30.3 million tonnes at 2.8% nickel in the estimated inferred resource category. Construction of the permanent mining camp is expected to begin in 2009 with operations commencing in 2011. At full capacity the mine is estimated to employ over 2,000 people. At present Xstrata has invested US$95 million in the pre-feasibility stage of development.
