= Kabanga, Kagera Region =

Ward in Ngara, Kagera, Tanzania

Kabanga Kata ya Kabanga
- Ward
- Location within Tanzania Location within Africa
- Coordinates: 02°54′08″S 30°29′55″E
- Country: Tanzania
- Region: Kagera Region
- District: Ngara District
- Ward: Kabanga
- Elevation: 1,540 m (5,050 ft)

Population (2016)
  - Total: 24,979
- Time zone: UTC+3 (EAT)
- Postcode: 35709

Kabanga is a ward in the Ngara District of the Kagera Region in Tanzania near the Burundian border. Wahagaza are the indigenous of Ngara. In 2016 the Tanzania National Bureau of Statistics report there were 24,979 people in the ward, from 22,010 in 2012.

== Villages ==
The ward has 25 villages.

- Mukafigiri
- Mukitangaro
- Mkisagara
- Muntamba
- Ibuga Na. 1
- Ibuga Centre
- Mukihahe
- Kichacha A
- Kichacha B
- Mukigoti
- Mndarangavye
- Djululigwa centre
- Murukoli
- Kabanga ya juu
- Kumushiha
- Nzaza A
- Nzaza B
- Mkagobero
- Murukukumbo chini
- Mundimanga
- Muchuya
- Mukitamo
- Murutete
- Mukirehe
- Murulango

== Transport ==
In 2021, a proposed railway to Rwanda would pass through this town.

== See also ==
- Kabanga Nickel Project
