= Makuyuni, Monduli =

Ward in Monduli District, Arusha Region

Makuyuni Kata ya Makuyuni
- Ward
- Location within Tanzania
- Coordinates: 3.546553°S 36.1045503°E
- Country: Tanzania
- Region: Arusha Region
- District: Monduli District
- Ward: Makuyuni

Population (2016)
  - Total: 12,529
- Time zone: UTC+3 (EAT)

Makuyuni is an administrative ward in the Monduli district of the Arusha Region of Tanzania. In 2016 the Tanzania National Bureau of Statistics report there were 12,529 people in the ward, from 11,228 in 2012.
