= Transport in Tanzania =

Tanzania’s transport system comprises road, rail, air, and maritime infrastructure, serving both domestic mobility and international trade through key ports like Dar es Salaam . The road network is 86,472 kilometres (53,731 mi) long, of which 12,786 kilometres (7,945 mi) is classified as trunk road and 21,105 kilometres (13,114 mi) as regional road. The rail network consists of 3,682 kilometres (2,288 mi) of track. Commuter rail service is in Dar es Salaam only. There are 28 airports, with Julius Nyerere International being the largest and the busiest. Ferries connect Mainland Tanzania with the islands of Zanzibar. Several other ferries are active on the countries' rivers and lakes.

== Roads ==
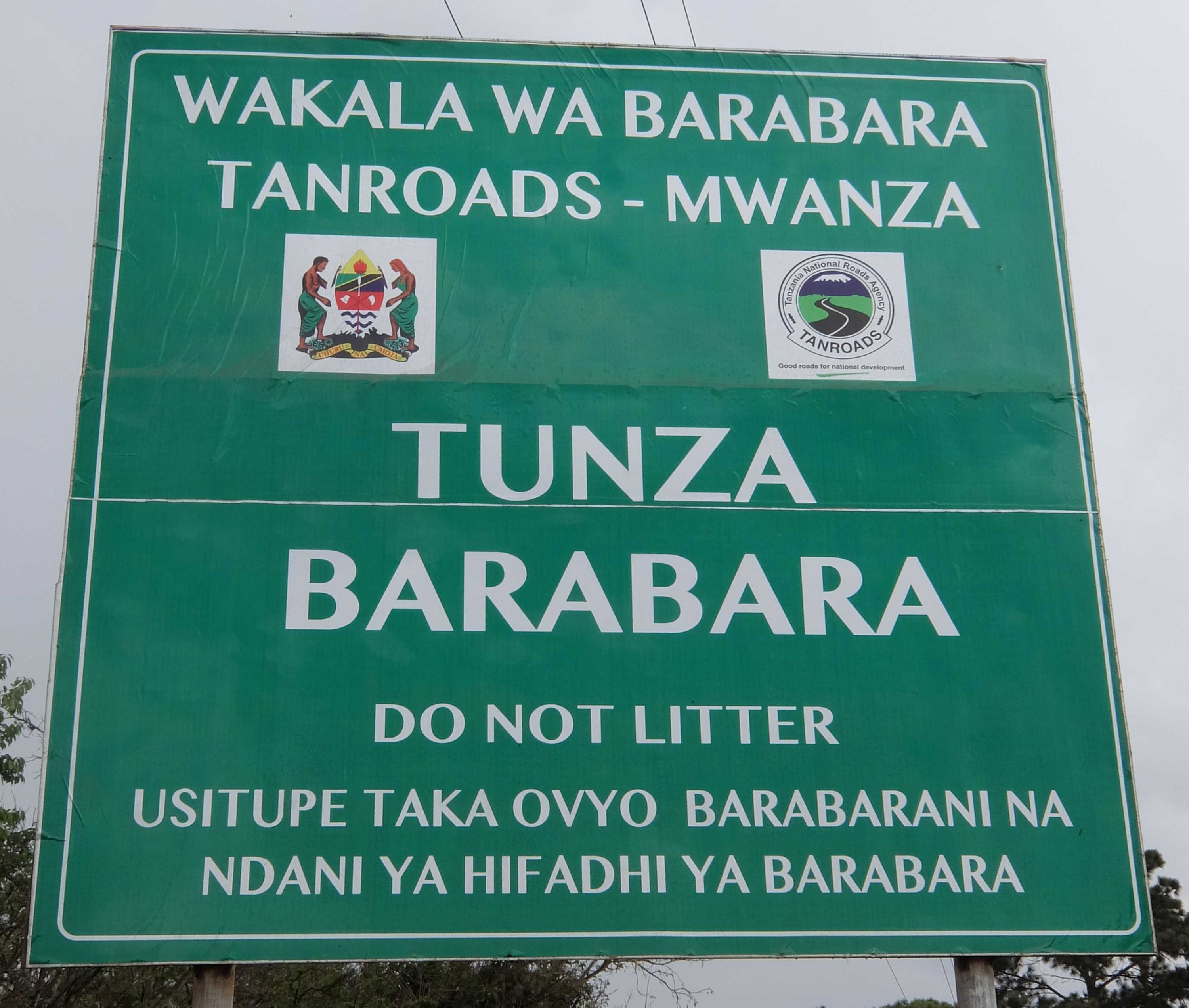
A sign by Tanzanian roads agency Tanroads, along the main road from Mwanza to Shinyanga.

The Tanzania National Roads Agency (TANROADS) - an Executive Agency under the Ministry of Works, Transport and Communications - came into operation in July 2000 and is the agency responsible for the maintenance and development of the trunk and regional road network in Mainland Tanzania. The total classified road network in Mainland Tanzania was estimated to be 86,472 kilometres (53,731 mi) based on the Road Act 2007. The Ministry of Works through TANROADS is managing the national road network of about 33,891 kilometres (21,059 mi), comprising 12,786 kilometres (7,945 mi) of trunk road and 21,105 kilometres (13,114 mi) of regional road. The remaining network of about 53,460 kilometres (33,220 mi) of urban, district and feeder roads is under the responsibility of the Prime Minister's Office Regional Administration and Local Government (PMO-RALG).

In 2007, there were 91,049 kilometres (56,575 mi) of roads, of which including 6,578 kilometres (4,087 mi) was paved. The road network ranked 51st worldwide by length.

=== Trunk roads ===
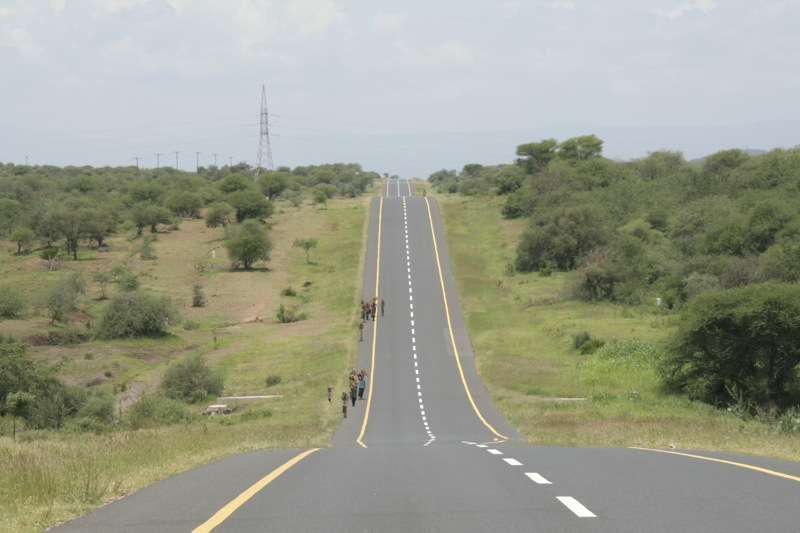
An example of one of the trunk roads.

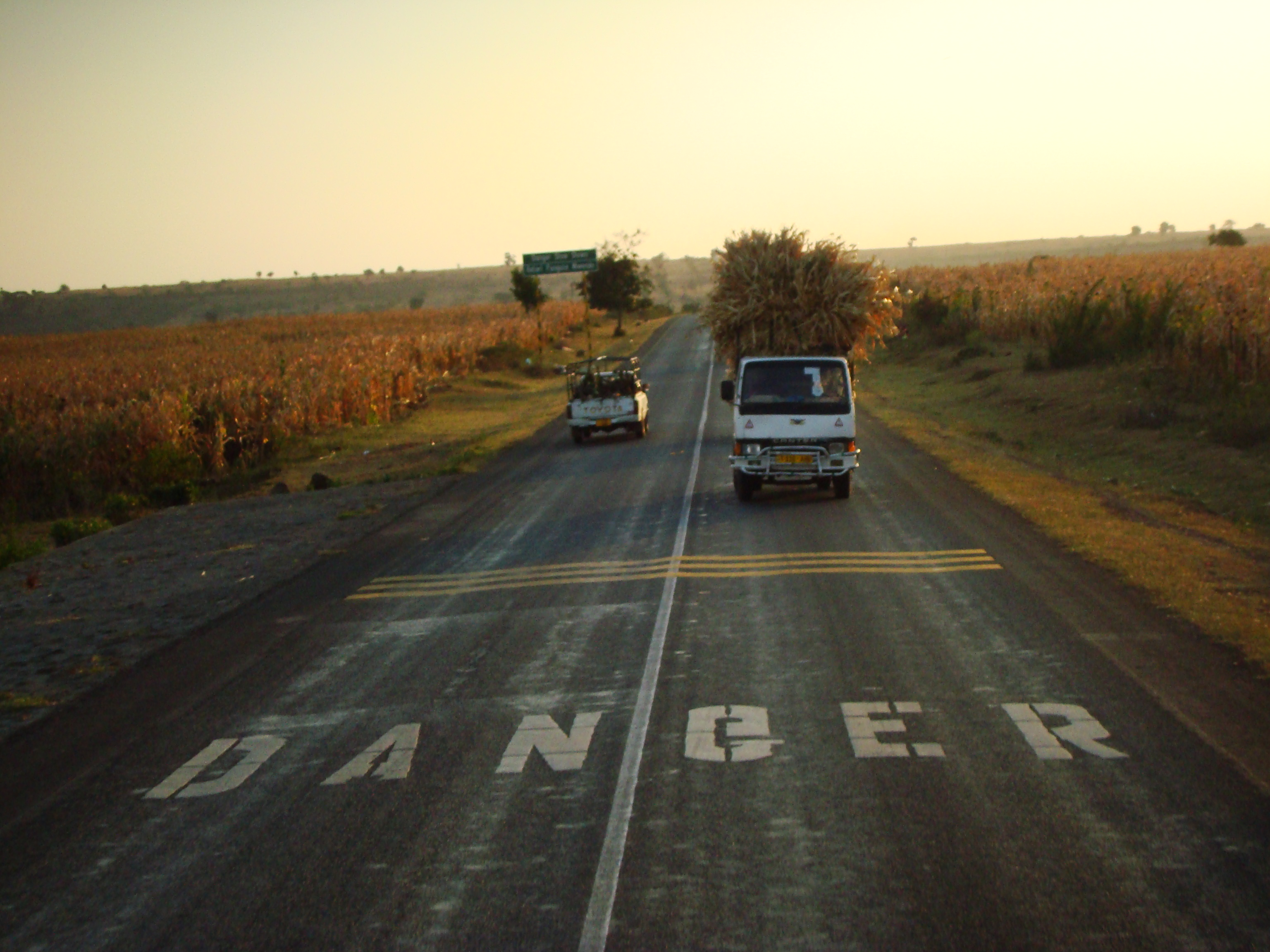
Trunk road, Kilimanjaro.

- Dar es Salaam and Dodoma (451 kilometres (280 mi) entirely paved): The A-7 road links Dar es Salaam and Morogoro. The B-129 road then connects Morogoro with Dodoma.
- Dar es Salaam and Iringa (492 kilometres (306 mi) entirely paved): The A-7 road links these cities.
- Dar es Salaam and Tanga (354 kilometres (220 mi) entirely paved): The A-7 road links Dar es Salaam and Chalinze. The A-14 road then connects Chalinze with Tanga.
- Dar es Salaam and Mtwara (556 kilometres (345 mi) entirely paved): The B-2 road links these cities.

The remainder of the road to Dar es Salaam is paved. The long Mkapa Bridge is on this stretch of road, spanning the Rufiji River.

- Tanga and Arusha (435 kilometres (270 mi) entirely paved): The A-14 road connects Tanga and Segera. From there, the B-2 road connects Segera with the road's terminus at the Himo Junction. The A-23 road then leads west to Moshi and Arusha.
- Dodoma and Mwanza on Lake Victoria (701 kilometres (436 mi) (entirely paved): The B-129 road leads west to Manyoni, followed by the B-141 road north to Singida. From there, the B-3 road leads mostly west to Nzega. The final stretch is on the B-6 road through Shinyanga to Mwanza.
- Dodoma and the border with Rwanda at Rusomo Falls (1,281 kilometres (796 mi) (entirely paved): From Nzega in the Tabora Region, the B-3 road leads to the Rwandan border (380 km (240 mi)).
- Kigoma and the border with Burundi at Manyovu: The road is entirely paved.
- Mwanza and Musoma (218 kilometres (135 mi) entirely paved): The B-6 road connects these cities and then proceeds north to the Kenyan border.
- Arusha and Namanga on the Kenyan border (106 kilometres (66 mi): The A-104 road is entirely paved.
- Iringa and Mbeya (330 kilometres (210 mi) entirely paved): The A-104 road links these cities, with its terminus in Tunduma on the Zambian border.

Trunk roads in Tanzania were marked by numbers following the two-tier number system with prefixes A- and B-, as is practiced in the rest of East Africa. Following is the list of Tanzanian trunk roads. Meanwhile, Tanzania has introduced a numbering system for trunk roads using numbers starting with "T" but so far the "A" designations are visible if at all.

Road No.	Length	Span	Via	Status	Remarks
A7	492 km	Dar es Salaam - Iringa	Chalinze - Morogoro - Mikumi	Paved	
A14	315 km	Chalinze - Horohoro	Segera - Tanga	Paved	Continues in Kenya up to Mombasa
A19	620 km	Masasi - Mbamba Bay	Tunduru - Songea - Mbinga	Paved/Unpaved	Paved: Masasi - Ngomano Road (56 km) and Namtumbo - Mbinga (168 km)
A23	117 km	Arusha - Holili	Moshi	Paved	Continues in Kenya up to Voi
A104	1,218 km	Tunduma- Namanga	Mbeya - Iringa - Dodoma - Kondoa - Arusha	Paved	Entirely part of Cairo-Cape Town Highway, recently paved: Dodoma - Babati (257 km)
B1	263 km	Segera - Himo		Paved	Connects A14 with A23
B2	561 km	Dar es Salaam - Mtwara	Kilwa - Lindi	Paved	Paved 30 km road to Kilwa Masoko from Nangurukuru
B3	625 km	Singida - Rusumo Falls	Nzega - Isaka - Kahama	Paved	Runs with B6 Nzega - Tinde (42 km), Continues as RN3 in Rwanda up to Kigali
B4	293 km	Makambako - Songea	Njombe	Paved	
B5	120 km	Mingoyo - Masasi		Paved	Connects B2 to A19
B6	1,071 km	Makogolosi - Sirari	Rungwa - Tabora - Shinyanga - Mwanza	Paved/Unpaved	Paved: Nzega - Sirari (524 km), Runs with B3 Nzega - Tinde (42 km)
B8	1,128 km	Kasesha - Mutukula	Sumbawanga - Mpanda - Kasulu - Biharamulo - Bukoba	Paved/Unpaved	Paved: Lusahunga (B3) - Mutukula (287 km)
B129	388 km	Morogoro - Manyoni	Dodoma	Paved	
B141	308 km	Rungwa - SIngida	Itigi - Manyoni	Paved/Unpaved	Paved: Itigi - Singida (160 km)
B143	151 km	Singida - Babati		Paved	
B144	390 km	Makuyuni - Kukirango	Karatu - Ngorongoro - Serengeti National Park	Paved/Unpaved	Paved: Makuyuni - Ngorongoro (79 km), rest can't be paved because it's a National Park
B163	230 km	Usagara - Biharamulo	Sengerema - Geita	Paved/Unpaved	Unpaved: Bwanga - Biharamulo (68 km), a paved road runs via Chato to go to Bukoba
B182	171 km	Nyakasanza - Kyaka	Kimisi - Burigi Game Reserve - Omurushaka	Paved/Unpaved	Paved: Omurushaka - Kyaka (57 km), connects B3 to B8
B182 W	111 km	Omurushaka - Murongo		Unpaved	Branches from B182 and runs up to Murongo border crossing with Uganda
	173 km	Bulahu - Lamadai	Bariadi	Paved/Unpaved	Paved: Bariadi - Lamadai (72 km), marked as trunk road by TANROADS but no number
	59 km	Nyakasanza - Kobero	Ngara - Kabanga	Paved	Branches from B3 up to Kobero border crossing with Burundi, continues as RN6 there

=== Regional roads ===
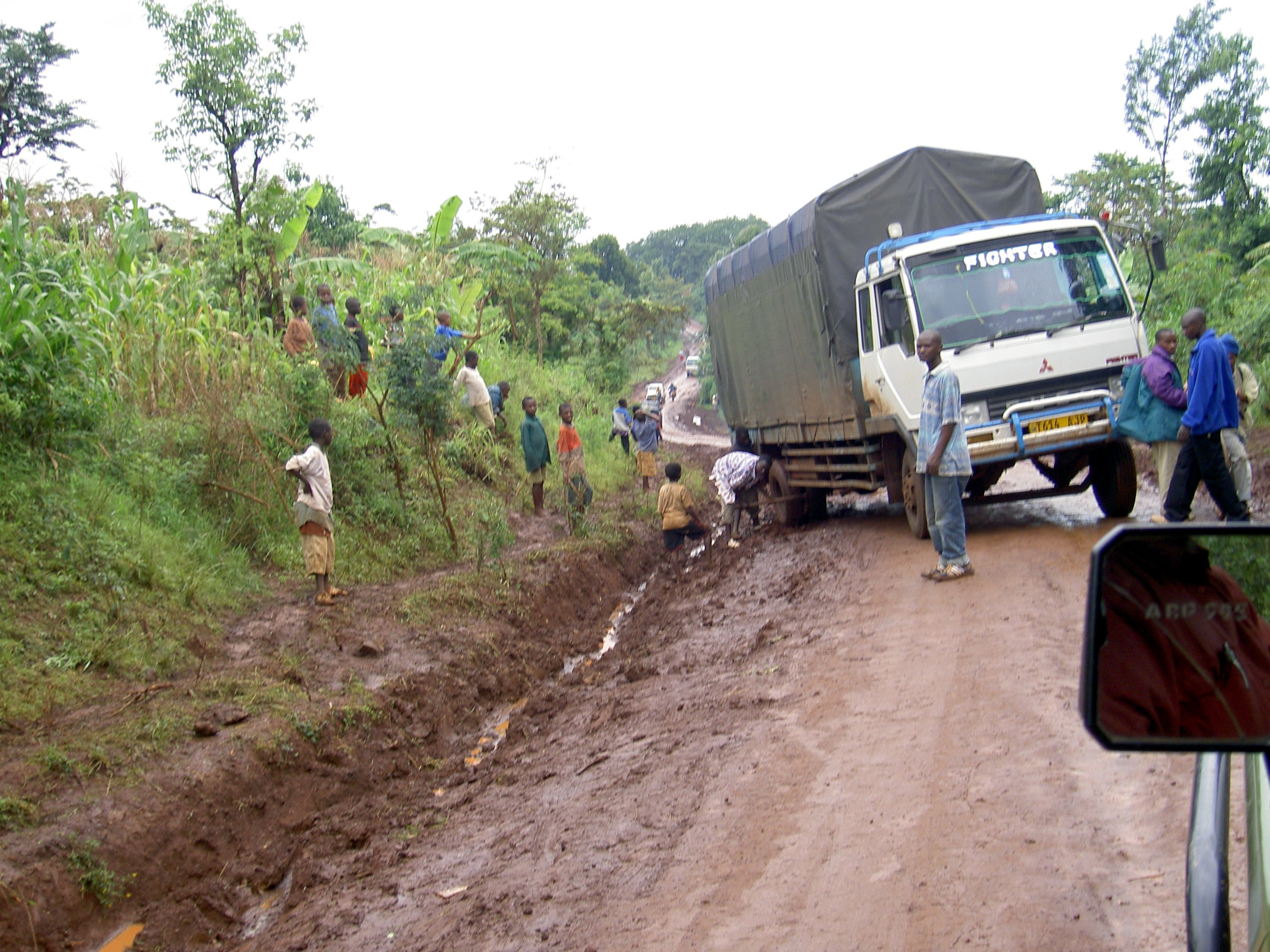
An unpaved road near Mount Kilimanjaro, 2007

- Mtwara Region: Paved roads link Mtwara and Masasi and from there almost to Nangoma. An unpaved road then leads to Mtambaswala and the modern Unity Bridge on the Mozambique border. The African Development Bank in April 2012 approved a loan to Tanzania to pave this road, followed in April 2013 with an additional loan of 7.659 billion yen (US$77.9 million) from Japan.
- Western regions are the most poorly served, with no paved highways except locally in Kigoma and Ujiji. Only one dirt road runs down the western side of the country, it is just a track between Kasulu and Sumbawanga and prone to flooding south of Mpanda. Between Tunduma in the south-west and Nyakanyazi junction near Kibondo in the north-west, a distance of nearly 1000 km, there are no highways in the centre of the country.

=== International highways ===
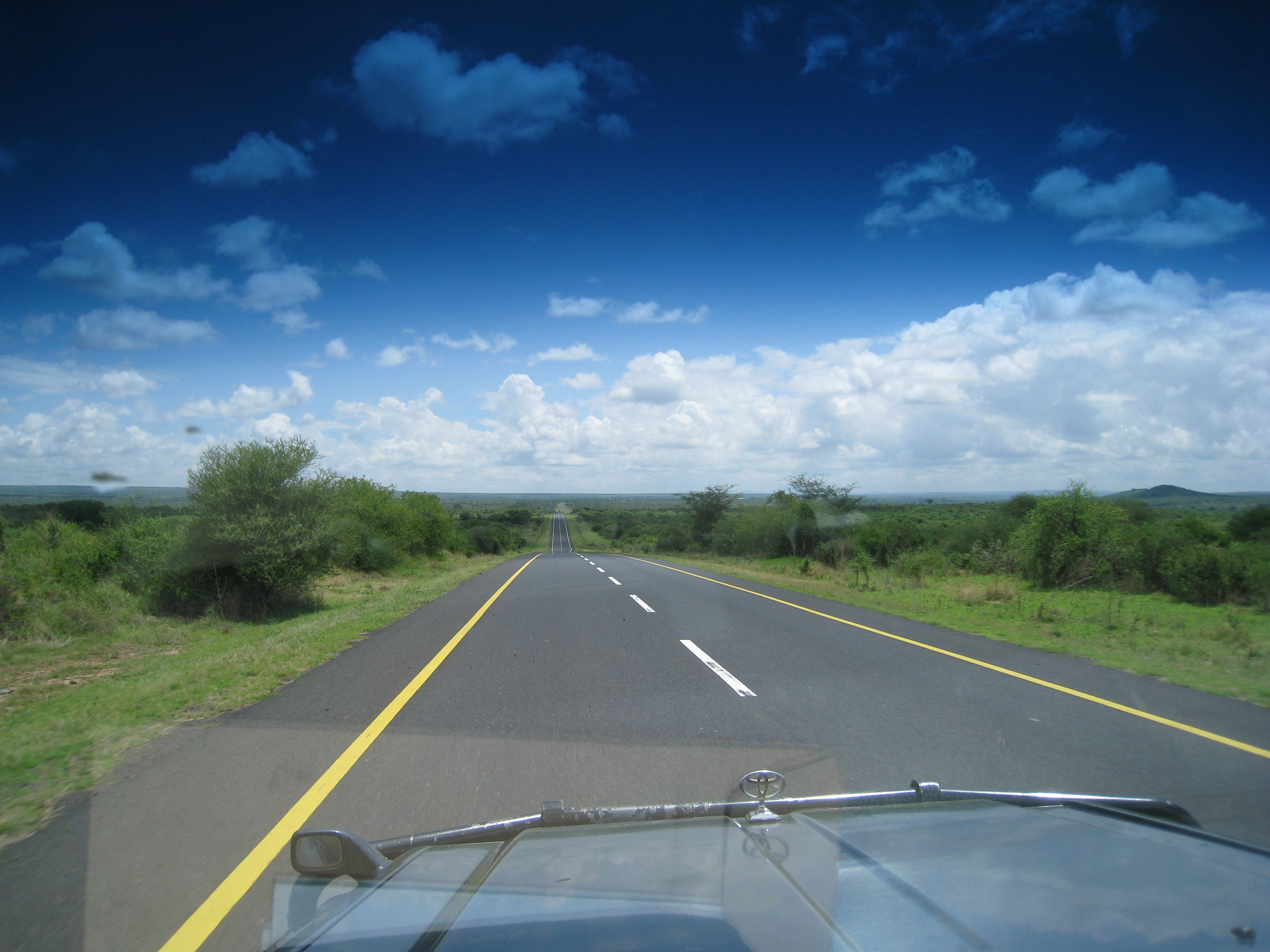
Road heading towards Ngorongoro

The Cairo-Cape Town Highway, Highway 4 in the Trans-African Highway network, runs between the northern town of Namanga on the Kenyan border and the Zambian border town of Tunduma in the southwest, via Arusha, Dodoma, Iringa, and Mbeya. The section between the entrance to Tarangire National Park and Iringa has been recently paved between Babati-Kondoa-Dodoma-Iringa. There is no longer a need to traverse a longer eastern route from Arusha to Iringa via Moshi and Morogoro is paved. This route is 921 kilometres (572 mi) versus 689 kilometres (428 mi) for the Arusha-Dodoma-Iringa route.

In the southwest, from Iringa to Tunduma, the Cairo-Cape Town Highway follows the Tanzam Highway linking Zambia and Dar es Salaam.

== Rail transport ==
━━━ Tanzania Railways ━━━ TAZARA Railway

In 2008 Tanzania had 3,689 km (2,292 mi) of rail, ranking it 46th in the world by length It includes 2,720 km (1,690 mi) of 1,000 mm (3 ft 3 3/8 in) Metre gauge and 969 km (602 mi) of 1,067 mm (3 ft 6 in) gauge track. On 31 March 2015 the Tanzanian government announced it would use $14.2 billion of commercial loans to build new rail infrastructure across the country before 2021 and make the country a regional transport hub.

=== Tanzania Railways ===
Proposals have been made for a railway to link Mtwara to iron ore deposits in the west, possibly connecting to Mbeya.

The central line between Kigoma and Dar es Salaam carries international freight and passengers in transit from Burundi, the Democratic Republic of the Congo, and Rwanda to the Indian Ocean, and the branch from Tabora to Mwanza carries freight and passengers between Uganda and the Indian Ocean.

Isaka Dry Port is a small town and station on the Mwanza Line at its intersection with the paved highway to Kigali. It has been developed into a so-called 'dry port' for trans-shipping Burundian and Rwandan road freight onto freight trains for the seaport of Dar es Salaam. There are proposals to build a railway from Isaka to Rwanda/Burundi.

=== TAZARA Railway ===
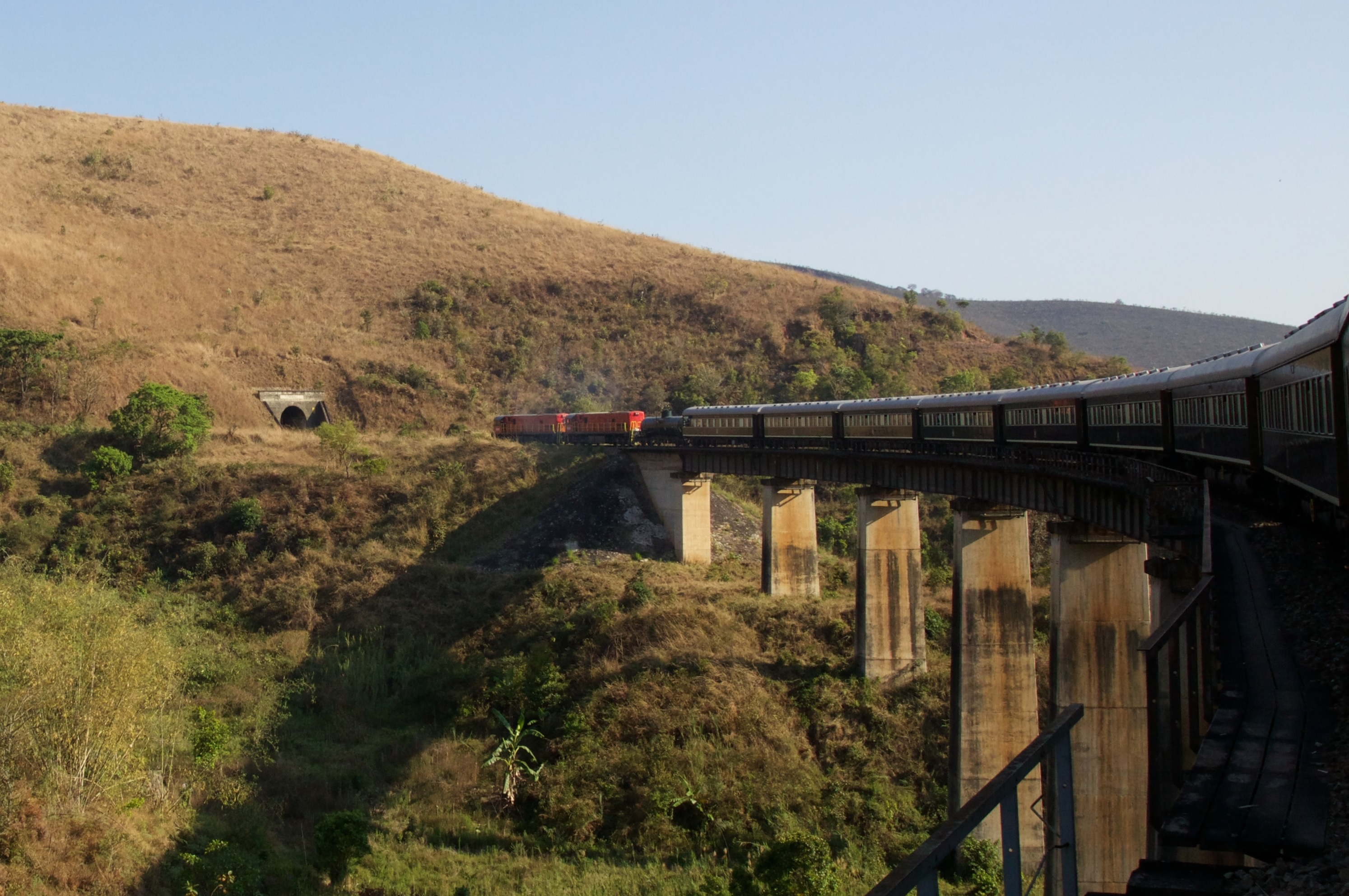
Rovos Rail, a luxury train entering a tunnel on the TAZARA line

The Tanzania-Zambia Railway Authority (TAZARA), formerly also called TanZam Railway operates 1,860 km (1,156 mi) of 1,067 mm (3 ft 6 in) narrow-gauge track (matching Zambian/Southern African networks) between Dar es Salaam and Kapiri Mposhi in Zambia, of which 969 km or 602 mi is in Tanzania and 891 km or 554 mi in Zambia). It is not a part of Tanzania Railways Corporation, and because of the difference in gauge there is no rail connection between the networks. There is a container trans-shipment yard to transfer freight containers between TAZARA and Tanzania Railways Corporation at Kidatu near Morogoro. This allows containers to be shipped from as far as Uganda and Kenya via the Lake Victoria train ferries and the Kidatu yard to the Southern African rail network via Zambia.

- Dar es Salaam - ocean port - 8 km from TRC line
- Kidatu - break of gauge connection with Tanzania Railways Corporation, with a container trans-shipment facility
- Mbeya
- Tunduma - Zambian border

== Air transport ==
=== Airports ===
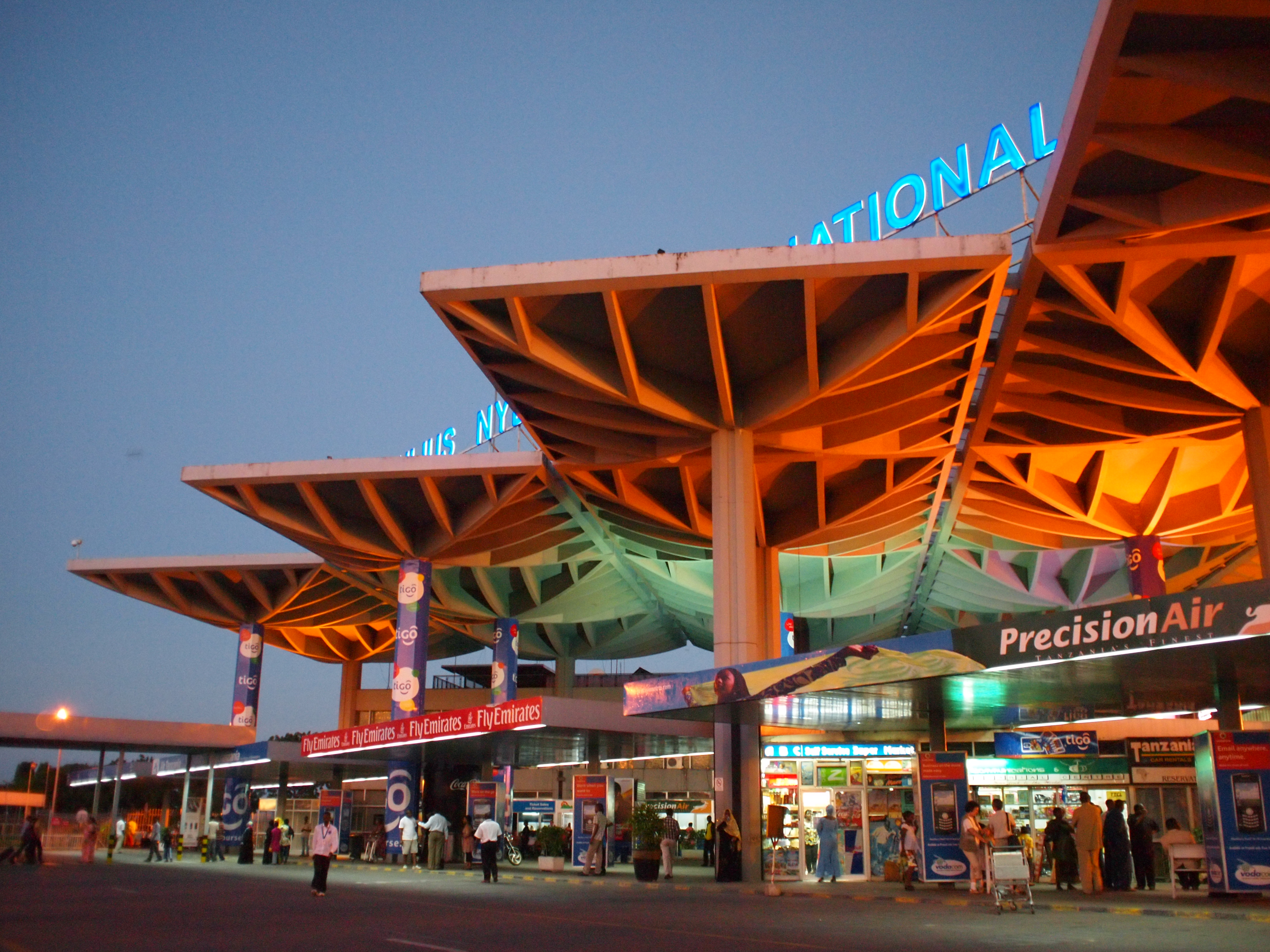
Julius Nyerere International Airport

Air travel is regulated by the Tanzania Civil Aviation Authority. The Tanzania Airports Authority operates 25 airports out of the 58 aerodromes on the Tanzania mainland. Kilimanjaro International is managed by the state-owned Kilimanjaro Airport Development Company, whilst airports in the semi-autonomous Zanzibar Archipelago are under the jurisdiction of the Zanzibar Airports Authority. Fifteen airports offer the airport of entry service.

Air services, both chartered and scheduled, are provided by local airlines such as the flag carrier Air Tanzania, Precision Air and Coastal Aviation. Prior to the launch of Fastjet, a low-cost carrier, air travel was and still is unaffordable for the vast majority due to high fares. The lowest fare offered by Fastjet for a single journey is US$20 (excluding tax) and its domestic route network is limited to only five destinations as the Airbus A319 requires 2,164 metres (7,100 ft) of runway for takeoff.

The government is cognizant of the importance of air travel to the economy and has therefore rehabilitated airports at strategic locations such as Kigoma to capture the market from neighboring countries. It intends to construct Kajunguti International Airport in the northwest to serve the African Great Lakes region. Other major airports under planning and consideration are Msalato International and Serengeti International, which will serve the capital Dodoma and the Serengeti National Park respectively.

=== Airstrips ===
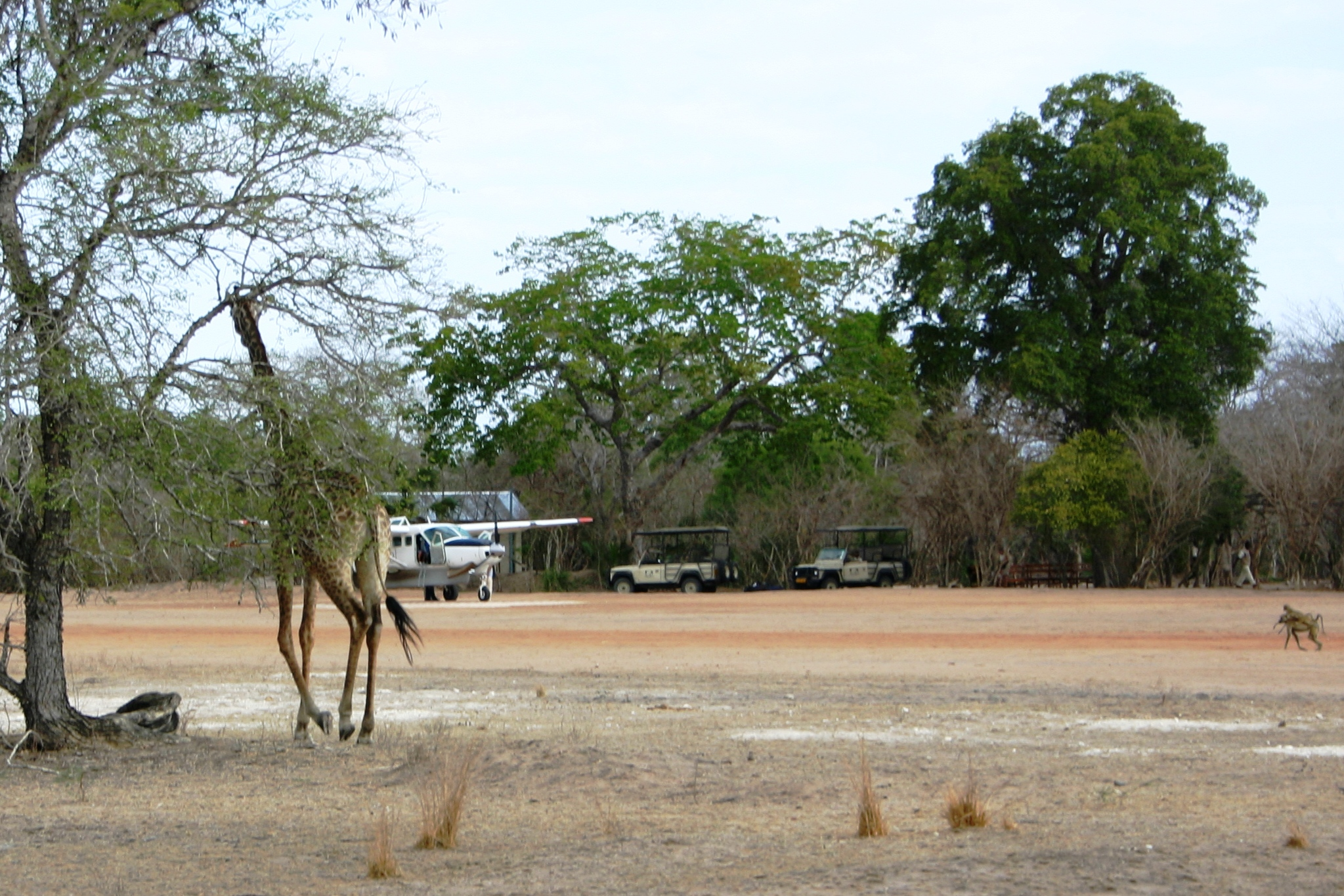
A giraffe passing by the Mtemere Airstrip in the Selous Game Reserve

There are a considerable number of both public and private airstrips. Tanzania Airports Authority manages 32 airstrips, such as Morogoro and Singida.

The Tanzania National Parks Authority operates 26 airstrips in national parks. Seronera Airstrip is the busiest in the country. Sixty-one airstrips are operated by the Ministry of Natural Resources and Tourism.

Private organisations own 93 aerodromes such as the Tanzania Petroleum Development Corporation operating Songo Songo Airstrip.

== Maritime transport ==
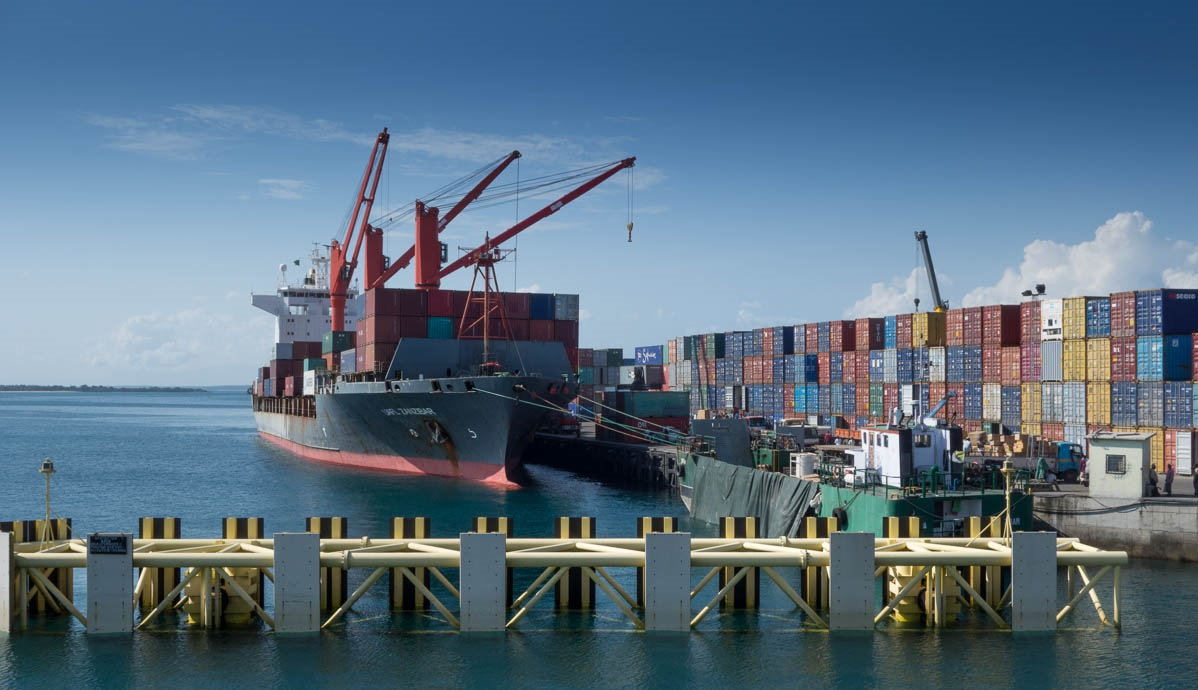
Zanzibar Harbour

=== Ports and harbours ===
There is an abundance of coastal and lake waterways. In the central areas there are no navigable lakes or rivers. There is a strong maritime tradition going back centuries. Zanzibar was once the chief port on the East African, Indian Ocean coast. Its hinterland reached into Central Africa as far as the middle Congo River. Swahili traders used dhows to conduct trade though many ports along the coast. This tradition continues today with motorized craft. In 2010, the government announced plans to develop a new port at Mbegani, near Bagamoyo as a deepwater harbour with a two-berth container terminal.

=== Ferries ===
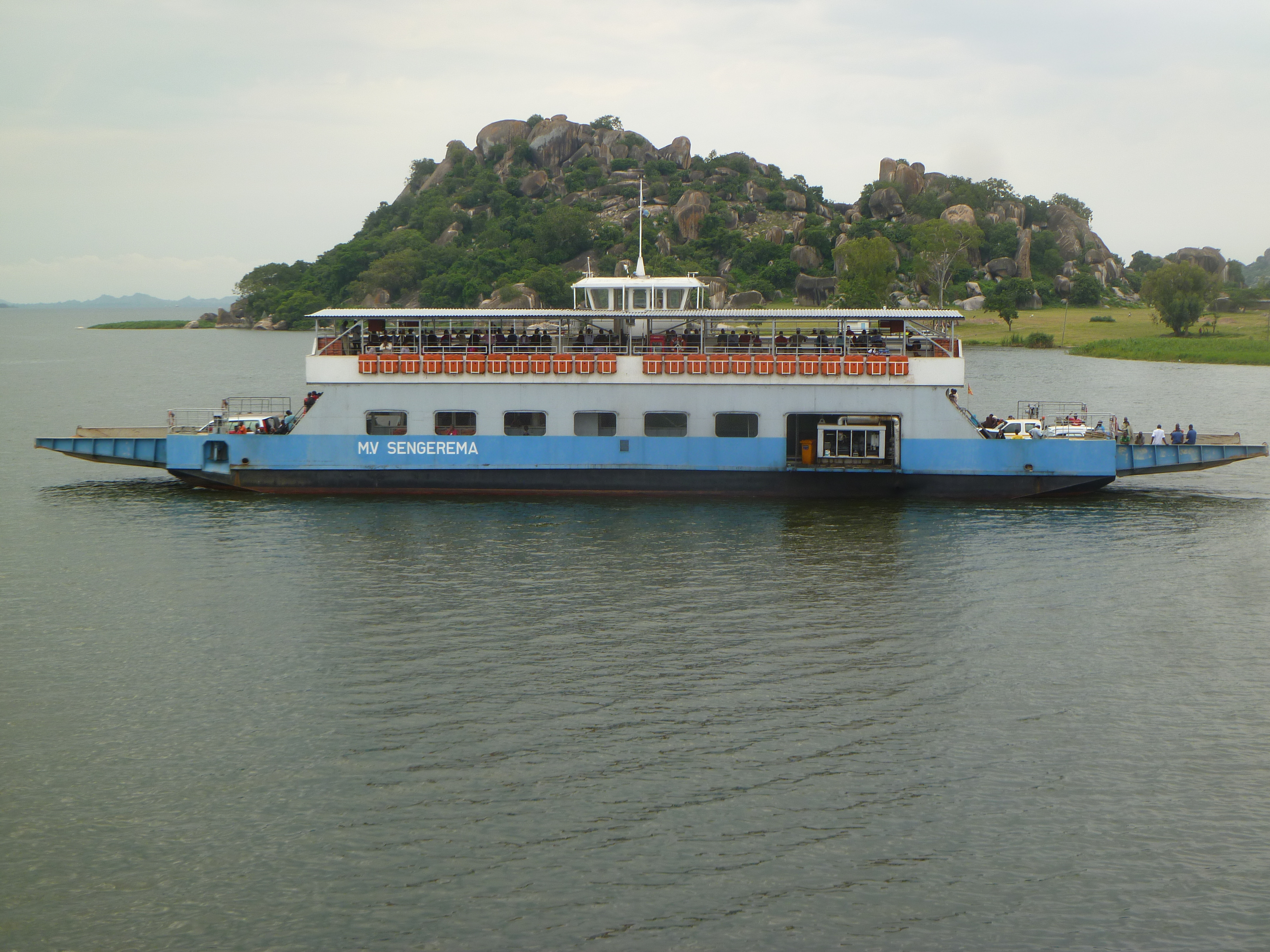
The MV Sengerema on Lake Victoria. Crossing of the trunk road from Mwanza to Geita.

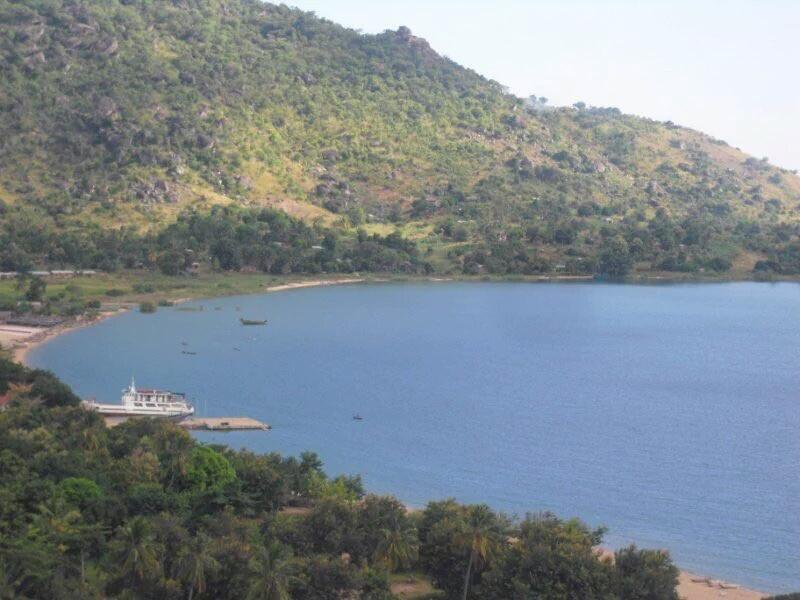
The Nyasa region (Mbamba bay) in Songea, Tanzania known for connecting two countries (Tanzania and Zambia).

Lake Victoria

For about 80 years, the Lake Victoria ferries have carried rail wagons and vehicles from Uganda to Tanzania. The ferries are jointly run by the railway companies of Tanzania and Uganda and are the main means of transport between Tanzania and Uganda as well as between northern Tanzania and southwestern Kenya. Other ferry services link the Zanzibar archipelago and Tanzanian ports.

Lake Tanganyika

Once a rival to Lake Victoria as a waterway, the Lake Tanganyika ferries are no longer as busy and train ferries no longer operate. Trade has suffered from wars in the Democratic Republic of the Congo. Small ferries link communities along the Tanzanian shore (some with no road access), and commercial traffic runs between Kigoma and Bujumbura, Burundi and Mpulungu, Zambia, including the MV Liemba.

Lake Nyasa

Communities along the northeast shore (some without road access) are linked by ferry, and Malawian steamer and boat services have run the length of the lake for about 120 years.

=== Merchant marine ===
In 2008 the merchant fleet consisted of nine Tanzanian-flagged vessels and one registered in Honduras. The small number of ships may be attributed to the few exports, the relative insufficiency of its coast guard and naval forces, and the single major port in Dar es Salaam. The nine domestically flagged ships are one cargo ship, four passenger/cargo ships, and four oil tankers.

Goods are cleared under the East African Community Customs Management Act of 2004. An importer must appoint a licensed clearing and forwarding agent, and declarations are processed online through the Tanzania Customs Integrated System, with documents required to be submitted at least seven days before the goods arrive.

== Other modes ==
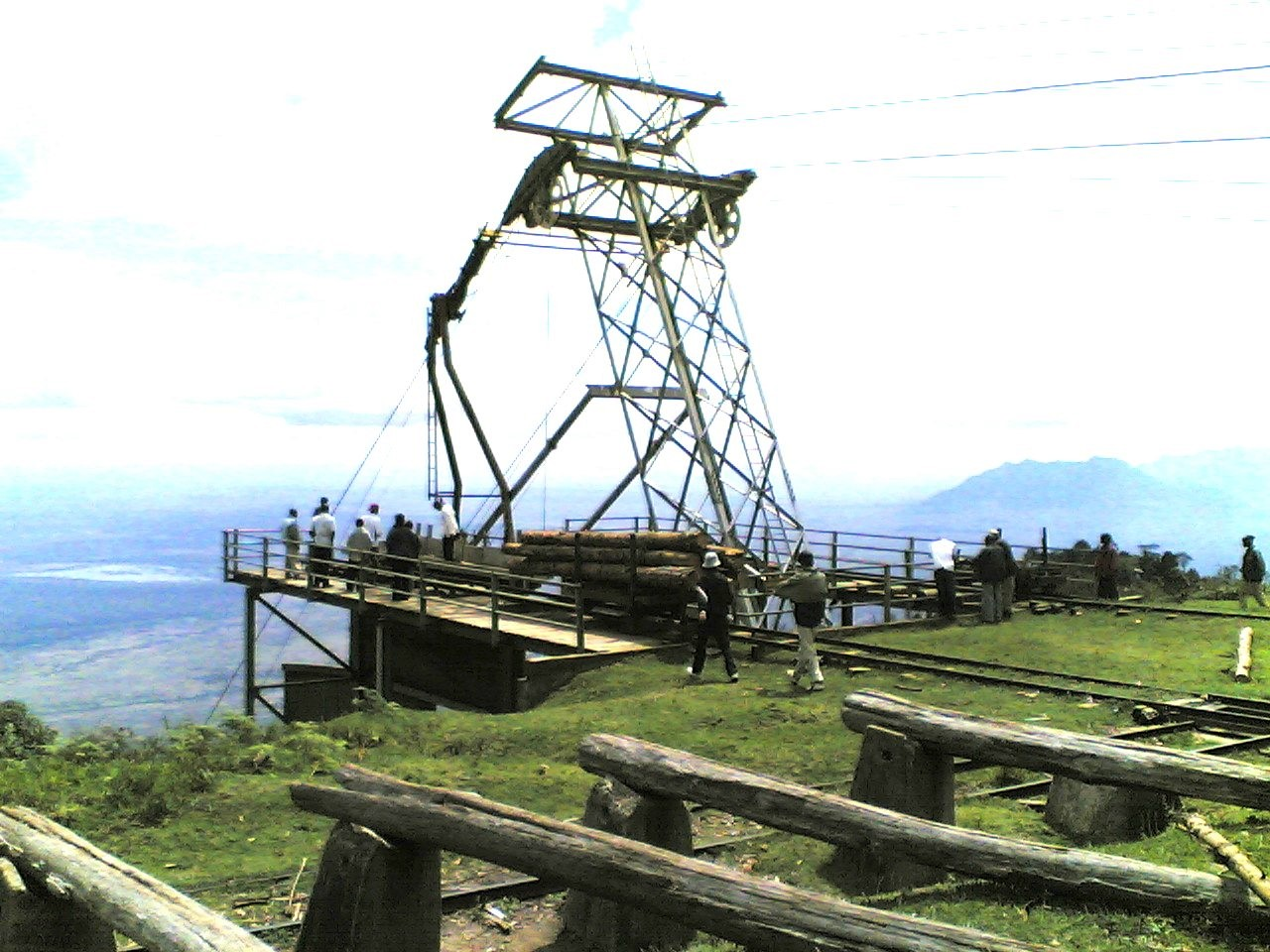
Skyline logging at Shume, Lushoto

=== Pipeline transport ===
In 2008 there were 253 km (157 mi) of gas pipeline, 888 km (552 mi) of oil pipeline, and an 8 km (5.0 mi) pipeline for refined petroleum products. The privately owned Tazama Pipeline accounts for a large portion of the crude oil transportation capability. It currently handles 600,000 tons of crude oil per year, but was designed to handle 1.1 million tons.

=== Skyline logging ===
A cable logging system exists in Lushoto District, whereby logs are transported from the Usambara Mountains downhill.

== See also ==
- Ministry of Transport (Tanzania)
- MV Liemba
- Economy of Tanzania
- Usambara Railway
- East African Railway Master Plan
- Lake Victoria ferries
