= Malawi–Tanzania relations =

Malawian–Tanzanian relations
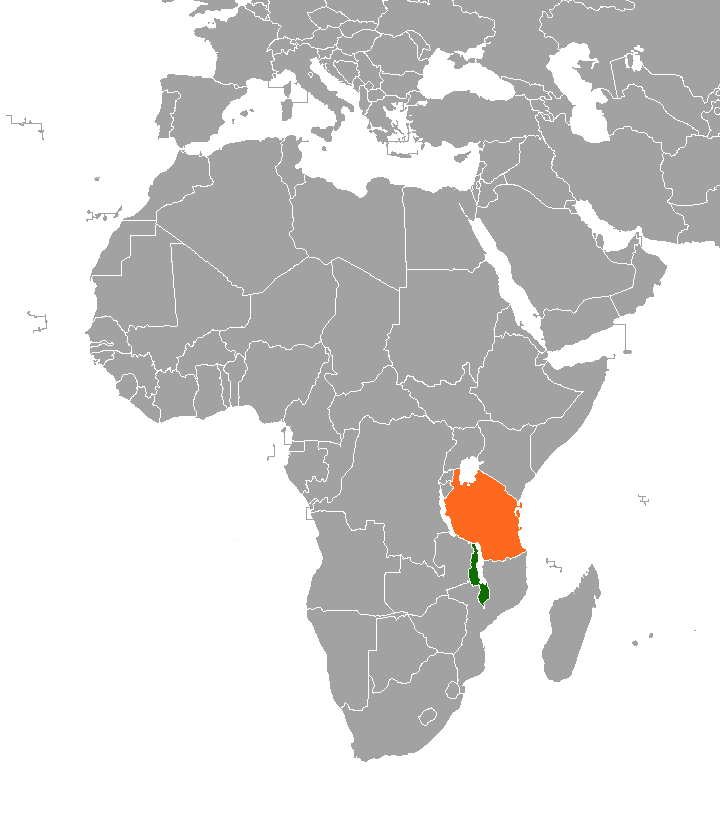
- Malawi: Tanzania

Malawi and Tanzania have formal relations.

== History ==
Malawi and Tanzania established diplomatic relations in 1985.

=== Lake Malawi dispute ===
The two countries share a border at Lake Malawi; the border demarcation has been a dispute between the two countries since the independence of both nations. Several diplomatic exchanges have erupted over time, however, both countries have not come to an agreement. The lake is referred to as Lake Nyasa in Tanzania.

=== High-level visits ===
- July 2023, Samia Suluhu Hasan made a state visit to Malawi to attend the 59th independence anniversary celebrations.

== Trade and economy ==
Malawi gets a significant amount its imports/exports through the port of Port of Dar es Salaam. Malawi and Tanzania have one major land crossing in Songwe-Kasumulu; both countries are working to develop a one-stop border post at the crossing. Alternatively, various ferries operate between the two countries on Lake Malawi with the two major ports being Mbamba Bay (Tanzania) and Nkhata Bay (Malawi).

Malawi Airlines operates regular scheduled flights between Malawi and Julius Nyerere International Airport.

=== 2025 trade war ===
In early 2025, Malawi and Tanzania became embroiled in a trade dispute that temporarily disrupted bilateral economic relations. The conflict began in March when Malawi imposed a ban on agricultural imports from Tanzania and other countries, citing the need to support local industries and address foreign exchange shortages. This measure came despite Malawi’s heavy reliance on Tanzanian bananas, which made up the bulk of over $491,000 in banana imports in 2023.

In retaliation, Tanzania implemented its own ban in April, halting all agricultural imports from Malawi and extending restrictions to include fertilizer exports and even goods transiting through its territory to Malawi. The escalation affected traders and markets across the region, particularly given Malawi’s dependence on Tanzanian seaports for fuel and other imports, as access through Mozambique remained unreliable due to conflict and unrest.

A resolution was reached in early May through high-level bilateral talks, leading to a joint communique and the lifting of trade restrictions. However, while diplomatic ties normalized, practical supply chain recovery for affected traders remained ongoing as of May 2025.

== Resident diplomatic missions ==
- Malawi has a high commission in Dar es Salaam.
- Tanzania has a high commission in Lilongwe.

=== Tanzanian High Commissioners to Malawi ===
The following is a list of Tanzanian High Commissioners to Malawi.

Name	Start	End	President
Maj. Gen. Makame M. Rashid	2004	2009	Benjamin Mkapa (2004-2005)
Maj. Gen. Makame M. Rashid	2004	2009	Jakaya Kikwete (2005-2009)
Patrick Luciano Tsere	2010	2015	Jakaya Kikwete
Victoria Richard Mwakasege	2015	2017	John Magufuli
Benedict Martin Mashiba	1 August 2017	15 March 2022	John Magufuli (2017-2021)
Benedict Martin Mashiba	1 August 2017	15 March 2022	Samia Suluhu Hassan (2021-2022)
Humphrey Polepole	15 March 2022	3 April 2023	Samia Suluhu Hassan
Agnes Richard Kayola	24 July 2023	present	Samia Suluhu Hassan

== See also ==
- Mtwara Development Corridor
- TAZARA Railway
