= Timeline of African Union of Railways =

The Timeline of African Union of Railways includes the dates of the inauguration of railway lines throughout the nations of the African Union. To date, much railway expansion has been concentrated in Central Africa.

== East Africa ==
=== 2010 ===
- Dakar-Port Sudan Railway

== Central Africa ==
=== 2007 ===
According to Railway Gazette International of November 2007, East Africa (TZ, KE, ET and UG) are proposing lines aplenty.

- Kasese, Uganda to (Democratic Republic of the Congo) Kisangani, DRCongo
- (Uganda) Gulu to Nimule and Juba in Sudan
- Pakwach, Uganda to Juba and Wau in Sudan
- Garissa, Kenya to Addis Abeba in Ethiopia
- (Kenya) Lamu to (Kenya) Garissa and (Sudan) Juba again
- Masaka, Uganda to Biharamulo, Tanzania

Another seven (eight?) routes include:

- (Tanzania) Mbamba Bay on Lake Nyasa to (Tanzania) Ligunga via (Tanzania) Mchuchuma coal mines.
- (Tanzania) Ligunga to (Tanzania) Mlimba
- (Tanzania) Dar-es-Salaam to port of (Tanzania) Mtwara
- (Tanzania) Tunduma on TZ-ZM border via (Tanzania) Sumbawanga and (Tanzania) Mpanda to (Tanzania) Kigoma
- (Tanzania) Uvinza to Bujumbura, in Burundi
- (Tanzania) Bagamoyo to (Tanzania) Kidomole
- (Tanzania) Isaka Dry Port to Kigali in Rwanda

== Gauge unification ==
Triple gauge for the three main gauges in Africa are a practible solution for mixed gauge tracks.

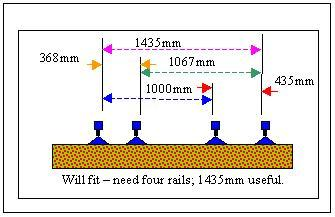
1000 mm and 1067 mm gauges can be combined as a 4 rail dual gauge with bonus 1435 mm gauge

Triple gauge supports the three main gauges in Africa: Red: 1,000 mm (3 ft 3 3/8 in), Green: 1,067 mm (3 ft 6 in) and Blue: 1,435 mm (4 ft 8 1/2 in). The wide separation or the outer pairs of rails (435 mm and 368 mm) provides space for railclips and suits turnout construction.

Narrow 1,067 mm (3 ft 6 in) gauge and Metre 1,000 mm (3 ft 3 3/8 in) gauge are too similar (67mm) to allow third rail dual gauge. Four rails must be used, which creates a third gauge, which may as well be 1,435 mm (4 ft 8 1/2 in) gauge.

== See also ==
- Union of African Railways
