= List of ports in Tanzania =

This list of Ports and harbours in Tanzania details the ports, harbours around the coast of Tanzania.

== List of ports and harbours in Tanzania ==
Port/Harbour name	Region	Town name	Coordinates	Remarks
Port of Dar es Salaam	Dar es Salaam Region	Dar es Salaam	06°49′S 39°17′E	The most important port of Tanzania, which handles over 90% of the country's cargo traffic.
Port of Tanga	Tanga Region	Tanga	05°03′S 39°07′E	Medium-sized port
Mtwara Port	Mtwara Region	Mtwara	10°16′S 40°11′E	Medium-sized port
Port of Zanzibar	Zanzibar North	Zanzibar City	06°09′S 39°11′E	Medium-sized port on the coast of Unguja
Port of Mkoani	Pemba South Region	Mkoani	05°21′S 39°38′E	Medium-sized port on the coast of Pemba Island
Port of Bukoba	Kagera Region	Bukoba	01°20′S 31°48′E	Medium-sized port on the south western shores of Lake Victoria. Tanzania's second largest port on Lake Victoria after Mwanza
Port of Mwanza	Mwanza Region	Mwanza	05°21′S 39°38′E	Small-sized port on the southern shore of Lake Victoria.
Port of Kigoma	Kigoma Region	Kigoma	04°53′S 29°38′E	Lake port on the northeastern shores of Lake Tanganyika.
