= Mtwara Development Corridor =

Infrastructure project in East Africa

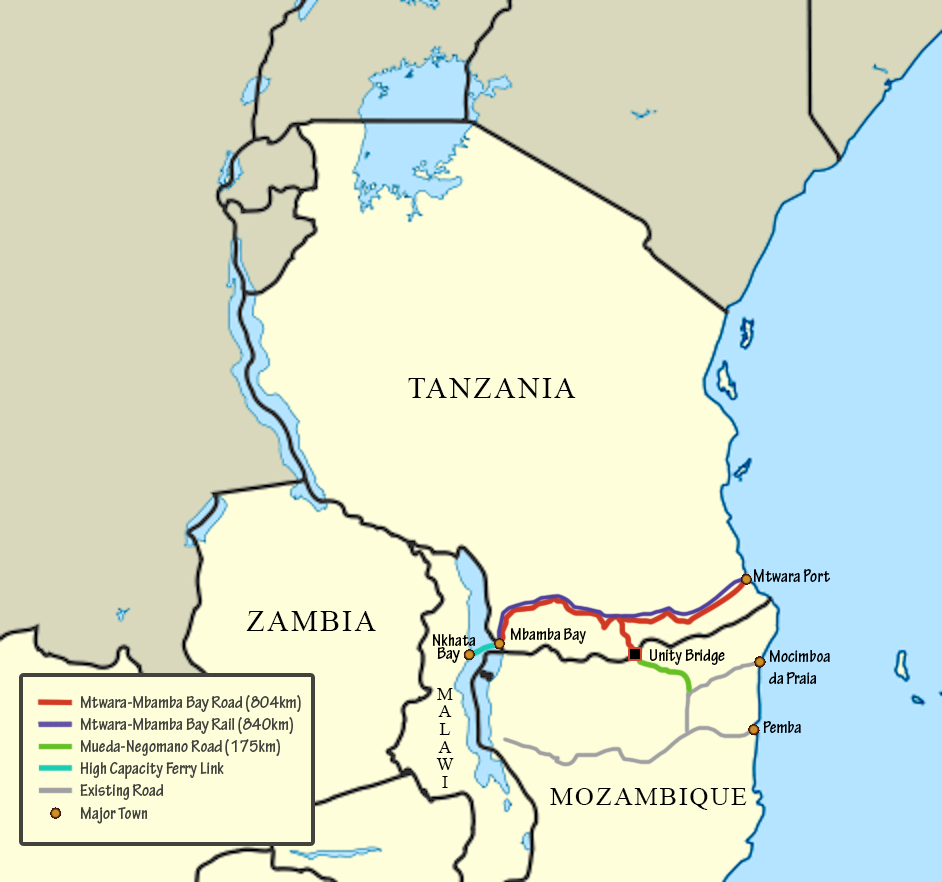
Map of planned infrastructure

The Mtwara Development Project is a major infrastructure development project involving southern Tanzania, northern Mozambique, eastern Malawi and Eastern Zambia. The goal of this project is to provide road, rail and waterway access from the surrounding region to the Port of Mtwara. The region and the corridor has been neglected by the respective governments for over 40 years and the recent discovery of oil, gas and various minerals has kick started the development of the project. A road and rail link is to be built from the port of Mtwara to Mbamba Bay on Lake Nyasa to link Malawi to the corridor and further road links into Mozambique will facilitate access to northern Mozambique.

== History ==
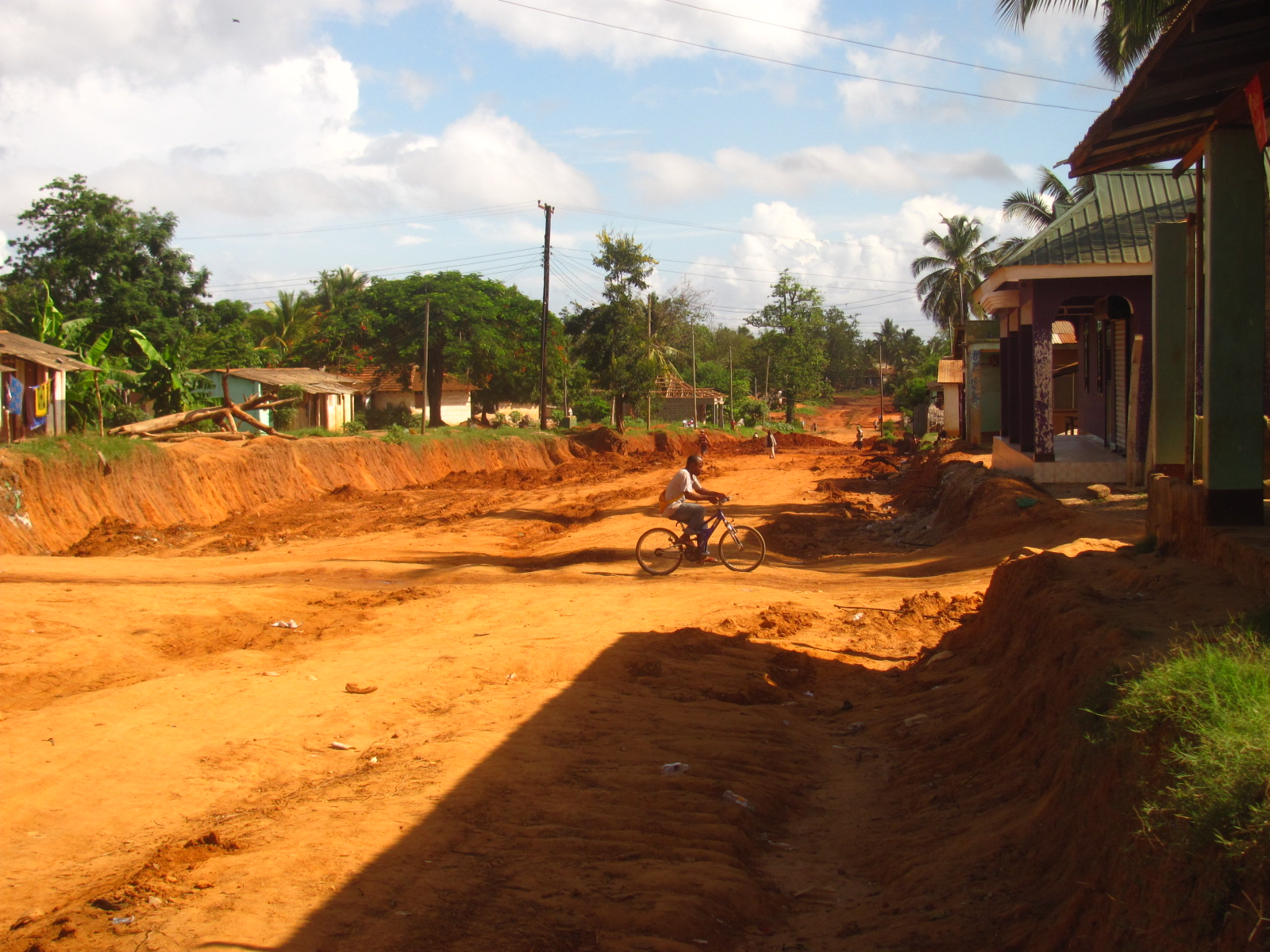
Construction of a new road towards the Mtwara Port

The talks of the project began during the early 2000s where leaders of the 4 SADC community members met to create a shorter/alternative path for cargo into the region from the Dar es salaam port. The last time the region saw a major infrastructure investment was during the colonial times. The Mtwara port and a minor railway link was developed during the British colonial times as part of the failed Tanganyika groundnut scheme. Post colonial times the south of Tanzania had seen very little development and was often neglected in infrastructure projects as the region brought very little revenue to the coffers.

In late 2004 the leaders of the four participating countries; Benjamin Mkapa (Tanzania), Joaquim Chissano (Mozambique), Bingu wa Mutharika (Malawi) and Levy Mwanawasa (Zambia) managed to sign a Memorandum of Understanding to make the Mtwara Development Corridor a reality. The aim of the corridor was to create competitive transport links for the region to help boost the informal and formal industry. The project was to help regional integration to facilitate growth in agriculture, fisheries, tourism and the mining sector. The development project involved building and rehabilitating over 800 kilometres (500 mi) of roads and involved the construction of Unity Bridge. Furthermore, the ports of Mtwara and Mbamba Bay were to be upgraded to handle high volumes of cargo.

=== 2016 ===
To help boost business in the area the Tanzania Ports Authority embarked on a project to introduce three new ships into Lake Nyasa. The authority will buy 2 cargo ships each with a capacity of 1,000 tonnes and one passenger ferry.

== Road and rail links ==
=== Road ===
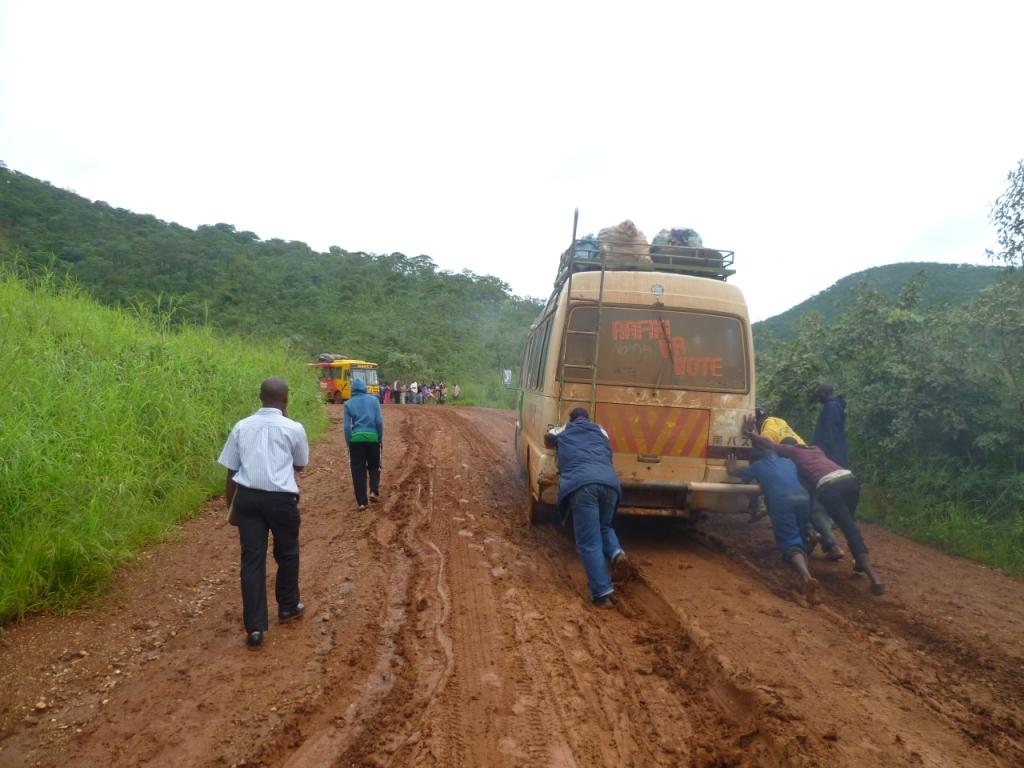
The state of roads in the Ruvuma Region in 2012

An 804 kilometres (500 mi) road from the port of Mtwara to Songea has a sealed surface already. The onward route through to Mbamba Bay via Mbinga is not all sealed. Furthermore, another road from the Mtwara-Songea highway branches off to the Ruvuma River at the Mozambique border. At the border the Unity bridge was completed in 2010 and Mozambique is to construct a 175 kilometres (109 mi) road from Negomano to Mueda connecting the corridor to Mozambique's highway 246.

=== Railway construction ===
With the high amounts of mineral deposits found in the south along the corridor the Government of Tanzania deemed the construction of a railway to be economically feasible. The railway line is to span 1,000 kilometres (620 mi) from Mtwara port to Mbamba Bay through Mchuchuma and Liganga areas. The railway line is to cost TSh 8.4 trillion and the Government of Tanzania is looking to implement the project under a Public and Private Partnership (PPP). The railway line will complement all the coal and iron mining operations in Mchuchuma and Liganga and make Tanzanian coal and iron exports more attractive internationally.

=== Unity Bridge ===
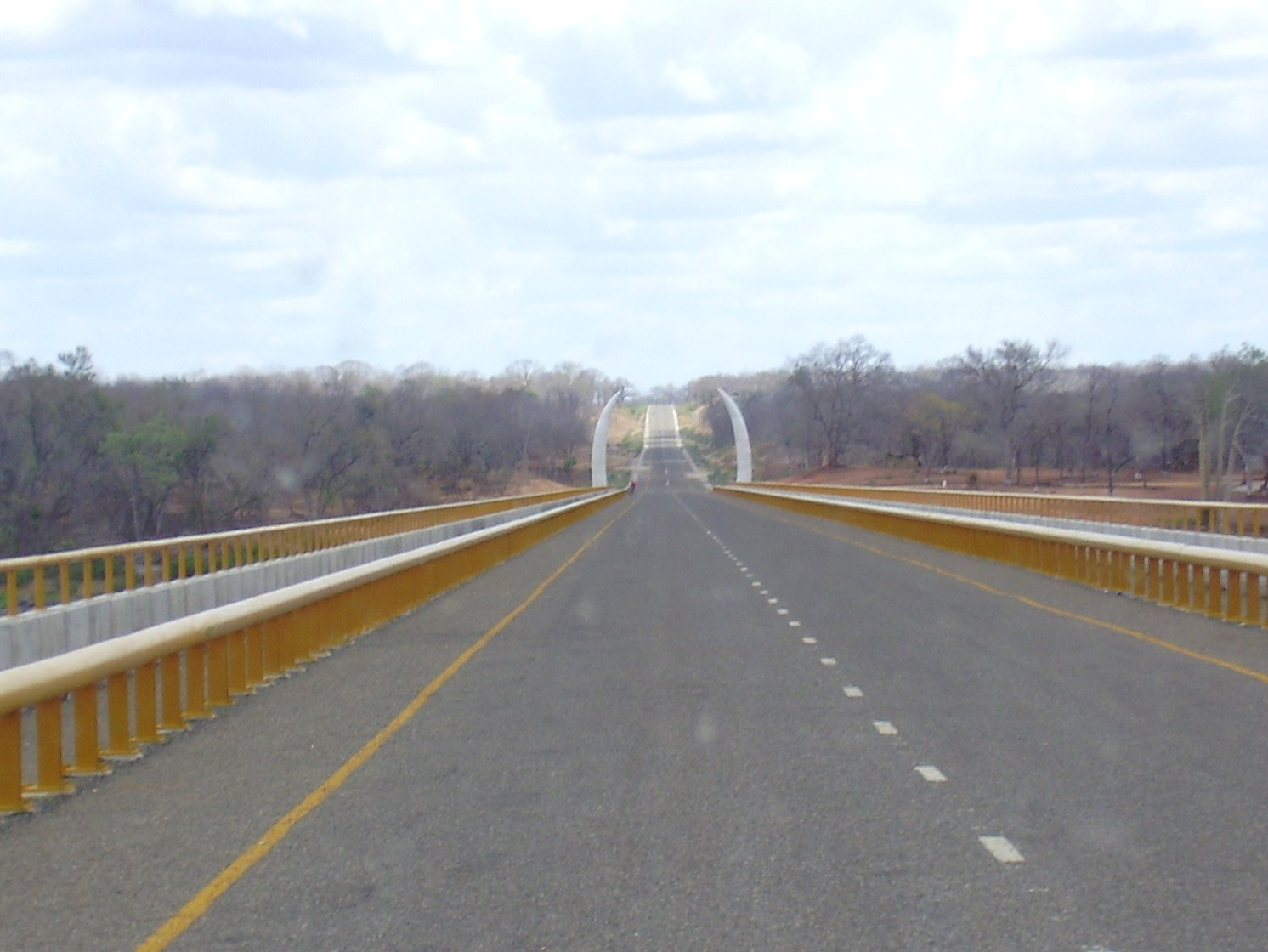
The Unity Bridge during the day time.

The Unity Bridge spans across the Ruvuma river from Tanzania to Mozambique. It was a dream of the two former presidents of the country Julius Nyerere of Tanzania and Samora Machel of Mozambique. Plans for the bridge were inked in 2005 and it was completed five years later in 2010. A border post was constructed in Negomano and is the first bridge to span between the two countries. The Bridge was crucial to the Mtwara Development Corridor project as it connected the two major highways in the region and was the key to cross border trade between the countries. The bridge also provides a road link between Mtwara port and Malawi. Plans are underway to create a second bridge, Unity Bridge 2 180 kilometres (110 mi) south of Songea. The bridge would connect Kivikoni in the Songea Rural district, to Lupilichi, Mozambique.

== Port infrastructure ==
=== Mtwara Port ===
The port will be accompanied with an export processing zone to help fast track the regional economy and bring in revenue for the port. The special zone saw an investment of over $700,000 in December 2015 from the Dar es Salaam-based firm Alistar Free Ports Limited. Over 100 hectares (250 acres) have been set for an industrial zone and over 400 hectares (990 acres) have been set for oil/gas activities.

=== Lake Nyasa Ports ===
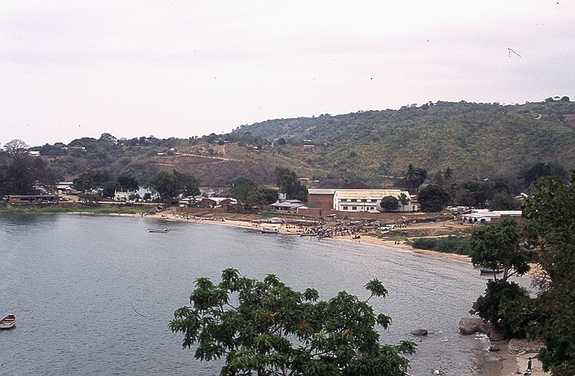
Aerial view of the Nkhata Bay in Malawi in 1998

With the development of the road and rail links, the transport corridor can provide an alternative route for goods moving in and out of Malawi. The development plan involves upgrading both Mbamba Bay in Tanzania and Nkhata Bay in Malawi. The project will also involve purchasing high capacity ferries to move cargo and passengers between the terminals.

== Economy ==
=== Mining operations ===
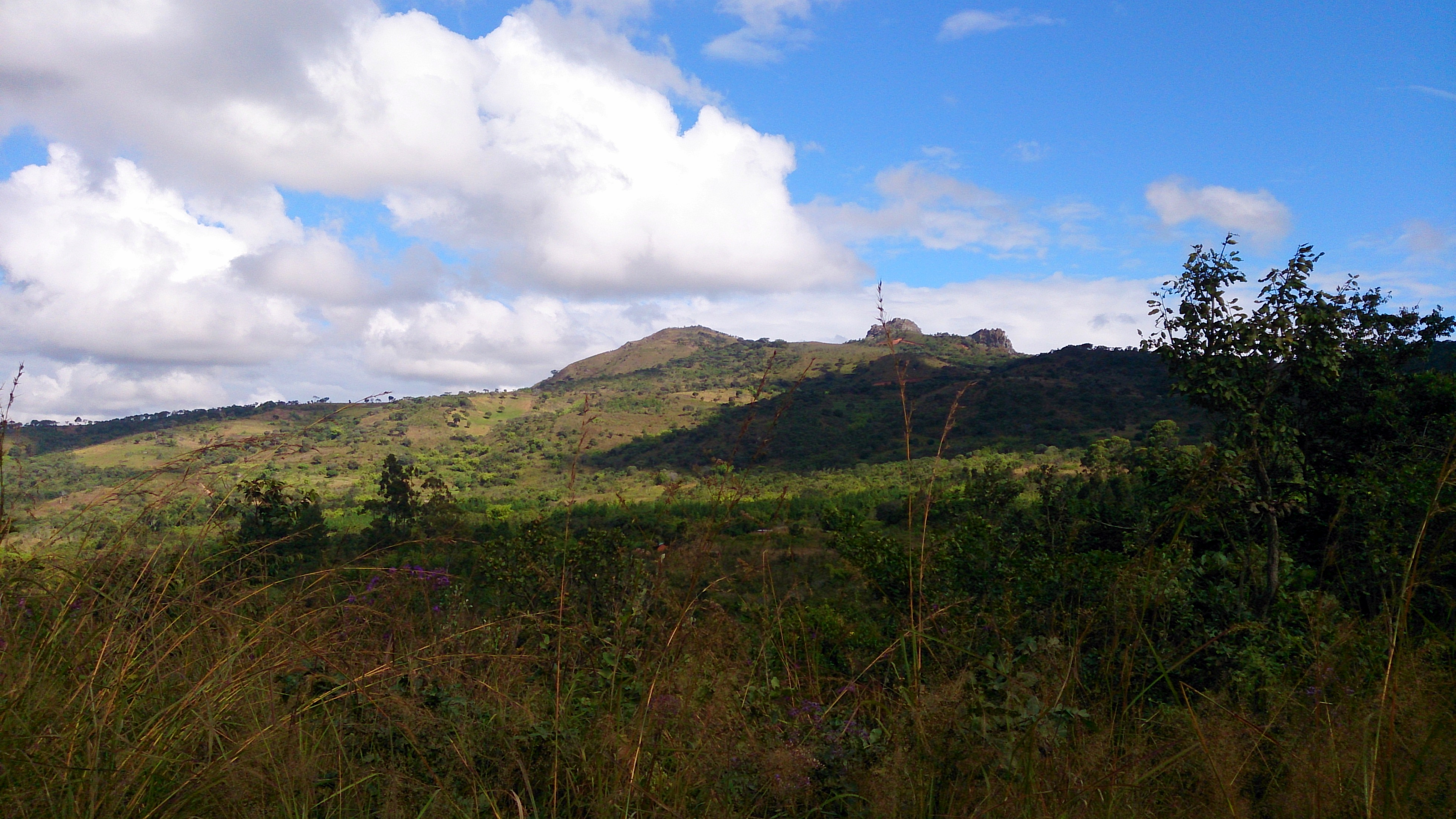
Linganga iron mountains

Exploration works in Mchuchuma have Liganga concluded that there is over 364 million tonnes of coal and 219 million tonnes of iron ore deposits at the twin projects. These have one of the largest estimates of iron ore deposits in the country and the mines are estimated to operate well over 100 years and will continue to foster and develop the regional economy. The Liganga Mines are also known to be rich in Vanadium and Titanium and its plausibility is still being explored.

Mining operations in the region especially with coal have already kicked off, TANCOAL Energy Limited (a joint venture of NDC and Intra Energy Corporation of Australia) has been conducting coal mining operations in the region and have already started to sell the coal domestically. In 2014/2015 the company managed to extract over 300,000 tonnes of coal and sells most of its coal locally to the domestic cement manufacturers. The construction of the rail link will help export the coal through the Mtwara Port.

The Mchuchuma coal projects are set to begin operations in 2016 as per the Ministry for Trade and Industry. The TSh 5 trillion is project under the Tanzania China International Mineral Resources Ltd (TCIMRL), a joint venture between the National Development Corporation (NDC) and the Chinese firm Sichuan Hongda Group. It is categorized as the largest single industrial investment since Tanzania was awarded its independence in 1961. The project is expected to create 32,000 direct jobs and will bring Tanzania to being the third largest producer of iron in Africa.

=== Energy generation ===
The Mtwara corridor is currently disconnected from the national grid and energy in the region is dependent on outlying thermal power plants. The growing mining operations and the expansion of industry in Mtwara will need reliable energy supply. To power the Coal and Iron operations the state energy firm TANESCO plans to construct a 600MW coal fired power plant of which 250MW will be used by the Iron industry and the remaining 350MW will be fed into the national grid. The recent discoveries of natural gas in the region will facilitate another 600MW gas fired power plant in Mtwara to feed to the nearby region and into the national grid. The power plant project will also involve the extension of transmission lines from Mtwara to Songea to ensure the entire southern region is connected to the grid. The kick off of these projects will bring a massive surplus in energy and in the future, the southern region governments plan to extend the transmission lines into Mozambique and Malawi.

== Environmental concerns ==
The southern part of Tanzania and northern Mozambique are home to vast natural reserves such as the Selous Game Reserve and the Niassa Reserve. The border of Tanzania and Mozambique is drawn by the Ruvuma River and the regions around it has been named the Great Ruvuma Wilderness (GROW) by the wildlife community. The wildness is the last great wilderness of Africa and is home to various important species of large mammals and marine life. Due to large amounts of poverty and lack of development in the area the region's population relies on the natural habitat for survival. The construction of the infrastructure projects have led to various abuses of the natural environment. The construction of the new roads and the Unity Bridge in recent years has increased the amount of illegal logging in the region. The Niassa reserve where the Unity bridge goes through is home to 43% of Mozambique's elephants and in the past three years it has been estimated that 2/3 of the elephants have been lost. The road rehabilitation projects have also caused various unplanned settlements to spring up, interfering with the wildlife's natural movement patterns.

== See also ==
- Unity Bridge
- Tanzania Ports Authority
- Tanzania Railways Limited
