= Bagamoyo Port =

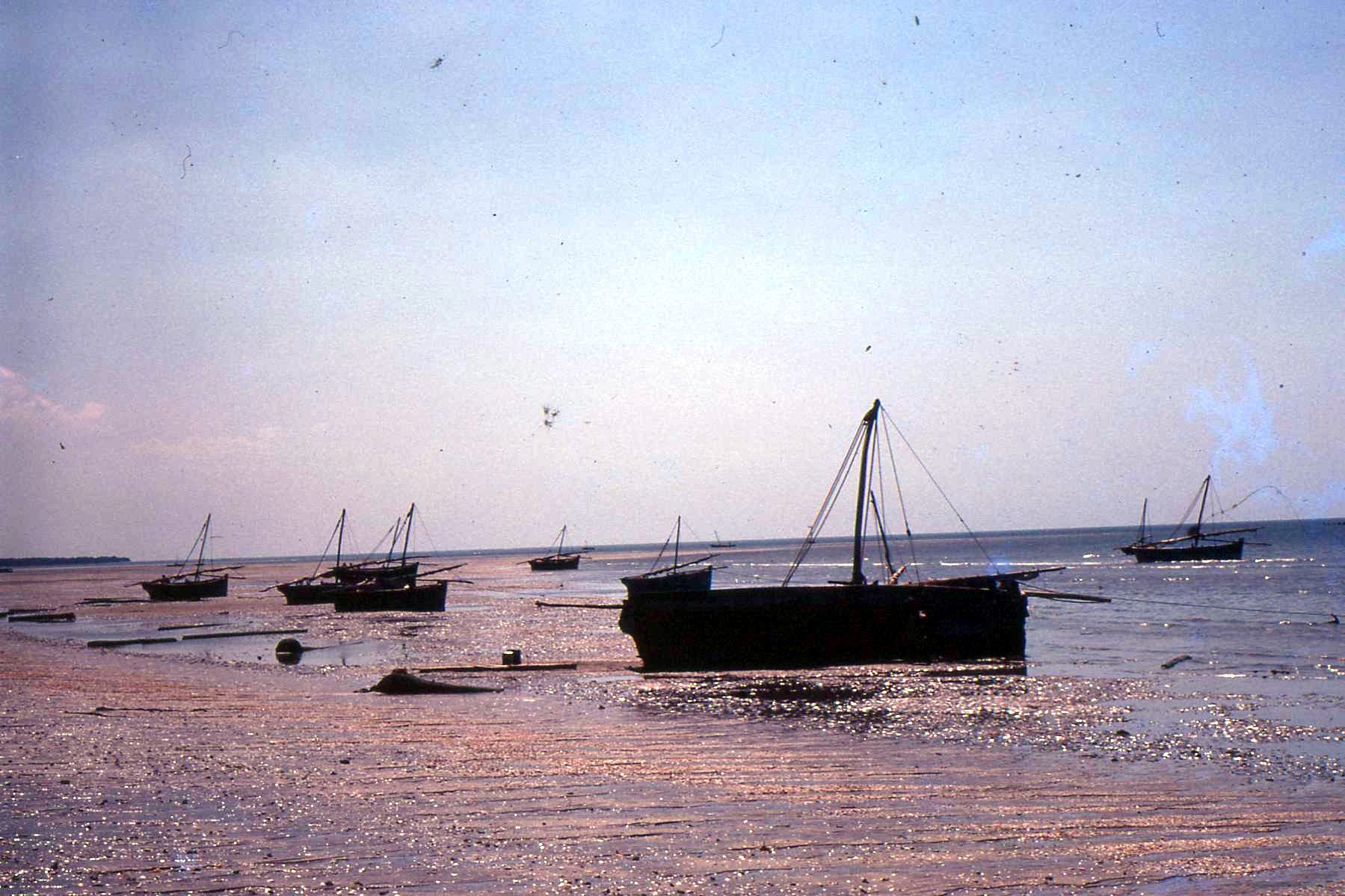
- The dhows on the Bagamoyo Indian Ocean shoreline.
- Interactive map of Bagamoyo Port
- Location within Tanzania

Location
- Country: Tanzania
- Location: Bagamoyo
- Coordinates: 6.432933°S 38.903804°E

Details
- Opened: 2017
- Operated by: Tanzania Ports Authority
- Owned by: Government of Tanzania
- Type of Harbor: Natural/Artificial
- Size: 800 ha
- Project Cost: US$ 10 Billion

Statistics
- Website www.ports.go.tz

The Bagamoyo Port or Port of Bagamoyo (Bandari ya Bagamoyo, in Swahili) is one of the oldest ports in Tanzania. The port is located in the town of Bagamoyo in Bagamoyo District of Pwani Region. The port was once a main entry from the Zanzibar Channel to Bagamoyo Historic Town before the establishment and rise of the Port of Dar es Salaam in the 1860s. Reconstruction and mass expansion of the Port of Bagamoyo is set to be constructed in the mid 2020s. It is planned to be one of the largest government infrastructure projects in the country. The Bagamoyo port and its affiliate industrial zone is meant to address congestion at the old port and support Tanzania to become East Africa’s leading shipping and logistics centre.

== History ==
Bagamayo port was once one of the largest ports in Africa and was a hub of the east African maritime trade from the fifteenth century to the nineteenth century. The Tanzanian government sought to develop a modern port and in 2013 President of Tanzania Jakaya Kikwete and General Secretary of the Chinese Communist Party Xi Jinping announced that the development project would be led by China Merchants Group.

Construction of the port development began in 2015. Construction stalled after a new Tanzanian government came into office. After Samia Suluhu Hassan became Tanzania's president in 2021, she stated Tanzania's intent to revive the project.

== Plan ==
The port is set to handle 20 million teu by 2045 and would be the largest port in East Africa when completed. The port is to handle 25 times the amount of cargo of Dar es Salaam Port and would help reduce congestion there. The project also involves the construction of a Special economic zone adjacent to the port. Also to be constructed around Bagamoyo area are over 190 industries, including the manure processing industry that will be put up by the government of Oman. When fully developed, the Bagamoyo Special Economic Zone will attract about 700 industries to become a strategic investment zone in East Africa. The Chinese and Oman firms were supposed to invest in the project, but they dropped out. Other foreign companies have shown interest to invest in the project.In 2025, Saudi Arabia announced that it would buy and construct the port.

== Special Economic Zone ==
The project also includes a 1700 ha special industrial zone. The special economic zone is funded by the Government of Tanzania and the State government reserve fund from Oman. The port is being constructed by China and the industrial zone will be constructed by Oman and administered by Export Processing Zone Authority of Tanzania. The industrial zone will also have rail links to the TAZARA Railway (1,067 mm (3 ft 6 in)), old Tanzanian Central Railway (1,000 mm (3 ft 3 3/8 in)) and new SGR (1,435 mm (4 ft 8 1/2 in)).

== Stalling since 2019 ==
In 2019 the Tanzanian government under President Magufuli entered into new negotiations about the ratification of the project. He was reported to have called the conditions "exploitative". In May 2019 Tanzania Ports Authority's (TPA) director general Deusdedit Kakoko declared that the negotiations have stalled "because investors’ conditions were likely to deny Tanzania maximum benefit from the project", pointing to demands for tax exemption and compensation for any losses incurred during implementation of the project. In April 2020 a Kenyan newsite reported that Tanzania had cancelled the project, which was not commented on by official sources. Ever since the president had declared plans of reviving the project, many investors have shown interest. In September 2022, it was announced that the construction of the port will be commenced by the Government of Tanzania in 2023, and the investors will join in later.

== See also ==
- Tanzania Ports Authority
- Transport in Tanzania
- China Merchants Port
