= Coal in Tanzania =

Coal mining and consumption in Tanzania

The production of coal in Tanzania has largely been underdeveloped for many years. Tanzania has an estimated 1.5 billion tonnes of reserves and is believed to have the largest reserves of coal in East Africa. In 2015, Tanzania produced in excess of 250,000 tonnes of coal, of which 94% of it was consumed domestically.

== Geology ==
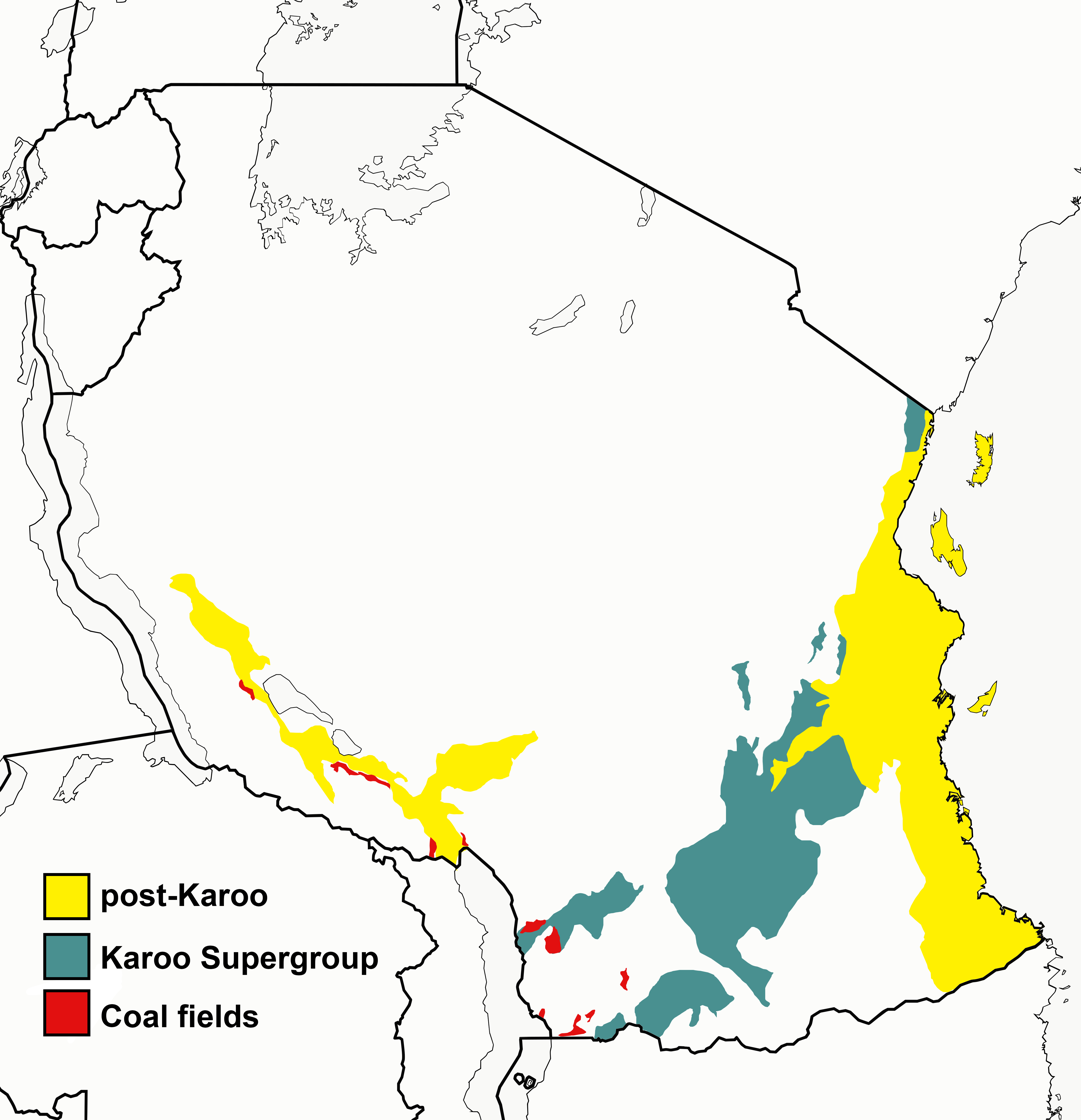
The distribution of Karoo Supergroup formations and coal fields in Southern Tanzania

The majority of the coal reserves in Tanzania exist along the Songea Karoo belt in Southern Tanzania. Coal fields exist in three regions of the country in Rukwa, Mbeya and the largest in Njombe.

The country has total coal reserves of around 1.9bn tonnes with 0.4 billion tonnes of proven reserves. With recent geological exploration, the authorities believe there is a potential of 5 billion tonnes of potential reserves.

The largest reserves are currently found in Mchuchuma, where there are reserves of over 400 million tonnes.

== Operational mines ==
Currently there are only two small scale operations that are extracting coal.

=== Kiwira Coal Mine ===
The Kiwira coal mine is a small coal mine operational in the new region of Songwe with an annual installed capacity of 150,000 tonnes. The Kiwira Coal & Power Company owns the licence to mine at the Ivogo Ridge. The company is wholly owned by the State Mining Corporation that is 100% owned by the Government of Tanzania.

=== Ngaka Coal Mine ===
The Ngaka coal mine in Ruvuma Region is operated under the banner of Tancoal Energy which is a joint venture between Intra Energy Tanzania limited and the state owned National Development Corporation (NDC). The Ngaka coal mine is currently the largest operational mine in the country and is selling an upwards of 250,000 tonnes of unwashed coal annually. There have reports about health impact of coal mining to neighbouring residents in Ruanda Ward.

== Misinformation on Coal in Tanzania ==
There has been misinformation about coal in Tanzania on social media that claims there is an increase demand of Tanzania coal green energy policies in Europe.

== Export ==
Tanzania has exported coal to different countries including China, Kenya, Netherlands, India, Senegal, Egypt, Europe, Amsterdam, Ghana and Ivory Coast.
