= Mtwara Port =

Port of Mtwara
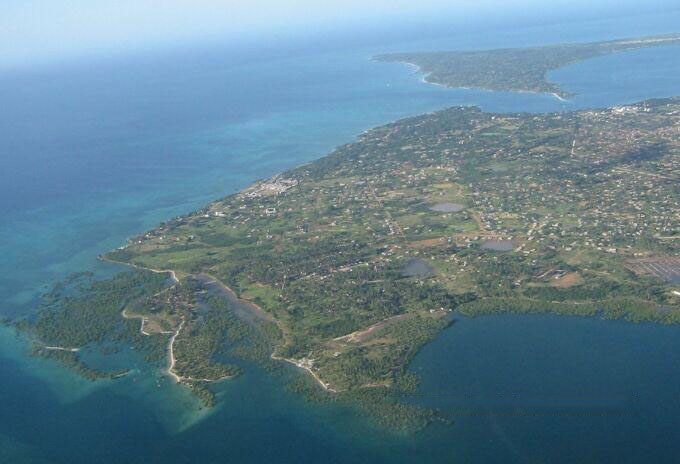
- An aerial view of Mtwara Town.
- Interactive map of Port of Mtwara
- Location within Tanzania Location within Africa

Location
- Country: Tanzania
- Location: Mtwara
- Coordinates: 10°16′7.8″S 40°11′52.5″E
- UN/LOCODE: TZMYW

Details
- Opened: 1950
- Operated by: Tanzania Ports Authority
- Owned by: Government of Tanzania
- Type of Harbor: Natural
- No. of berths: 2
- Employees: 220 (2012)
- Port Manager: Hebel Mwasenga
- Channel depth: 10m

Statistics
- Vessel arrivals: ▼99 (2016)
- Annual cargo tonnage: ▼273,000 (2016)
- Annual container volume: ▲14,337 (2016)
- Website; Port authority website

The Mtwara Port was built during the British Colonial times in the city of Mtwara in southern Tanzania. The harbor at the Port of Mtwara was deepened during the colonial times by the British in 1948-1954, and a railway line was built connecting the port, as part of the Tanganyika groundnut scheme. Due to the failure of the scheme the port immediately lost value and the railway line was removed. The port was functional but underutilized for many years due to poor transport infrastructure, However, in the years of 2010-2011 the increased activity in oil and gas natural resources energy exploration caused a surge on operations. The Mtwara port is also an integral part of the Mtwara Development Corridor project and has recently seen major upgrades. The port also has a special economic zone attached to it and In December 2015 Alistair Freeports Limited injected $700,000 to upgrade the Export processing zone around the port area.

== Operations ==
The port has historically handled very little cargo due to the lack of large industries in the area. The major export out of the port has always been cashew nuts. The Port has a quay wall of 385m and can handle two ships and one ocean ship at once. Previously the port could only dock ships of length up to 175m however with recent renovations in 2015, the port could dock a 209m ship in February 2015. The port handles 400,000 metric tonnes of cargo annually and constitutes to less than 5% of the total countries cargo movement, however, the government plans to upgrade the port drastically to facilitate trade in the southern part of the country.

== The Mtwara Development Corridor ==
The harbour is an integral part of the Mtwara Development Corridor project. The infrastructure around the port is currently being development to help facilitate more cargo to be handled at the port. The port is destined to be an alternative cargo gateway for cargo bound for southern Tanzania, Malawi, Eastern Zambia and Northern Mozambique. Furthermore, for the success and growth of the major coal and iron mining projects such as the Mchucuma Iron Mine and the Liganga mine they need to be able to handle high capacity bulk loads to facilitate exports through the port.

== See also ==
- Tanzania Ports Authority
