= Ligunga =

- Village
- Location within Tanzania
- Coordinates: 11°17′S 36°25′E
- Country: Tanzania
- Region: Ruvuma Region
- Elevation: 891 m (2,923 ft)
- Time zone: UTC+3 (EAT)

Ligunga is a town in southern Tanzania near the border with Mozambique.

== Transport ==
In October 2007, it was proposed to railway to Ligunga to Mlimba and from Ligunga via Mchuchuma to Mbamba Bay on Lake Malawi.

== Access ==
Liganga lies in a gap in the mountains that provides better than average access to Lake Malawi. This gap follows the course of the Ruvuma River, which forms the border between Tanzania and Mozambique.

== See also ==
- Transport in Tanzania
