= Unity Bridge =

Bridge across Ruvuma River at Negomano, Mozambique

Unity Bridge: Daraja la Umoja (Swahili); Ponte da Unidade (Portuguese)
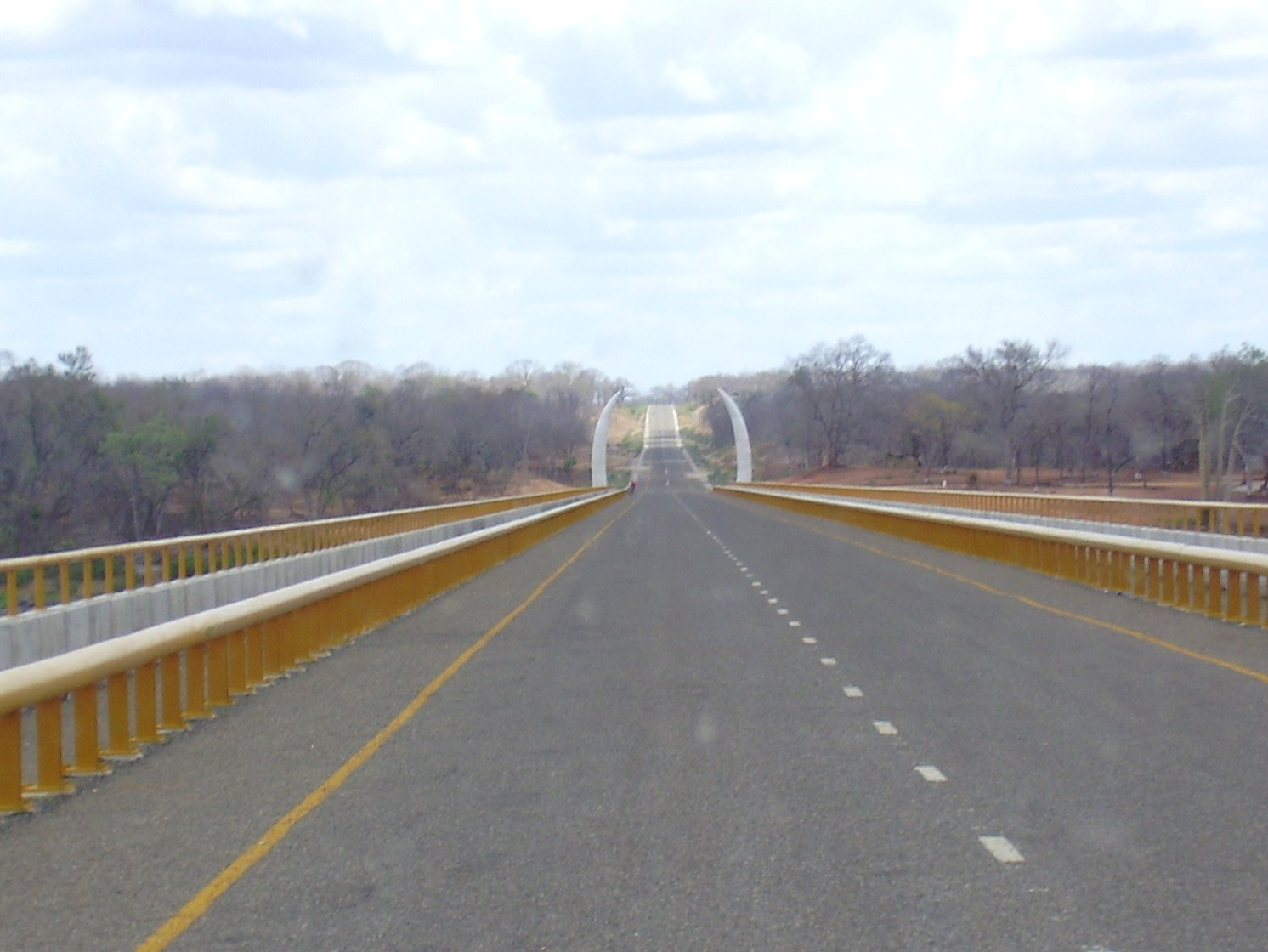
- Coordinates: 11°24′52″S 38°29′39″E
- Carries: 2 lanes
- Crosses: Ruvuma River
- Locale: Negomano, Mozambique; Mtambaswala, Tanzania
- Other name: Unity Bridge 1

Characteristics
- Design: Box girder bridge
- Material: Prestressed concrete; Reinforced concrete
- Total length: 720 metres (2,360 ft)
- Width: 13.8 metres (45 ft)
- Height: up to 10 metres (33 ft)
- No. of spans: 18

History
- Designer: Norconsult
- Constructed by: China Geo-Engineering Corporation
- Construction start: 16 October 2005
- Construction cost: US$ 35 million
- Inaugurated: 12 May 2010

Location
- Interactive map of Unity Bridge

The Unity Bridge (sometimes called "Unity Bridge 1") across Ruvuma River at Negomano, Mozambique, between Tanzania and Mozambique, was proposed as early as 1975, shortly after Mozambique's independence. It was the idea of the two countries' former Presidents, Mwalimu Nyerere and Samora Machel. Several design studies and limited construction work were completed in the early 1980s, but the Unity Bridge was not finished due to lack of funds.

In 2002, the two national governments made a formal agreement to build a new bridge across the river. The first foundation stones were laid both on Tanzanian and Mozambican sides on October 10, 2005. Construction was initially planned to be finished in 2008.

In 2005, Norconsult was awarded the contract for preliminary design and construction supervision of the bridge. It was planned to be about 720 m long.

The project was hoped to boost development in Mtwara Region (Tanzania), Cabo Delgado (Mozambique) as well as in the Southern African Development Community region as it is an important component of the Mtwara Development Corridor. It would also shorten the distance along the Cape to Cairo Road.

Environmentalists say it will destroy Niassa Reserve in Mozambique which is home to elephant, buffalo, sable and roan herds.

The Unity Bridge over the Rovuma River was built by the China Geo-Engineering Corporation with COWI as consultants for the detailed design and finally inaugurated on 12 May 2010 by the presidents of Mozambique and Tanzania.

The rehabilitation of access roads on both sides of the bridge is to be started. A second, smaller bridge, Unity 2, was completed in 2007.

== See also ==
- Friendship Bridge (disambiguation) - an alternate name
- Mtwara Development Corridor
- List of international bridges
