= Port of Tanga =

Tanga Port
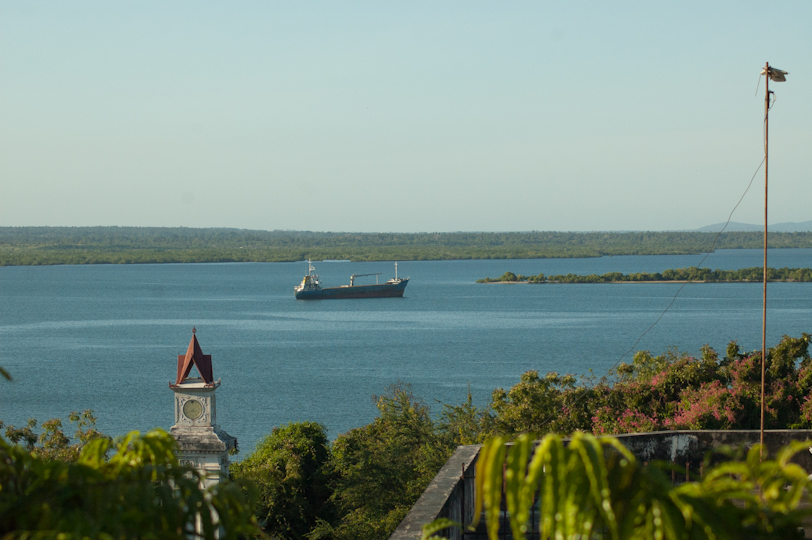
- A ship anchored in the Tanga Bay
- Interactive map of Tanga Port
- Location within Tanzania

Location
- Country: Tanzania
- Location: Port Road, Central, Tanga, Tanga Region
- Coordinates: 5°3′57.6″S 39°6′20″E
- UN/LOCODE: TZTGT

Details
- Operated by: Tanzania Ports Authority
- Owned by: Tanzanian Government
- Type of Harbor: Natural
- No. of berths: 2

Statistics
- Vessel arrivals: ▼86 (2016)
- Annual cargo tonnage: ▲677,000 (2016)
- Capacity: 1,200,000 tons p.a.
- Website www.tanzaniaports.com

The Port of Tanga (Bandari ya Tanga in Swahili) is the second largest port in Tanzania. It is located on Tanga Bay in Central ward of Tanga District of Tanga Region.

== History ==
Historically the port city part of the Portuguese and Arab gateway for the slave and ivory trade. In the 1880s, the region fell under German control as part of the Tanganyika Territory. During this period, European influence led to the modernization of the city's facilities, and in 1914, the port itself was established. To support the growing maritime activities, a 240-meter quay wall was constructed in 1918. As a gateway for exports from northern Tanzania, including sisal, coffee, and cotton, the port played a vital role. Its connectivity expanded as the Usambara railway extended westward, linking the port to Moshi by rail. Following World War I, the territory came under British control, and in 1954, the British authorities constructed a second quay wall, measuring 141 meters in length, further enhancing the port's capabilities.

=== Post Colonial ===
Following Tanzania's Ujamaa policies, which resulted in declining agricultural productivity in the country, the port experienced a decline in its significance. Despite this, it remained the second largest port in Tanzania. To stimulate post activities and generate revenue, the government permitted fuel consignments to be imported through the port of Tanga.

Recognizing the need to relieve strain on the Dar-es-Salaam port, in 2017, the Tanzanian government made the decision to expand the facilities of the Tanga port. This expansion project, initiated over a century after the port's initial development, involved the construction of new walls, dredging work, and the acquisition of new port machinery. These measures successfully increased the port's capacity from handling 700,000 tons per year to 1.2 million tons, thereby enhancing its overall capabilities.

== Port Facilities ==
The port of Tanga features a contemporary quay wall spanning a total length of 450 meters, encompassing berth one and two. Presently, there are two offshore pipelines, each with a diameter of 12 inches, dedicated to the efficient handling of liquid bulk, specifically oil products. Additionally, at Totten Island, a Conventional Buoy Mooring (CBM) system through the use of flexible hoses connected to submarine pipelines is in place to facilitate the safe and effective handling of Liquefied Petroleum Gas (LPG).

== Operations ==
At present, the port is served by three shipping lines: Delmas, Mitsui O.S.K. Lines and Inchcape.

== Tanzania-Uganda Pipeline ==
On 6 March 2016 Tanzania president John Magufuli and Uganda president Yoweri Museveni agreed to construct the Tanzania-Uganda oil pipeline at the 17th East African Heads of State summit in Arusha . As of 2016, the pipeline was to run for 1,400 km from Lake Albert basin to the port of Tanga. The pipeline was initially agreed to run from Uganda to Kenya to the Lamu Port and Lamu-Southern Sudan-Ethiopia Transport Corridor. The pipeline was to cost over $4 billion and to provide 1,500 direct jobs across the region. The three companies with a stake in the project are Total S.A., China National Offshore Oil Corporation and Tullow Oil, who preferred the Tanzanian route due to safety concerns in the Kenyan Northern corridor. The construction was to begin in August 2016 and will take two years to build.
