= Tanzania Ports Authority =

Public corporation in Tanzania

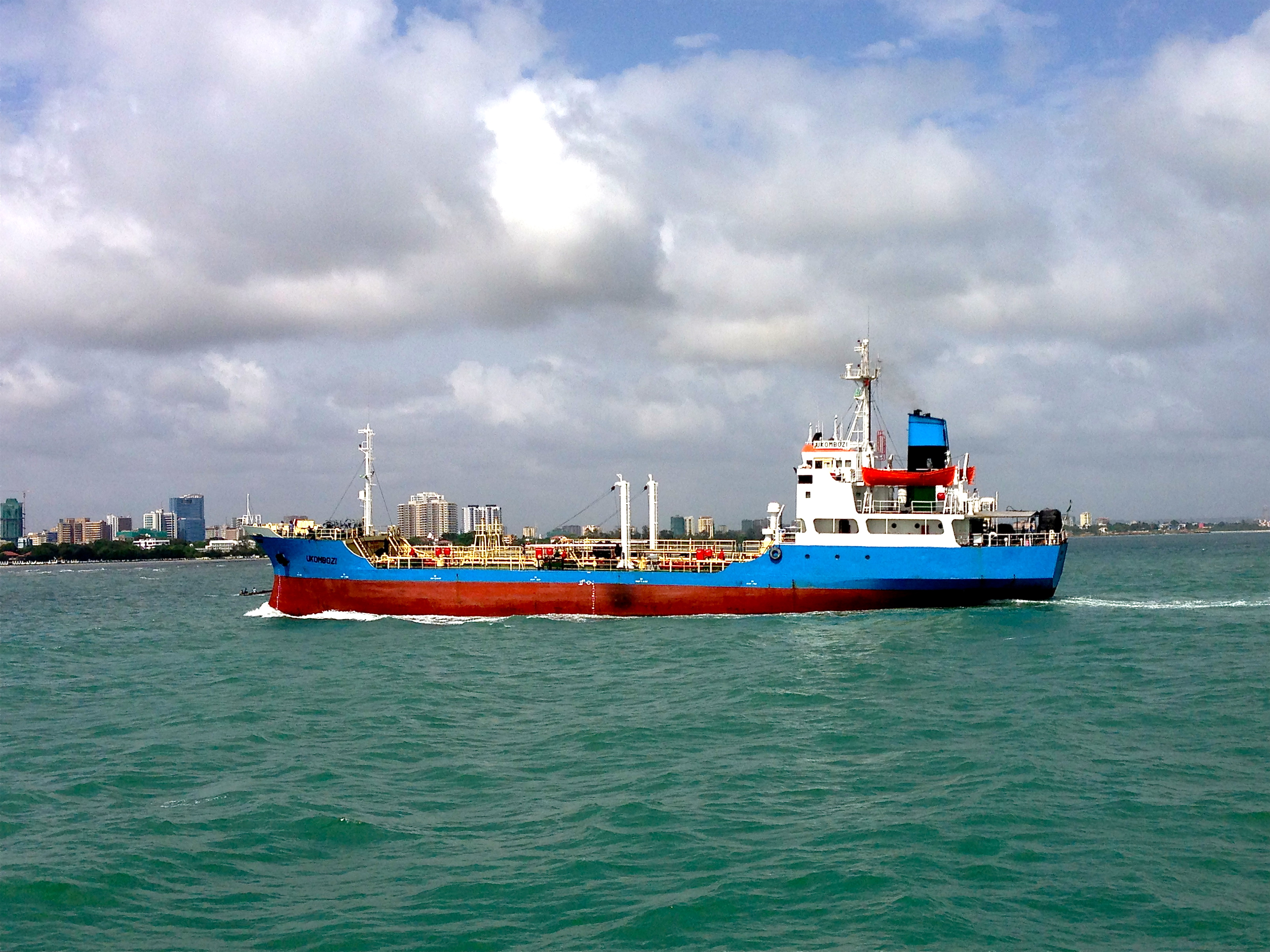
- A ship entering the Dar es Salaam port

Government agency overview
- Formed: 2005
- Type: Government agency
- Jurisdiction: All ocean and lake ports in Tanzania
- Headquarters: Tanzania Port Authority Tower, 1Julius Nyerere road, Mchafukoge, Ilala District, Dar es Salaam, Tanzania
- Employees: 3,470(2014)
- Minister responsible: Hon. Eng.Dr.Leonard Chamuriho, Minister of Works and Transport
- Government agency executive: Plasduce Mkeli Mbosa , Director General
- Website: www.tanzaniaports.com

Tanzania Ports Authority (TPA) is a parastatal public corporation acting under the aegis of the Ministry of Infrastructure Development, that has the responsibility "to manage and operate" the ocean ports and lake ports of the country of Tanzania. The Tanzania Ports Authority headquarters are located in Mchafukoge ward of Ilala District in Dar es Salaam Region. It is a member of the Port Management Association of Eastern and Southern Africa.

Map of the 13 ports operated by the Tanzania Ports Authority
Major Sea Ports
Major Lake Ports
Minor Sea Ports
Port Under Construction

== History ==
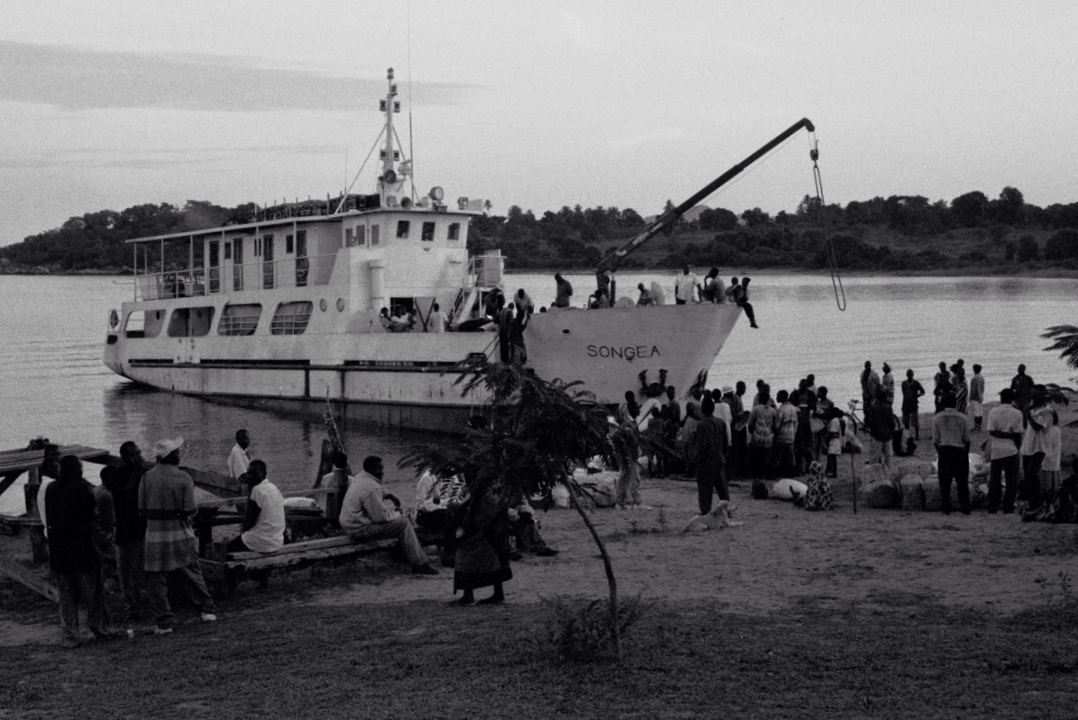
MV Songea, owned by the East African Railways and Harbours Corporation, operating on Lake Nyasa

=== Colonial period ===
The first formal commercial ports developed in German East Africa was the Tanga Port connected to the Usambara Railway in 1883 and the Dar es Salaam Port connected to the Tanzania Central Railway in 1905. The ports were controlled directly by the railway authorities throughout the colonial period. In 1947 the British government formed the East African Railways and Harbours Corporation. The corporation was formed by merging the Kenya and Uganda Railways and Harbours with the Tanganyika Railway and all Tanganyikan ports and harbours.

=== East African community ===
After the independence of the respective east African countries the East African Railways and Harbours Corporation continued to facilitate its mandate on the railways and ports until 1967. After 1967 the East African Community decided to separate the Railways and the Harbours Corporation, and in 1969 the East African Harbours Corporation was formed. The East African Harbours Corporation had the authority to run and develop the ports in Mombasa and Dar es Salaam. The new company operated for 10 years and ceased operations in 1977 due to the dissolution of the East African Community. Each country formed their respective organisations. In Tanzania, the Tanzania Harbours Authority was formed.

=== Formation of Tanzania Ports Authority ===
The Tanzania Harbours Authority ran operations from 1977 to 2005. In Tanzania Ports Authority was established by the Ports Act No. 17 of 2004 as landlord port authority. The act separated waterway operations between the Tanzanian mainland and Zanzibar and gave TPA the authority over all lake ports on the Tanzanian mainland. The act incorporated the company into a Parastatal and therefore reducing governmental authority over the company.

== Corporate affairs ==
The construction of the new Tanzania Ports Authority headquarters in Mchafukoge, Ilala District of Dar es Salaam

=== Ownership and management ===
The Tanzania Ports Authority is a Parastatal company wholly owned by the Government of Tanzania. The company is managed by a board of 5–8 members and a chairman who is appointed by the president. The organisation comes under the Ministry of Works, Transport and Communication and the ministry has the power to assign board members. The company has a similar management structure to any major company and in addition to this each major ocean and lake port has a port master in charge of operations.

=== Business trends ===
The key trends for the company over recent years are shown below (as at year ending 31 June):

| | 2007 | 2008 | 2009 | 2011 | 2012 | 2013 | 2014 | 2015 | 2016 |
|---|---|---|---|---|---|---|---|---|---|
| Revenue (TSh million) | 149,082 | 163,976 | 194,824 | 306,021 | 377,954 | 417,316 | 502,576 | 544,815 | 600,170 |
| Profits (TSh million) | 35,375 | 37,879 | 60,646 | 72,444 | 72,578 | 111,184 | 190,085 | 147,340 | 127,896 |
| Gross profit margin | N/A | 23.1% | 31.1% | 29.1% | 25.1% | 30.1% | 37.8% | 27.0% | 21.3% |
| Cargo traffic handled (mil. ton) | 8.670 | 8.634 | 8.824 | 10.993 | 12.092 | 13.713 | 15.427 | 16.001 | 15.536 |
| Notes/sources | | | | | | | | | |

=== Headquarters ===
The head office of Tanzania Ports Authority is based in Dar es Salaam Tanzania at the Dar es Salaam Port. In 2015 construction was completed on their new headquarters. The 40-storey building is currently the tallest building in the country and was built by the Estim Construction.

== Ports serving the Indian Ocean ==
The TPA's main three Indian Ocean ports are Dar es Salaam, Mtwara, and Tanga; minor seaports serving coastal traffic include Lindi, Kilwa Masoko, Mafia Island, Bagamoyo, Pangani and Kwale. Only sea ports on the Tanzanian mainland are controlled by TPA, the Port of Zanzibar and the Port of Pemba are administered separately by the Zanzibar Port Corporation.

=== Port of Dar es Salaam ===
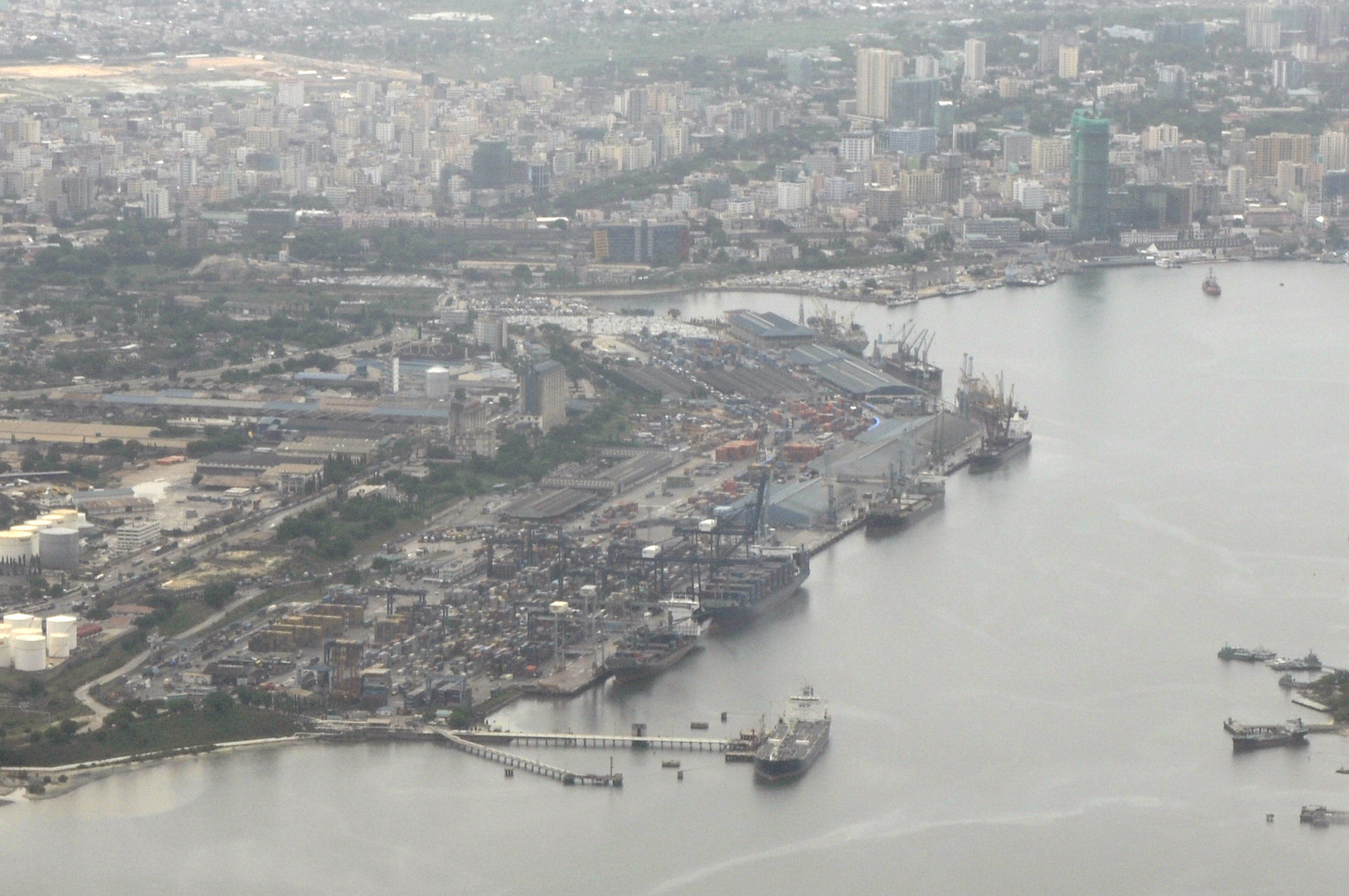
An aerial view of The Port of Dar es Salaam.

This is the principal port of Tanzania and handles 90% of the country's cargo traffic. The port is divided into two parts (TICTS and TPA), to increase efficiency and encourage new challenges to the local port operators the TPA has authorised TICTS privately owned by Hong Kong investors to receive and clear cargo at the port. The Port also provides a vital transit point for cargo from multiple neighbouring landlocked countries. Almost 35 percent of all cargo moving through the port is transit cargo. The port is connected to two railways the Tanzania Central Railway and the TAZARA Railway, but the railways have been depreciating in reliability. The majority of the cargo moves out by road and has been a major bottleneck in expansion plans due to the weak road infrastructure of the city.
Major expansion projects have been set in place to increase the capacity and efficiency of the port. After the construction of the Kigamboni bridge in the city the port plans to create more berths in Kigamboni. Furthermore, the construction of the Bagamoyo mega port has also begun set to help take the load off in 2018.

=== Port of Tanga ===
The Port of Tanga is one of the oldest operating port in the country and was built by the German East Africa Company as the endpoint of the Usambara Railway. The port is the second largest port operating in the country and has an annual capacity of 500,000 tonnes and is running at 90% capacity. The Ports authority has major plans to upgrade the port increase capacity and provide an alternative route for cargo flowing into the country.

=== Port of Mtwara ===
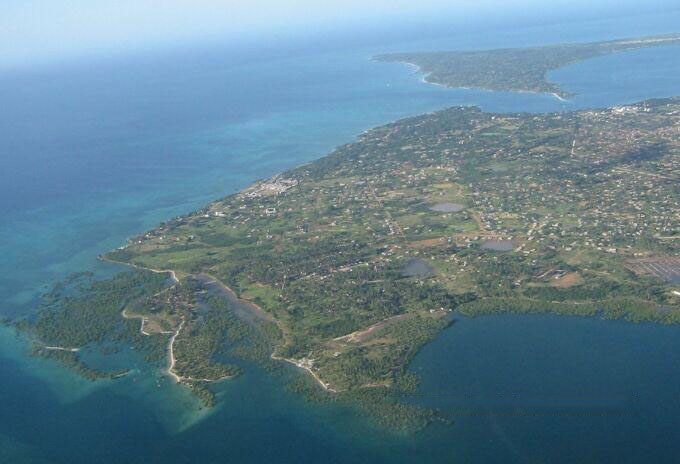
An aerial view of Mtwara Town.

The port of Mtwara was built during the British Colonial times. The harbour at the Port of Mtwara was deepened during 1948–1954, and railway line was built connecting the port, as part of the Tanganyika groundnut scheme. The port was functional but underused for many years due to poor transport infrastructure, However, in 2010–2011, oil and gas exploration activity caused a surge on operations. In December 2015 Alistair Freeports Limited injected $700,000 to construct an export processing zone around the port area.

== Lake ports ==
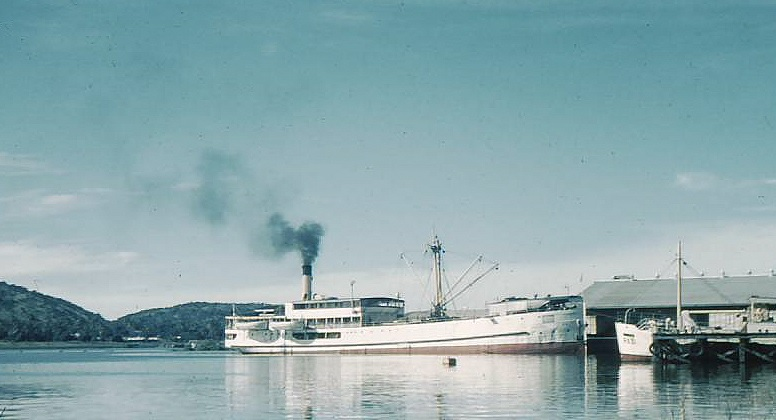
The SS Usoga at the Mwanza Port, 1959

Tanzania Ports Authority operates on three Tanzanian lakes: Lake Victoria, Lake Tanganyika and Lake Nyasa. Most of the lake traffic is passenger traffic and is a lifeline for many of the resident residing around the lakes. Government ferries operating on the lakes are operated by the Marine Services Company.

=== Ports of Lake Victoria ===
TPA's major port in the Lake Victoria region is in Mwanza and TPA maintains an office in Mwanza. Mwanza port handled over 350,000 tonnes of cargo in 2012. TPA is responsible for fifty-eight ports on the lake, the major ports of Mwanza North, Mwanza South, Bukoba, Kemondo Bay, Musoma, Nansio (Ukewere), and Mwaloni (in Mwanza); eight mid-level ports including Chato and Busisi (Sengerema District); as well as forty-three minor ports. The minor ports on the lake have limited passenger and fishing activity, and lack ferry docks, or often any functional docks.

=== Ports of Lake Tanganyika ===
Principal lake ports on Tanganyika include Kigoma and Kasanga, with an office in Kigoma; there are 15 smaller ports along the lake. These ports provide vital trade connections between Burundi, Eastern Democratic Republic of the Congo and Zambia.

=== Ports of Lake Nyasa ===
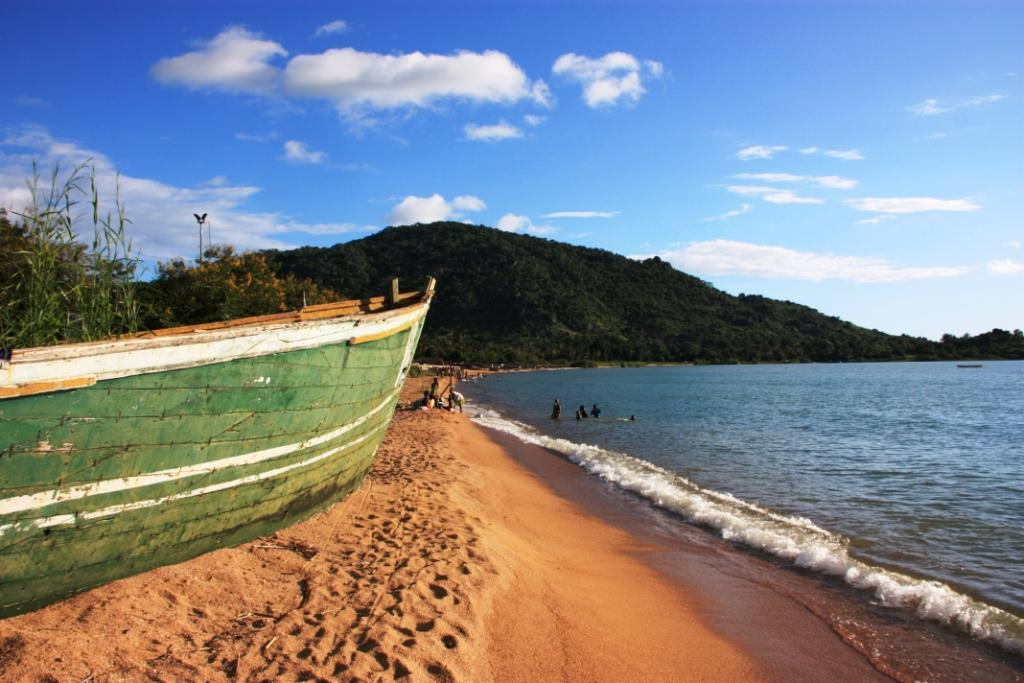
Mbamba Bay, 2012.

Lake Nyasa/Lake Malawi has four important ports, at Itungi, Mbamba Bay, Liuli and Manda; TPA maintains a Kyela District office. There are up to 10 other smaller TPA ports on the lake that facilitate passenger movement along the lake and between the countries of Malawi, Mozambique and Tanzania. The port at Kyela District provides an alternative route for cargo bound of Malawi from the Dar es Salaam Port.

== The Bandari College ==
The Authority operates a maritime college in Dar es Salaam.

== Corruption ==
In December 2015, Tanzania's president, John Magufuli, dissolved the board of the Tanzania port authority and sacked the permanent secretary of the transport ministry. This followed the discovery that over 2,700 shipping containers were smuggled at the Port of Dar es Salaam tax free. The government of Tanzania sacked three port chiefs in three years. On a visit, the Prime Minister found that 349 shipping containers, worth over US$37m, were smuggled without paying government taxes.

== See also ==
- Port authority
- Port operator
- Transport in Tanzania
