= Kidomole =

Town in Tanzania

Kidomole Paradiso ya Pwani
- Motto: "Utu na Uzuri."
- Location in Tanzania
- Coordinates: 6°27′S 38°40′E
- Country: Tanzania
- Region: Pwani Region
- Elevation: 174 ft (53 m)
- Time zone: UTC+3 (East Africa Time)

Kidomole is a town in eastern Tanzania, lying on the coastal plain. Rusako is a township nearby.

== Transport ==
Kidomole has a station on the Tanzanian Railways. In October 2007, it was proposed to build a branch railway from Bagamoyo on the coast to this station.

== See also ==
- Transport in Tanzania
- Railway stations in Tanzania
