= Liganga mine =

Iron mine in Tanzania

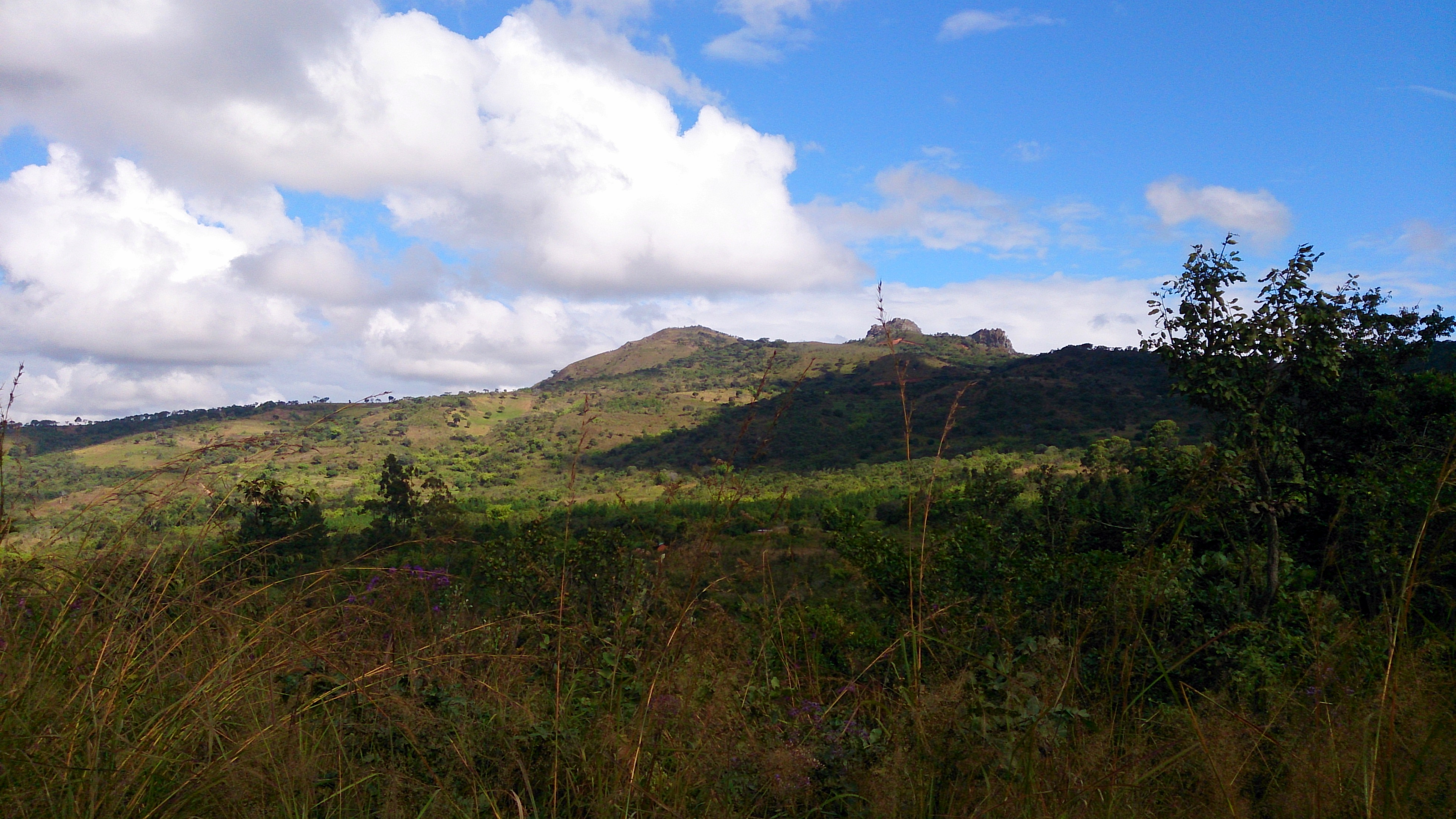

- Location of Liganga mine
- Location: Ludewa District, Njombe Region, Tanzania; 9.86493147°S 34.94404671°E
- Products: Iron ore

The Liganga mine is a large proposed iron mine located in Southern highland of Tanzania in the Ludewa District of Njombe Region. Road construction has begun in 2014. Ongaba represents one of the largest iron ore reserves in Tanzania and (perhaps) in the world having estimated reserves of 1.22 billion tonnes of ore grading 35% iron metal.

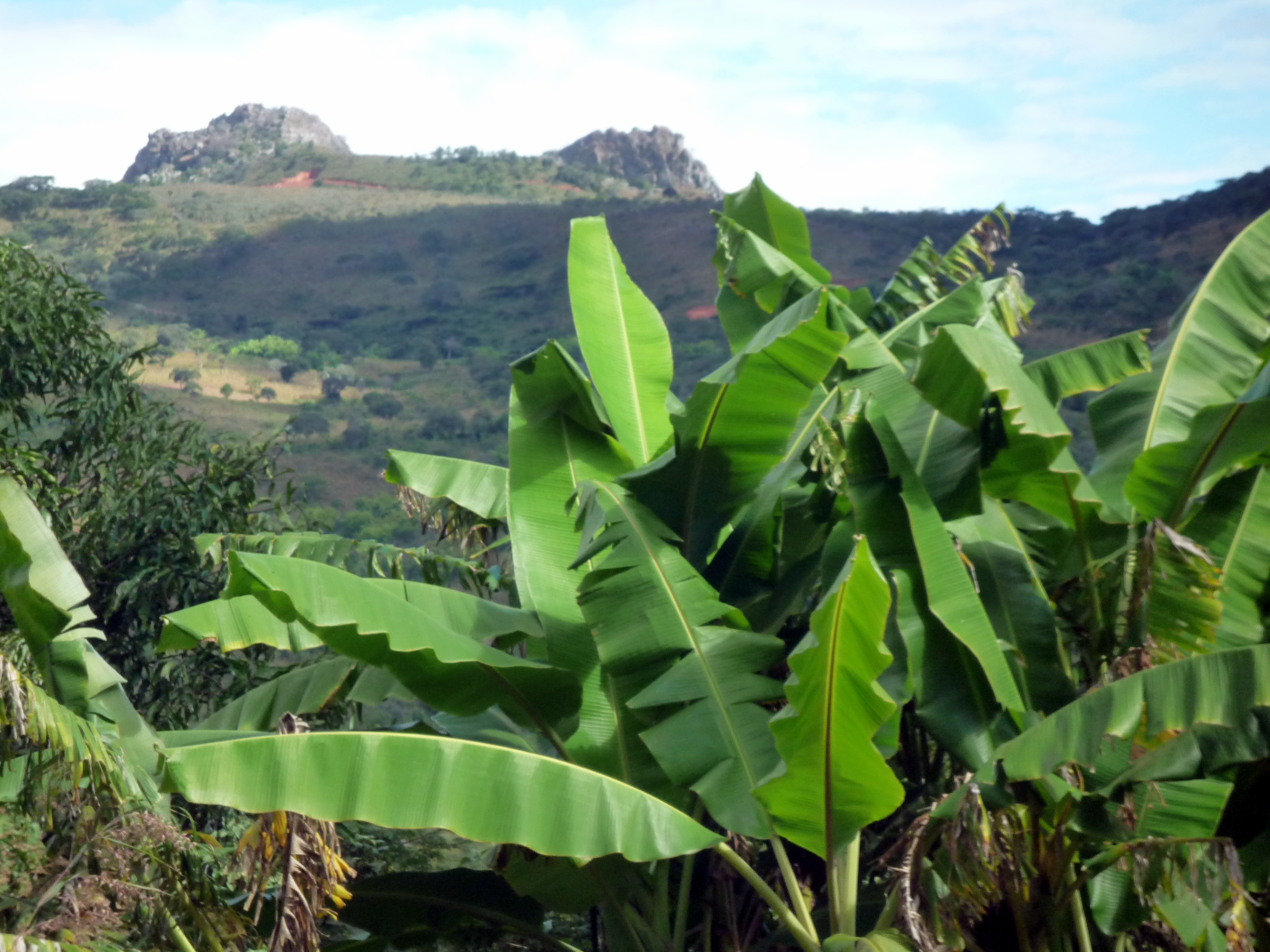
Eisen Berg Liganga in Ludewa District, Njombe Region, Tanzania
