= Port of Dar es Salaam =

Large port located in Dar es Salaam, Tanzania

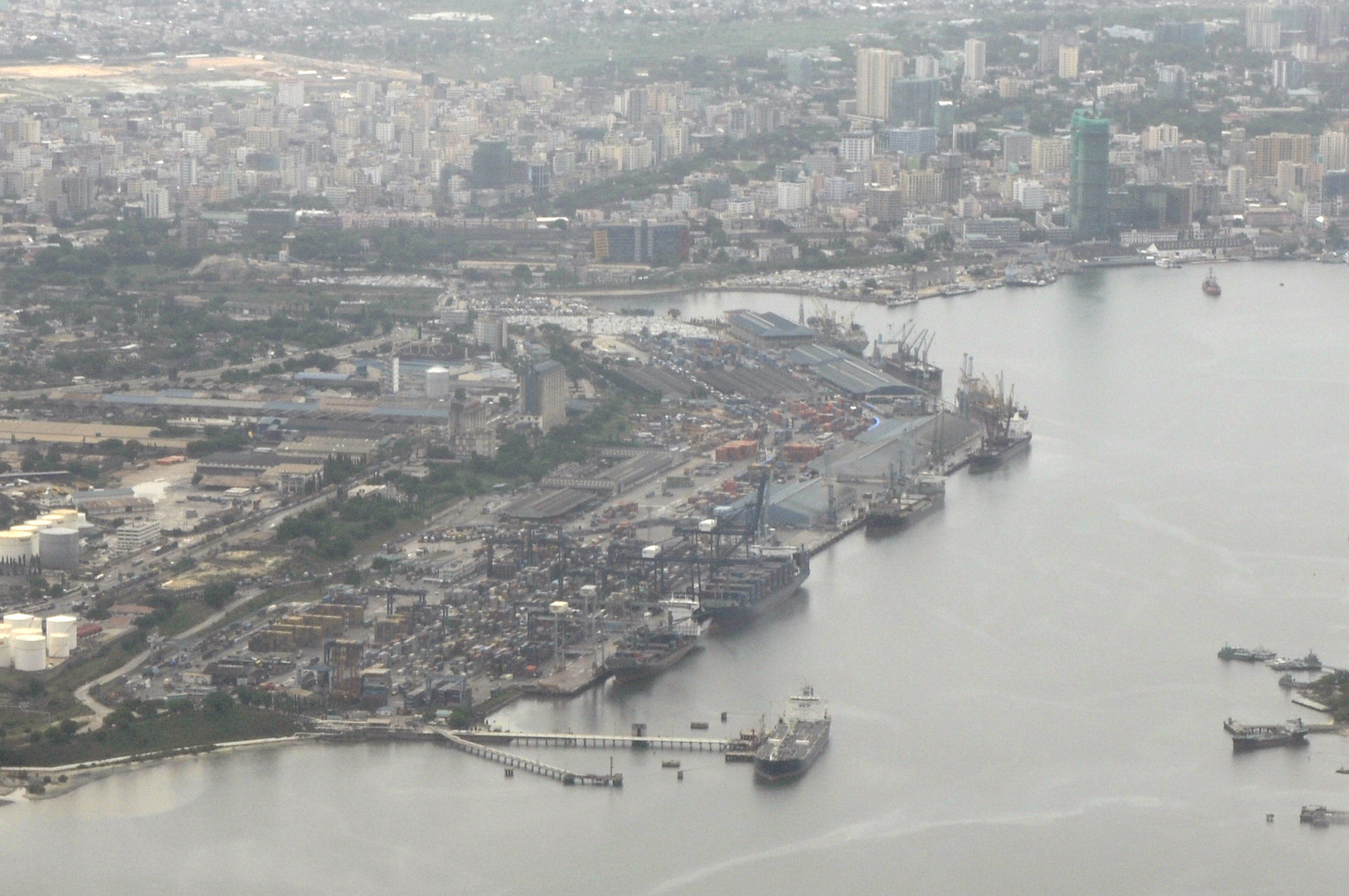
- An aerial view of The Port of Dar es Salaam.
- Interactive map of Port of Dar es Salaam
- Location of the Port of Dar es Salaam. Port of Dar es Salaam (Africa) Port of Dar es Salaam (Earth)

Location
- Country: Tanzania
- Location: Tanzania Port Authority Tower, 1 Nelson Mandela Road, Kurasini, Temeke District, Dar es Salaam, Tanzania
- Coordinates: 6°50′6.40″S 39°17′37.65″E
- UN/LOCODE: TZDAR

Details
- Operated by: Tanzania Ports Authority
- Owned by: Government of Tanzania
- Type of Harbor: Natural
- No. of berths: 11
- No. of wharfs: 4
- Employees: 2,684(2012)
- Port Manager: (Seat Empty)
- Channel depth: 12m

Statistics
- Vessel arrivals: ▲1,518 (2016)
- Annual cargo tonnage: ▼14.3 million (2016)
- Annual container volume: ▼595,109 (2016)
- Value of cargo: ▲US$ 15 billion
- Passenger traffic: ▲1,614,831 (2016)
- Website; Port authority website

The Port of Dar es Salaam (Bandari ya Dar es Salaam, in Swahili) is the principal port serving Tanzania located in Kurasini ward of Temeke District of Dar es Salaam Region. The port is one of three ocean ports in the country and handles over 90% of the country's cargo traffic. According to the International Association of Ports and Harbors, it is the fourth largest port on the African continent's Indian Ocean coastline after Durban, Mombasa and Maputo. The port acts as a gateway for commerce and trade for Tanzania and numerous bordering landlocked states.

== History ==
=== Colonial period ===
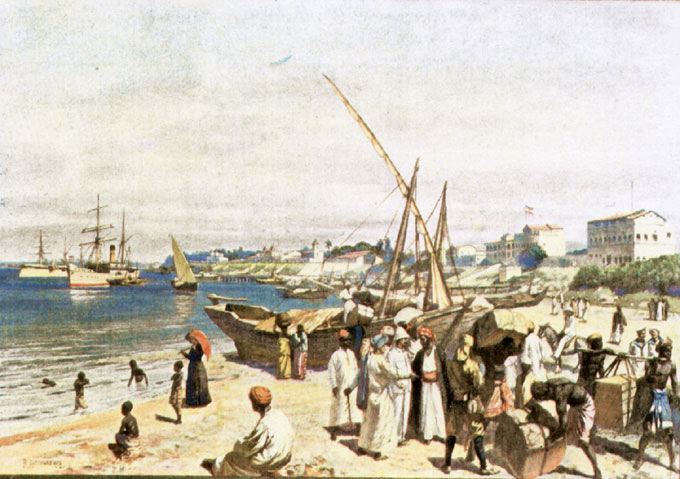
Image of the Port of Dar es Salaam from the book Von Unseren Kolonien by Ottomar Beta in the year 1908

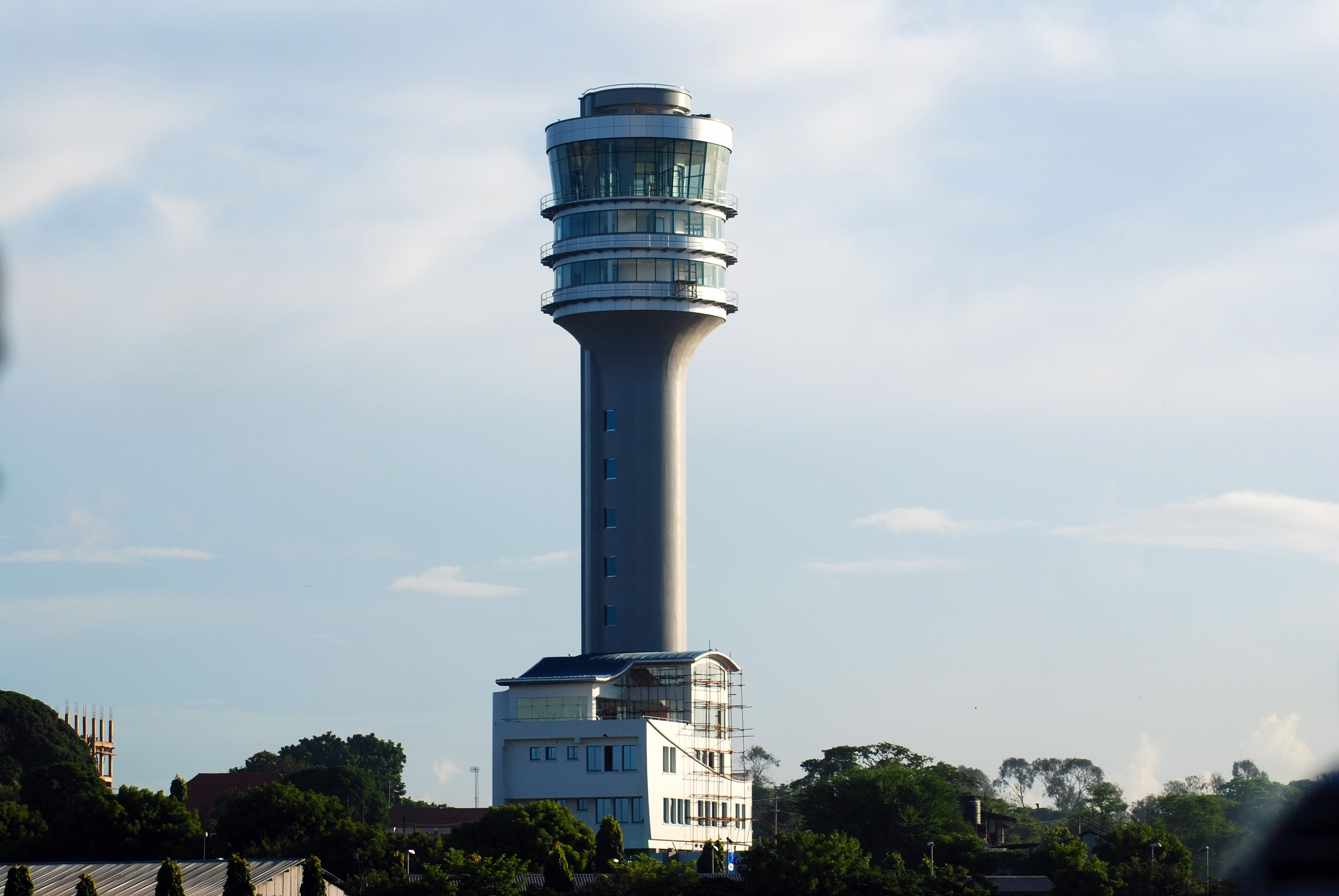
The Port of Dar es Salaam Lighthouse in south east of Kivukoni

The city owes its existence to the port at Dar es Salaam. The city began its development in 1862 by the Sultan of Zanzibar Majid bin Said as an alternative port to the ports of Bagamoyo and Zanzibar; however, after his death the project was scrapped. It was not resumed until the German East Africa Company began to rebuild the city in 1887. The Germans had already completed the Usambara Railway from the Port of Tanga and began constructing the new Tanzanian Central Line from their new capital to the port of Dar es Salaam.

After World War I the British took over Tanganyika and maintained their capital in the city. Economic activity continued through the early 20th century and through World War II, centralised around the city and this facilitated expansion of the port. After Tanganyika gained its independence the city retained its position as the commercial capital.

=== Apartheid South Africa ===
Due to the Apartheid South Africa government many land-locked Southern African countries such as Zambia, Zimbabwe and Malawi that had relied on South African ports turned to the Port of Dar es Salaam. This facilitated the construction of the TAZARA Railway, TANZAM highway and the Malawi corridor link. The port provides a gateway for Zambian copper exports and Malawian tobacco exports, furthermore it provides a vital lifeline for fuel imports.

=== Present operations ===
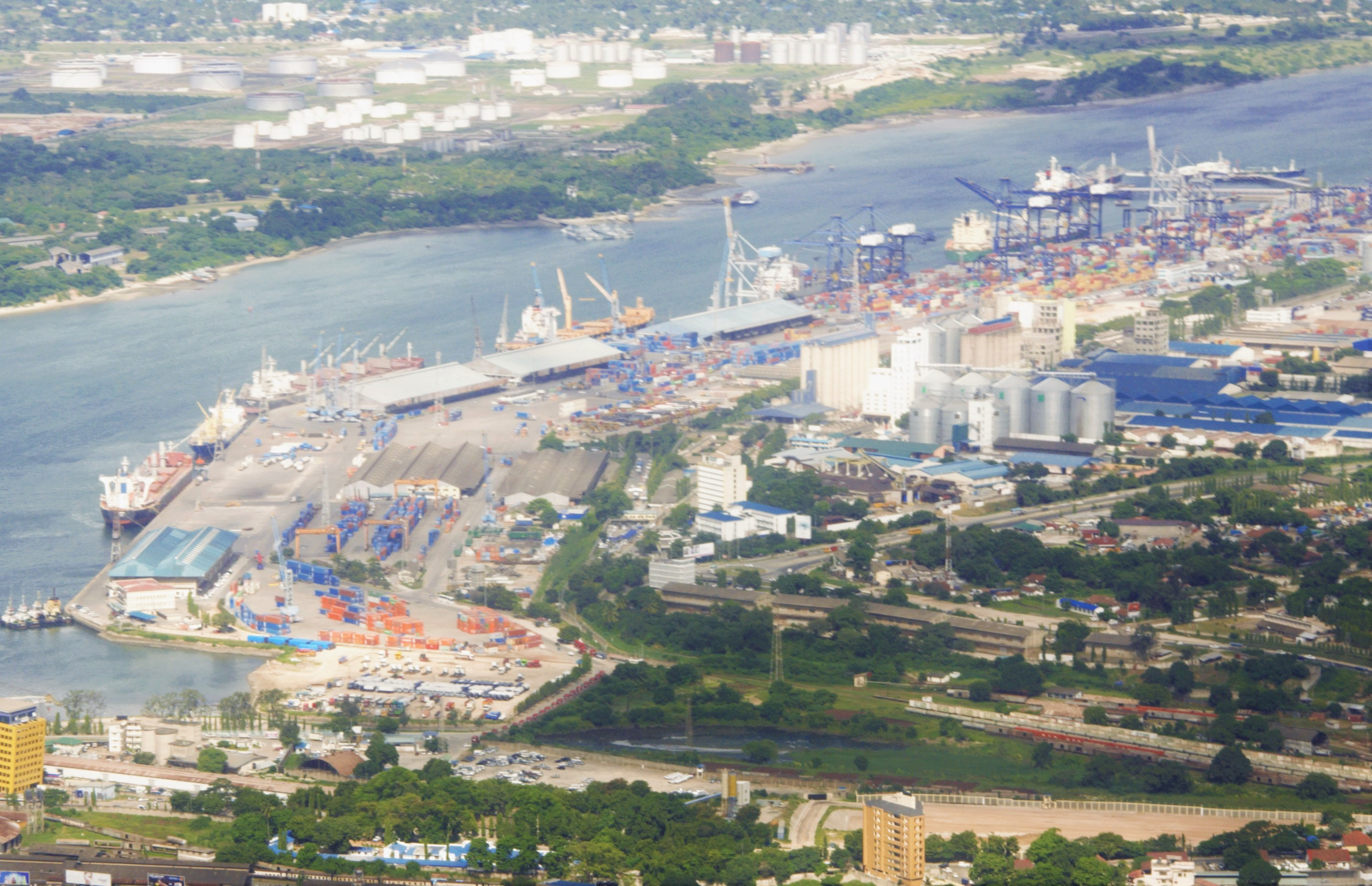
An aerial view of Dar es Salaam Port.

With the continually growing economies in the region the reliance of dar port increased drastically. The port saw an average of 10% annual growth of cargo traffic from 2003 onwards which complemented the rapid growth of the city of Dar es Salaam.

The port has faced increased criticism of inefficiencies and corruption and has seen increased international pressure.

In October 2023 the Tanzania Ports Authority signed a 30-year concession granting the Dubai-based operator DP World the right to operate and modernise the multi-purpose port. DP World, which took over operations in April 2024, committed to invest more than US$250 million over the first five years, and the authorities reported reduced vessel waiting times and higher container throughput following the handover.

== Expansion ==
The port is currently being expanded at the cost of $421m. The number of vehicles will rise by 268 percent upon completion of the port.

In July 2020, a foundation stone was laid for the construction of an inland port in Tanzania at the cost of $20m. The construction will include building a 150m berth, which is all set for completion in 24 months. As of July 2020, 80 percent of the construction has been completed.

== Foreign cargo centers ==
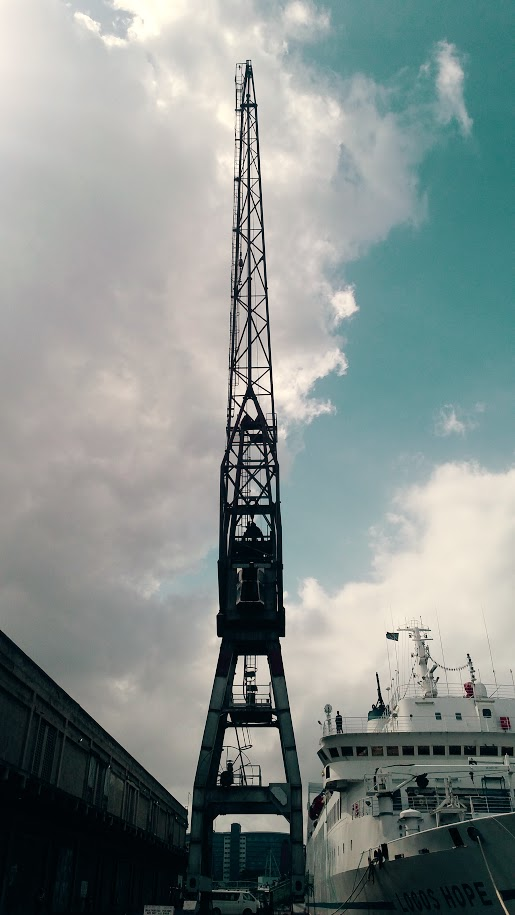
A cargo crane at the Tanzania Ports Authority.

Country wise distribution of cargo (excluding Tanzania) through Dar-es-Salaam port (Imports + Exports 2015/16)
1. Zambia (37.5%)
2. D. R. Congo (30.3%)
3. Rwanda (17.4%)
4. Burundi (7.27%)
5. Uganda (3.23%)
6. Malawi (2.21%)
7. Other (2.11%)

35% of cargo moving through the port is foreign owned and Dar es Salaam port facilitates countries that rely heavily on Dar es salaam port and gives them licenses to operate their own cargo centers. The foreign cargo centers help countries to process cargo from their respective countries to increase efficiency and reduce costs.

=== MOFED Tanzania Limited ===
MOFED Tanzania limited is a Zambian-owned clearing and forwarding company. MOFED stands for the Ministry of Finance and Economic Development which in April 2001 replaced the defunct zamcargo. The company is an entirely Zambian government owned organization and deals with the majority of Zambian Exports and Imports. MOFED operates out of the Mukuba Depot, located in south Kurasini and has direct access to the TAZARA rail link.

=== Malawi Cargo Center Limited ===
The Malawi Cargo Center was set up by the Government of Malawi in the early 1990s due to the closure of Beira and Nacala ports following the Mozambique Civil war. The company has dedicated warehouses and operates dry ports in Dar es Salaam and Mbeya. The MCCL's main revenue earner/cargo is fuel bound for Malawi. Fuel and goods are loaded onto wagons on the TAZARA bound for Mbeya and then trucked into Malawi through the Kyela Border.

== Awards ==
Dar Port has been voted Africa's Leading Cruise Port in the 27th edition of the World Travel Awards in Africa.
