= Mchuchuma =

Coordinates: 09°15′00″S 34°15′00″E

Mchuchuma mine
- Interactive map of Mchuchuma mine
- Location: Ludewa District, Njombe Region, Tanzania
- Products: Coal

Mchuchuma in south western Tanzania near Ludewa off the northern tip of Lake Nyasa, is the site of major coal deposits. There is also a thermal power station costing$612m. Recent studies indicate that Mchuchuma/Ketewaka coal deposits should be connected to the coast by rail to facilitate exports. The railway that will be built will be part of the Mtwara Development Corridor project.

== See also ==
- Transport in Tanzania
- Timeline of African Union of Railways - other railway proposals.
