= Usambara Railway =

Coordinates: 6°S 35°E

Overview
- Locale: German East Africa
- Website: www.mwtc.go.tz

Technical
- Line length: 350.5 km (217.8 mi) + 86.1 km (53.5 mi)
- Track gauge: 1 Meter
- Minimum radius: 150 m
- Maximum incline: 2.5 %

The Usambara Railway (German: Usambarabahn) was the first railway to be built in German East Africa and what is today Tanzania.

== History ==
=== German East-Africa ===
A railway company was created in 1891 with the aim of connecting the port of Tanga at the Indian Ocean with Lake Victoria by passing south of the Usambara Mountains. A 1,000 mm (3 ft 3 3/8 in) gauge was chosen. From June 1893 the line advanced inland from Tanga. Due to undercapitalization, the company had to be taken over by the state in 1899. Thereafter the line was run by the Ostafrikanische Eisenbahngesellschaft (East African Railway Cooperation), a company which had been created to build and operate the Tanganyika Central Line (Zentralbahn) from Dar es Salaam to Kigoma. Between Pongwe and Ngommi on the Usambara Railway there was a double hairpin turn. Around 1910, a cable spur (the Seilbahn) was constructed to connect the line with the sawmills at Neu-Hornow. One of the civil engineers working on the line was Erwin Böhme.

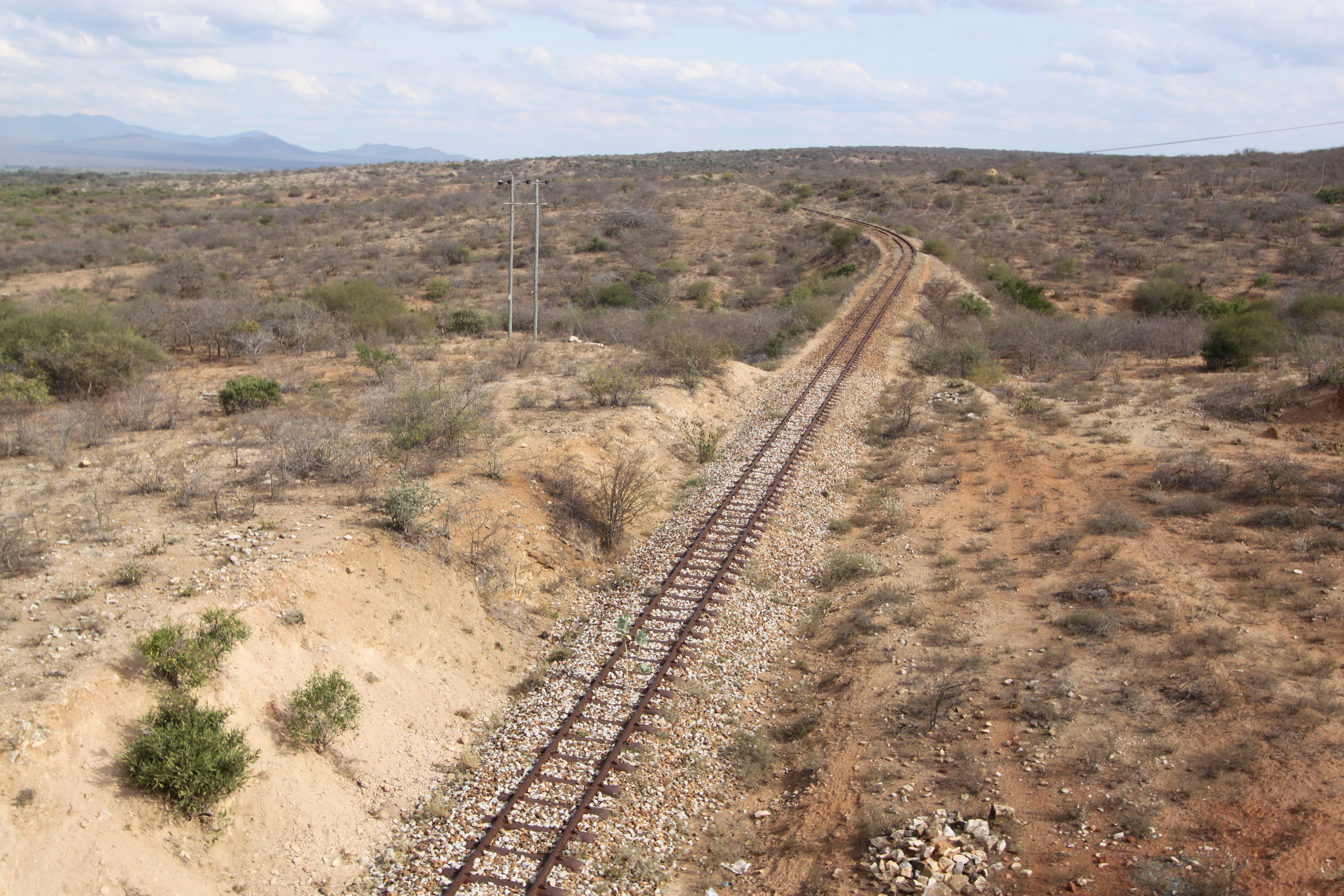
Usambara Railway tracks

On 26 September 1911, the track reached Moshi at Mount Kilimanjaro by 351.4 km (218.3 mi). Traffic on the entire line commenced on 4 October 1911; the official inauguration took place on 7 February 1912. In 1914, a train ran daily from Tanga to Buiko and back, and twice a week, the service continued to and from Moshi. The entire trip took 14 hours and 40 minutes.

From the Tengeni station to the town of Sigi, there was a branch-line of 23.3 km (14.5 mi) constructed with a 750 mm (2 ft 5 1/2 in) gauge, possessing four switchbacks on its course.

From 4 June 1912 to 12 May 1913, the line was renamed Nordbahn (Northern Railway) for a short period. The extension to Arusha was already planned and capital was provided, but was not built due to the start of World War I.

=== British Mandate ===
The British mandate, which took over Tanganyika from the Germans, connected the Usambara Railway between Moshi and Voi with the Uganda Railway in Kenya and extended it 1929 to its current termination point Arusha.

== Tanzania ==
Shortly after the country (it was still then Tanganyika) became independent, the Tanganyika Central Line and the Usambara Railway were connected between Mruazi and Ruvu; the new section was in use in 1964. During the East African Community era, which covered Kenya, Uganda and Tanganyika/Tanzania, the Usambara Railway belonged to East African Railways (EAR). This community was dissolved in 1977, and the Usambara Railway became part of the Tanzania Railways Corporation.

== Service ==
Under German rule in 1913, the Usambara Railway operated 18 locomotives, 31 carriages and 199 trucks with 562 employees (of which 35 were Europeans).

After construction of the connection to Voi, traffic between Arusha, Moshi and the coast was directed to the port of Mombasa, and the eastern part of the Usambara Railway was reduced to a local service. Passenger traffic was handled with four DMUs during this time. Passenger trains operated on this line up to the 1990s.

In 2018, the Government of Tanzania invested 5.7 billion Tanzanian shillings to rehabilitate the line. As of July 2019, diesel powered cargo trains are leaving Tanga Railway Station again. Passenger transport between Tanga and Arusha was planned to start in September 2019, but has not been commenced yet.

== Gallery ==
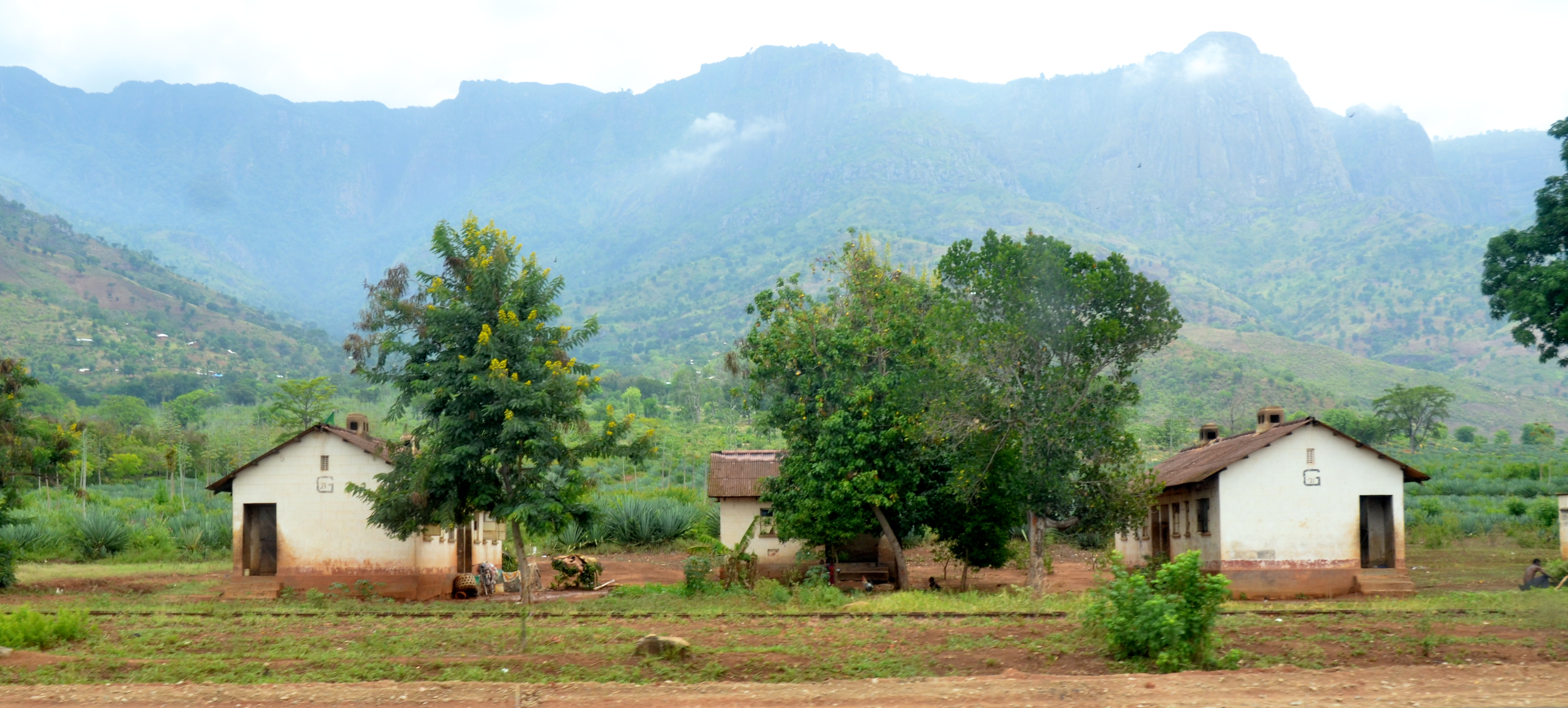
One of the many small (loading) stations lining up along the railtracks.

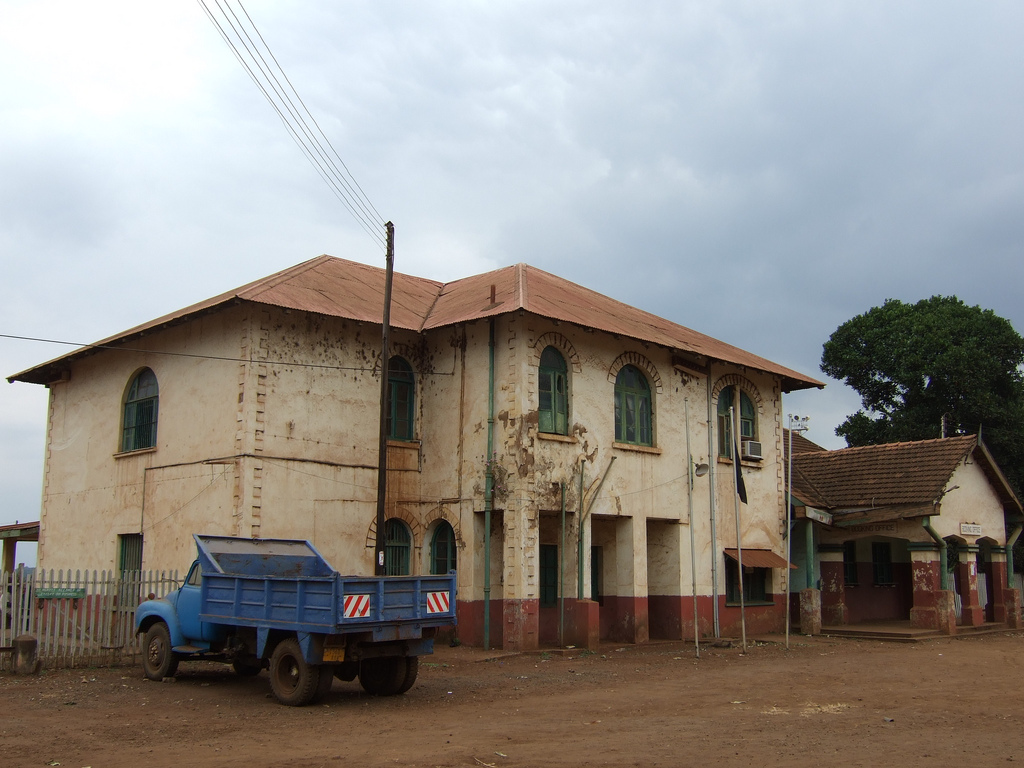
Moshi Railway Station.

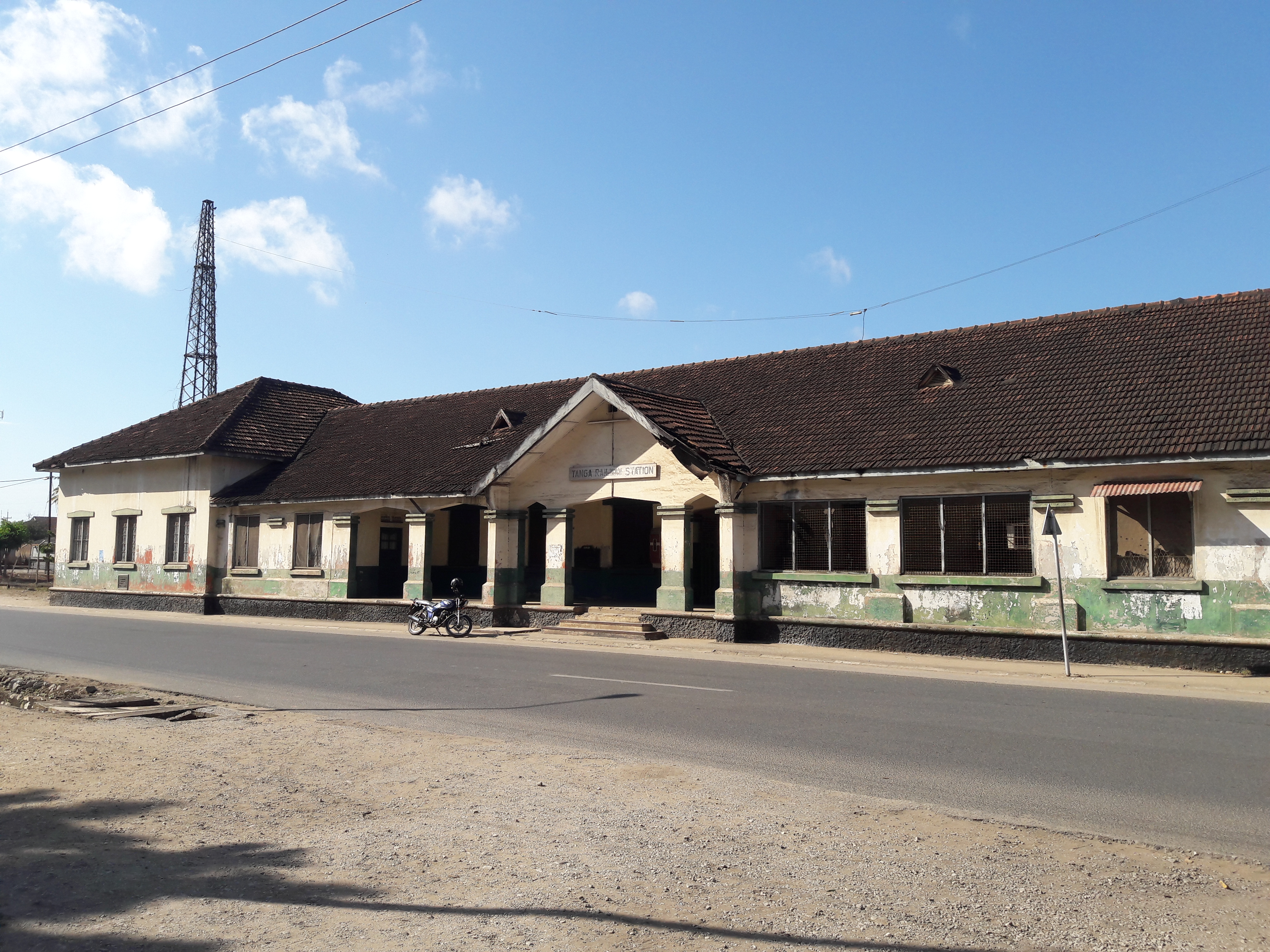
Tanga Railway Station.

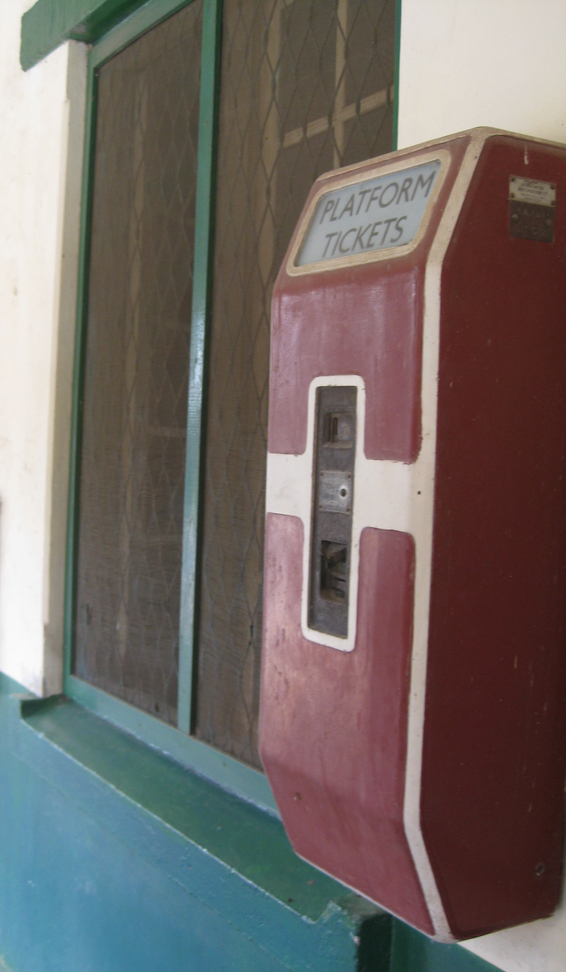
Platform ticket machine in Tanga.

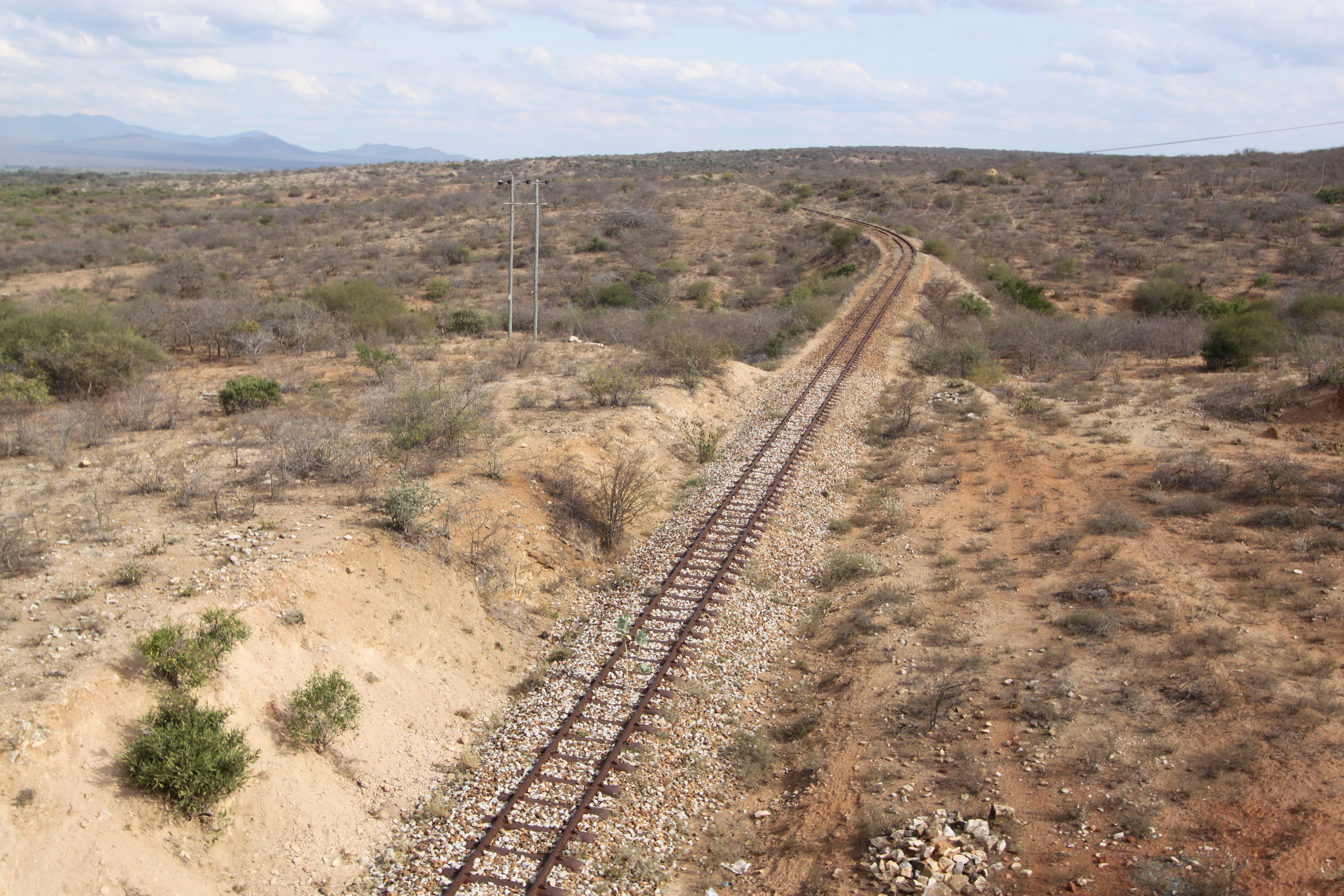
Tracks

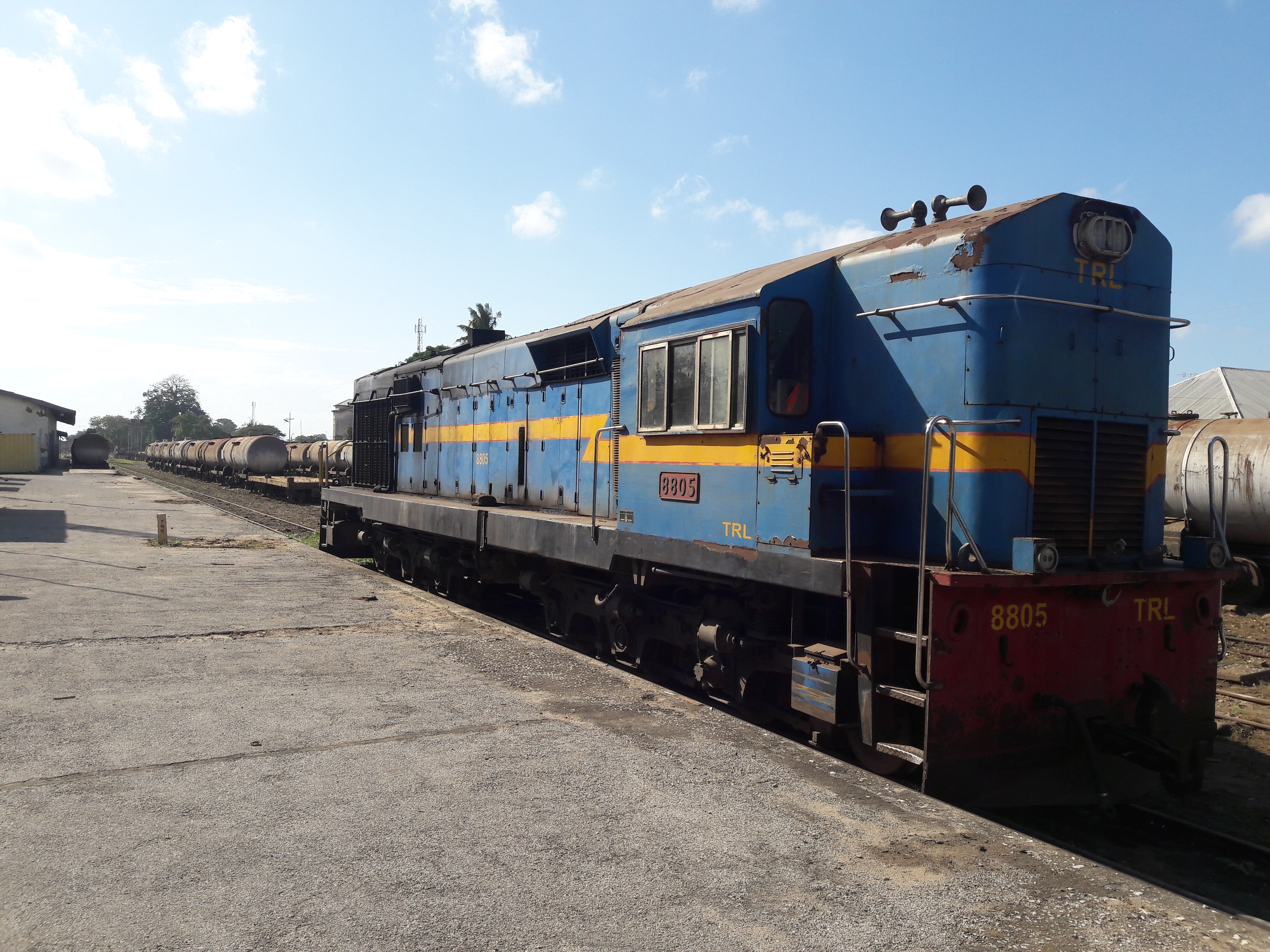
Diesel locomotive at Tanga Railway Station in 2019.

== See also ==
- Rail transport in Tanzania
- Transport in Tanzania

== Bibliography ==
- Helmut Schroeter: Die Eisenbahnen der ehemaligen deutschen Schutzgebiete Afrikas und ihre Fahrzeuge = Die Fahrzeuge der deutschen Eisenbahnen 7. Frankfurt 1961.
