= Kijereshi Game Reserve =

Tanzanian game reserve

- IUCN category VI (protected area with sustainable use of natural resources)
- Interactive map of Kijereshi Game Reserve
- Location: Simiyu Region of Tanzania
- Nearest city: Lukungu, Mwabayanda, Mwakiroba, Kijilishi, Nyamikoma, Senta
- Coordinates: 2°1′4″N 0°33′3″E
- Area: 66 kilometres (41 mi)
- Governing body: Tanzania Wildlife Management Authority

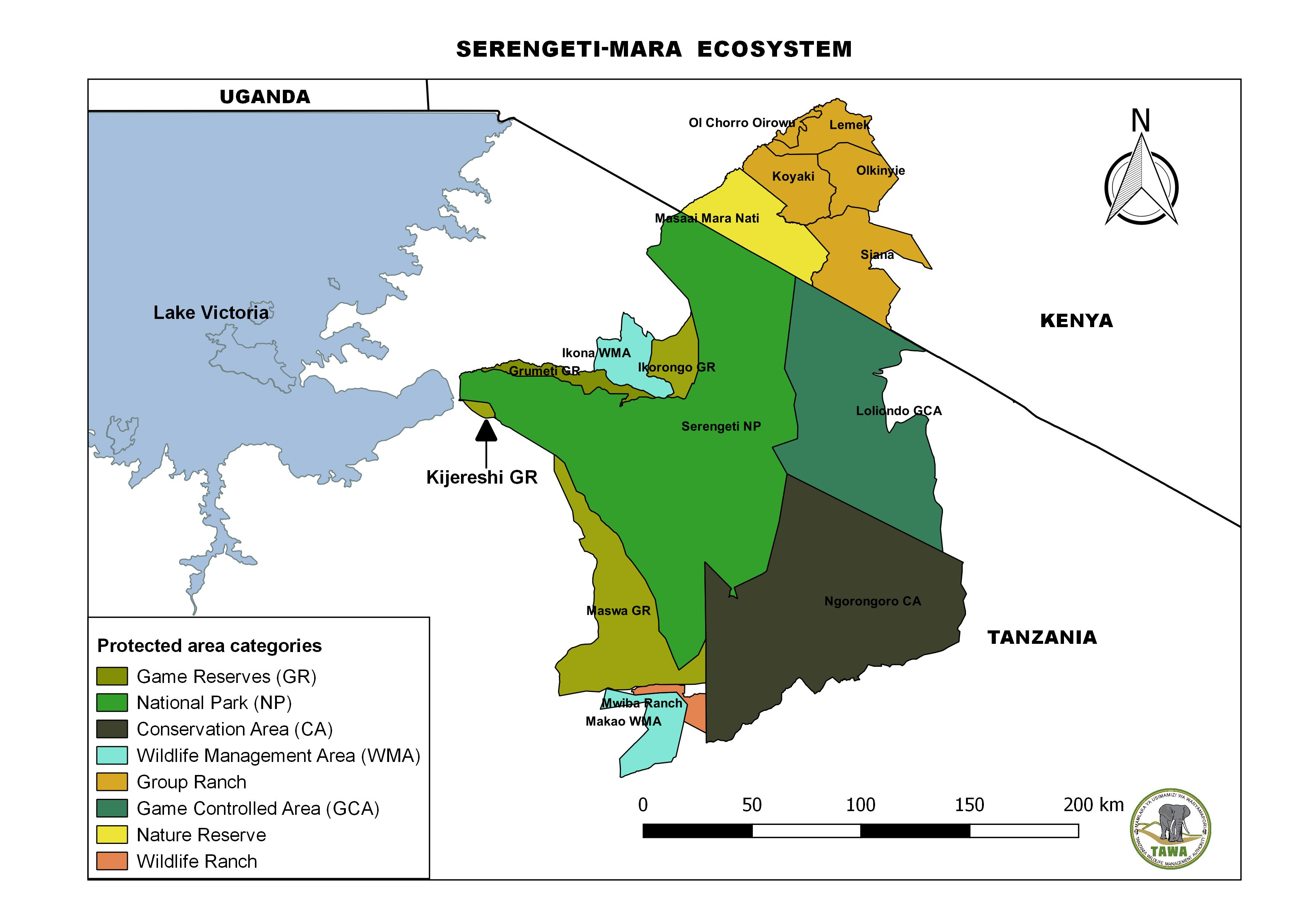
Location of Kijereshi Game Reserve in the Serengeti-Mara Ecosystem

Kijereshi Game Reserve is a protected area located in Simiyu Region of Tanzania.

== Introduction ==
Kijereshi Game Reserve is part of Serengeti-Mara Ecosystem which forms an integral part of the Western Corridor for the Great wildebeest migration. The reserve is at the western end of the wildebeest migration transit route, becoming a part of the "wet season transition phase". The reserve stands as a last turning point of wildebeest migration in the Tanzania side where migrant's with their calves passes between May and July yearly depending on the rains.

The Kijereshi Game Reserve covers nearly 66 square kilometres of lush and open plains. The reserve was gazetted on 10 June 1994 following the Tanzania Government Notice (G.N) No. 215. Protection of the area dates back 1964 when it was Maswa Game Controlled Area and later upgraded to game reserve due to its ecological and social – economical values. Additionally, the reserve is categorised as Protected area with sustainable use of natural resources (Category VI) under IUCN categories of protected areas.

The name of Kijereshi came from the village bordering the reserve known as Kijilishi, a Sukuma tribe word with no specific meaning. From "Kijilishi" to "Kijereshi" it was just a mistake in pronunciation where the name was first used by the Asian investor who named his tented camp as “Kijereshi Tented Camp”. Following the gazettement of the area as a Game Reserve in 1994, the officials from Wildlife Division (WD) of Ministry of Natural Resources and Tourism adopted Kijereshi as the official name of the reserve. Therefore, the reserve was named Kijereshi Game Reserve.

== Location ==
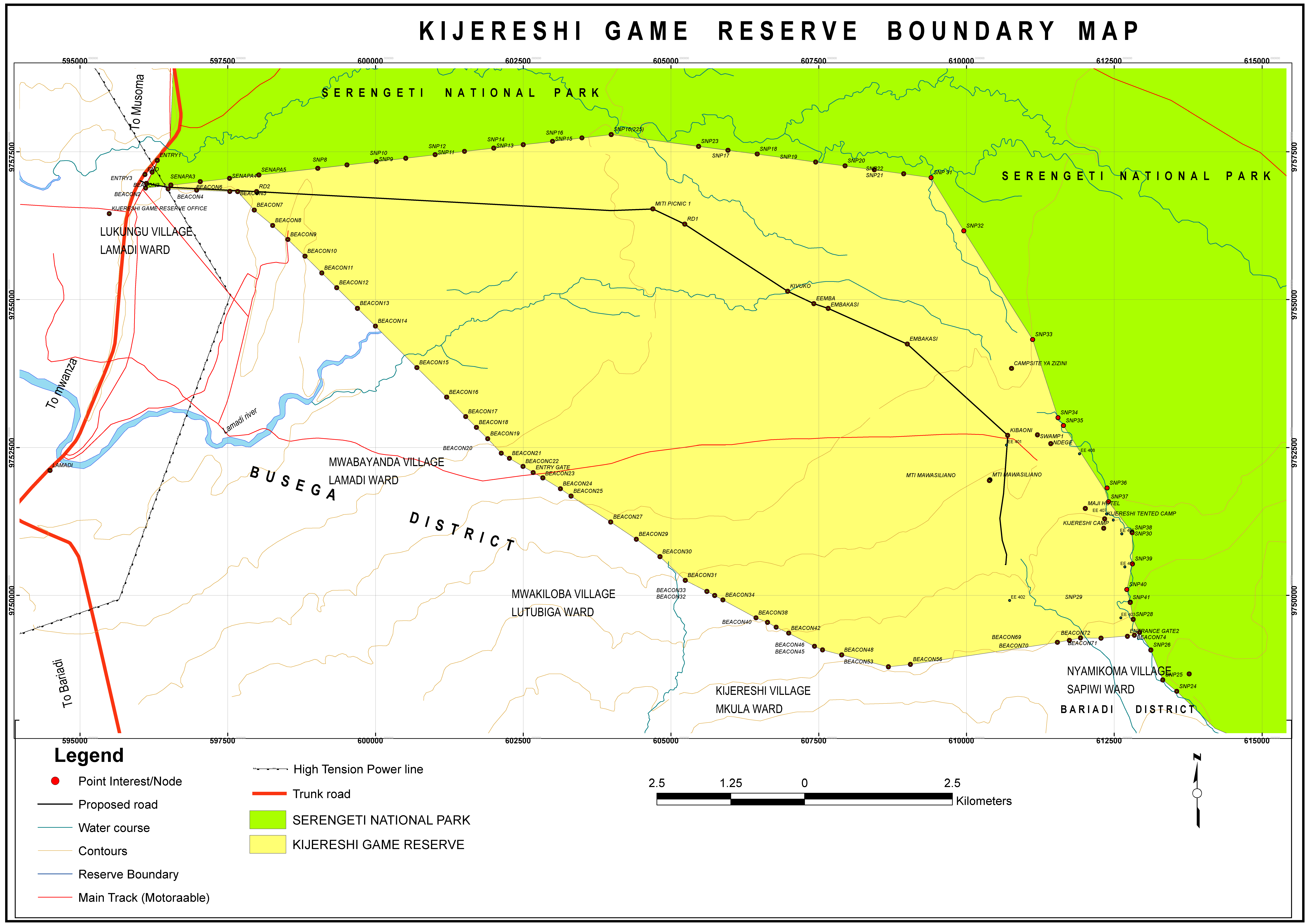
Kijereshi Game Reserve boundary map

Kijereshi Game Reserve is located at south-west of Serengeti National Park lying between Latitude 2^{o}1” and 4^{o}0” South of Equator and Longitude 33^{o}3” and 35^{o}1” East of Greenwich. Furthermore, the reserve falls within Busega (partitioned from previous Magu district) and Bariadi districts of Simiyu region in Tanzania mainland. In the western part Kijereshi Game Reserve is bordering with Lukungu village while Lake Victoria is at 2.5 km from the same side. Mwabayanda, Mwakiroba, Kijilishi, Nyamikoma and Senta villages are all bordering Kijereshi Game Reserve at southern side.

== Management ==
After its gazzetement in 1994 from the former Maswa Game Controlled Area Kijereshi Game Reserve was managed by Wildlife Division of Ministry of Natural Resources and Tourism. Following the establishment of Tanzania Wildlife Management Authority (TAWA) on 9 May 2014 and its amendment via Tanzania Government Notice (G.N) No. 20 of 23 January 2015 as a new authority responsible for managing Game Reserves (GRs), Game Controlled Areas (GCAs) and Open Areas, thus Kijereshi Game Reserve (KGR) is currently under TAWA Management.

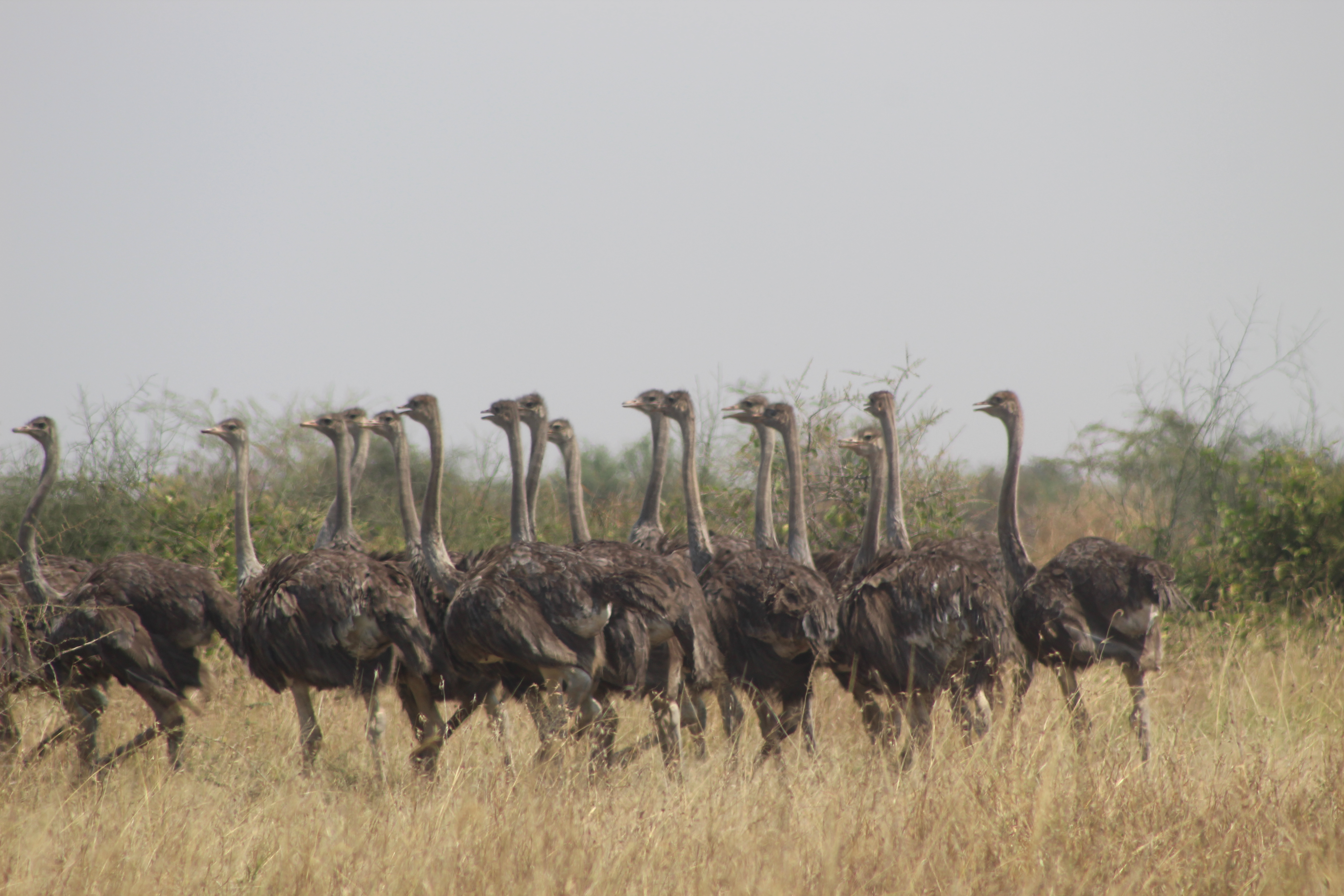
Kijereshi Game Reserve is one of the breeding sites for Ostrich in Western Serengeti. This photo was taken on 26 July 2019 in Kijershi Game Reserve which show young Ostriches bred few months ago.

== Wildlife ==
Kijereshi Game Reserve is rich in wildlife including mammals, birds, reptiles, amphibians and invertebrates. Mammals found in the reserve include wildebeest, zebra, buffalo, topi, elephant, waterbuck, Thomson's gazelle, bushbuck, impala, black backed jackal, spotted hyena just to mention few. Common birds include ostrich, ground hornbill, lovebirds, water birds and many more. Agama lizards and monitor lizards are some of the reptiles found in Kijereshi Game Reserve. Amphibians and invertebrates are plenty.

== Vegetation, Climate and Soil ==
=== Vegetation ===
The reserve is dominated by open grassland vegetation, however the Geographic Information System Unit from TAWA has categorised the reserve into three categories of vegetation namely riverine forest, open grassland and wooded grassland.

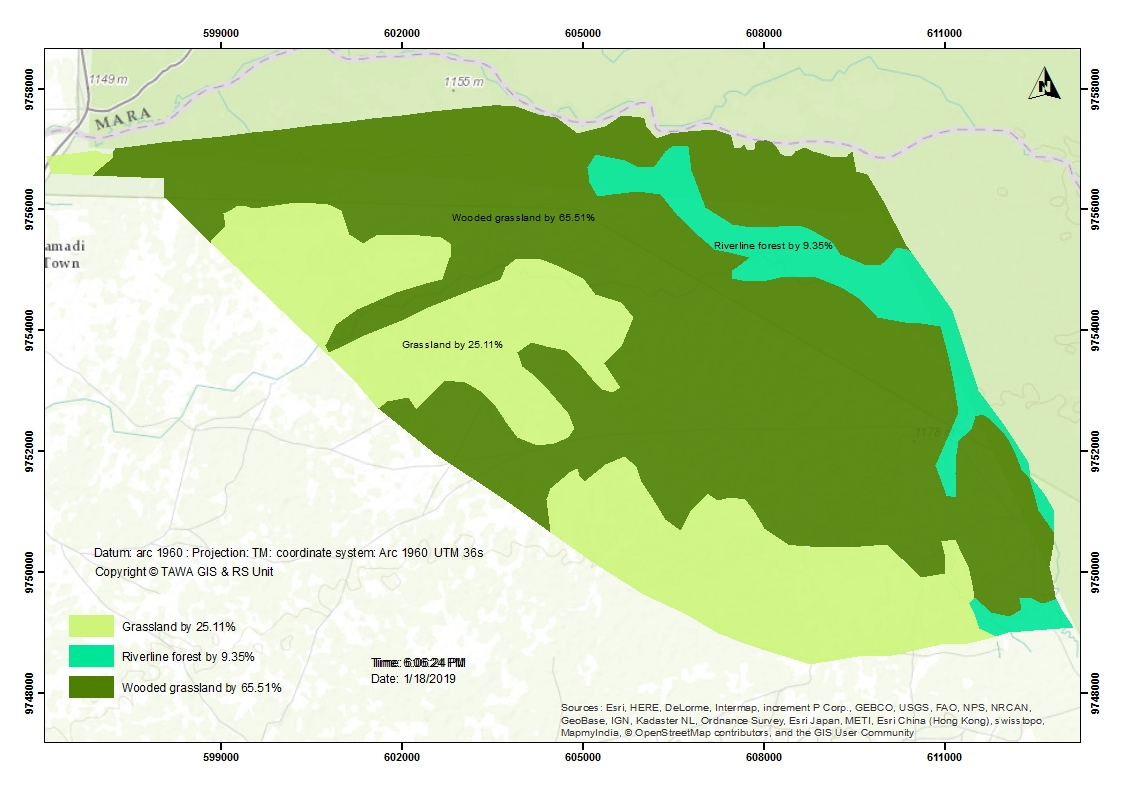
Kijereshi Game Reserve vegetation map.

=== Climate Condition ===
Kijereshi Game Reserve experiences moderate temperatures ranging from an average of 18 °C to 31 °C annually. The rainfall season normally starts in October and ends in May. The annual rainfall ranges from 750 mm to 850 mm and is concentrated in two peaks periods. In the first one, from October to December, rains are shorter; the second is from February to mid-May and has longer and heavier rains.

=== Soil ===
The soil of Kijereshi Game Reserve is mainly black cotton soil composed of black clay, a common type of soil found in the western corridor of Serengeti Ecosystem. However, there are areas dominated by sandy loam soil.

== Activities ==
Game drive is the main tourist activity in Kijereshi Game Reserve however biking can also be arranged. Other activities include guided nature walk, camping, night game drive, bird watching and commercial photography/filming.

== Accessibility ==
The reserve can be accessed throughout the year. However, June to September is the best time for mammals following migration and October to February is ideal time for bird watching.

=== By Road ===
- Through Mwanza – Musoma highway, the reserve can be accessed from, Lamadi (3 km), Bunda (20 km), Musoma (86 km), Tarime (137 km) and 135 Mwanza city centre (135 km).
- From Arusha, Kijereshi Game Reserve can be accessed via Serengeti road (471 km) and Arusha – Shinyanga – Simiyu road (840 km).
- Also the reserve can be accessed from Bariadi (70 km) via Simiyu (Bariadi) – Mwanza road
- From border points the reserve can be accessed from Sirari (154 km) border to Kenya via Sirari – Mwanza road, Rusumo (618 km) border to Rwanda via Rusumo -Shinyanga-Simiyu road and Ngara (620 km) border to Burundi via Ngara-Shinyanga-Simiyu road.

=== By Air ===
- Kijereshi Game Reserve can be accessed from Mwanza Airport (135 km through Mwanza – Musoma highway).
- From Musoma Airport the reserve is accessible through Mwanza – Musoma highway about 86 km.

=== By Water ===
- Kijereshi Game Reserve can be accessed by water through Lake Victoria which is about 2.5 km from the western part of the reserve.
