= Kadoto =

- Ward
- Location in Tanzania
- Coordinates: 02°57′S 33°40′E
- Country: Tanzania
- Region: Simiyu
- District: Maswa

Government
  - Type: Ward

Area
  - Total: 41.7 sq mi (108.0 km^{2})

Population (2012)
  - Total: 11,916
  - Density: 286/sq mi (110.3/km^{2})
- Time zone: GMT + 3

Kadoto is a Ward (kata in Swahili) within the Maswa District in Simiyu Region, Tanzania. It is located northwest of Buchambi, north of Isanga, east/northeast of Kulimi, east/southeast of Shishiyu and southwest of Kinang`weli, Itilima District. The Simiyu River is the border between Kadoto and Kinang`weli and the border between Maswa District and Itilima District.

According to the 2012 census, the Ward had a population of 11,916 residents (5,771 males and 6,145 females). The average household size was 6.9 people. In 2002 11,587 people (5,516 males and 6,071 females) lived in this ward. There were 1,788 households and the average household size was 6.5 people.

The Postal code is 39325.

== Transport ==
Two important regional highways are located in this ward. The R362 runs through the ward from west to east, connecting Malya Airport with the T36 and the regional capital Bariadi. The R369 starts in the center of Kadoto, connecting it with the district capital Maswa south/southeast of Kadoto. An important bridge over the Simiyu River is part of the R362, located at the border between Kadoto and the Kingang`weli ward.

== Administrative subdivisions ==
The Ward is divided into 4 Villages (kijiji in Swahili) and 15 Hamlets (vitongoji in Swahili):

Village	Hamlet	Inhabitants (2012)
Kadoto		3,322
	Mwalukiliko	
	Bugumwa	
	Bugesela	
	Igwata	
Malekano		2,199
	Madukani	
	Mwalundi	
	Mwang`alanga	
	Dashina	
Mwang`anda		3,218
	Kadoto	
	Bukini	
	Mwamini	
	Dani	
Dulung`wa		3,176
	Kashishi	
	Mwamilo	
	Nyanguku	
