= T4 road (Tanzania) =

Road in Tanzania

Trunk Road T4
- The T4 is indicated in red.

Route information
- Maintained by TANROADS
- Length: 765 km (475 mi)

Major junctions
- West end: A1 at the Kenyan border at Tarime
- T17 in Makutano; T36 in Lamadi; T8 in Kisesa; T8 in Usagara; T9 in Biharamulo; T38 in Kyaka
- East end: Ugandan border at Mutukula

Location
- Country: Tanzania
- Regions: Mara, Simiyu, Mwanza, Geita, Kagera
- Major cities: Tarime, Mwanza, Sengerema, Geita, Bukoba, Mutukula

Highway system
- Transport in Tanzania
| ← T3 | → T5 |

The T4 is a Trunk road in Tanzania. The road runs along Lake Victoria in the regions of the Lake Zone in Tanzania. The T4 runs from Tarime at the Kenyan border all the way through Mwanza and Bukoba to the Ugandan border. The T4 is the only highway in the country that both starts and ends at an International border. The roads as it is approximately 765 km (475 mi). The road is entirely paved.

== Route ==
=== Mwanza ===
Between Kigongo and Busisi, the trunk road traverses over the Mwanza gulf. As part of the trunk road there are several scheduled ferries between the two cities. There are about 1,600 vehicles crossing the channel by ferry per day, spending 35 minutes per crossing. Currently under construction is the Kigongo–Busisi Bridge (Magufuli Bridge), once complete will connect both sides by road and expand the weight limit of this part of the route.

== See also ==
- Transport in Tanzania
- List of roads in Tanzania
