= T8 road (Tanzania) =

Road in Tanzania

Trunk Road T8
- The T8 is indicated in yellow.

Route information
- Maintained by TANROADS
- Length: 881 km (547 mi)

Major junctions
- South end: T1 in Mbeya
- T22 in Rungwa; T23 in Ipole; T18 in Tabora; T3 in Nzega; T3 in Tinde; T37 in Shinyanga; T36 in Mwigumbi; T4 in Usagara
- North end: T4 in Kisesa

Location
- Country: Tanzania
- Regions: Mbeya, Singida, Tabora, Shinyanga, Mwanza
- Major cities: Mbeya, Tabora, Nzega, Shinyanga , Mwanza

Highway system
- Transport in Tanzania
← T7	→ T9

The T8 is a Trunk road in Tanzania. The road runs from Mbeya through Tabora, ending just outside the city of Mwanza in Kisesa. The roads as it is approximately 881 km (547 mi). The road is partially paved, with the biggest unpaved section being from Chunya to Tabora.

== Route ==
=== Tabora ===
Between the 42 km (26 mi) streach from Nzega to Tinde, the T3 trunk road shares its designation with T8 trunk road.

== See also ==
- Transport in Tanzania
- List of roads in Tanzania
