= Magu =

Magu may refer to:

- Magu, Iran, a village in Kerman Province, Iran
- Magu, Rafsanjan, a village in Kerman Province, Iran
- Magu District of Mwanza Region, Tanzania
- Magu, Tanzania a town in Mwanza Region of Tanzania
- Gilbert "Magu" Luján
- Magu, a Desorden Público band member
- Magu (deity), a legendary Chinese immortal

== See also ==
- Magoo (disambiguation)
