= T3 road (Tanzania) =

Road in Tanzania

Trunk Road T3
- The T3 is indicated in yellow.

Route information
- Maintained by TANROADS

Major junctions
- East end: T1 in Morogoro
- T5 in Dodoma; T18 in Manyoni; T22 in Mkiwa; T14 in Singida; T14 in Singida; T8 in Nzega; T9 in Nyakanazi; T11 & T38 in Kasulo
- West end: NR4 at the Rwandan border at Rusumo

Location
- Country: Tanzania
- Regions: Morogoro, Dodoma, Singida, Tabora, Shinyanga, Geita, Kagera
- Major cities: Morogoro, Dodoma, Manyoni, Singida, Nzega, Kahama

Highway system
- Transport in Tanzania
← T2	→ T4

The T3 is a Trunk road in Tanzania. The road runs from the center of Morogoro where the Trunk Road T1 and T3 intersect all the way to Rwandan border at Rusumo. The road is the longest trunk road in the Tanzanian road system and it is approximately 1,097 km (682 mi). The road is a major road connecting the coast to the Tanzanian Capital Dodoma along with Rwanda. The road is entirely paved. The trunk road forms the only major land link to East African Community member Rwanda.

== Route ==
=== Morogoro ===
Between 1959 and 2022, the Wami bridge was a single lane bridge between the towns of Wami and Dakawa. In 2022 the New Wami Bridge was opened after the Tanzanian government spent TZS 75 Billion to upgrade the bridge and increase safety.

=== Tabora ===
Between the 42 km (26 mi) streach from Nzega to Tinde, the T3 trunk road shares its designation with T8 trunk road.

=== Kagera ===
Between the 15 km (9.3 mi) streach from Nyakanazi to Lusahunga, the T3 trunk road shares its designation with the T9 trunk road.

== See also ==
- Transport in Tanzania
- List of roads in Tanzania
