= Isebania =

Isebania or Isibania may refer to any of the following:

- Isebania, Kenya, a town in Migori County, Kenya
- Isebania, Tanzania, a town in Tarime District, Tanzania
