= KGR =

KGR or kgr could refer to:

- Abun language, Papuan language spoken in Indonesia
- Greifswald Nuclear Power Plant, in East Germany
- Kampfgruppe, German-language term for a combat formation
- K. G. Ramachandran, fictional prime minister in the 1988 Indian film August 1
- Kijereshi Game Reserve, protected area in Simiyu Region, Tanzania
- KKGR, radio station in Helena, Montana, U.S.
- Kulgera Airport, an airport in Kulgera, Northern Territory, Australia
