= Busega District =

- District
- location within Simiyu Region.
- Coordinates: 02°23′S 033°34′E
- Country: Tanzania
- Region: Simiyu Region

Area
  - Total: 1,424 km^{2} (550 sq mi)

Population (2022)
  - Total: 282,167
  - Density: 198.2/km^{2} (513.2/sq mi)

Busega District is one of the five districts of Simiyu Region of Tanzania, East Africa. Its administrative centre is the town of Nyashimo. It is bordered to the north by Lake Victoria and Bunda District, to the east by Bariadi District, and to the south by Magu District.

As of 2022, the population of Busega was 282,167. Busega was established in 2012, when it was split off from Magu District and became part of the newly established Simiyu Region.

== Transport ==
Busega district is connected by two well-maintained and paved national trunk roads. The Mwanza-Musoma highway (trunk road T4) runs through the district from south to north. The highway that connects Shinyanga Region and Mara Region (trunk road T36) branches of the Musoma-Mwanza road in the town of Lamadi in Busega District and passes through the regional capital Bariadi.

== Tourism ==
Because of its proximity to the western 'Ndabaka' gate of Serengeti National Park there are several lodges in the northern part of Busega District, that provide accommodation to tourists who visit the park.

== Administrative subdivisions ==
=== Wards ===
As of 2012, Busega District was administratively divided into 13 wards.

==== 2012 wards ====
The 15 wards in 2012:

- Badugu
- Igalukilo
- Kabita
- Kalemela
- Kiloleli
- Lamadi
- Lutubiga
- Malili
- Mkula
- Mwamanyili
- Ngasamo
- Nyaluhande
- Shigala
- Nyashimo Ward
- Imalamate
