= Budekwa =

Ward in Maswa, Simiyu, Tanzania

Budekwa Kata ya Budekwa
- Ward
- Location within Tanzania
- Coordinates: 3°27′S 33°49′E
- Country: Tanzania
- Region: Simiyu Region
- District: Maswa District
- Ward: Budekwa
- Established: 1984

Government
  - Type: Council

Area
  - Total: 213 km^{2} (82 sq mi)
- Elevation: 1,201 m (3,940 ft)

Population (2016)
  - Total: 8,245
  - Density: 38.7/km^{2} (100/sq mi)
- Time zone: UTC+3 (EAT)
- Postcode: 39309
- Area code: 028
- Website: District Website

Budekwa is a ward in Maswa District, Simiyu Region, Tanzania. The ward covers an area of 213 km^{2} (82 sq mi), with an average elevation of 1,201 m (3,940 ft).

In 2016 the Tanzania National Bureau of Statistics reported that there were 8,245 people in the ward, down from 13,630 in 2012. The ward has 39 inhabitants per square kilometre (100/sq mi).
