= Mugu =

Mugu may refer to:

- Mugu District, one of the seventy-seven districts of Nepal
- Point Mugu, California
  - Point Mugu State Park
  - Naval Air Station Point Mugu
- A nickname for Spanish-Venezuelan professional tennis player Garbiñe Muguruza

== See also ==
- Magu (disambiguation)
