= Busilili =

Ward in Maswa, Simiyu, Tanzania

Coordinates: 3.32406°S 33.777072°E

Busilili is a ward from Maswa District in Simiyu Region, Tanzania. In 2016 the Tanzania National Bureau of Statistics report there were 8,584 people in the ward, from 15,797 in 2012. The postal code is 39310.
