= Magu District =

- District
- Magu District of Mwanza Region
- Coordinates: 02°35′S 033°26′E
- Country: Tanzania
- Region: Mwanza Region

Area
  - Total: 1,517 km^{2} (586 sq mi)

Population (2022)
  - Total: 421,119
  - Density: 277.6/km^{2} (719.0/sq mi)
- UFI: -2567436

Magu District is one of the eight districts of the Mwanza Region of Tanzania, East Africa. Its administrative centre is the town of Magu on the Simiyu River. It is bordered to the north by Lake Victoria and Busega District, to the east by Bariadi District, to the south by Itilima District, Maswa District, Kwimba District and Misungwi District, and to the west by the city of Mwanza, which consists of Nyamagana District and Ilemela District.

As of 2022, the population of Magu was 421,119. This is not much more than the district's population in 2002, when the number was 416,113, due to the fact that the district was split up in 2012 and about half of the original Magu district is now part of the new Busega District, Simiyu Region.

== Administrative subdivisions ==
=== Constituencies ===
For parliamentary elections, Tanzania is divided into constituencies. As of the 2010 elections Magu District had two constituencies:

- Busega Constituency
- Magu Constituency

=== Divisions ===
As of 2012, Magu District was administratively divided into four divisions:

- Itumbili
- Kahangara
- Ndagalu
- Sanjo

=== Wards ===
As of 2002, Magu District was administratively divided into twenty-seven wards. As of 2012, it was divided into 25 wards having undergone considerable reorganisation.

==== 2025 wards ====
- Bujashi
- Bukandwe
- Jinjimili
- Kahangara
- Kisesa
- Kitongo Sima
- Kongolo
- Lubugu
- Lutale
- Magu Mjini (Magu town)
- Mwamabanza
- Mwamanga
- Ng'haya
- Nkungulu
- Nyanguge
- Nyigogo
- Shishani
- Sukuma
- Itumbili
- Kabila
- Kandawe
- Buhumbi
- Chabula
- Isandula
- Bujora

== Notes ==
Wards of Magu District - Mwanza Region - Tanzania
Bujashi | Bukwe | Jinjimili | Kahangara | Kisesa | Kitongo Sima | Kongolo | Lubugu | Lutale | Magu Mjini | Mwamabanza | Mwamanga | Ng'haya | Nkungulu | Nyanguge | Nyigogo | Shishani | Sukuma
