= Nyalikungu =

Locality in Simiyu Region, Tanzania

Nyalikungu is a locality in Maswa District, Simiyu Region, Tanzania. It is inhabited by the Sukuma people.It serves as the administrative center for the district and is predominantly inhabited by the Sukuma people.

Geographical Location: Nyalikungu is located at approximately 3.1833°S latitude and 33.7833°E longitude, with an elevation of about 1,354 meters (4,442 feet) above sea level.

Population: According to the 2022 census, Nyalikungu has a population of 9,534 residents.

Nearby Localities: The town is near other localities such as Shanwa, Buchambi, and Iborogero, and is approximately 6 km east of the town of Maswa, which is the administrative seat of the district.
