= T22 road (Tanzania) =

Road in Tanzania

Trunk Road T22
- The T22 is indicated with yellow dashes.

Route information
- Maintained by TANROADS
- Length: 219 km (136 mi)

Major junctions
- North end: T3 in Mkiwa
- T18 in Itigi
- South end: T8 in Rungwa

Location
- Country: Tanzania
- Regions: Singida, Tabora
- Major cities: Itigi

Highway system
- Transport in Tanzania
← T21	→ T23

The T22 is a Trunk road in Tanzania. The road runs south from Mkiwa at the T3 Trunk Road junction south towards Itigi ending at the towards the T8 Trunk Road junction at Rungwa. The roads as it is approximately 219 km (136 mi). The road is not paved.

== See also ==
- Transport in Tanzania
- List of roads in Tanzania
