= Maswa =

- Town
- Location in Tanzania
- Coordinates: 03°11′S 33°47′E
- Country: Tanzania
- Region: Simiyu
- District: Maswa

Government
  - Type: City Council

Population (2022 census)
  - Total: 28,000
- Time zone: GMT + 3

Maswa is a town in Simiyu Region of Tanzania. It is the administrative seat of Maswa District. The original inhabitants are Sukama (Nyantuzu).

According to the 2012 census, the population of Maswa town - consisting of Binza and Nyalikungu wards - was 26,597.

== Transport ==
Trunk road T36 from Shinyanga to Lamadi passes through the town.
