= Isebania, Tanzania =

Isebania, Tanzania Isibania
- Location in Tanzania
- Coordinates: 01°14′44″S 34°28′32″E
- Country: Tanzania
- Region: Mara Region
- District: Tarime District
- Elevation: 1,522 m (4,993 ft)
- Time zone: UTC+3 (East Africa Time)

Isebania, also Isibania, is a town in Tarime District, Mara Region, in northern Tanzania, at the border with Kenya.

== Location ==
The town sits at the border, directly south of the town of Isebania, Kenya. It lies approximately 20 kilometres (12 mi) north of Tarime, the location of the district headquarters. This lies approximately 92 kilometres (57 mi) northeast of Musoma, on the eastern shores of Lake Victoria, the nearest large town. The coordinates of the town are: 1°14'44.0"S, 34°28'32.0"E (Latitude:-1.245569; Longitude:34.475555).

== Overview ==
The elevation of the nearby town of Sirari, Tanzania is 1,522 metres (4,993 ft) above sea level.

== See also ==
- Isebania, Kenya
- Mara Region
