= Buchambi =

Ward in Maswa, Simiyu, Tanzania

Buchambi Kata ya Buchambi
- Ward
- Location within Tanzania
- Coordinates: 3.08024°S 33.724853°E
- Country: Tanzania
- Region: Simiyu Region
- District: Maswa District
- Ward: Buchambi
- Established: 1984

Government
  - Type: Council

Area
  - Total: 132.9 km^{2} (51.3 sq mi)
- Elevation: 1,312 m (4,304 ft)

Population (2016)
  - Total: 14,553
  - Density: 109.5/km^{2} (283.6/sq mi)
- Time zone: UTC+3 (EAT)
- Postcode: 39301
- Area code: 028
- Website: Regional Website

Buchambi is a Ward from Maswa District in Simiyu Region, Tanzania. The ward covers an area of 132.9 km^{2} (51.3 sq mi) with an average elevation of 1,312 m (4,304 ft).

In 2016 the Tanzania National Bureau of Statistics report there were 14,553 people in the ward, from 13,520 in 2012. The ward has 110 inhabitants per square kilometre (280/sq mi).
