= Dakama =

Ward in Maswa District, Simiyu Region, Tanzania

Dakama Kata ya Dakama
- Ward
- Location within Tanzania
- Coordinates: 3.500146°S 34.03264°E
- Country: Tanzania
- Region: Simiyu Region
- District: Maswa District
- Ward: Dakama

Population (2016)
  - Total: 5,482
- Time zone: UTC+3 (EAT)

Dakama is a Ward from Maswa District in Simiyu Region, Tanzania. In 2016 the Tanzania National Bureau of Statistics report there were 5,482 people in the ward, from 14,596 in 2012. Postal code is 39308.
