= Nyashimo =

- Town
- Location in Tanzania
- Coordinates: 02°22′35″S 33°35′02″E
- Country: Tanzania
- Region: Simiyu
- District: Busega
- Time zone: GMT + 3

Nyashimo is a town in Tanzania on the shores of Lake Victoria. It is the district capital of Busega District, Simiyu Region.

== Transport ==
Paved Trunk road T4 from Mwanza to the Kenya border passes through the town.
