= Mwanhuzi =

Capital and ward of Meatu District, Simiyu Region

- Town and Ward
- Location in Tanzania
- Coordinates: 03°32′S 34°19′E
- Country: Tanzania
- Region: Simiyu
- District: Meatu

Population (2012)
  - Total: 20,175
- Time zone: GMT + 3

Mwanhuzi is a small town in Simiyu Region, Tanzania, and the headquarter of Meatu District.

== Transport ==
People in Mwanhuzi are moving from one area to another mainly through land transport which includes bicycles, buses, cars and motorcycles

Unpaved trunk road T37 from Shinyanga to Singida Region passes through the town.

== Population ==
According to the 2012 national census the population of Mwanhuzi ward was 20,175.
