= Kiore (disambiguation) =

The kiore, or Polynesian rat, is a species of rodent.

Kiore or Te Kiore may also refer to:

== People ==
- Te Kiore Paremata Te Wahapiro (fl.1822–1845), New Zealand tribal leader

== Places ==
- Kiore, Tarime, a ward in Mara, Tanzania
- Te Kiore, Ngāti Whakaminenga marae and meeting house in Kaikohe, New Zealand
