= T19 road (Tanzania) =

Road in Tanzania

Trunk Road T19
- The T19 is indicated in yellow.

Route information
- Maintained by TANROADS
- Length: 131 km (81 mi)

Major junctions
- South end: T9 in Kasulu
- T18 in Kidahwe
- North end: RN3 at the Burundian border in Manyovu

Location
- Country: Tanzania
- Regions: Kigoma
- Major cities: Kigoma

Highway system
- Transport in Tanzania
← T18	→ T20

The T19 is a Trunk road in Tanzania. The road runs from Kasulu and heads west towards Kigoma and then North to the Burundian border. The roads as it is approximately 131 km (81 mi). The road is entirely paved.

== See also ==
- Transport in Tanzania
- List of roads in Tanzania
