= Kigongo–Busisi Bridge =

Bridge in Tanzania

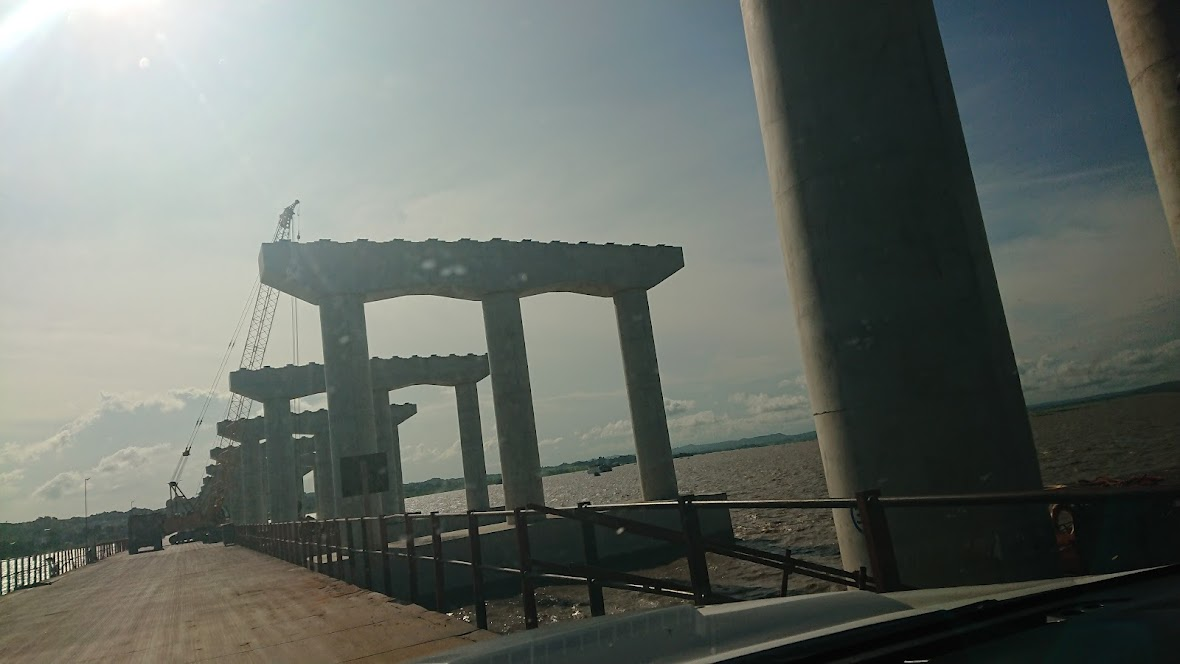
- Construction Completed

- Coordinates: 02°43′29″S 32°52′21″E Kigongo–Busisi Bridge (Tanzania)
- Carries: Usagara–Busisi–Ibisabageni Road (T4)
- Crosses: Gulf of Mwanza
- Locale: Kigongo, Tanzania to Busisi, Tanzania
- Official name: John Pombe Magufuli Bridge

Characteristics
- Material: Steel, concrete
- Total length: 3.2 kilometres (2.0 mi)
- Width: 28.45 metres (93.3 ft)

History
- Construction start: 7 December 2019
- Construction end: 30 May 2025 (expected)
- Construction cost: TZS 716.333 billion
- Opened: 19 June 2025 (expected)

Location
- Interactive map of Kigongo–Busisi Bridge

The Kigongo–Busisi Bridge, officially the John Pombe Magufuli Bridge, is a road bridge in Tanzania, constructed between December 2019 and December 2024.

The bridge spans 3.2 kilometres (2.0 miles) across the Gulf of Mwanza, linking Kigongo in Misungwi District with Busisi in Sengerema District, and connecting to the trunk road that extends through the Geita Region, cutting crossing time from thirty-five minutes by ferry to four minutes by automobile. It is reported to be the longest bridge in East Africa and the sixth-longest on the African continent. The bridge forms a part of the Tanzanian Trunk Road T4. As part of this road infrastructure project, a 35-kilometre (22 mi) tarmacked road will be constructed to link the eastern end of the bridge to the city of Mwanza.

== Location ==
The geographical coordinates of the Kigongo–Busisi Bridge are 02°43'29.0"S, 32°52'21.0"E (Latitude:-2.724722; Longitude:32.872500).

== Overview ==
Before the construction of this bridge, there was no road link between Kigongo and Busisi. A ferry was the only means of connection between the two sides. The ferry takes 35 minutes to travel the distance, but pre-boarding, boarding, travel, and disembarking can last as long as three hours. An average of 1,600 automobiles cross the Gulf of Mwanza using the ferry every 24 hours. This is expected to increase to 10,200 every 24 hours when the bridge is completed, according to the Tanzania National Roads Agency (TANROADS).

In 2019, the government of Tanzania contracted a consortium of two Chinese state-owned engineering and construction companies to design and build this transport infrastructure project. The two firms are China Civil Engineering Construction Corporation (CCECC) and China Railway 15th Bureau (CR15B).

== Construction costs and timeline ==
At the start of construction in December 2019, the contract price was reported as TSh:699 billion, fully funded by the Tanzanian government, with completion initially planned for 2023. In July 2021, the progress of works was reported at 27 percent. At that time, the contract price was reported as US$308.88 million. The new completion date was reported as 2024.

As of July 2022, completion was estimated at 47.3 percent. At that time, a total of 776 jobs had been created by the project, of which 720 jobs (92.8 percent) were filled by Tanzanians and 56 jobs (7.2 percent) were taken up by non-Tanzanians. As of September 2024, completion was reported as 93 percent with commercial commissioning expected in December 2024.

The completed bridge was commercially commissioned by the President of Tanzania Samia Suluhu Hassan in June 2025.

== See also ==
- List of roads in Tanzania
