= Tarime =

Capital of Tarime District, Mara Region

Tarime Mji wa Tarime
- Town
- Nickname: Strong town
- Motto: Mji wa wagumu
- Location in Tanzania
- Coordinates: 01°21′S 34°23′E
- Country: Tanzania
- Region: Mara Region
- District: Tarime District

Government
  - Type: Town Council

Population (2022 census)
  - Total: 133,043
- Time zone: GMT + 3
- Website: Regional website

Tarime is a large town in northwestern Mara Region, Tanzania. The town is the location of the district capital of Tarime District. The main Tanzania-Kenyan border crossing in Sirari is less than 20km away from Tarime and can be reached by following the paved trunk road T4.

According to the 2012 census, the population of Tarime, which comprises Bomani, Nyamisangura and Sabasaba wards, was 33,431. In 2022 census, National Bureau of Statistics Tanzania report the population of Tarime town is 133,043 consist of 8 wards, which are Bomani, Nyamisangura, Sabasaba, Nkende, Nyandoto, Kenyamanyori, Turwa and Kentare.
