= Manga, Tarime =

Ward in Tarime, Mara, Tanzania

Manga Kata ya Manga
- Ward
- Location within Tanzania Location within Africa
- Coordinates: 1°26′49.39″S 34°13′16.99″E
- Country: Tanzania
- Region: Mara Region
- District: Tarime District
- Ward: Manga

Population (2016)
  - Total: 7,999
- Time zone: UTC+3 (EAT)
- Postcode: 31413

Manga is a ward in Tarime District, Mara Region of northern Tanzania, East Africa. In 2016 the Tanzania National Bureau of Statistics report there were 7,999 people in the ward, from 7,249 in 2012.

== Villages / neighborhoods ==
The ward has 3 villages and 19 hamlets.

- Mtana
  - Kebosere
  - Ketasoba
  - Kuruya
  - Mtana Senta
  - Nyabiga
  - Songambele
- Kembwi
  - Buremera
  - Kwigera
  - Nyabosongo
  - Nyankomogo
  - Ryamwenge
- Bisarwi
  - Bisarwi
  - Bukombwe
  - Burimba
  - Burongo
  - Kemonsere
  - Kwikoma
  - Makora
  - Nyamatanke
