= Komaswa =

Ward in Tarime, Mara, Tanzania

Komaswa Kata ya Komaswa
- Ward
- Location within Tanzania Location within Africa
- Coordinates: 1.438°S 34.206°E
- Country: Tanzania
- Region: Mara Region
- District: Tarime District
- Ward: Komaswa

Population (2016)
  - Total: 7,570
- Time zone: UTC+3 (EAT)
- Postcode: 31426

Komaswa is a ward in Tarime District, Mara Region of northern Tanzania, East Africa. In 2016 the Tanzania National Bureau of Statistics report there were 7,570 people in the ward, from 6,860 in 2012.

== Villages / neighborhoods ==
The ward has 3 villages and 14 hamlets.

- Sombanyasoko
  - Kebosere
  - Majimaji
  - Nyangoge
  - Senta
- Nyamirambaro
  - Kwikoma
  - Nyabukano
  - Nyamemange
  - Nyametembe
- Surubu
  - Gabocha
  - Kong'eng'i
  - Mtukura
  - Nyantare
  - Surubu Senta
