= Maswa District =

Maswa District Wilaya ya Maswa
- District
- location within Simiyu Region.
- Coordinates: 03°11′S 033°47′E
- Country: Tanzania
- Region: Simiyu Region

Area
  - Total: 3,667 km^{2} (1,416 sq mi)

Population (2022)
  - Total: 427,864
  - Density: 116.7/km^{2} (302.2/sq mi)

Maswa District is one of the five districts of the Simiyu Region of Tanzania Inhabited by Sukuma people. It is bordered to the north by Magu District and Itilima District, to the east by the Meatu District, to the south by the Kishapu District, and to the west by the Kwimba District. Its administrative centre is the town of Maswa.

According to the 2002 Tanzanian National Census, the population of Maswa District is 304,402. According to the 2022 Tanzania National Census, the population of Maswa District was 427,864

== Transport ==
The major means of transport in Maswa is the land transport which involves private cars, public buses, motorcycles and mostly bicycles which can be seen throughout the district.

The highway that connects Shinyanga Region and Mara Region (trunk road T36) passes through Maswa town.

The Central Line railway from Tabora to Mwanza passes through the district from south to north and there is one train station within the district's boundaries at the village of Malampaka.

== Administrative subdivisions ==
As of 2012, Maswa District was administratively divided into 26 wards.

=== Wards ===
- Badi
- Binza
- Buchambi
- Budekwa
- Busilili
- Dakama
- Ipililo
- Isanga
- Kadoto
- Kulimi
- Lalago
- Malampaka
- Masela
- Mpindo
- Mwamanenge
- Mwamashimba
- Mwang'honoli
- Nguliguli
- Ng'wigwa
- Nyabubinza
- Nyalikungu
- Senani
- Sengwa
- Shishiyu
- Sukuma
- Zanzui
