= T18 road (Tanzania) =

Road in Tanzania

Trunk Road T18
- The T18 is indicated in yellow.

Route information
- Maintained by TANROADS
- Length: 645 km (401 mi)

Major junctions
- East end: T3 in Manyoni
- T22 in Itigi; T8 in Tabora; T9 in Uvinza
- West end: T19 in Kidahwe

Location
- Country: Tanzania
- Regions: Singida, Tabora, Kigoma
- Major cities: Tabora

Highway system
- Transport in Tanzania
← T17	→ T19

The T18 is a Trunk road in Tanzania. The road runs from the T3 major trunk road junction at Manyoni and heads east towards Kigoma through Tabora The roads as it is approximately 645 km (401 mi). The road is not entirely paved and is paved in patches.

== See also ==
- Transport in Tanzania
- List of roads in Tanzania
