= Wami Bridge =

New Wami Bridge Daraja la Wami Mpya (Swahili)
- Coordinates: 6°14′49″S 38°23′13″E
- Carries: T3
- Crosses: Wami River
- Locale: Coast Region, Tanzania
- Owner: Government of Tanzania
- Preceded by: Wami Bridge

Characteristics
- Total length: 510 metres (1,670 ft)
- Width: 11.85 metres (38.9 ft)

History
- Construction cost: US$30,000,000
- Opened: 27 October 2022

Location
- Interactive map of New Wami Bridge

Wami Bridge is a bridge in Tanzania that crosses the Wami River. It lies on the T3 highway between Chalinze and Segera junctions. The bridge was originally built in 1959, however in 2022 the New Wami Bridge was opened 670m next to the old bridge.

== History ==
The Wami Bridge was built by the British colonial government in 1959. The bridge an important link between Dar es Salaam and the capital Dodoma, was a single lane bridge for several years. Along with the steep slopes and sharp turns was a site for various accidents. Construction for the new Wami Bridge to increase the bridge's capacity and safety began in 2020 at a cost of TZS 75 Billion. The new bridge was opened to traffic on 27 October 2022.

Wami Bridge Daraja la Wami (Swahili)
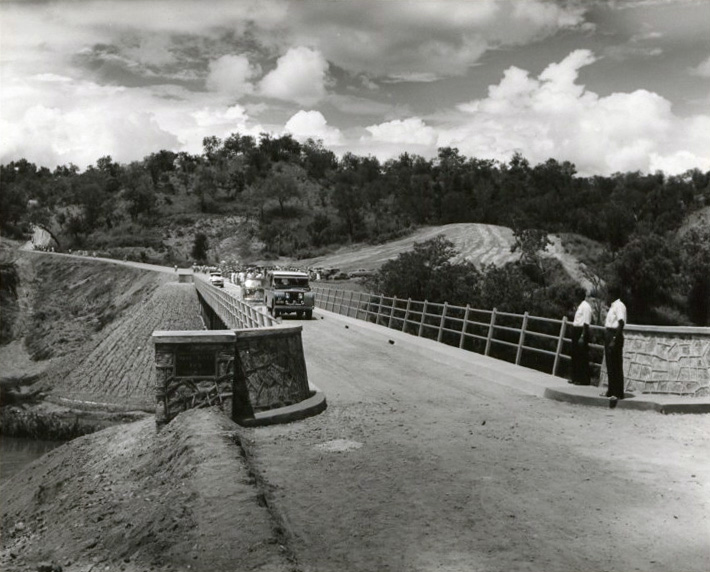
- Coordinates: 6°14′49″S 38°23′13″E
- Carries: T3
- Crosses: Wami River
- Locale: Coast Region, Tanzania
- Other name: Mandera Bridge
- Owner: Government of Tanzania
- Followed by: New Wami Bridge

Characteristics
- Total length: 88.75 metres (291.2 ft)
- Height: 15.24 metres (50.0 ft)

History
- Opened: 1959
- Closed: 2022
