= Kemambo =

Ward in Tarime, Mara, Tanzania

Kemambo Kata ya Kemambo
- Ward
- Location within Tanzania Location within Africa
- Coordinates: 1.487°S 34.558°E
- Country: Tanzania
- Region: Mara Region
- District: Tarime District
- Ward: Kemambo

Population (2016)
  - Total: 14,718
- Time zone: UTC+3 (EAT)
- Postcode: 31419

Kemambo is a ward in Tarime District, Mara Region of northern Tanzania, East Africa. In 2016 the Tanzania National Bureau of Statistics report there were 14,718 people in the ward, from 13,338 in 2012.

== Villages / neighborhoods ==
The ward has 3 villages and 29 hamlets.

- Kewanja
  - Bukube
  - Gonsara
  - Kegonche
  - Kemambo
  - Kenyaitanka
  - Magena
  - Mjini Kati
  - Nyabikondo
  - Nyaiheto
- Mrito
  - Keghati
  - Keisankwe
  - Kengoka
  - Kumchongome
  - Mabera Senta
  - Miriminsi
  - Morongo Senta
  - Nyabiherero
  - Nyambeho
  - Nyangebo
  - Rorya
- Kerende
  - Isakahembe
  - Malera
  - Mogosi
  - Ng'eng'i
  - Ntimaro
  - Nyabuchinchibu
  - Nyamako
  - Nyameng'osa
  - Nyankomogo
