= Magoo =

Magoo may refer to:

== Fictional character ==
- Mr. Magoo, a cartoon character
  - Mr. Magoo (film)

== People/groups of people ==
- Magoo (rapper) (1973–2023), American rapper
- Magoo (Australian producer), Australian music producer
- Chris Exall or Magoo, guitarist for the Anti-Nowhere League
- Tory Christman or Magoo, Church of Scientology critic
- Magoo Marjon, Filipino sports play-by-play commentator
- Magoo (band), an indie rock band from Norfolk, England

== Equipment ==
- DUKW or Magoo, a World War II amphibious vehicle
- Dick Megugorac, an American land speed racer and customizer

== See also ==
- Magu (disambiguation)
