= Nyakonga =

Ward in Tarime District, Tanzania

- Kata ya Nyakonga
- Tarime District area

- Map showing Location of Nyakonga Nyakonga (Africa)
- Coordinates: 1.3507°S 34.5715°E
- Country: Tanzania
- Region: Mara Region
- District: Tarime District
- Ward: Nyakonga
- Village: 3

Government
  - Councilor: Simon Kiles Samwel

Population (2022)
  - Total: 9,215
- Time zone: UTC+3
- Postcode.: 31415
- Website: tarimedc.go.tz

Nyakonga is a ward in Tarime district of the Mara Region, Tanzania. The ward postcode is 31415. According to 2012 census, the ward had a population of 6,797 people. In 2022 census the population of the ward increased to 9,215 people.

== Villages in Nyakonga Ward ==
Nyakonga ward has 3 villages and 12 hamlets.

- Magoto
  - Nyanswega
  - Nyangwe
  - Gakendo
- Kwebweye
  - Komomendi
  - Buchora
  - Komagori
  - Kebweye
  - Senta
  - Nyang'iti
- Nyakonga
  - Nyakonga
  - Mkuyuni
  - Nyamesanga
  - Keburwi

== Services ==
- Education services in Nyakonga ward is available from Pre- Primary school up to Form six. The ward have primary schools in all three villages and one secondary school in Magoto Village known as Magoto Secondary School. Magoto secondary school is a mixed school and have students from form one to form six
- Health care services in Nyakonga ward are available, there is a Pharmacy in both villages, dispensary in Kebweye and Health centre in Magoto.
