= Muriba =

Ward in Tarime, Mara, Tanzania

Muriba Kata ya Muriba
- Ward
- Location within Tanzania
- Coordinates: 1.3957609°S 34.629527°E
- Country: Tanzania
- Region: Mara Region
- District: Tarime District
- Ward: Muriba

Population (2016)
  - Total: 11,985
- Time zone: UTC+3 (EAT)
- Postcode: 31420

Muriba is a ward in Tarime District, Mara Region of northern Tanzania, East Africa. In 2016 the Tanzania National Bureau of Statistics report there were 11,985 people in the ward, from 10,861 in 2012.

== Villages / neighborhoods ==
The ward has 4 villages and 19 hamlets.

- Muriba
  - Biasinda
  - Kebose
  - Keryoba
  - Kumwika
  - Kumwika Senta
- Tagare
  - Isarara
  - Mekoma
  - Muriba
  - Rechuma
  - Tagare
- Bungurere
  - Bugucha
  - Bungurere Senta
  - Ikoro
  - Kebononari
  - Kogesangora
- Kobori
  - Gukinisya
  - Kobori Senta
  - Kwiriba
  - Nyantare
