= T23 road (Tanzania) =

Road in Tanzania

Trunk Road T23
- The T23 is indicated in yellow.

Route information
- Maintained by TANROADS
- Length: 261 km (162 mi)

Major junctions
- West end: T9 in Mpanda
- East end: T8 in Ipole

Location
- Country: Tanzania
- Regions: Tabora, Katavi
- Major cities: Mpanda

Highway system
- Transport in Tanzania
| ← T22 | → T26 |

The T23 is a Trunk road in Tanzania. The road runs east from Mpanda at the T9 Trunk Road junction towards Ipole ending at the T8 Trunk Road junction. The roads as it is approximately 261 km (162 mi). The road is now paved.

== See also ==
- Transport in Tanzania
- List of roads in Tanzania
