= Matongo =

Ward in Tarime, Mara, Tanzania

Matongo Kata ya Matongo
- Ward
- Location within Tanzania Location within Africa
- Coordinates: 1.467°S 34.471°E
- Country: Tanzania
- Region: Mara Region
- District: Tarime District
- Ward: Matongo

Population (2016)
  - Total: 21,160
- Time zone: UTC+3 (EAT)
- Postcode: 31412

Matongo (Tarime) is a ward in the Tarime District of the Mara Region of Tanzania, East Africa. In 2016 the Tanzania National Bureau of Statistics report there were 21,160 people in the ward, from 19,176 in 2012.

== Villages / neighborhoods ==
The ward has 4 villages and 30 hamlets.

- Nyangoto
  - Botanga
  - Kegonga A
  - Kegonga B
  - Kemagutu
  - Kenyangi
  - Kwinyunyi
  - Masangora
  - Nyabibago
  - Nyamerama
  - Senta shule
- Nyabichune
  - Kemachale
  - Komaware
  - Kwimange
  - Masinki
  - Nyabichune
  - Nyarero
- Mjini Kati
  - Kebamonche
  - Mjini Kati
  - Mlimani
  - Nyabikondo
  - Nyankuru
  - Sungusungu
- Matongo
  - Botanga
  - Kemagutu
  - Kenyangi
  - Kwinyunyi
  - Masangora
  - Nyabibago
  - Nyamerama
  - Senta shule
