= Binagi =

Ward in Tarime, Mara, Tanzania

Binagi Kata ya
- Ward
- Location within Tanzania Location within Africa
- Coordinates: 1.356°S 34.467°E
- Country: Tanzania
- Region: Mara Region
- District: Tarime District
- Ward: Binagi

Population (2016)
  - Total: 10,420
- Time zone: UTC+3 (EAT)
- Postcode: 31410

Binagi is a ward in Tarime District, Mara Region of northern Tanzania, East Africa. In 2016 the Tanzania National Bureau of Statistics report there were 10,420 people in the ward, from 9,443 in 2012.

== Villages / neighborhoods ==
The ward has 3 villages and 21 hamlets.

- Nyamwigura
  - Gwisana
  - Ihitya
  - Kemela
  - Kesingaka
  - Kwiriba
  - Manyenya
  - Masana
  - Nyamatagito
  - Senta
  - ketoka
- Magoma
  - Makonge
  - Muhuru
  - Nyamerenge
  - Nyamesocho
  - Nyatahania
  - Senta
- Nyasaricho
  - Buchora
  - Bukonge
  - Nyabahengere
  - Nyamihuto
  - Senta
