= Itiryo =

Ward in Tarime, Mara, Tanzania

Itiryo Kata ya Itiryo
- Ward
- Location within Tanzania Location within Africa
- Coordinates: 1.393°S 34.687°E
- Country: Tanzania
- Region: Mara Region
- District: Tarime District
- Ward: Itiryo

Population (2016)
  - Total: 11,004
- Time zone: UTC+3 (EAT)
- Postcode: 31428

Itiryo is a ward in Tarime District, Mara Region of northern Tanzania, East Africa. In 2016 the Tanzania National Bureau of Statistics report there were 11,004 people in the ward, from 9,972 in 2012.

== Villages / neighborhoods ==
The ward has 3 villages and 15 hamlets.

- Itiryo
  - Itiryo Senta
  - Kwigogo
  - Kwirambo
  - Manyata
  - Nyaitebe
- Kangariani
  - Birandi
  - Birira Senta
  - Isago
  - Kangariani Senta
  - Segesai
- Nyankoni
  - Bikonge
  - Gitimama
  - Kwihango
  - Nyankoni
  - Tissya
