= Mbogi =

Ward in Tarime, Mara, Tanzania

Mbogi Kata ya Mbogi
- Ward
- Location within Tanzania
- Coordinates: 1.3003°S 34.553°E
- Country: Tanzania
- Region: Mara Region
- District: Tarime District
- Ward: Mbogi

Population (2016)
  - Total: 8,964
- Time zone: UTC+3 (EAT)
- Postcode: 31424

Mbogi is a ward in Tarime District, Mara Region of northern Tanzania, East Africa. In 2016 the Tanzania National Bureau of Statistics report there were 8,964 people in the ward, from 8,124 in 2012.

== Villages / neighborhoods ==
The ward has 3 villages and 19 hamlets.

- Nyabitocho
  - Getaigoro
  - Gokebose
  - Mbogi
  - Nyabinembu
  - Nyabitocho
  - Stend
- Borega "B"
  - Borega Senta
  - Kenyabwegenye
  - Kogaini
  - Kubiritoho
  - Mugoyega
  - Renyamwarya
- Getenga
  - Getenga
  - Kebeyo
  - Kitagutiti
  - Masurura
  - Nyamemba
  - Nyarogatai
  - Rooko
