= Genyange =

Ward in Tarime, Mara, Tanzania

Genyange Kata ya Genyange
- Ward
- Location within Tanzania Location within Africa
- Coordinates: 1°20′4″S 34°35′29″E
- Country: Tanzania
- Region: Mara Region
- District: Tarime District
- Ward: Genyange
- Elevation: 1,768 m (5,801 ft)

Population (2016)
  - Total: 8,224
- Time zone: UTC+3 (EAT)
- Postcode: 31430
- Geocode: 11005162

Genyange is a ward in Tarime District, Mara Region of northern Tanzania, East Africa. In 2016 the Tanzania National Bureau of Statistics report that there were 8,224 people in the ward, from 7,453 in 2012.

Genyange is situated near another locality Nyamtiro and the village Nyabasi.

== Villages / neighborhoods ==
The ward has 3 villages and 12 hamlets.

- Ganyange
  - Gantende
  - Meserere
  - Ntagacha
  - Nyambili
  - Nyamosense
- Borega "A"
  - Borega Mjini
  - Komagori
  - Manyumba
  - Mesocho
- Nyakalima
  - Kegonche
  - Kengabi
  - Nyasangai
