= Meatu District =

- District
- location within Simiyu Region.
- Coordinates: 03°32′S 34°19′E
- Country: Tanzania
- Region: Simiyu Region

Area
  - Total: 9,018 km^{2} (3,482 sq mi)

Population (2022)
  - Total: 366,941
  - Density: 40.69/km^{2} (105.4/sq mi)

Meatu District is one of the five districts of the Simiyu Region of Tanzania. It is bordered to the north by the Itilima District, to the west by the Maswa District and Shinyanga Region to the east by the Arusha Region, to the southeast by the Manyara Region and to the south by the Singida Region. Its district capital is the town of Mwanhuzi.

The district has a total population of about 366,941 people, that's according to the 2022 National census.

== Transport ==
There are various means of transport in Meatu district mostly being land transport such as private cars, public buses, motorcycles and bicycles.

Unpaved Trunk road T37 from Shinyanga to Singida Region passes through the district.

== Administrative subdivisions ==
As of 2012, Meatu District was administratively divided into 25 wards.

=== Wards ===
- Bukundi
- Imalaseko
- Itinje
- Kimali
- Kisesa
- Lingeka
- Lubiga
- Mwabuma
- Mwabusalu
- Mwabuzo
- Mwakisandu
- Mwamalole
- Mwamanimba
- Mwamanongu
- Mwamishali
- Mwandoya
- Mwangundo
- Mwanhuzi
- Mwanjolo
- Mwanyahina
- Mwasengela
- Nghoboko
- Nkoma
- Sakasaka
- Tindabuligi

== Sources ==
- Meatu District Homepage for the 2002 Tanzania National Census
