= Mwema =

Ward in Tarime, Mara, Tanzania

Mwema Kata ya Mwema
- Ward
- Location within Tanzania
- Coordinates: 1.2234°S 34.3854°E
- Country: Tanzania
- Region: Mara Region
- District: Tarime District
- Ward: Mwema

Population (2016)
  - Total: 11,260
- Time zone: UTC+3 (EAT)
- Postcode: 31408

Mwema(Tarime) is a ward in Tarime District, Mara Region of northern Tanzania, East Africa. In 2016 the Tanzania National Bureau of Statistics report there were 11,260 people in the ward, from 10,204 in 2012.

== Villages / neighborhoods ==
The ward has 4 villages and 19 hamlets.

- Korotambe
  - Kokeregeya
  - Mwema
  - Nyabichune
  - Nyamusi
  - Senta
  - Wakulima
- Nyakangara
  - Gwikongore
  - Nchoke
  - Renyankomo
- Nyamohonda
  - Ibokoho
  - Kokebabe
  - Kwigenge
  - Nyambega
  - Nyamohonda
- Kubiterere
  - Mlimani
  - Nyakunguru
  - Nyambache
  - Nyansine
  - Senta
