= T9 road (Tanzania) =

Road in Tanzania

Trunk Road T9
- The T9 is indicated in yellow.

Route information
- Maintained by TANROADS

Major junctions
- North end: T4 in Biharamulo
- T3 in Lusahunga; T3 in Nyakanazi; T19 in Kasulu; T18 in Uvinza; T23 in Mpanda; T20 in Sumbawanga
- South end: T1 in Tunduma

Location
- Country: Tanzania
- Regions: Kagera, Kigoma, Katavi, Rukwa, Songwe
- Major cities: Biharamulo, Kasulu, Mpanda, Sumbawanga, Tunduma

Highway system
- Transport in Tanzania
← T8	→ T10

The T9 is a Trunk road in Tanzania. The road runs from Biharamulo in Kagera along the western zones of the country through to Tunduma forming a junction at the Tanzam Highway. The roads as it is approximately 881 km (547 mi). The road is partially paved, with the biggest unpaved section being from Mpanda to Biharamulo. As of November 2021, the route is the longest unpaved section of the National Trunk road system.

== Route description ==
Between the 15 km (9.3 mi) stretch from Nyakanazi to Lusahunga, the T9 trunk road shares its designation with the T3 trunk road.

Within Uvinza, there is a 4 km (2.5 mi) stretch of the T9 trunk road that shares its designation with T18 trunk road.

== See also ==
- Transport in Tanzania
- List of roads in Tanzania
