= Kibasuka =

Ward in Tarime, Mara, Tanzania

Kibasuka Kata ya Kibasuka
- Ward
- Location within Tanzania Location within Africa
- Coordinates: 1.433°S 34.431°E
- Country: Tanzania
- Region: Mara Region
- District: Tarime District
- Ward: Kibasuka

Population (2016)
  - Total: 16,703
- Time zone: UTC+3 (EAT)
- Postcode: 31411

Kibasuka is a ward in Tarime District, Mara Region of northern Tanzania, East Africa. In 2016 the Tanzania National Bureau of Statistics report there were 16,703 people in the ward, from 15,137 in 2012.

== Villages / neighborhoods ==
The ward has 4 villages and 31 hamlets.

- Nyarwana
  - Kemotya
  - Kenyarobi
  - Mekende
  - Mwara
  - Nyabokaragati Senta
  - Nyabori
  - Nyahongo
  - Nyansurura
  - Nyarwana Senta
- Nyakunguru
  - Gwikongo
  - Itandura
  - Mochongocho
  - Nyakunguru Senta
  - Nyamanche
  - Nyamichale
  - Nyamuma
  - Nyankorambe Senta
  - Seregeta
  - Turuturu
- Weigita
  - Bonsabi
  - Bunchari
  - Kemorabu
  - Nyairema
  - Nyambeche
  - Nyanchage
  - Senta
- Keisaka
  - Bikarabwa
  - Gwitende
  - Keisaka
  - Kubirera
  - Songambele
