= Itilima District =

Itilima District Wilaya ya Itilima
- District
- location within Simiyu Region.
- Coordinates: 02°59′S 033°56′E
- Country: Tanzania
- Region: Simiyu Region

Area
  - Total: 4,690 km^{2} (1,810 sq mi)

Population (2022)
  - Total: 419,213
  - Density: 89.4/km^{2} (232/sq mi)

Itilima District is one of the five districts of Simiyu Region of Tanzania, East Africa. Its district capital is Lagangabilili. It is bordered to the north by Bariadi District, to the east by Ngorongoro District, to the south by Maswa District and Meatu District, and to the west by Magu District.

As of 2022, the population of Itilima was 419,213. Itilima was established in 2012, when it was split off from Bariadi District and became part of the newly established Simiyu Region.

== Transport ==
The highway that connects Shinyanga Region and Mara Region (trunk road T36) passes through Itilima district from south to north.

== Tourism ==
The east of Itilima District is part of Maswa Game Reserve.

== Administrative subdivisions ==
=== Wards ===
As of 2012, Itilima District was administratively divided into 22 wards.

==== 2012 wards ====
The 22 wards in 2012:

- Budalabujiga
- Bumera
- Chinamili
- Ikindiro
- Kinang'weli
- Lagangabilili
- Lugulu
- Mbita
- Mhunze
- Migato
- Mwalushu
- Mwamapalala
- Mwamtani
- Mwaswale
- Ndolelezi
- Nhobora
- Nkoma
- Nkuyu
- Nyamalapa
- Sagata
- Sawida
- Zagayu
