= Nyamwaga =

- Ward
- Location within Tanzania Location within Africa
- Coordinates: 1.393553971631574°S 34.579145943042825°E
- Country: Tanzania
- Region: Mara Region
- District: Tarime District

Population (2022)
  - Total: 21,302
- Time zone: UTC+3 (EAT)
- Postcode: 31417

Nyamwaga is a rural ward located in the Tarime district in the Mara region in northwest Tanzania. It is one of the wards surrounding the North Mara Goldmine.

== Villages and Hamlets ==
The ward consists of 5 villages (kijiji), which are further divided into 26 hamlets (kitongoji):

- Keisangora
  - Maruru
  - Keisunguruta
  - Keruta
  - Senta
  - Nyamerama
  - Gonyi
  - Matongo
- Nyamwaga
  - Nyamwaga Senta
  - Mesero
  - Muchanchara
  - Makerero
- Kimusi
  - Gwikuniri
  - Nyamahiriri
  - Kimusi Senta
  - Bokara Senta
  - Nyarusiaga
  - Melale
  - Nyamosaro
- Komarera
  - Komarera
  - Ntarechagini
  - Kokemange
  - Moharango
- Gwitare
  - Nyamiobo
  - Gwitare Senta
  - Bwengeri
  - Ronkor

== Demographics ==
Historical Population Figures
| | 2002 | 2012 | 2016 | 2022 |
|---|---|---|---|---|
| Population | 12,120 | 13,917 | 15,357 | 21,302 |
| Households | 2,261 | 2,729 | N/A | 4,277 |
| Average household size | 5.4 | 5.1 | N/A | 5.0 |
