= Gorong'a =

Ward in Tarime, Mara, Tanzania

Gorong'a Kata ya Gorong'a
- Ward
- Location within Tanzania Location within Africa
- Coordinates: 1.447°S 34.694°E
- Country: Tanzania
- Region: Mara Region
- District: Tarime District
- Ward: Gorong'a

Population (2016)
  - Total: 12,206
- Time zone: UTC+3 (EAT)
- Postcode: 31422

Gorong'a is a ward in Tarime District, Mara Region of northern Tanzania, East Africa. In 2016 the Tanzania National Bureau of Statistics report there were 12,206 people in the ward, from 11,062 in 2012.

== Villages / neighborhoods ==
The ward has 4 villages and 20 hamlets.

- Kitawasi
  - Gibasisi
  - Kitawasi Senta
  - Moharango
  - Nyabori
  - Remarera
- Masurura
  - Kemoseti
  - Keweirumbe
  - Masurura
  - Nyaichirichiri
  - Nyantare
- Masanga
  - Kemangari
  - Kemosahe
  - Kwigori
  - Masanga Senta
  - Nyamerama Senta
  - Tigite
- Kenyamosabi
  - Kenyamosabi
  - Kioboke
  - Ngonche
  - Nyamagongwe
