= Kasoli =

Kasoli is a village in Muzaffarnagar Tehsil, Uttar Pradesh, India. Kasoli is also a gram panchayat.PUNDIR Village Kasoli

The total geographical area of village is 547.09 hectares. Kasoli has a total population of 5,155 people. There are about 858 houses in Kasoli. Charthawal is nearest town to Kasoli which is approximately 7 km away.
