= Isebania, Kenya =

- Location in Kenya
- Coordinates: 01°14′32″S 34°28′36″E
- Country: Kenya
- County: Migori County
- Elevation: 4,993 ft (1,522 m)
- Time zone: UTC+3 (EAT)

Isbania, also Isibania, is a town in Migori County of Kenya, at the International border with Tanzania.

== Location ==
The town sits at the border, directly across from the town of Isebania, Tanzania, approximately 24 kilometres (15 mi), by road, south of Migori, the location of the district headquarters. This is approximately 200 kilometres (124 mi) south of Kisumu, the nearest large city. The coordinates of the town are: 1°14'32.0"S, 34°28'36.0"E (Latitude:-1.242219; Longitude:34.476672).

== Overview ==
The town is the southern end of the Isebania–Kisii–Ahero Road. In addition to the highway, other roads in the town are being tarmacked.

== See also ==
- List of roads in Kenya
- Isebania, Tanzania
