= Kiore, Tarime =

Ward in Tarime, Mara, Tanzania

Kiore Kata ya Kiore
- Ward
- Location within Tanzania Location within Africa
- Coordinates: 1.434°S 34.35°E
- Country: Tanzania
- Region: Mara Region
- District: Tarime District
- Ward: Kiore

Population (2016)
  - Total: 8,850
- Time zone: UTC+3 (EAT)
- Postcode: 31425

Kiore is a ward in Tarime District, Mara Region of northern Tanzania, East Africa. In 2016 the Tanzania National Bureau of Statistics report there were 8,850 people in the ward, from 8,020 in 2012.

== Villages / neighborhoods ==
The ward has 3 villages and 20 hamlets.

- Nkerege
  - Bisarwa
  - Hazina
  - Masota
  - Nyabosongo
  - Nyakiyongi
  - Senta
  - Tigiri
- Nyagisya
  - Itacho
  - Kinyabaikwabe
  - Kiore
  - Kwigori
  - Masurura
  - Nyahongo
  - Senta
- Kewamamba
  - Geokoru
  - Kewairungu
  - Kewanyango
  - Magaka
  - Magange
  - Nyamang'ari
