= Bomani (Tarime) =

Ward in Tarime, Mara, Tanzania

Bomani Kata ya Bomani
- Ward
- Location within Tanzania Location within Africa
- Coordinates: 1.348°S 34.372°E
- Country: Tanzania
- Region: Mara Region
- District: Tarime District
- Ward: Bomani

Population (2016)
  - Total: 10,113
- Time zone: UTC+3 (EAT)
- Postcode: 31401

Bomani is a ward in Tarime District, Mara Region of northern Tanzania, East Africa. In 2016 the Tanzania National Bureau of Statistics report there were 10,113 people in the ward, from 9,165 in 2012.

Bomani Ward involves seven The ward has 7 villages.

- Anglikana
- Biambwi
- Bomani
- Buhemba
- Magereza
- Mawasiliano
- NHC
