= Tarime District =

Tarime District Wilaya ya Tarime
- District
- Tarime District of Mara Region
- Coordinates: 01°20′S 034°23′E
- Country: Tanzania
- Region: Mara Region

Area
  - Total: 1,371 km^{2} (529 sq mi)

Population (2022)
  - Total: 404,848
  - Density: 295.3/km^{2} (764.8/sq mi)
- Website: Regional website

Tarime District is one of the seven districts of the Mara Region of Tanzania, East Africa. It was previously known as the "North Mara District". Its district capital is Tarime town. It is bordered from the north to east by the Kenyan districts of Migori, Trans Mara and Kuria East and West Districts, and to the east by the Maasai Mara game reserve. To the south, it is bordered across the Mara River by the Serengeti and Butiama districts, and to the west by Rorya District.

North Mara Gold Mine is located within the Tarime District. It is operated by Acacia Mining.

According to the 2002 Tanzania National Census, the population of the Tarime District was 492,798. According to the 2022 Tanzania National Census, the population of Tarime District was 404,848.

== Transport ==
The natives of Tarime use land transport in their daily lives from private cars to public cars.

Paved trunk road T4 from Mwanza to the Kenyan border passes through the district. The main border crossing from Tanzania to Kenya in the Lake Victoria zone is located at Sirari, which is also a ward of Tarime District.

== Administrative subdivisions ==
In 2002 Tarime District contained 41 wards, but since the separation off of Rorya District in 2007, Tarime District has been reduced to fewer wards. As of 2012, Tarime District was administratively divided into 30 wards.

=== Wards ===
- Binagi
- Bomani
- Bumera
- Genyange
- Gorong'a
- Itiryo
- Kemambo
- Kentare
- Kibasuka
- Kiore
- Komaswa
- Manga
- Matongo
- Mbogi
- Muriba
- Mwema
- Nyakonga
- Gwitiryo
- Nyamisangura
- Nyamwaga
- Nyangoto
- Nyamongo
- Nyansicha
- Nyanungu
- Nyarero
- Nyarokoba
- Nyabichune
- Mjini Kati
- Pemba
- Sabasaba
- Sirari
- Susuni
- Turwa
