= Bumera =

Ward in Tarime, Mara, Tanzania

Bumera Kata ya Bumera
- Ward
- Location within Tanzania Location within Africa
- Coordinates: 1.289°S 34.299°E
- Country: Tanzania
- Region: Mara Region
- District: Tarime District
- Ward: Bumera

Population (2016)
  - Total: 10,594
- Time zone: UTC+3 (EAT)
- Postcode: 31406

Bumera is a ward in Tarime District, Mara Region of northern Tanzania, East Africa. In 2016 the Tanzania National Bureau of Statistics report there were 10,594 people in the ward, from 9,601 in 2012.

== Villages / neighborhoods ==
The ward has 4 villages and 28 hamlets.

- Kitenga
  - Buguta
  - Kenyabwiri
  - Kurumwa
  - Kwiraha
  - Kyeya
  - Mekoma
  - Nyerema
  - Ryamoncho
  - Senta
- Kiterere
  - Bangura
  - Butobori
  - Sakaryakanya
  - Sookologi
- Turugeti
  - Gwiko
  - Mabute
  - Mang'ore
  - Nguku
  - Nyatekere
  - Runyerere
  - Songambele
- Kwisarara
  - Bukiro
  - Bunyama
  - Kegomba
  - Mahirinya
  - Nyakunguru
  - Nyarero
  - Senta
