= Simiyu River =

River in Simiyu Region, Tanzania

- Native name: Mto Simiyu (Sukuma)

Location
- Country: Tanzania
- State: Simiyu Region and Arusha Region

Physical characteristics
- Source
  - elevation: 1,680 m (5,510 ft)
- Mouth
  - location: Speke Gulf, Lake Victoria
  - coordinates: 02°31′49″S 033°25′11″E
  - elevation: 1,133 m (3,717 ft)
- Length: 180 km (110 mi)
- Basin size: 10,800 km^{2} (4,200 sq mi)
- Discharge
  - minimum: 0 m^{3}/s (0 cu ft/s) (dry season)
  - maximum: 200 m^{3}/s (7,100 cu ft/s) (rainy season)

Basin features
- Tributaries
  - right: Duma River (Tanzania)

The Simiyu River is a river located in Simiyu Region and Arusha Region, Tanzania. It flows into Lake Victoria in the African Great Lakes region. As one of the six main inlets to Lake Victoria, it forms part of the upper headwaters of the Nile. The Simiyu Region is named after the river.

== Geography ==
The river's source is on the western slopes of Mount Loolmalasin and the Ngorongoro Highlands in Arusha Region. It flows though the southern portion of the Serengeti National Park into Magu Bay of the Speke Gulf of Lake Victoria. The Simiyu has two main tributaries entering from the right, the Duma River and the Komahola River, and one from the left the Maloho River. There is considerable farming in the lower reaches of the Simiyu Basin, which causes runoff of fertilizers and pesticides. The delta of the Simiyu is a marsh that starts just downstream from the town of Magu. Upstream from Magu just below the Ndagalu Forest Reserve is the village of Samilunga.

== History ==
In 1875, Henry Morton Stanley was the first European to sight the Simiyu River.

== Climate ==
There are two rainy seasons, the light one from November into January, and the heavy one from March to May, which result in 700 to 1000 mm of annual rainfall. Less than 10% of the rainfall makes it to the mouth of the river due to a very high evapotranspiration rate.

== Hydrometrie ==
Average monthly flow of Simiyu measured at the hydrological station in Magu Mjini Estate, about 10 km above the mouth in m³ / s (1999–2004). The Simiyu flows stimulate time-dependent, like most rivers in the region.
