= Kentare =

Ward in Tarime, Mara, Tanzania

Kentare Kata ya Kentare
- Ward
- Location within Tanzania Location within Africa
- Coordinates: 1.356°S 34.436°E
- Country: Tanzania
- Region: Mara Region
- District: Tarime District
- Ward: Kentare

Population (2016)
  - Total: 10,455
- Time zone: UTC+3 (EAT)
- Postcode: 31429

Kentare is a ward in Tarime District, Mara Region of northern Tanzania, East Africa. In 2016 the Tanzania National Bureau of Statistics report there were 10,455 people in the ward, from 9,475 in 2012.

== Villages / neighborhoods ==
The ward has 13 villages.

- Binagi
- Butirya
- Kedeli
- Kibumayi
- Kitatukya
- Kwigoronto
- Maruru
- Mogabiri centre
- Nsomba
- Nyagasara
- Nyamaisana
- Nyamasamore
- Nyamiobo
