= Bariadi District =

District in Simiyu Region, Tanzania

Coordinates: 02°45′S 34°30′E

Bariadi
- Town
- location within Simiyu Region.
- Country: Tanzania
- Region: Simiyu
- District: Bariadi

Bariadi District is one of the five districts of the Simiyu Region of Tanzania, East Africa. As of 2022, the population was 383,385.

== History ==
Prior to 2012, Bariadi District was part of Shinyanga Region.

== Economy ==
The Dutwa Ward contains one of the world's largest nickel deposits.

== Wards ==
As of 2002, Bariadi District was administratively divided into twenty-six wards:

- Bariadi
- Bumera
- Bunamhala
- Chinamili
- Dutwa
- Gamboshi
- Ikungulyabashashi
- Kasoli
- Kinang'weli
- Lagangabilili
- Lugulu
- Mbita
- Mhango
- Mhunze
- Mwadobana
- Mwamapalala
- Mwaswale
- Mwaubingi
- Nkololo
- Nkoma
- Nyakabindi
- Sagata
- Sakwe
- Sapiwi
- Somanda
- Zagayu
