= Nzega =

- City
- Location in Tanzania
- Coordinates: 04°13′01″S 33°11′11″E
- Country: Tanzania
- Region: Tabora Region
- District: Nzega District

Population (2022 census)
  - Total: 125,193
- Time zone: GMT + 3
- Climate: Aw

Nzega is a city in central Tanzania. It is the district headquarter of Nzega District.

== Transport ==
Paved Trunk roads T3 from Morogoro to the Rwanda border and T8 from Tabora to Mwanza meet in Nzega town.

== Population ==
According to the 2012 national census the population of Nzega town (Nzega Mjini Ward) is 34,744.
