= Rungwa (Tanzanian ward) =

Administrative ward in Tanzania

Rungwa Kata ya Rungwa
- Ward
- Location within Tanzania
- Coordinates: 6.9377373°S 33.522505°E
- Country: Tanzania
- Region: Singida Region
- District: Manyoni District
- Ward: Rungwa

Population (2016)
  - Total: 2,424
- Time zone: UTC+3 (EAT)

Rungwa is an administrative ward in the Manyoni District of the Singida Region of Tanzania. In 2016 the Tanzania National Bureau of Statistics report there were 2,424 people in the ward, from 2,209 in 2012.
