= Magu, Tanzania =

Magu
- Town
- Location in Tanzania
- Coordinates: 02°35′S 33°26′E
- Country: Tanzania
- Region: Mwanza Region
- District: Magu District

Government
  - Type: Town Council

Population (2022 census)
  - Total: 35,000
- Time zone: GMT + 3

Magu is a town in Mwanza Region of Tanzania, East Africa. It is the administrative seat of Magu District, one of the seven districts of Mwanza Region. The distance from Magu to Mwanza town is around 60 kilometres. According to the national census of 2012, the population of Magu – Magu Mjini in Swahili – was 23,822.

Paved trunk road T4 from Mwanza to the Kenyan border runs through Magu town.
