= Bariadi =

Town and capital of Simiyu Region, Tanzania

- City of Simiyu Region
- location within Simiyu Region.
- Coordinates: 02°47′31″S 33°59′22″E
- Country: Tanzania
- Region: Simiyu
- District: Bariadi

Government
  - Type: Town Council
- Elevation: 4,173 ft (1,272 m)

Population (2022 census)
  - Total: 260,927
- Time zone: GMT + 3

Bariadi is a Tanzanian town and regional capital of Simiyu Region, and the is also administrative seat of Bariadi District. Bariadi also refers to Bariadi Ward, another administrative unit in the district.

== Location ==
Bariadi is located in Bariadi Ward, Bariadi District, Simiyu Region, in Tanzania. The town is approximately 144 kilometres (89 mi) east of Mwanza, the nearest large city. Musoma, another large city, is located approximately 166 kilometres (103 mi) north of Bariadi.

The geographical coordinates of Bariadi are:02°47'31.0"S, 33°59'22.0"E (Latitude:-2.791944; Longitude:33.989444). The town sits at an average elevation of 1,272 metres (4,173 ft) above mean sea level.

== Overview ==
Bariadi was elevated to Town Council Status in 2012. Bariadi Town Council covers an area measuring 876.71 square kilometres (338.50 mi^{2}). It comprises ten wards; Bariadi, Somanda, Sima, Malambo, Nyangokolwa, Guduwi, Nyakabindi and Bunahmala.

According to the satellite map of the town, Bariadi as several primary and secondary schools, several churches of various religious denominations, a number of restaurants and branches of two of Tanzania's largest banks; CRDB Bank and National Microfinance Bank.

== Population ==
The population of Bariadi Town Council, as constituted in 2012, comprising 10 wards, was 155,620 of whom 81,772 (52.55 percent) were female and 73,848 (47.45 percent) were male, with an annual population growth rate of 2.048 percent. The average family size was 6.4 people, according to the 2012 national population census.

== Climate ==
The town has two seasons; (a) a rainy season that begins around mid-October and stretches until mid-May, with a dry spell in January, and (b) a dry season that begins in mid-May and lasts until mid-October. Annual total rainfall averages between 600 millimetres (24 in) and 900 millimetres (35 in).

== Transport ==
The paved 368 kilometres (229 mi) Isebania–Shinyanga Road, passes through the town, in a general north to south direction.
