= Kisesa =

Ward in Magu, Mwanza, Tanzania

Kisesa Kata ya Kisesa
- Ward
- Location within Tanzania
- Coordinates: 2.5550677°S 33.04438539°E
- Country: Tanzania
- Region: Mwanza Region
- District: Magu District
- Ward: Kisesa

Population (2016)
  - Total: 9,889
- Time zone: UTC+3 (EAT)
- Postcode: 33409

Kisesa is an administrative ward in the Magu District of the Mwanza Region of Tanzania. In 2016 the Tanzania National Bureau of Statistics report there were 9,889 people in the ward, from 30,486 in 2012.

== Villages ==
The ward has 22 villages.

- Nyang’hulukulu
- Ilagaja
- Igunga
- Igekemaja
- Ihale
- Wita
- Iseni bondeni “A”
- Iseni Bondeni “B”
- Kisesa kusini
- Igeye
- Changabe
- Kitumba A
- Kitumba B
- Igudija A
- Igudija B
- Gungumuli
- Igandya
- Kisha
- Mondo
- Kimanga
- Nyawipija
- Ng'wabupolo
