= Rusumo, Tanzania =

Rusumo
- Town
- Location of Rusumo, Tanzania Rusumo Town (Africa) Rusumo Town (Tanzania)
- Coordinates: 02°23′05″S 30°47′01″E
- Country: Tanzania
- Region: Kagera Region
- District: Ngara District
- Time zone: UTC+03:00
- Area code: 028
- Climate: Aw
- Website: www.kagera.go.tz

Rusumo is a town in northwestern Tanzania, at the border with Rwanda. It sits across the Kagera River from Rusumo, Rwanda.

== Location ==
Rusumo is a town in Ngara District, in the Kagera Region of Tanzania. It is approximately 20 kilometres (12 mi), by road north-west of Nyakasanza, the nearest town. This is approximately 30 kilometres (19 mi), by road, north-east of Ngara, where the district headquarters are located. The geographical coordinates of Rusumo, Tanzania are: 2°23'05.0"S, 30°47'01.0"E (Latitude:-2.384722; Longitude:30.783611).

== Overview ==
Rusumo is described as a Rural Ward, one of twenty, in Ngara District. Rusumo Falls, on the Kagera River, lies across the river, partly within this town, and partly in neighboring Rusumo, Rwanda. Rusumo Hydroelectric Power Station, currently under construction, also partly lies within this location.

The town is served by a One-Stop-Border-Post (OSBP), housing both customs and immigration services of both countries, in one location. Arriving vehicles and passengers and their goods and luggage are processed once in one office by officers from both countries.

== Transport ==
The main highway B3, from Isaka, passes through Rusumo, Tanzania, and enters Rusumo, Rwanda and continues to Kigali as Highway RN3. In 2014, Japanese and indigenous engineers and technicians completed the construction of the New Rusumo Bridge. The bridge, built with a grant of US$30 million, donated by the Japan International Cooperation Agency (JICA). The work included building the new bridge, access roads, truck parks and the OSBPs, housing immigration and customs areas in both countries.

== Population ==
According to the 2012 national census the population of Rusumo Ward (Rusumo Rural), was enumerated at 12,925 people, of whom 6,428 (49.7 percent) were males and 6,497 (50.3 percent) were females.
