= Lamadi =

Lamadi Lamadi
- Town
- Nickname: LamTown
- Motto: Hapa kazi tu
- Location in Tanzania
- Coordinates: 02°14′S 33°51′E
- Country: Tanzania
- Region: Simiyu
- District: Busega

Population (2012)
  - Total: 22,062
- Time zone: GMT + 3

Lamadi is a town and a ward in Busega District of Simiyu Region, Tanzania. It is located on the shore of Lake Victoria. On 'dala dala' mini-busses in the area, the town's name is sometimes misspelled as 'Ramadi' the town have street (mitaa) that are Itongo, Makanisani, Majengo, Msekula Road, Mwalukonge and three village that are Lukungu, Mwabayanda and Kalago (Mwabulugu Lakeshore) The main tribes in Lamadi Town are Sukuma, Jita, Kurya, Zanaki, Luo and Waha from Kigoma. The people like to visit Lamadi Town because is fevered by many attraction.

According to the 2012 census, the population of Lamadi ward is 22,062.

== Transport ==
Lamadi is connected by two well-maintained and paved national trunk roads. The Mwanza-Musoma highway (trunk road T4) runs through the town from south to north. The highway that connects Shinyanga Region and Mara Region (trunk road T36) branches of inside the town.
