= Sirari =

Ward in Tarime, Mara, Tanzania

Sirari Kata ya Sirari
- Ward
- Location within Tanzania Location within Africa
- Coordinates: 01°13′28″S 034°26′18″E
- Country: Tanzania
- Region: Mara Region
- District: Tarime District
- Ward: Sirari

Population (2016)
  - Total: 17,564
- Time zone: UTC+3 (EAT)
- Postcode: 31409
- UFI: -2573652

Sirari is a town and ward in Tarime District, Mara Region of northern Tanzania, East Africa. In 2016 the Tanzania National Bureau of Statistics report there were 17,564 people in the ward, from 15,917 in 2012.

== Villages / neighborhoods ==
The ward has 4 villages and 15 hamlets.

- Sokoni
  - Majengo mapya
  - Mlimani
  - Nyairoma
  - Sokoni
- Buriba
  - Kenanso
  - Nyasoko
  - Nyatiti
  - Sirari
- Mpakani
  - Bondeni
  - Forodhani
  - Kemwita Wahende
  - Nyamorege
- Kanisani
  - Gwitanka
  - Kanisani
  - Nyatoraha
