= Simiyu Region =

Region of Tanzania

Simiyu Region Mkoa wa Simiyu (Swahili)
- Region
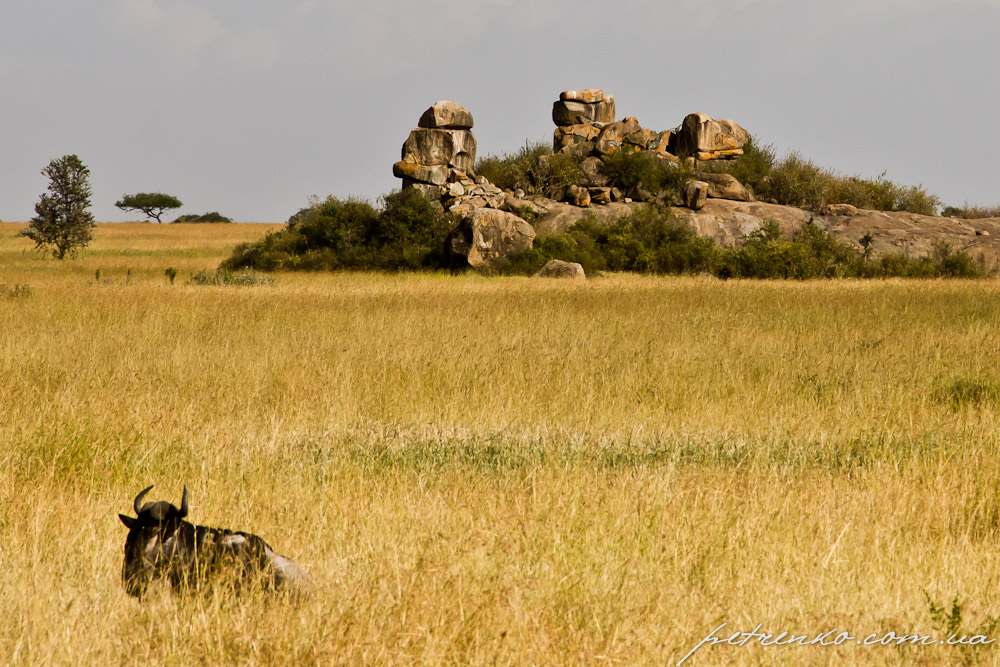
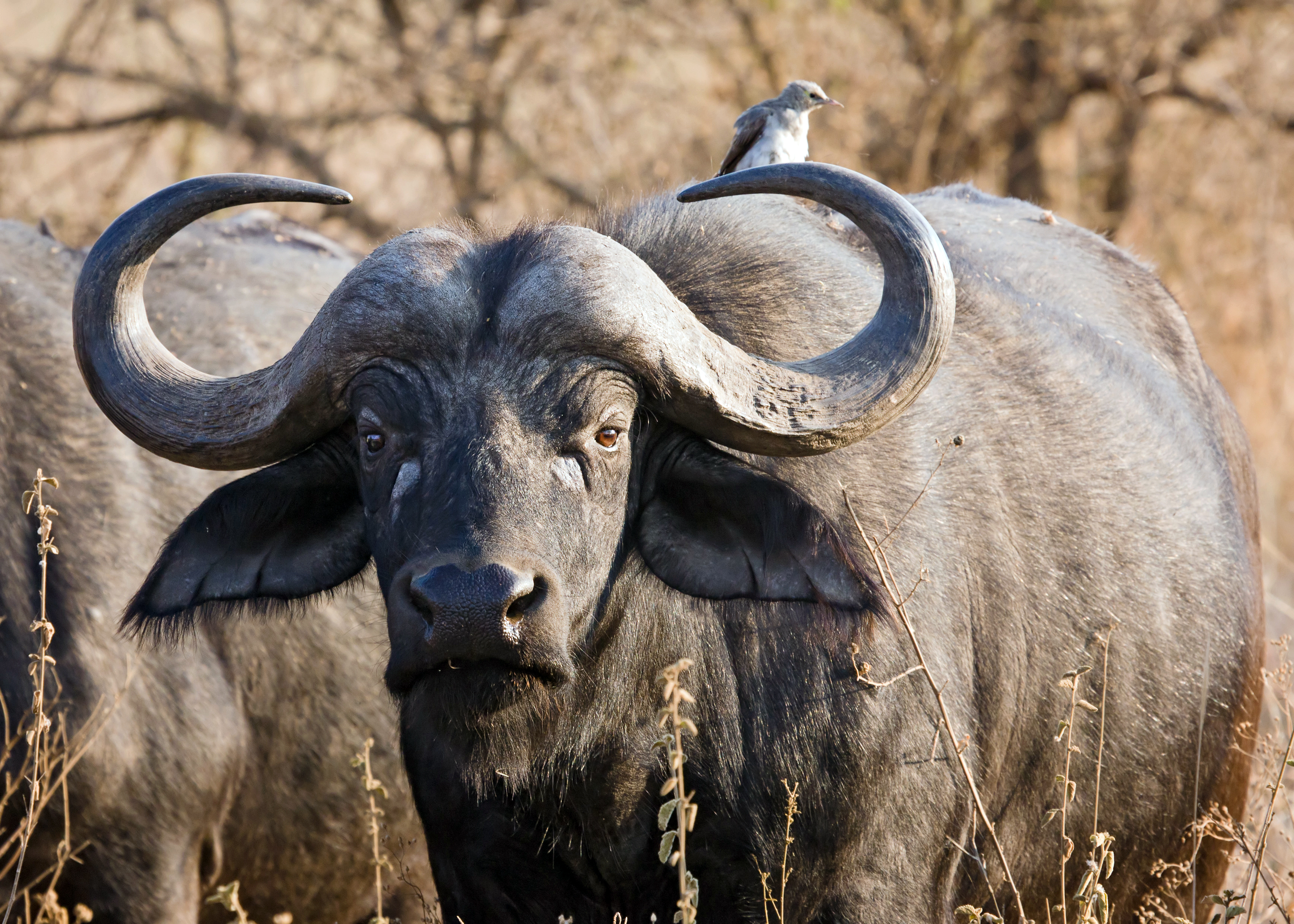
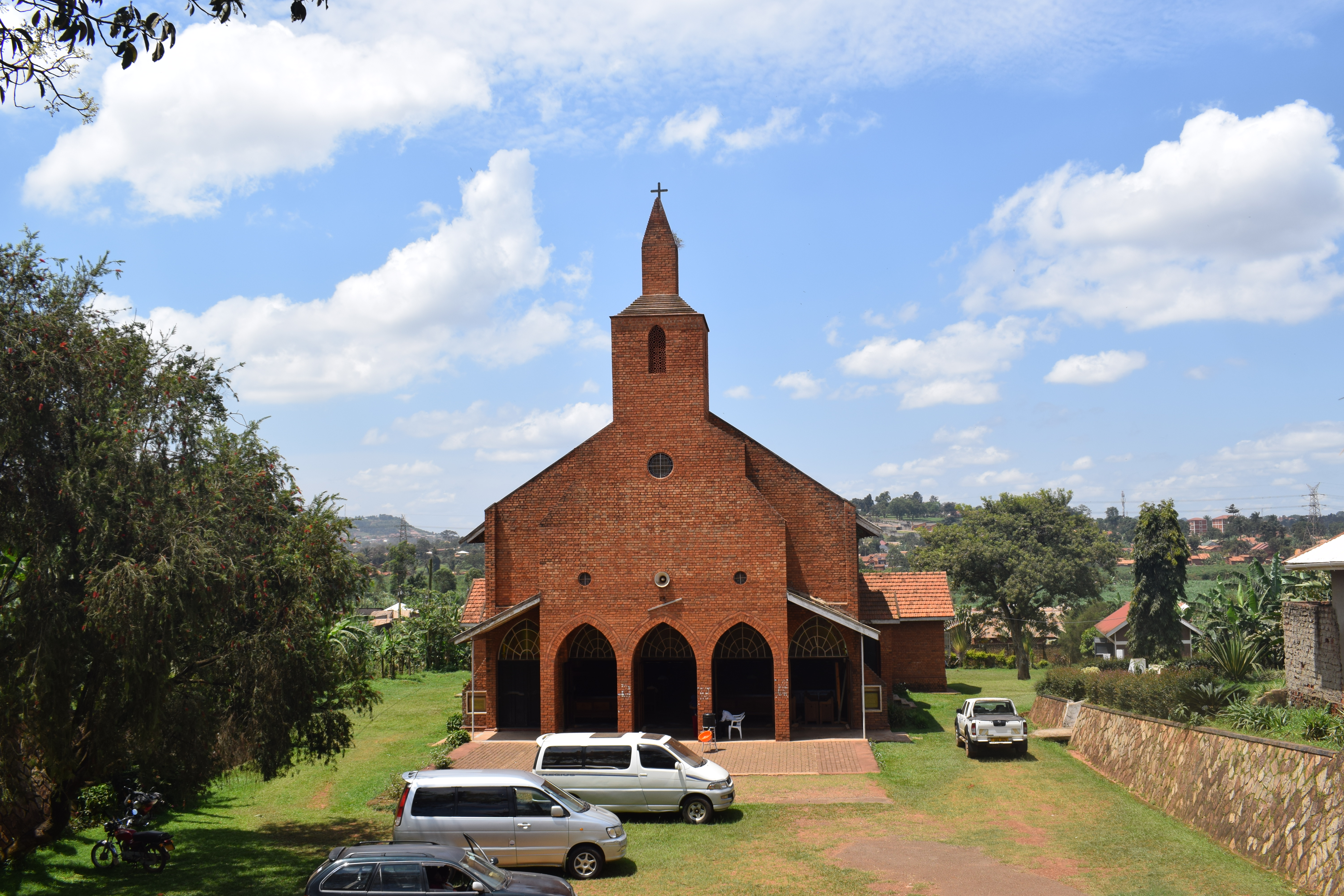
- From top to bottom: Serengeti Landscape in Bariadi District, Buffalo in Serengeti National Park & Busega Anglican Church in Busega District
- Nickname: The cotton region
- Location in Tanzania
- Coordinates: 3°40′51.6″S 33°25′37.56″E
- Country: Tanzania
- Zone: Lake
- Region: 2012
- Capital: Bariadi
- Districts: List: Bariadi District; Bariadi Town; Busega District; Itilima District; Maswa District; Meatu District

Government
  - Regional Commissioner: Dr. Yahaya Nawanda (CCM)

Area
  - Total: 25,212 km^{2} (9,734 sq mi)
  - Rank: 17th of 31
- Highest elevation (Naabi Hill): 1,787 m (5,863 ft)

Population (2022)
  - Total: 2,140,497
  - Rank: 14th of 31
  - Density: 84.900/km^{2} (219.89/sq mi)
- Demonym: Simiyi

Ethnic groups
  - Settler: Swahili
  - Native: Sukuma, Nyiramba, Nyaturu, and Hadzabe (Tindiga)
- Time zone: UTC+3 (EAT)
- Postal code: 39xxx
- Area code: 028
- ISO 3166 code: TZ-30
- HDI (2021): 0.508 low · 20th of 25
- Website: Official website
- Symbols of Tanzania
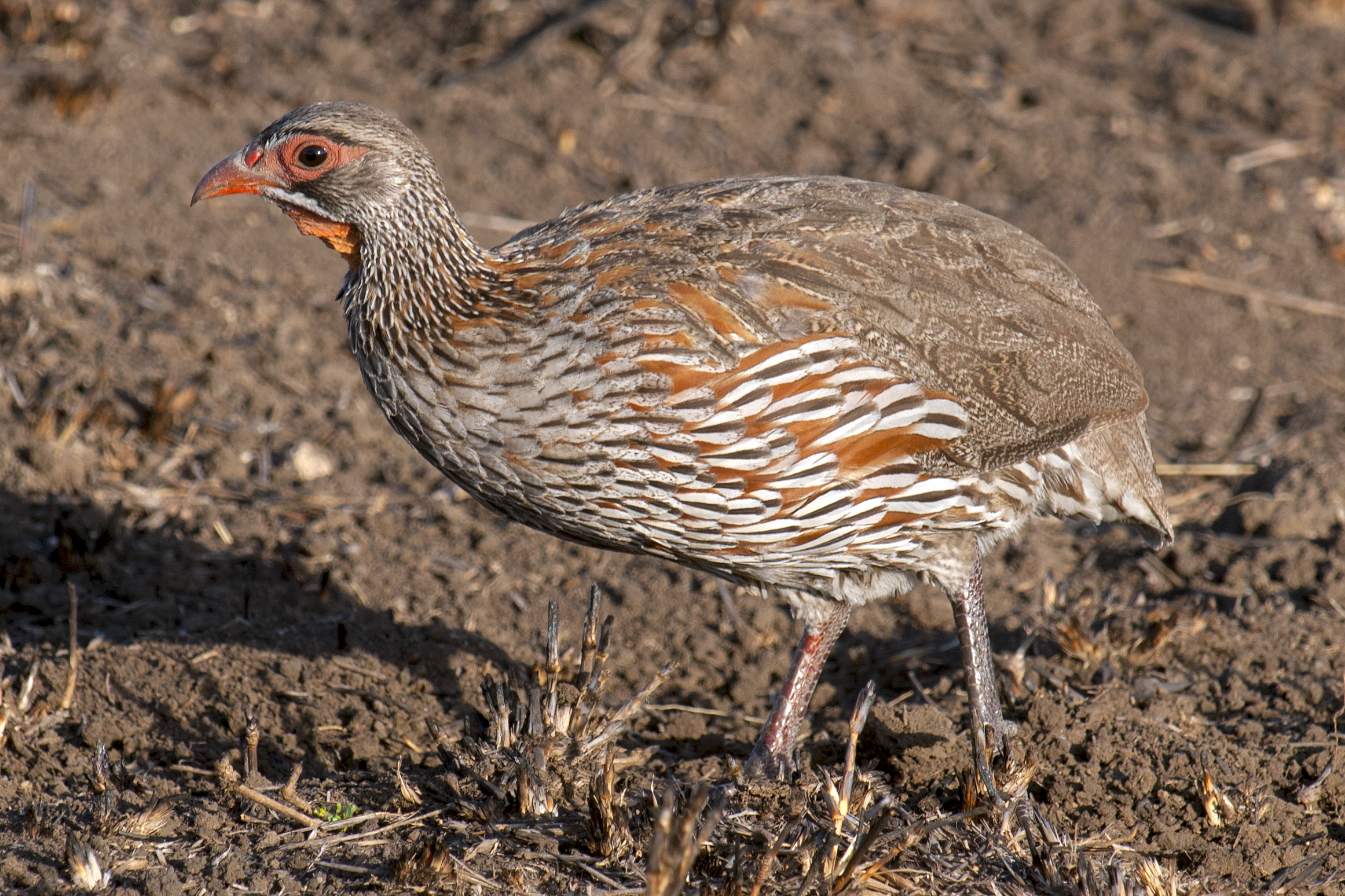
- Bird: Grey-breasted spurfowl

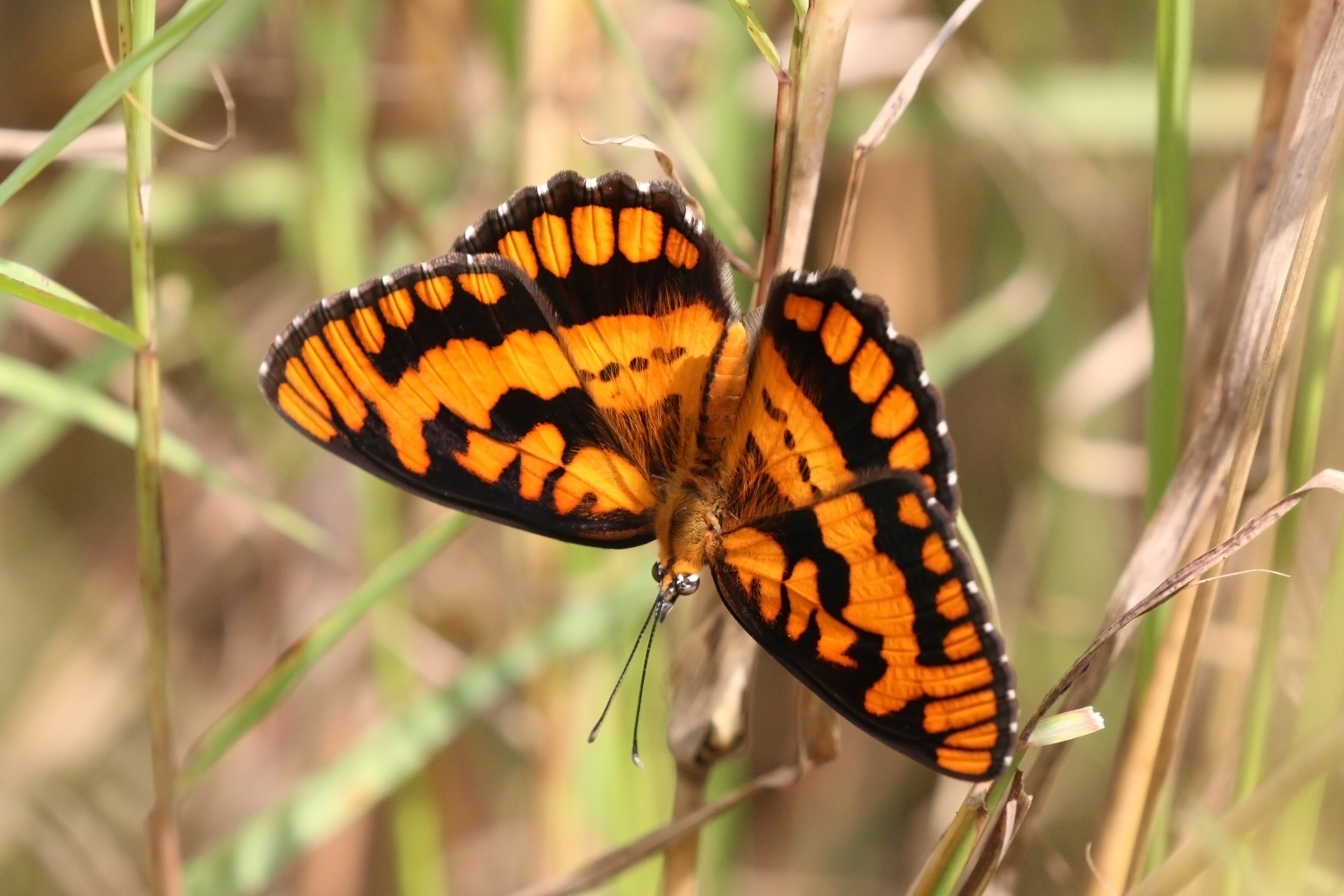
- Butterfly: Common joker

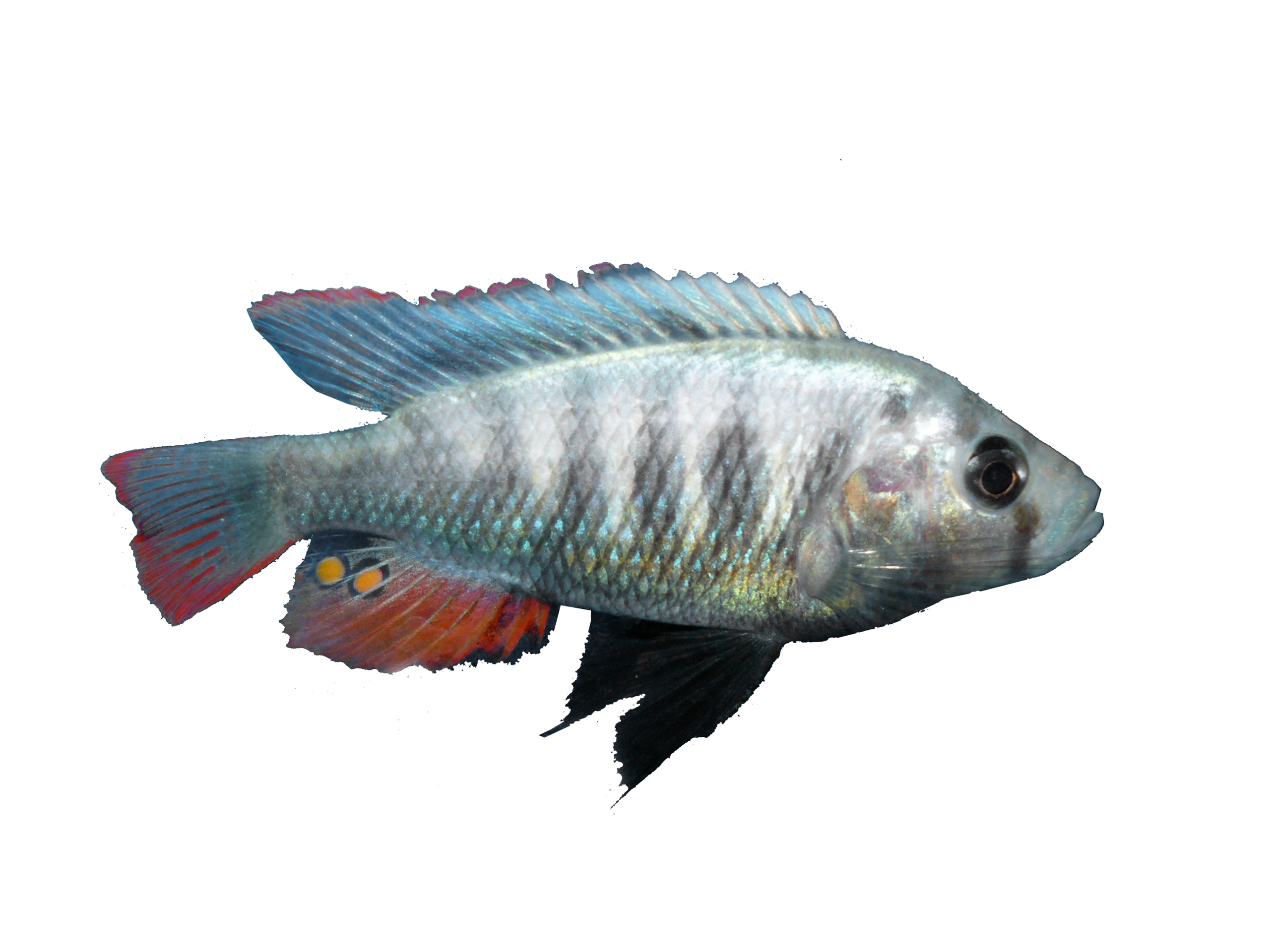
- Fish: Pundamilia pundamilia
- Mammal: Thompson's Gazelle
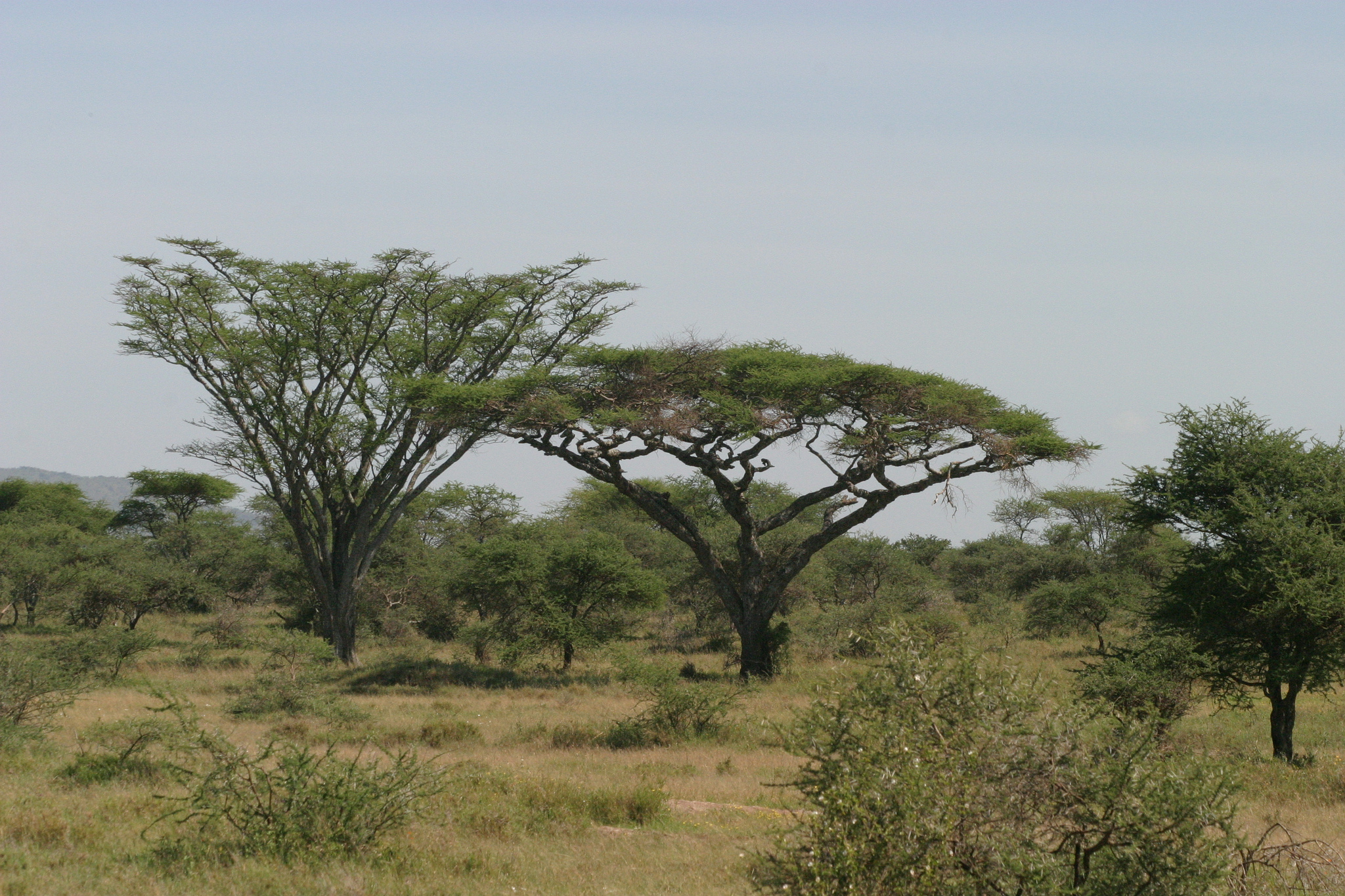
- Tree: Acacia abyssinica

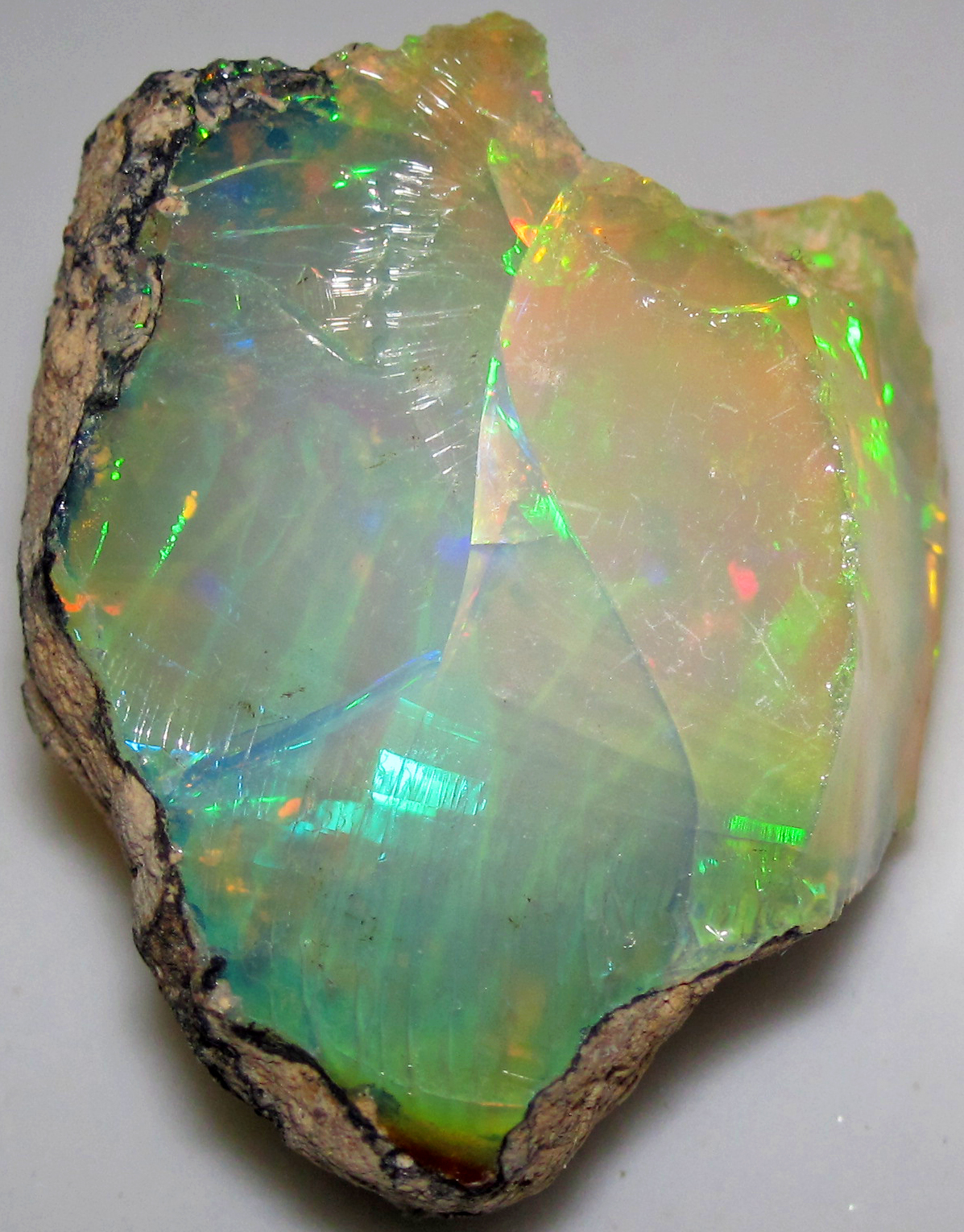
- Mineral: Opal

Simiyu Region (Swahili: Mkoa wa Simiyu) is one of Tanzania's 31 administrative regions. The region covers a land area of 25,212 km^{2} (9,734 sq mi). The region is comparable in size to the combined land area of the nation state of North Macedonia. The region is bordered to the north by the Lake Victoria and Mara Region, to the south by the Shinyanga Region and Singida Region. Mwanza Region borders the region to the west, and Arusha Region to the east. The region is home to the Serengeti National Park, a UNESCO World Heritage Site, shared with Mara Region. The regional capital is the town of Bariadi. According to the 2022 national census, the region had a population of 2,140,497.

== History ==
Simiyu Region is named after the Simiyu River. The region was created in March 2012 from part of Shinyanga Region.

== Geography ==
The topography of the area is characterized by low, sparse vegetation and, in some areas, Miombo woodland. It is also flat with gentle undulations. With areas of red loamy and sandy soil, heavy black soils (Mbuga) make up the majority of the regional soils.

There are three agro-ecological zones in the region. Zone One includes Bariadi District, which has an undulating landscape dominated by clay soil and top soils with a light texture. Rainfall amounts range between 700 and 900 mm. Crop cultivation, with a focus on maize, sorghum, cotton, and cassava, as well as livestock rearing, are the main economic activities.

The Meatu District is covered by zone two, which has gently sloping topography and fertile clay loamy soils towards the east. Significant soil erosion occurs in the area, which reduces agricultural production. The main economic activities are crop farming and animal husbandry, and the average annual rainfall is less than 700 mm with an irregular tendency. Sorghum, cotton, and maize are among the crops farmed in this region.

The third zone, which includes the Maswa District, has ridged and undulating topography. Sukuma land soil catena, often referred to as "Mbuga," is a black clay loamy soil that is suited for growing paddy. Other crops farmed in this area include maize, sorghum, and cotton. Between 700mm and 800mm of unpredictable rains fall on the area each year. The community is renowned for its livestock rearing as well.

=== Drainage basins ===
There are two drainage systems in the Region. The first is in the region's eastern portion and empties into Lake Eyasi, which has no outlet, after draining through the Sibit River to an internal drainage basin. The second is in the western portion of the Region and discharges its water into Lake Victoria via the Simiyu River.

=== Climate ===
Simiyu Region receives mild temperatures yearly averaging between 18 °C and 31 °C. However, the area also has monomodal rainfall, which often begins in October and lasts until May. There are two peaks during the rainy season. The longest season is the second rainy season, which spans from mid-February to mid-May. The first one begins in October and finishes in December. While the average amount of rainfall ranges from 600 to 900 mm, the pattern of precipitation is typically uneven and unpredictable.

== Economy ==
In terms of money, the region's GDP in 2010 was estimated to be TZS 1,959,401 million, or around 6.07 percent of the national GDP. The Region also ranks among the medium income earners in the nation with a per capital income of TZS 510,023.

=== Infrastructure and energy ===
Malampaka Railway Station is the only railroad station in Simiyu Region where cargo can be shipped to Mwanza and Dar es Salaam. The total length of roads in the region is 4,034.6 kilometers. Even though Lake Victoria borders the region's northern portion, it lacks access to marine transportation, with Mwanza serving as a hub for marine and air transportation.

The National Grid is the source of the region's electricity supply. Electricity is available in every Simiyu District. Simiyu Region is connected with TTCL - Landline services as well as the mobile phone network (Airtel, Vodacom, Zantel, and TTCL). Communication services are gradually expanding to include the entire Region. To facilitate communication, optical fiber is also used to connect the Region. Although the Simiyu Region only has one radio station, Sibuka FM, TBC, ITV, and RFA can all be reached there. Town inhabitants can also access TV stations via satellite dishes.

=== Agriculture ===
Simiyu Region's economy and way of life have remained mostly based on agriculture. Roughly 80% of the Region's active population is employed in this industry, which makes up about 75% of the economy of the region. Cotton, peanuts, and sunflower are the three main cash crops farmed. While maize, sorghum, paddy, sweet potatoes, millet, and cassava are the primary food crops. Simiyu Region has a total size of 23,807,700 hectares, or 23,807.7 square kilometers. 11,479,100 hectares are arable ground that is ideal for farming. 60% of the arable land is cultivated, or 6,942,378 hectares total. A total of 61,542 hectares of regional land are suitable for irrigation, however only 14,766 hectares (23.9%) of that land is actually being used. Paddy, maize, and vegetables are typically grown on this irrigation-fed land.

=== Livestock and dairy ===
The region's second-largest economic activity is livestock raising. There are 1,412,911 cattle, 674,402 goats, 254,746 sheep, 1,501,146 chickens, and 1,723 pigs in the Simiyu Region. After selling sheep, goats, and beef cattle over a three-year period (2009–2012), a total of TZS.96,634,930,090/- was made. A total of 21,145,384 liters of milk were produced and sold between 2009 and 2011, with a value of Tshs.17,186,987,000.

=== Forestry ===
Forest covers 365.15 km^{2}, or 365,125.9 ha, of regional land. Game control areas, game reserves, national parks, open spaces, Wildlife Management Areas (WMAs), and forest reservations held by District Council and villages are among these forests. In the Simiyu region, efforts have been made to plant trees to improve the amount of vegetation cover; 8,388,253 tree seedlings were raised during the 2011–12 fiscal year.

=== Fisheries ===
Simiyu has a coastline and territorial waters on Lake Victoria. The Busega District on the shores of Lake Victoria, Lake Kitangiri in Meatu District, rivers, and dam reservoirs are the primary fishing locations in the Simiyu Region. Fishing in the rest of the region is only done for home use, with the exception of the Victoria Lake shoreline in the Busega District. To name a few of the common freshwater fish, there is Nile perch, tilapia, and sardine. At Zanzui Dam in Maswa District, there are efforts made to increase fish productivity by breeding fingerlings, mostly for Tilapia species. For home fish farming, the produced fingerlings are stocked into dam reservoirs and ponds.

== Industry ==
Vegetable oil mills and ginneries make up the big and medium-sized industries, while the small-scale industries are dominated by the food processing, tailoring, carpentry, welding, and garage sectors.

== Mining ==
Salt is found in Lukole hamlet in Meatu District while nickel has been found in Dutwa in the Bariadi District. Locally, salt is mined using traditional equipment, while nickel extraction is still in its beginnings.

== Tourism ==
Simiyu region is home to Maswa Game Reserve and has a total area of 4,210 square kilometers and is located in the Bariadi District near the Serengeti National Park's borders. Makao Wildlife Management Area has a total area of 1,330 square kilometers and is located in the Meatu District. Numerous animals inhabit these reserves, such as hippos, lion, zebras, buffalo, Wild Dogs, bushbuck, impala, giraffes, and baboons.

== Population ==
Sukuma (nyantuzu), Nyiramba, Nyaturu, and Hadzabe (Tindiga), are the major indigenous ethnic groupings. The Sukuma may be found practically everywhere, whereas the Nyaturu and Nyiramba are primarily found in the Maswa and Meatu Districts and the Hadzabe (Tindiga) and Nyaturu in the Meatu District, respectively. According to the 2012 national census, the region had a population of 1,584,157. For 2002–2012, the region's 1.8 percent average annual population growth rate was the twenty-third-highest in the country. It was also the fifteenth-most-densely-populated region with 63 people per square kilometer.

Census	Population
2002	1,317,879
2012	1,584,157
2022	2,140,497

== Administrative divisions ==
=== Districts ===
Simiyu Region is divided into five districts and one town council, each administered by a council:

Districts of Simiyu Region
Map with main roads in green	District	Population (2022 census)
	Bariadi District	383,385
	Bariadi Town Council	260,927
	Busega District	282,167
	Itilima District	419,213
	Maswa District	427,864
	Meatu District	366,941
	Total	2,140,497

== List of regional commissioners ==
List of regional commissioners (RC)
Year	Full name	Note
2012	Paschal Kulwa Mabiti	The first RC
2016	Erasto J. Mbwilo	The Second RC
2021	Anthony Mtaka	Predecessor
2021	David Kafulila	Predecessor
2022	Yahaya Esmail Nawanda	To date

== Health and education ==
=== Health ===
Simiyu Region is home to three district hospitals, located in Maswa, Meatu, and Bariadi, as well as one designated hospital that is run by a religious institution. There is neither a regional hospital nor a referral hospital. There are 158 dispensaries and 14 health centers together.

=== Education ===
There are 423 primary schools registered in the region, serving 281,177 students, of which 136,322 are boys and 144,855 are girls. A total of 25,078 students passed standard VII and took their final exam in 2012; 11,480 of those students were male and 13,598 were female. Additionally, there are 127 secondary schools in the Simiyu Region, serving a total of 37,474 students. There are four government vocational training centers in the region, and a total of 217 students attend them, 124 of whom are male and 93 female.

== Notable people ==
- Venance Salvatory Mabeyo, former chief of the Tanzanian Defence Forces
- Silas Mayunga, Former Lieutenant General of Tanzania Defence Forces
- Andrew Chenge, Former Attorney General of United Republic of Tanzania
