= Nanyamba Town Council =

District in Mtwara Region of Tanzania

Nanyamba Halmashauri ya Mji Nanyamba (Swahili)
- District
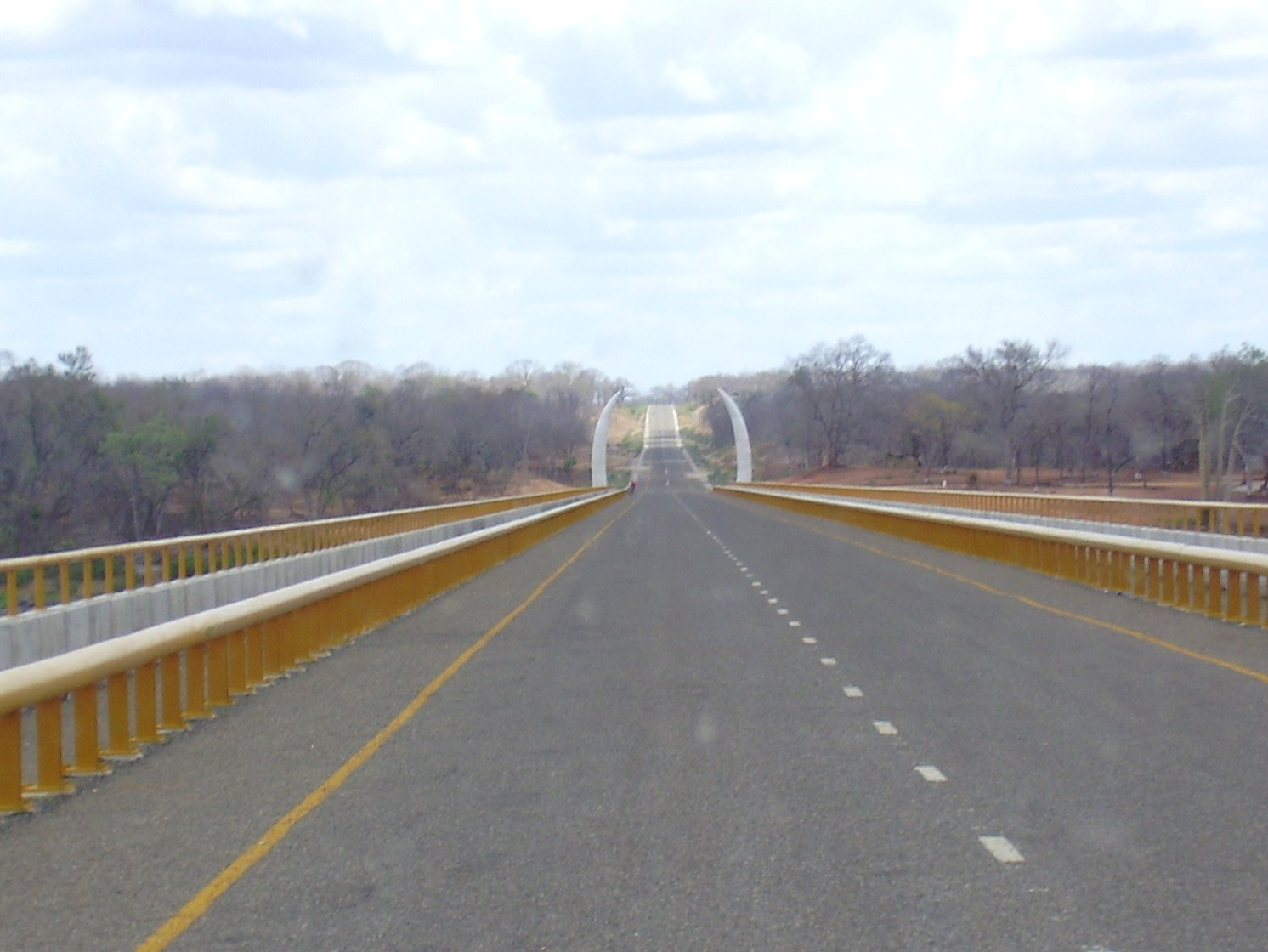
- Unity Bridge between Tanzania and Mozambique

- Nanyamba Town in Mtwara Region of Tanzania
- Coordinates: 10.6899387°S 39.8010206°E
- Country: Tanzania
- Region: Mtwara Region
- District: Nanyamba
- Established: 2016
- Headquarters: Nanyamba Town

Government
  - Type: Council
  - Chairman: Kapende Jamali Abdalah
  - Director: Thomas Edwin Mwalilafu

Area
  - Total: 1,438 km^{2} (555 sq mi)
- Elevation: 250 m (820 ft)

Population (2016)
  - Total: 107,112
  - Density: 74.49/km^{2} (192.9/sq mi)
- Time zone: EAT
- Postcode: 63213
- Area code: 023
- Website: District Website

Nanyamba Town, is a district established in 2016 of the Mtwara Region in the southern coastal Tanzania. Nanyamba is in the eastern portion of the Mtwara Region, near the coast.

== Geography ==
Nanyamba is located south of Lindi Region, west of Mtwara Rural District, north of the nation of Mozambique across the Ruvuma River, and east of the Tandahimba District. The district covers an area of 1,438 square kilometres (555 sq mi) that is a plateau of an elevation of 280 m (920 ft) to 305 m (1,001 ft).

The two primary geographical areas are the Makonde Plateau and Ruvuma Valley. Like most of Mtwara the plateau makes up most of the council, with Ruvuma Valley being the river and border with Mozambique.

=== Climate ===
The temperature ranges between 32 °C (90 °F) and 23 °C (73 °F) over two seasons. There is a dry season between May and November and a wet season between December and April. The average rainfall is 800 mm (31 in) to 900 mm (35 in).

=== Administrative areas ===
In 2022 the district administers 3 divisions, 17 wards, 87 villages, 9 suburbs, and 323 hamlets.

Wards (2016 population)

- Chawi (6,777)
- Dinyecha (5,143)
- Hinju (4,103)
- Kiromba (4,862)
- Kitaya (8,713)
- Kiyanga (5,167)
- Namtumbuka (3,257)
- Nanyamba (8,444)
- Njengwa (6,165)

- Nitekela (7,356)
- Nyundo (2,502)
- Mbembaleo (6,248)
- Mnima (10,518)
- Milangominne (6,819)
- Mnongodi (5,070)
- Mtimbwilimbwi (8,397)
- Mtiniko (7,572)

== Demographics ==
The 2016 population of Nanyamba was projected at 107,112, in 27,905 households. The district has an annual population growth rate of 1.4%. The Wamakonde make up most of the population, with others tribes in the district being Wamakua, Wayao, and Wamwera. Most of the people engage in keeping livestock and small scale farming.

== Economy ==
Agriculture is the primary economy of Nanayamba with 92 per cent of Wananyamba farming or raising livestock. Most current investment is expanding irrigation, particularly from the Ruvuma River. Additionally fisheries is a growing sector, with hatchery investments in Kiromba, Mnongodi, Kitaya and Chawi wards.

== Governance ==
Nanyamba is one of the three districts governed as town councils in the Mtwara Region with Masasi Town, and Newala Town. The other 6 districts being the city council of Mtwara City, and the 5 rural district councils of Masasi District, Mtwara District, Nanyumbu District, Newala District, and Tandahimba District.

The current chairman of the town council is Kapende Jamali Abdalah, with Thomas Edwin Mwalilafu acting as the town director.

== Infrastructure ==
=== Roads ===
Nanyamba has a road system of 523.74 km (325.44 mi), of which 383.37 km (238.22 mi) are collector roads, 22.03 km (13.69 mi) feeder roads, and 118.34 km (73.53 mi) community roads. There is a proposed plan, with land set aside, for a new bus terminal.

Currently the regional road that from Mtwara to Masasi, through Nanyamba, is being upgraded to bitumen with some already complete. The remaining 160 km (99 mi) section, and Mwiti Bridge are still in preparation and with funding approval already received.

=== Air ===
The district will be served by the new Mtwara International Airport that is less than one hour from Nanyamba Town, just outside Mtwara City. The airport is currently 92 per cent complete.

=== Communications ===
The district has wide spread cellular coverage, however some areas there can be difficulties. Landlines, postal services and over the air media is available throughout the district.

== Education ==
The council has 65 primary schools with 25,579 students, and 10 secondary schools with 4018 students. The district has 227 of the required 613 classrooms, 107 of the 557 required teachers houses, 401 of the required 680 teachers, and 1 book per 5 students.

== Health Care ==
The district does not have any hospitals, but has one health center and 25 dispensaries. The district is understaffed with 289 of required 410 medical staff.
