= Mtwara–Mikindani District =

District of Mtwara Region, Tanzania

Coordinates: 10°16′28″S 40°10′58″E

Mtwara-Mikindani
- District
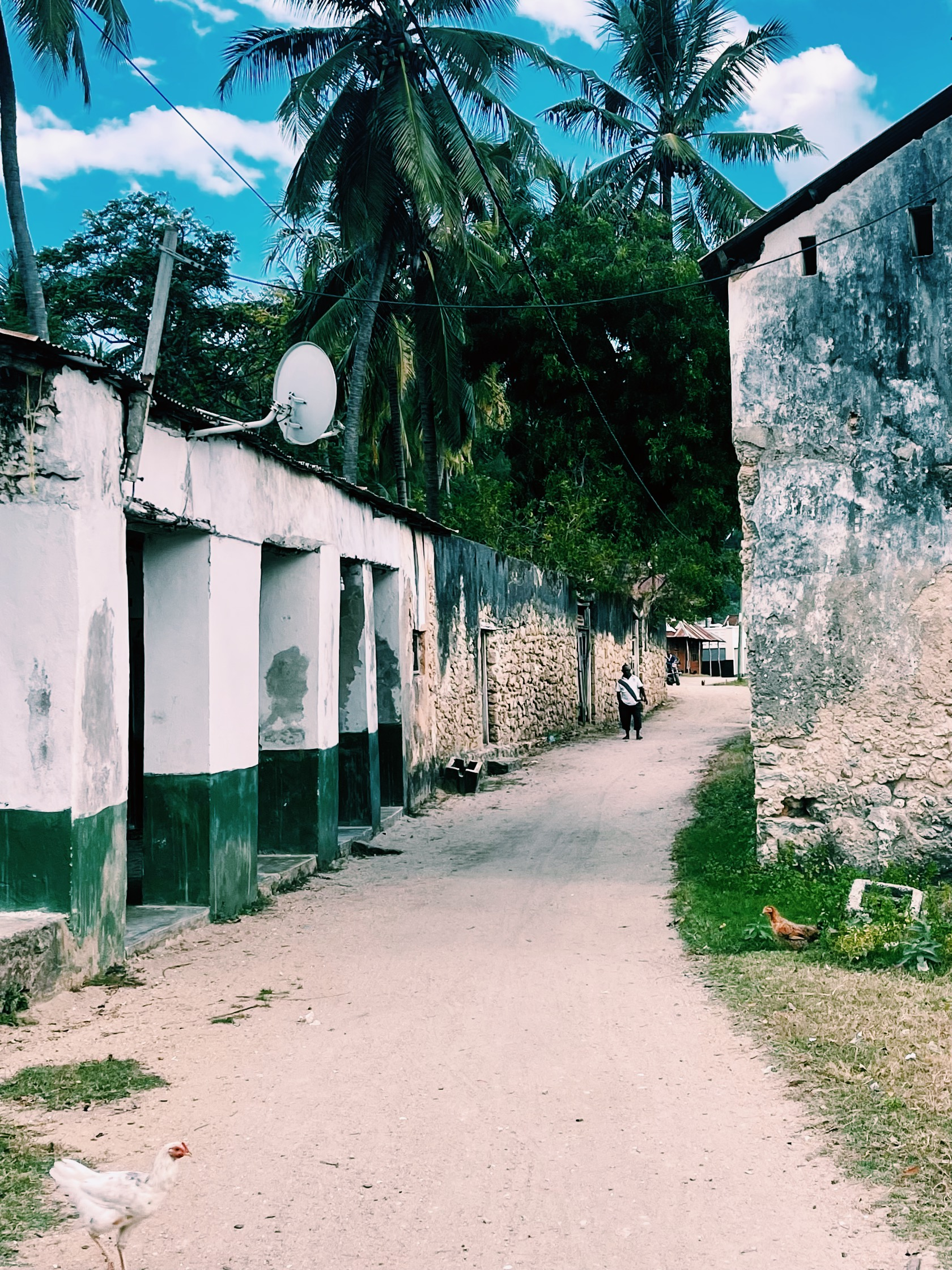
- Street Scene in Magengeni ward, Mikindani
- Nickname: "Mtwara's soul"
- Mtwara Mikindani in Mtwara Region
- Country: Tanzania
- Region: Mtwara Region
- District: Mtwara-Mikindani District
- Capital: Mtwara

Area
  - Total: 170 km^{2} (66 sq mi)
- Elevation: 0 m (0 ft)
- Highest elevation: 111 m (364 ft)

Population (2016)
  - Total: 113,732
  - Density: 670/km^{2} (1,700/sq mi)
- Demonym: Mtwara-Mikindanian
- Time zone: EAT
- Tanzanian Postal Code: 631**
- Area code: 023
- Website: District Website

Mtwara Mikindani Municipal District Council is one of eight regional councils of the Mtwara Region in Tanzania. It is bordered to the north by the Lindi Region, to the east by the Indian Ocean and to the south and west by the Mtwara District. In 2016, the municipality has a total population of 113,732 .

== Geography ==
The district covers an area of 170 km^{2} (66 sq mi), and has an average elevation of 106 m (348 ft) from sea level to 130 m (430 ft) on the first edge of the Makonde Plateau at the site of the new airport.The district is home to the following islands; Mongo Island and Mwanahawaja Island both in the Mnazi-bay Ruvuma Marine Park

=== Wards ===
The Mtwara Urban District is administratively its divided into 2 divisions - Mtwara Urban and Mikindani Division - and has 15 wards, 185 neighborhoods, 6 villages and 27 hamlets. Mtwara division is primarily the city and is urban while Mikindani is a small historic colonial town.

Mtwara Division (Population 2016)

- Chikongola (6,574)
- Chuno (9,330)
- Likombe (7,907)
- Majengo (1,890)
- Naliendele (7,603)

- Rahaleo (5,469)
- Railway (2,929)
- Shangani (13,543)
- Ufukoni (7,485)
- Vigaeni (3,857)

Mikindani Division (Population 2016)

- Mitengo (1,680)
- Mtonya (2,008)
- Magengeni (18,781)
- Kisungure (1,179)
- Jangwani (4,426)

== Demographics ==
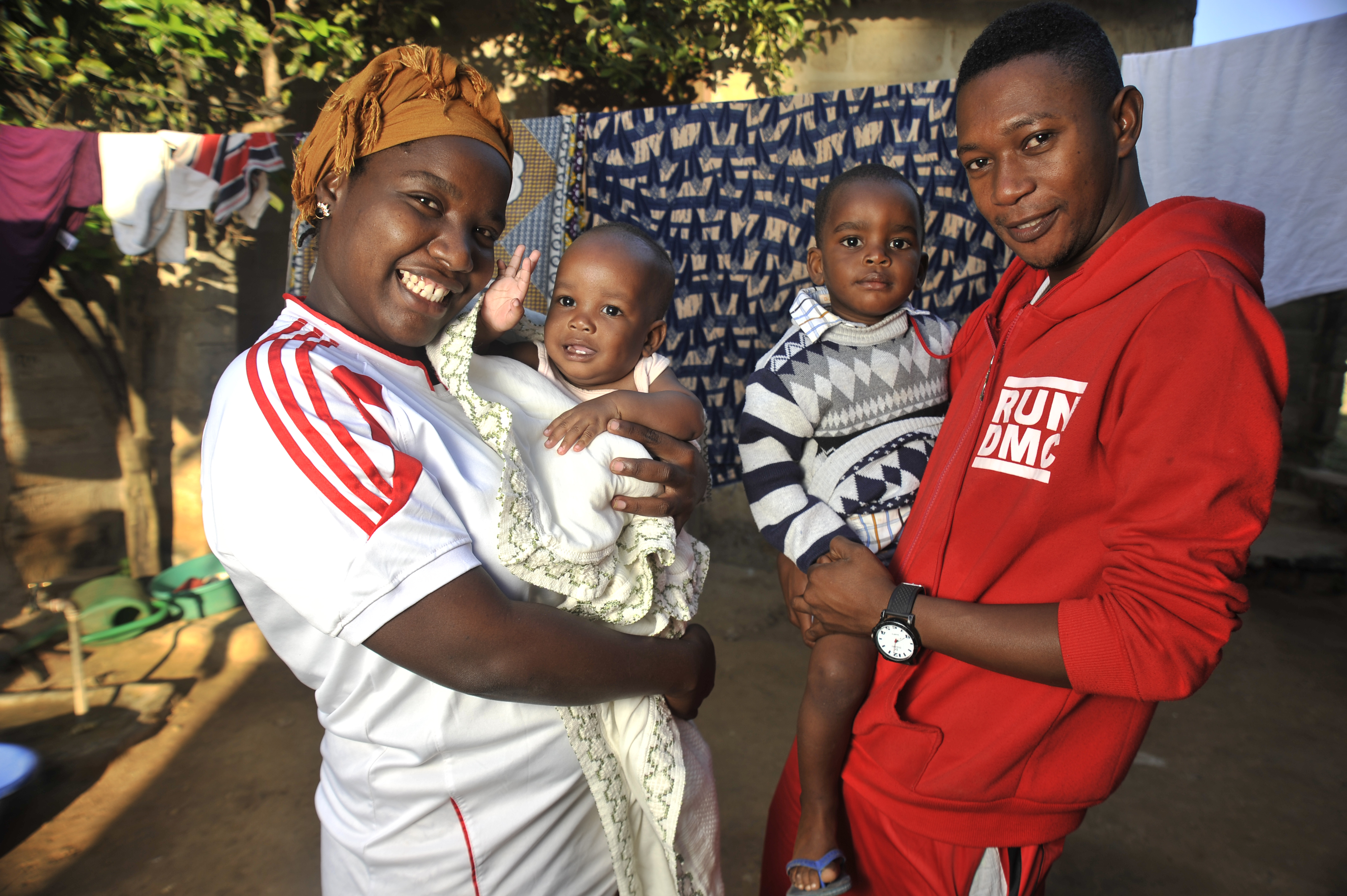
Family outside their house in Mtwara, Tanzania.

In 2016 the population was 113,732 from 108,299 in 2012. The people of Mtwara Mikindani are primarily Wamakonde at around 75%, with also Wamwera, Wayao, and Wamakua. Because of the discovery of significant oil and gas in the area, many from other areas of Tanzania are moving to the city creating making it much more diverse today.

== Governance ==
Mtwara Mikindani is the only municipal council of the Mtwara Region, with the three town councils of Masasi Town, Nanyamba Town and Newala Town. The other 5 being the rural district councils of Masasi District, Mtwara District, Nanyumbu District, Newala District, and Tandahimba District.

The current mayor is Shadida Ally Ndile, and cirrent city director is Emmanuel H. Mwaigobeko.

== Infrastructure ==
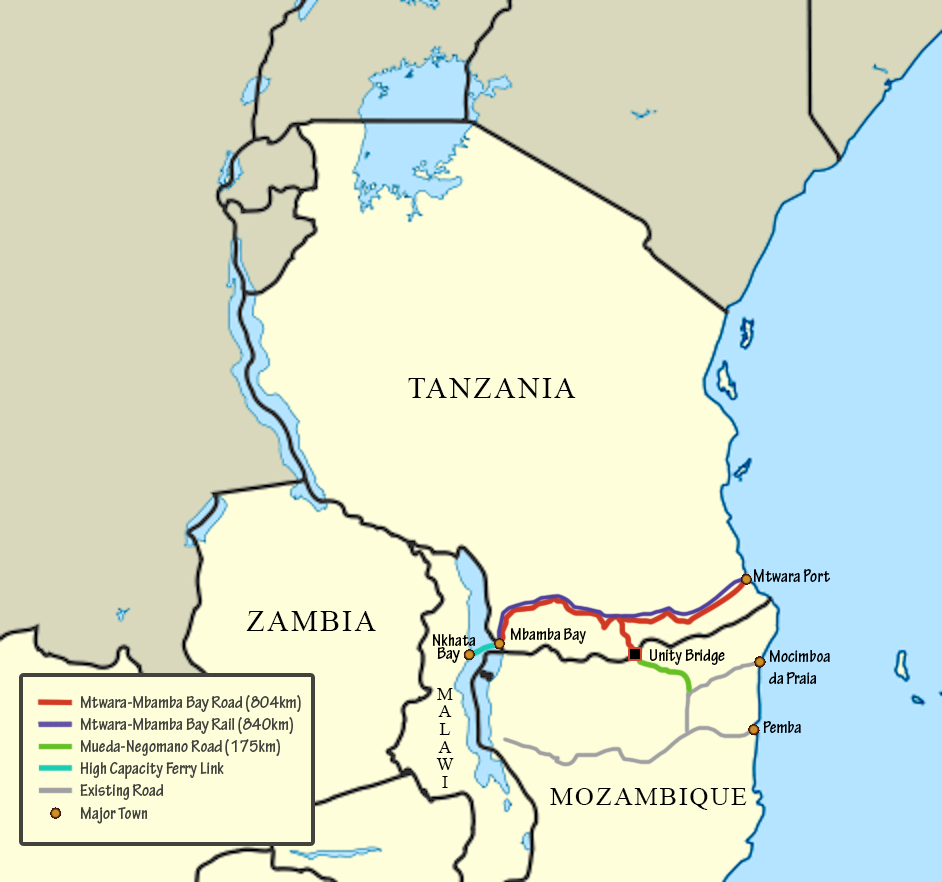
Map of Mtwara Development Corridor being constructed.

Currently the Mtwara Development Corridor is being built to connect the Mtwara Port, with Malawi, Mozambique, and Zambia, through the Mtwara Region.

=== Roads ===
Nanyamba has a road system of 334.96 km (208.13 mi), of which 103.72 km (64.45 mi) are collector roads, and 241.52 km (150.07 mi) are feeder roads.

=== Air ===
The district will be served by the new Mtwara International Airport. The airport is currently 92 per cent complete.

=== Communications ===
The entire district has cell coverage and access to landlines, postage, internet, and over the air media of radio and television. The postal codes are designated after 631xx
