= Chikongola =

Ward in Mtwara-Mikindani District, Mtwara Region

Chikongola Kata ya Chikongola (Swahili)
- Ward
- Kata ya Chikongola, Wilaya ya Mtwara-Mikindani
- Location within Tanzania
- Country: Tanzania
- Region: Mtwara Region
- District: Mtwara-Mikindani District

Area
  - Total: 2.2 km^{2} (0.85 sq mi)
- Elevation: 14 m (46 ft)

Population (2012)
  - Total: 14,787
  - Density: 6,700/km^{2} (17,000/sq mi)
- Tanzanian Postal Code: 63105

Chikongola is an administrative ward in Mtwara-Mikindani District of Mtwara Region in Tanzania. The ward covers an area of 2.2 km^{2} (0.85 sq mi), and has an average elevation of 14 m (46 ft). According to the 2012 census, the ward has a total population of 14,787.
