= Likombe =

Ward in Mtwara-Mikindani District, Mtwara Region

Likombe Kata ya Likombe (Swahili)
- Ward
- Kata ya Likombe, Wilaya ya Mtwara-Mikindani
- Location within Tanzania
- Country: Tanzania
- Region: Mtwara Region
- District: Mtwara-Mikindani District

Area
  - Total: 40 km^{2} (15 sq mi)
- Elevation: 17 m (56 ft)

Population (2012)
  - Total: 13,302
  - Density: 330/km^{2} (860/sq mi)
- Tanzanian Postal Code: 63102

Likombe is an administrative ward in Mtwara-Mikindani District of Mtwara Region in Tanzania. The ward covers an area of 40 km^{2} (15 sq mi), and has an average elevation of 17 m (56 ft). According to the 2012 census, the ward has a total population of 13,302.
