= Rahaleo =

Ward in Mtwara-Mikindani District, Mtwara Region

Rahaleo Kata ya Rahaleo (Swahili)
- Ward
- Kata ya Rahaleo, Wilaya ya Mtwara-Mikindani
- Location within Tanzania
- Country: Tanzania
- Region: Mtwara Region
- District: Mtwara-Mikindani District

Area
  - Total: 1.4 km^{2} (0.54 sq mi)
- Elevation: 8 m (26 ft)

Population (2012)
  - Total: 5,208
  - Density: 3,700/km^{2} (9,600/sq mi)
- Tanzanian Postal Code: 63114

Rahaleo is an administrative ward in Mtwara-Mikindani District of Mtwara Region in Tanzania. The ward covers an area of 1.4 km^{2} (0.54 sq mi), and has an average elevation of 8 m (26 ft). According to the 2012 census, the ward has a total population of 5,208.
