= Jangwani, Mtwara-Mikindani =

Ward in Mtwara-Mikindani District, Mtwara Region

Jangwani Kata ya Jangwani (Swahili)
- Ward
- Kata ya Jangwani, Wilaya ya Mtwara-Mikindani
- Location within Tanzania
- Country: Tanzania
- Region: Mtwara Region
- District: Mtwara-Mikindani District

Area
  - Total: 21.7 km^{2} (8.4 sq mi)
- Elevation: 55 m (180 ft)

Population (2012)
  - Total: 4,215
  - Density: 194/km^{2} (503/sq mi)
- Tanzanian Postal Code: 63113

Jangwani is an administrative ward in Mtwara-Mikindani District of Mtwara Region in Tanzania. The ward covers an area of 21.7 km^{2} (8.4 sq mi), and has an average elevation of 55 m (180 ft). According to the 2012 census, the ward has a total population of 4,215.
