= Chuno, Mtwara-Mikindani =

Ward in Mtwara Region, Tanzania

Chuno Kata ya Chuno (Swahili)
- Ward
- Kata ya Chuno, Wilaya ya Mtwara-Mikindani
- Location within Tanzania
- Country: Tanzania
- Region: Mtwara Region
- District: Mtwara-Mikindani District

Area
  - Total: 3.3 km^{2} (1.3 sq mi)
- Elevation: 4 m (13 ft)

Population (2012)
  - Total: 8,884
  - Density: 2,700/km^{2} (7,000/sq mi)
- Tanzanian Postal Code: 63107

Chuno is an administrative ward in Mtwara-Mikindani District of Mtwara Region in Tanzania. The ward covers an area of 3.3 km^{2} (1.3 sq mi), and has an average elevation of 4 m (13 ft). According to the 2012 census, the ward has a total population of 8,884.
