= Jida, Masasi Town =

Ward in Masasi Town District Council, Mtwara Region

Jida Kata ya Jida (Swahili)
- Ward
- Kata ya Jida, Wilaya na Halmashauri ya Masasi Mjini
- Location within Tanzania
- Country: Tanzania
- Region: Mtwara Region
- District: Masasi Town Council

Area
  - Total: 5 km^{2} (1.9 sq mi)
- Elevation: 379 m (1,243 ft)

Population (2022)
  - Total: 11,027
  - Density: 2,200/km^{2} (5,700/sq mi)
- Tanzanian Postal Code: 63523

Jida is an administrative ward in Masasi Town Council of Mtwara Region in Tanzania. The ward covers an area of 90.4 km^{2} (34.9 sq mi), and has an average elevation of 403 m (1,322 ft). According to the 2022 census, the ward has a total population of 11,027.
