= Mkuti =

Ward in Masasi Town District Council, Mtwara Region

Mkuti Kata ya Mkuti (Swahili)
- Ward
- Kata ya Mkuti, Wilaya na Halmashauri ya Masasi Mjini
- Location within Tanzania
- Country: Tanzania
- Region: Mtwara Region
- District: Masasi Town Council

Area
  - Total: 2.9 km^{2} (1.1 sq mi)
- Elevation: 407 m (1,335 ft)

Population (2012)
  - Total: 7,807
  - Density: 2,700/km^{2} (7,000/sq mi)
- Tanzanian Postal Code: 63501

Mkuti is an administrative ward in Masasi Town Council of Mtwara Region in Tanzania. The ward covers an area of 2.9 km^{2} (1.1 sq mi), and has an average elevation of 407 m (1,335 ft). According to the 2012 census, the ward has a total population of 7,807.
