= Nyasa, Masasi Town =

Ward in Masasi Town District Council, Mtwara Region

Nyasa Kata ya Nyasa (Swahili)
- Ward
- Kata ya Nyasa, Wilaya na Halmashauri ya Masasi Mjini
- Location within Tanzania
- Country: Tanzania
- Region: Mtwara Region
- District: Masasi Town Council

Area
  - Total: 22.6 km^{2} (8.7 sq mi)
- Elevation: 396 m (1,299 ft)

Population (2012)
  - Total: 14,368
  - Density: 636/km^{2} (1,650/sq mi)
- Tanzanian Postal Code: 63502

Nyasa is an administrative ward in Masasi Town Council of Mtwara Region in Tanzania. The ward covers an area of 22.6 km^{2} (8.7 sq mi), and has an average elevation of 396 m (1,299 ft). According to the 2012 census, the ward has a total population of 14,368.
