= Marika, Masasi Town =

Ward in Masasi Town District Council, Mtwara Region

Marika Kata ya Marika (Swahili)
- Ward
- Kata ya Marika, Wilaya na Halmashauri ya Masasi Mjini
- Location within Tanzania
- Country: Tanzania
- Region: Mtwara Region
- District: Masasi Town Council

Area
  - Total: 148.6 km^{2} (57.4 sq mi)
- Elevation: 294 m (965 ft)

Population (2012)
  - Total: 11,175
  - Density: 75.20/km^{2} (194.8/sq mi)
- Tanzanian Postal Code: 63502

Marika is an administrative ward in Masasi Town Council of Mtwara Region in Tanzania. The ward covers an area of 148.6 km^{2} (57.4 sq mi), and has an average elevation of 294 m (965 ft). According to the 2012 census, the ward has a total population of 11,175.
