= Majengo, Mtwara-Mikindani =

Ward in Mtwara-Mikindani District, Mtwara Region

Majengo Kata ya Majengo (Swahili)
- Ward
- Kata ya Majengo, Wilaya ya Mtwara-Mikindani
- Location within Tanzania
- Country: Tanzania
- Region: Mtwara Region
- District: Mtwara-Mikindani District

Area
  - Total: 0.4 km^{2} (0.15 sq mi)
- Elevation: 14 m (46 ft)

Population (2012)
  - Total: 3,859
  - Density: 9,600/km^{2} (25,000/sq mi)
- Tanzanian Postal Code: 63106

Majengo is an administrative ward in Mtwara-Mikindani District of Mtwara Region in Tanzania. The ward covers an area of 0.4 km^{2} (0.15 sq mi), and has an average elevation of 14 m (46 ft). According to the 2012 census, the ward has a total population of 3,859.
