= Shangani, Mtwara-Mikindani =

Ward in Mtwara-Mikindani District, Mtwara Region

Shangani Kata ya Shangani (Swahili)
- Ward
- Kata ya Shangani, Wilaya ya Mtwara-Mikindani
- Location within Tanzania
- Country: Tanzania
- Region: Mtwara Region
- District: Mtwara-Mikindani District

Area
  - Total: 6 km^{2} (2.3 sq mi)
- Elevation: 4 m (13 ft)

Population (2012)
  - Total: 12,896
  - Density: 2,100/km^{2} (5,600/sq mi)
- Tanzanian Postal Code: 63104

Shangani is an administrative ward in Mtwara-Mikindani District of Mtwara Region in Tanzania. The ward covers an area of 6 km^{2} (2.3 sq mi), and has an average elevation of 4 m (13 ft). According to the 2012 census, the ward has a total population of 12,896.
