= Mwenge, Masasi Town =

Ward in Masasi Town District Council, Mtwara Region

Mwenge Kata ya Mwenge (Swahili)
- Ward
- Kata ya Mwenge, Wilaya na Halmashauri ya Masasi Mjini
- Location within Tanzania
- Country: Tanzania
- Region: Mtwara Region
- District: Masasi Town Council

Area
  - Total: 90.4 km^{2} (34.9 sq mi)
- Elevation: 379 m (1,243 ft)

Population (2012)
  - Total: 7,222
  - Density: 79.9/km^{2} (207/sq mi)
- Tanzanian Postal Code: 63535

Mwenge is an administrative ward in Masasi Town Council of Mtwara Region in Tanzania. The ward covers an area of 90.4 km^{2} (34.9 sq mi), and has an average elevation of 379 m (1,243 ft). According to the 2012 census, the ward has a total population of 7,222.
