= Magengeni =

Ward in Mtwara-Mikindani District, Mtwara Region

Magengeni Ward Kata ya Magengeni (Swahili)
- Ward
- Kata ya Magengeni, Wilaya ya Mtwara-Mikindani
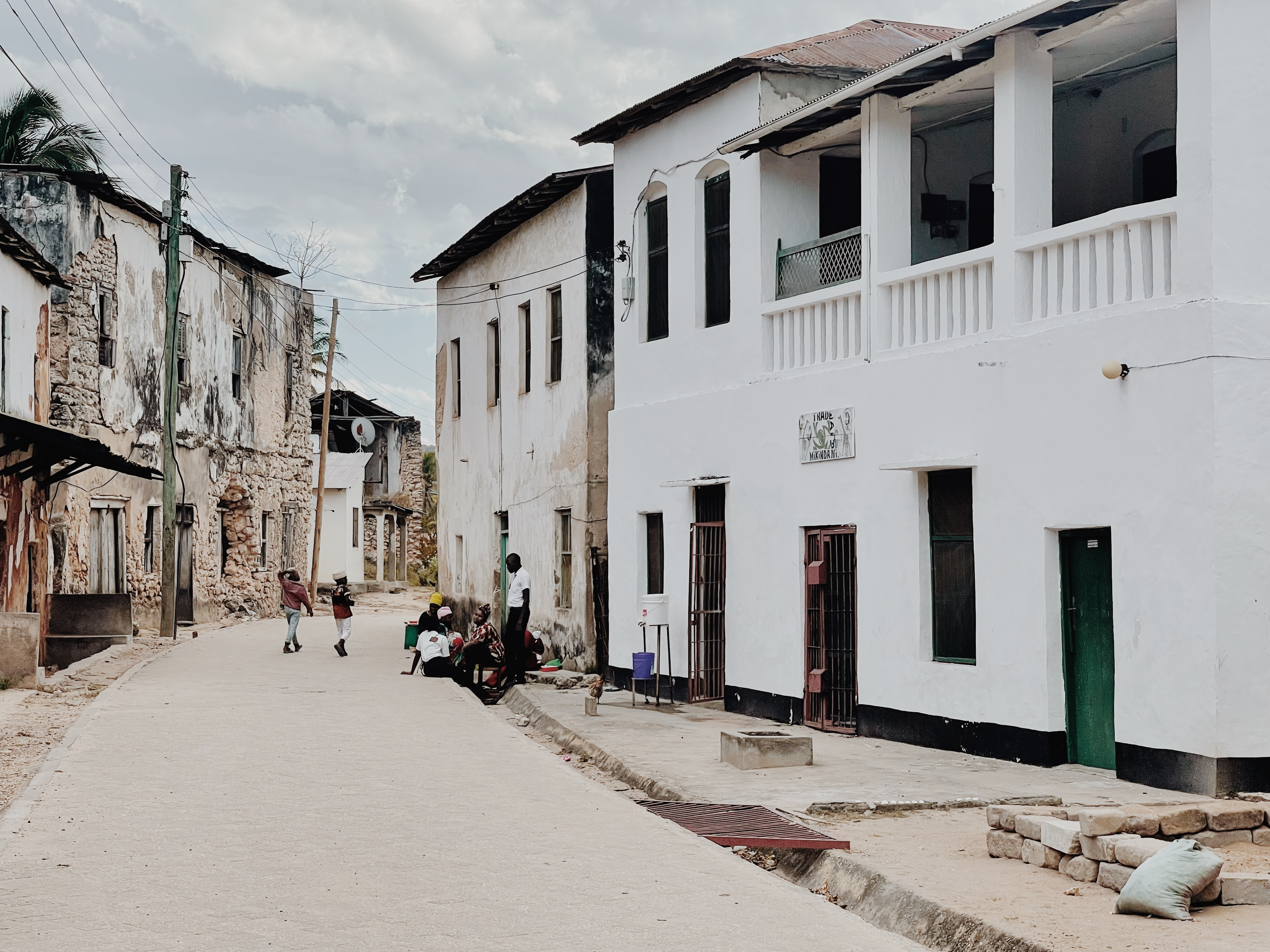
- Street scene, Magengeni Mikindani

- Location within Tanzania
- Country: Tanzania
- Region: Mtwara Region
- District: Mtwara-Mikindani District

Area
  - Total: 13.7 km^{2} (5.3 sq mi)
- Elevation: 25 m (82 ft)

Population (2012)
  - Total: 1,800
  - Density: 130/km^{2} (340/sq mi)
- Tanzanian Postal Code: 63110

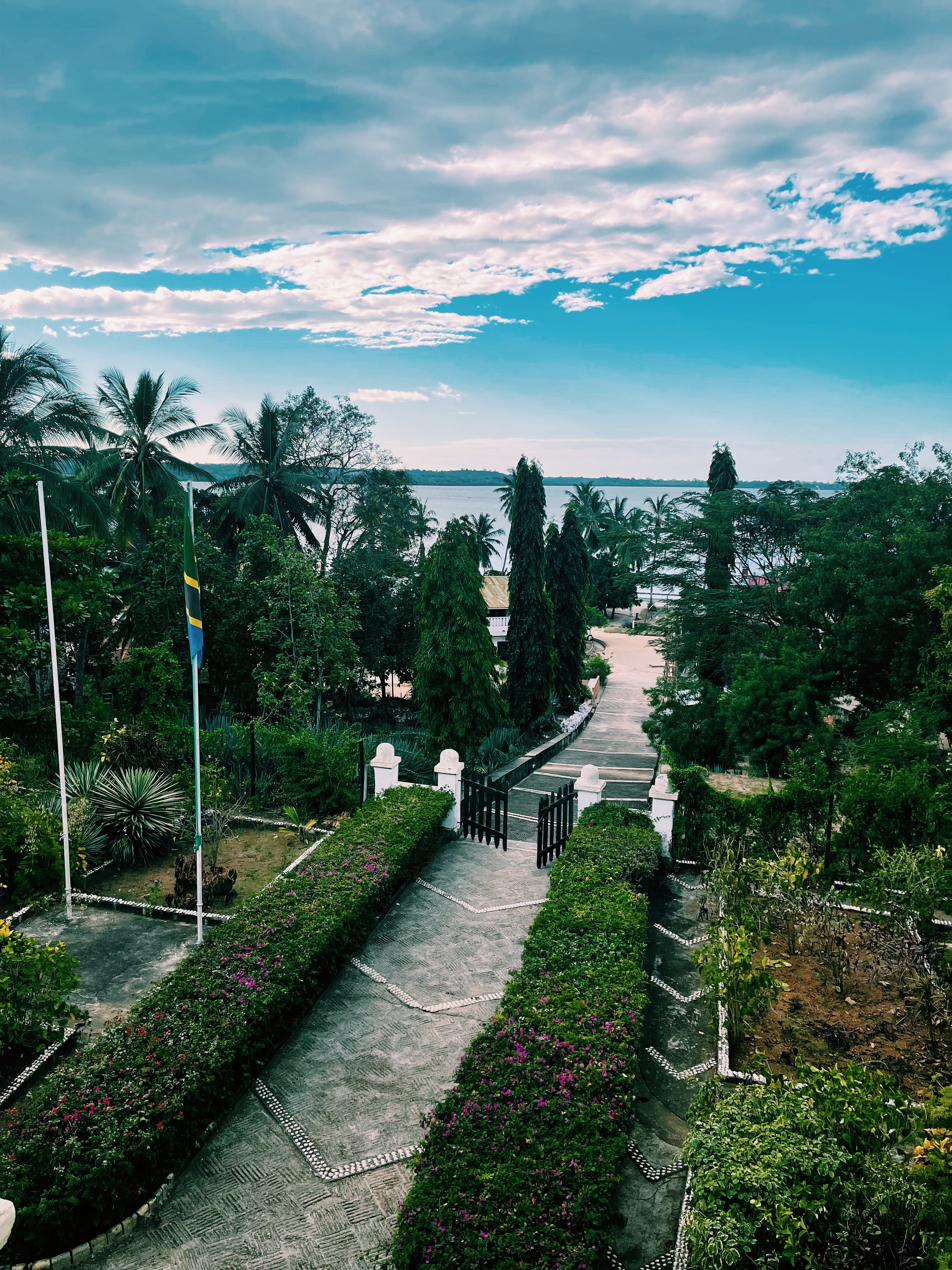
Old boma Magengeni ward, Mikindani

Magengeni is an administrative ward in Mtwara-Mikindani District of Mtwara Region in Tanzania. The ward covers an area of 13.7 km^{2} (5.3 sq mi), and has an average elevation of 25 m (82 ft). According to the 2012 census, the ward has a total population of 1,712.
