= Mitengo =

Ward in Mtwara-Mikindani District, Mtwara Region

Mitengo Kata ya Mitengo (Swahili)
- Ward
- Kata ya Mitengo, Wilaya ya Mtwara-Mikindani
- Location within Tanzania
- Country: Tanzania
- Region: Mtwara Region
- District: Mtwara-Mikindani District

Area
  - Total: 10.8 km^{2} (4.2 sq mi)
- Elevation: 29 m (95 ft)

Population (2022)
  - Total: 5,790
  - Density: 536/km^{2} (1,390/sq mi)
- Tanzanian Postal Code: 63109

Mitengo is an administrative ward in Mtwara-Mikindani District of Mtwara Region in Tanzania. The ward covers an area of 10.8 km^{2} (4.2 sq mi), and has an average elevation of 29 m (95 ft). According to the 2022 census, the ward has a total population of 5,790.
