= Naliendele =

Ward in Mtwara-Mikindani District, Mtwara Region

Naliendele Kata ya Naliendele (Swahili)
- Ward
- Kata ya Naliendele, Wilaya ya Mtwara-Mikindani
- Location within Tanzania
- Country: Tanzania
- Region: Mtwara Region
- District: Mtwara-Mikindani District

Area
  - Total: 43.3 km^{2} (16.7 sq mi)
- Elevation: 40 m (130 ft)

Population (2012)
  - Total: 7,240
  - Density: 167/km^{2} (433/sq mi)
- Tanzanian Postal Code: 63115

Naliendele is an administrative ward in Mtwara-Mikindani District of Mtwara Region in Tanzania. The ward covers an area of 43.3 km^{2} (16.7 sq mi), and has an average elevation of 40 m (130 ft). According to the 2012 census, the ward has a total population of 7,240.
