= Kisungule =

Ward in Mtwara-Mikindani District, Mtwara Region

Kisungule Kata ya Kisungule (Swahili)
- Ward
- Kata ya Kisungule, Wilaya ya Mtwara-Mikindani
- Location within Tanzania
- Country: Tanzania
- Region: Mtwara Region
- District: Mtwara-Mikindani District

Area
  - Total: 3.7 km^{2} (1.4 sq mi)
- Elevation: 29 m (95 ft)

Population (2012)
  - Total: 1,123
  - Density: 300/km^{2} (790/sq mi)
- Tanzanian Postal Code: 63112

Kisungule is an administrative ward in Mtwara-Mikindani District of Mtwara Region in Tanzania. The ward covers an area of 3.7 km^{2} (1.4 sq mi), and has an average elevation of 29 m (95 ft). According to the 2012 census, the ward has a total population of 1,123.
