= Mchauru =

- Location in Tanzania
- Coordinates: 11.0032°S 39.2577°E
- Country: Tanzania
- Region: Mtwara Region
- District: Masasi

Mchauru is a village, in the south east of the country of Tanzania. Mchauru is also the name of the associated electoral division of Masasi District, Mtwara. The area shares its name with the Mchauru River.

== Geography ==
The village lies at a latitude of -11.003 and longitude of 39.258 and it has an elevation of 242 meters above sea level. As at the 2022 census the electoral ward had a population of 12,941 living in 4,095 households.

=== Mchauru River ===
The river is a left-bank tributary of the Ruvuma River, with its mouth near the village of Maparawe at latitude 11.141 south longitude 39.130 east.
