= Ufukoni =

Ward in Mtwara-Mikindani District, Mtwara Region

Ufukoni Kata ya Ufukoni (Swahili)
- Ward
- Kata ya Ufukoni, Wilaya ya Mtwara-Mikindani
- Location within Tanzania
- Country: Tanzania
- Region: Mtwara Region
- District: Mtwara-Mikindani District

Area
  - Total: 17.2 km^{2} (6.6 sq mi)
- Elevation: 85 m (279 ft)

Population (2012)
  - Total: 25,011
  - Density: 1,450/km^{2} (3,770/sq mi)
- Tanzanian Postal Code: 63108

Ufukoni is an administrative ward in Mtwara-Mikindani District of Mtwara Region in Tanzania. The ward covers an area of 17.2 km^{2} (6.6 sq mi), and has an average elevation of 85 m (279 ft). According to the 2012 census, the ward has a total population of 25,011.
