= Vigaeni =

Ward in Mtwara-Mikindani District, Mtwara Region

Vigaeni Kata ya Vigaeni (Swahili)
- Ward
- Kata ya Vigaeni, Wilaya ya Mtwara-Mikindani
- Location within Tanzania
- Country: Tanzania
- Region: Mtwara Region
- District: Mtwara-Mikindani District

Area
  - Total: 0.6 km^{2} (0.23 sq mi)
- Elevation: 9 m (30 ft)

Population (2012)
  - Total: 3,673
  - Density: 6,100/km^{2} (16,000/sq mi)
- Tanzanian Postal Code: 63103

Vigaeni is an administrative ward in Mtwara-Mikindani District of Mtwara Region in Tanzania. The ward covers an area of 0.6 km^{2} (0.23 sq mi), and has an average elevation of 9 m (30 ft). According to the 2012 census, the ward has a total population of 3,673.
