= Railway, Mtwara-Mikindani =

Ward in Mtwara-Mikindani District, Mtwara Region

Railway Kata ya Railway (Swahili)
- Ward
- Kata ya Railway, Wilaya ya Mtwara-Mikindani
- Location within Tanzania
- Country: Tanzania
- Region: Mtwara Region
- District: Mtwara-Mikindani District

Area
  - Total: 2 km^{2} (0.77 sq mi)
- Elevation: 7 m (23 ft)

Population (2012)
  - Total: 2,789
  - Density: 1,400/km^{2} (3,600/sq mi)
- Tanzanian Postal Code: 63101

Railway is an administrative ward in Mtwara-Mikindani District of Mtwara Region in Tanzania. The ward covers an area of 0.4 km^{2} (0.15 sq mi), and has an average elevation of 7 m (23 ft). According to the 2012 census, the ward has a total population of 2,789.
