= Mtonya =

Ward in Mtwara-Mikindani District, Mtwara Region

Mtonya Kata ya Mtonya (Swahili)
- Ward
- Kata ya Mtonya, Wilaya ya Mtwara-Mikindani
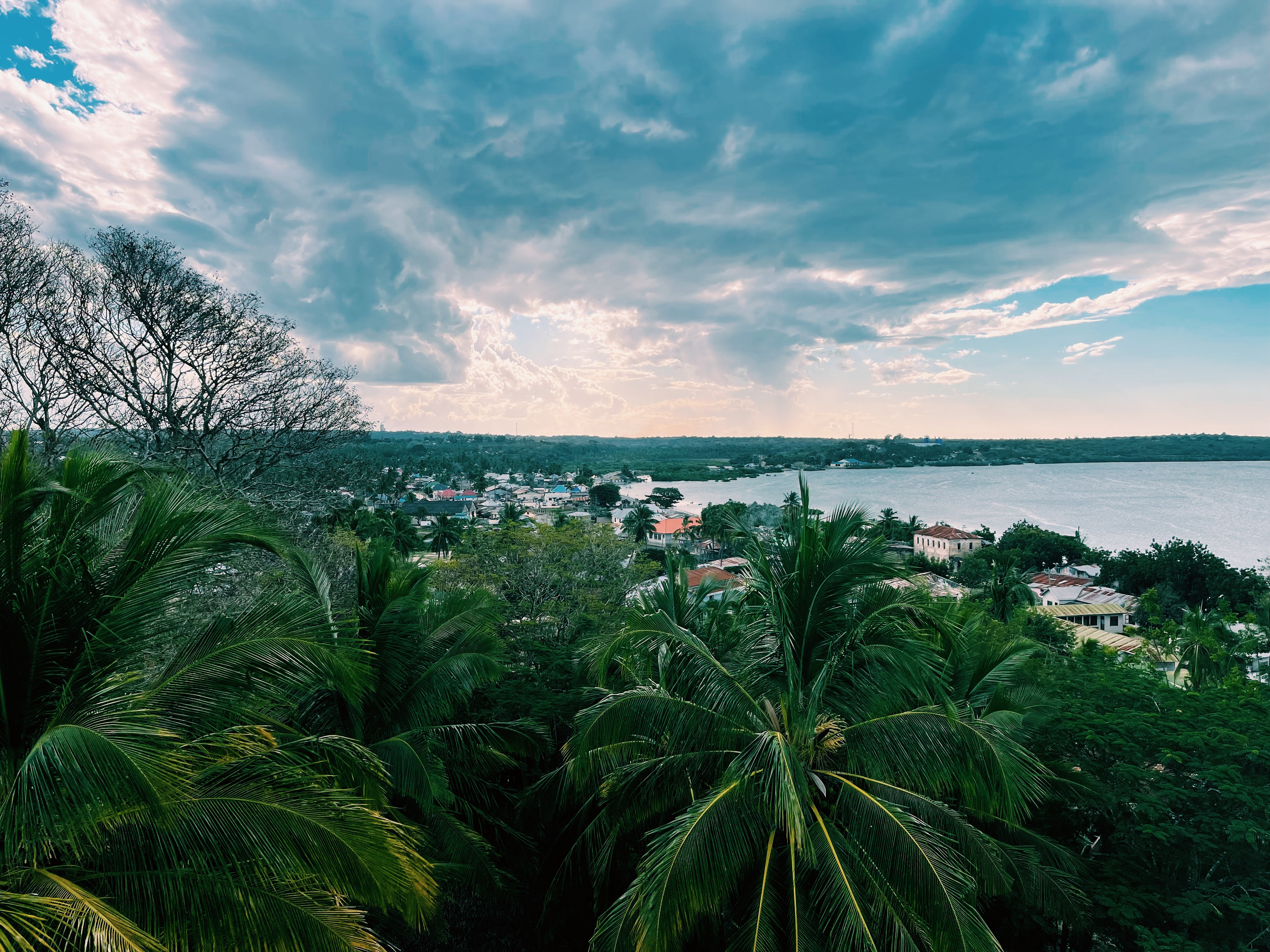
- Birds eye view of Mtonya Ward, Mikindani

- Location within Tanzania
- Country: Tanzania
- Region: Mtwara Region
- District: Mtwara-Mikindani District

Area
  - Total: 3.6 km^{2} (1.4 sq mi)
- Elevation: 50 m (160 ft)

Population (2012)
  - Total: 1,912
  - Density: 530/km^{2} (1,400/sq mi)
- Tanzanian Postal Code: 63111

Mtonya is an administrative ward in Mtwara-Mikindani District of Mtwara Region in Tanzania. The ward covers an area of 3.6 km^{2} (1.4 sq mi), and has an average elevation of 50 m (160 ft). According to the 2012 census, the ward has a total population of 1,712.
