= Temeke, Masasi Town =

Ward in Masasi Town District Council, Mtwara Region

Temeke Kata ya Temeke (Swahili)
- Ward
- Kata ya Temeke, Wilaya na Halmashauri ya Masasi Mjini
- Location within Tanzania
- Country: Tanzania
- Region: Mtwara Region
- District: Masasi Town Council

Area
  - Total: 88.2 km^{2} (34.1 sq mi)
- Elevation: 393 m (1,289 ft)

Population (2012)
  - Total: 11,547
  - Density: 131/km^{2} (339/sq mi)
- Tanzanian Postal Code: 63528

Temeke is an administrative ward in Masasi Town Council of Mtwara Region in Tanzania. The ward covers an area of 88.2 km^{2} (34.1 sq mi), and has an average elevation of 393 m (1,289 ft). According to the 2012 census, the ward has a total population of 11,547.
