= Migongo =

Ward in Masasi Town District Council, Mtwara Region

Migongo Kata ya Migongo (Swahili)
- Ward
- Kata ya Migongo, Wilaya na Halmashauri ya Masasi Mjini
- Location within Tanzania
- Country: Tanzania
- Region: Mtwara Region
- District: Masasi Town Council

Area
  - Total: 9.5 km^{2} (3.7 sq mi)
- Elevation: 411 m (1,348 ft)

Population (2012)
  - Total: 4,447
  - Density: 470/km^{2} (1,200/sq mi)
- Tanzanian Postal Code: 63525

Migongo is an administrative ward in Masasi Town Council of Mtwara Region in Tanzania. The ward covers an area of 9.5 km^{2} (3.7 sq mi), and has an average elevation of 411 m (1,348 ft). According to the 2012 census, the ward has a total population of 4,447.
