= Newala Town Council =

District in Mtwara, Tanzania

Newala Town
- District
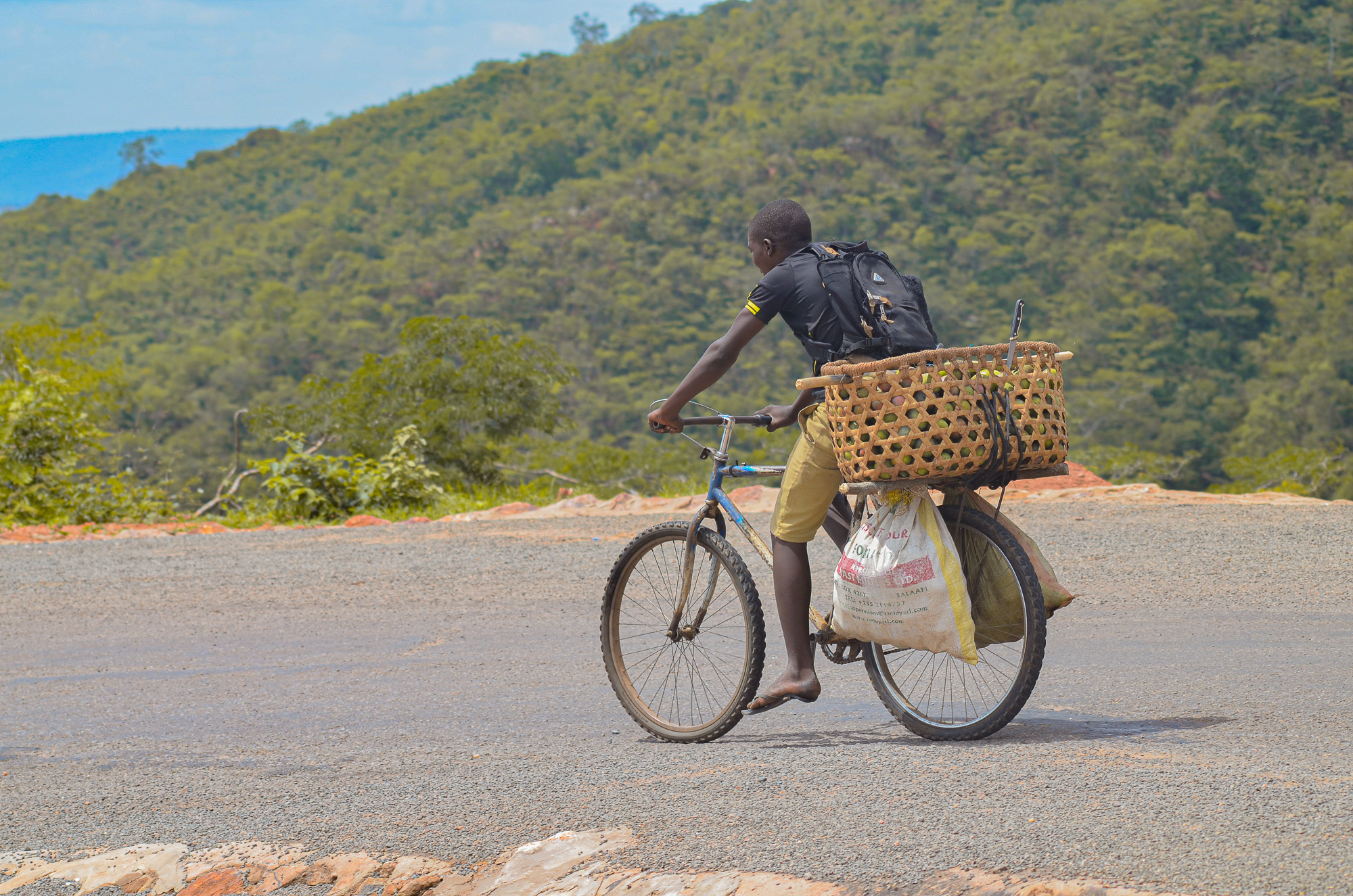
- Fruit vendor in Newala

- Newala Town in Mtwara Region of Tanzania
- Coordinates: 10.95°S 39.276°E
- Country: Tanzania
- Region: Mtwara Region
- District: Newala Town
- Established: 2015
- Headquarters: Newala

Government
  - Type: Council
  - Chairman: Yusuph H. Kateule
  - Director: Shamim D. Mwariko

Area
  - District: 525.62 km^{2} (202.94 sq mi)
- Elevation: 812 m (2,664 ft)

Population (2022 census)
  - District: 104,349
  - Density: 198.53/km^{2} (514.18/sq mi)
  - Urban: 34,862
- Time zone: EAT
- Area code: 023
- Website: District Website

Newala Town, is a district level town council in the Mtwara Region in the southern coastal Tanzania. The town is in the south central portion of the Mtwara Region, on the northern bank of the Ruvuma River that is the border between Tanzania and Mozambique. The district was established on the 25th of September, 2015.

== Geography ==
Newala Town is in Mtwara Region with Newala District's wards of Nakahako and Chitekete to the north, Tandahimba District to the East, the country of Mozambique across the Ruvuma River to the south, and Masasi District to the west. The town council covers an area of 525.62 kilometres (326.61 mi).

God's Pit, Shimo la Mungu in kiswahili, is a large pit next to the town of Newala. Occasionally, God's Pit will release clouds of mist that cover the town and surrounding areas.

=== Climate ===
Newala has a steppe climate with annual precipitation of 677 millimetres (26.7 in). The wet seasons is from December to April, and dry season between June and September. June is the warmest month with an average temperature of 20.9 °C (69.6 °F) and November being the coolest month with an average temperature of 24.7 °C (76.5 °F).

=== Administrative areas ===
In 2022 the district administers 2 divisions, 16 wards, 48 villages, 11 suburbs, and 189 hamlets.

Divisions and Wards (2016 population)

- Newala (60,721)
  - Julia (3,434)
  - Luchingu (12,920)
  - Mahumbika (3,578)
  - Makonga (8,288)
  - Makote (5,931)
  - Mkulung'ulu (2,710)
  - Mnekachi (6,438)
  - Mtonya (272)
  - Namiyonga (3,974)
  - Nangwala (8,860)
  - Tulindane (4,316)
- Mkunya (33,007)
  - Nanguruwe (7,785)
  - Mkunya (6,682)
  - Mcholi I (6,796)
  - Mcholi II (6,303)
  - Mtumachi (5,441)

== Demographics ==
In 2016 the Tanzania National Bureau of Statistics report there were 93,728 people in the town council, from 89,251 in 2012. Almost all of the population of the district is of the Makonde tribe with some Makua and Yao.

== Economy ==
The economy is almost entirely farming, particularly cashew nuts. The district has 43,126 hectors of arable land, of which 1,820 can be irrigated. Cashew nuts are the primary cash crop as the as they make up much of the native trees in the district. Other crops are groundnuts, cassava, millet, paddy, beans, maize and potatoes. Also grown are tomatoes, mangoes and oranges. The Tandahimba and Newala Cooperative Union (Tanecu) is the primary union in Newala Town, and the unions main auction is located in the town.

The production of cashews has grown rapidly in Tanzania, and much of that is in Newala Town. In 2019 the town had industrial capacity of 8,500 t/y for cashew nuts. The implementation of irrigation schemes, industrial sprayers, pesticides, and sulphur powder has grown production in the country from 5,000 tonnes in 2013 to 13,500 tonnes in 2022. For raw cashews from 2013 to 2022 it has increased from 127,947 to 238,576 tonnes. The national government has set the goal of 700,000 tonnes in the year 2025.

== Education ==
The district has 45 public and 5 private primary schools with a 30% drop out rate in 2018. There are 11 secondary schools in the district. Nine are for forms 1 to 4 and two are forms 1 to 6. In 2018 there was a 44% drop out rate in secondary schools and significantly more girls in the schools than boys at 2,491 girls to 1,855 boys.

== Health ==
The town district has one hospital, 14 dispensaries, not health centres, and one private health facility. The main disease problem in the Newala Town is Malaria with 25,602 cases, accounting for 53% off all disease cases in the district. Clean drinking water is not easily available. In 2018 57% of the population had access to safe, clean, and affordable water.

== Roads ==
Most of the roads in the district are unpaved. Of the 578.84 kilometres (359.67 mi) of road, 426.84 km (265.23 mi)(74%) is dirt, 130.25 km (80.93 mi)(23%) is gravel, and 21.75 km (13.51 mi)(3%) is paved.
