= Masasi Town Council =

District in Mtwara Region, Tanzania

Masasi Town Council Wilaya ya Masasi Mjini (Swahili)
- District
- Wilaya na Halmashauri ya Masasi Mjini, Mkoa wa Mtwara
- Nickname: "Cashew town"
- Masasi Town District of Mtwara Region
- Coordinates: 10°44′5.64″S 38°48′15.84″E
- Country: Tanzania
- Region: Mtwara Region
- District: Masasi Town Council District

Area
  - District: 753.3 km^{2} (290.9 sq mi)
- Elevation: 433 m (1,421 ft)

Population (2022 census)
  - District: 136,585
  - Density: 181.3/km^{2} (469.6/sq mi)
  - Urban: 89,700
- Demonym: Masasi Towner
- Tanzanian Postal Code: 635**

Masasi Town District Council is one of eight regional councils of the Mtwara Region in Tanzania. It is bordered to the north and south by the Masasi District, to the east by the Newala District and to the west by the Nanyumbu District. According to the 2012 census, the district has a total population of 102,969.

== Geography ==
The district covers an area of 753.3 km^{2} (290.9 sq mi), and has an average elevation of 433 m (1,421 ft).

== Administrative subdivisions ==
=== Wards ===
The Masasi Town Council administratively has 14 wards.

1. Chanikanguo
2. Jida
3. Marika
4. Matawale
5. Migongo
6. Mkomaindo
7. Mkuti
8. Mpindimbi
9. Mtandi
10. Mwenge
11. Mwenge Mtapika
12. Nyasa
13. Napupa
14. Sululu
15. Temeke
