= Mtwara District =

District in Mtwara Region, Tanzania

Mtwara District Wilaya ya Mtwara (Swahili)
- District
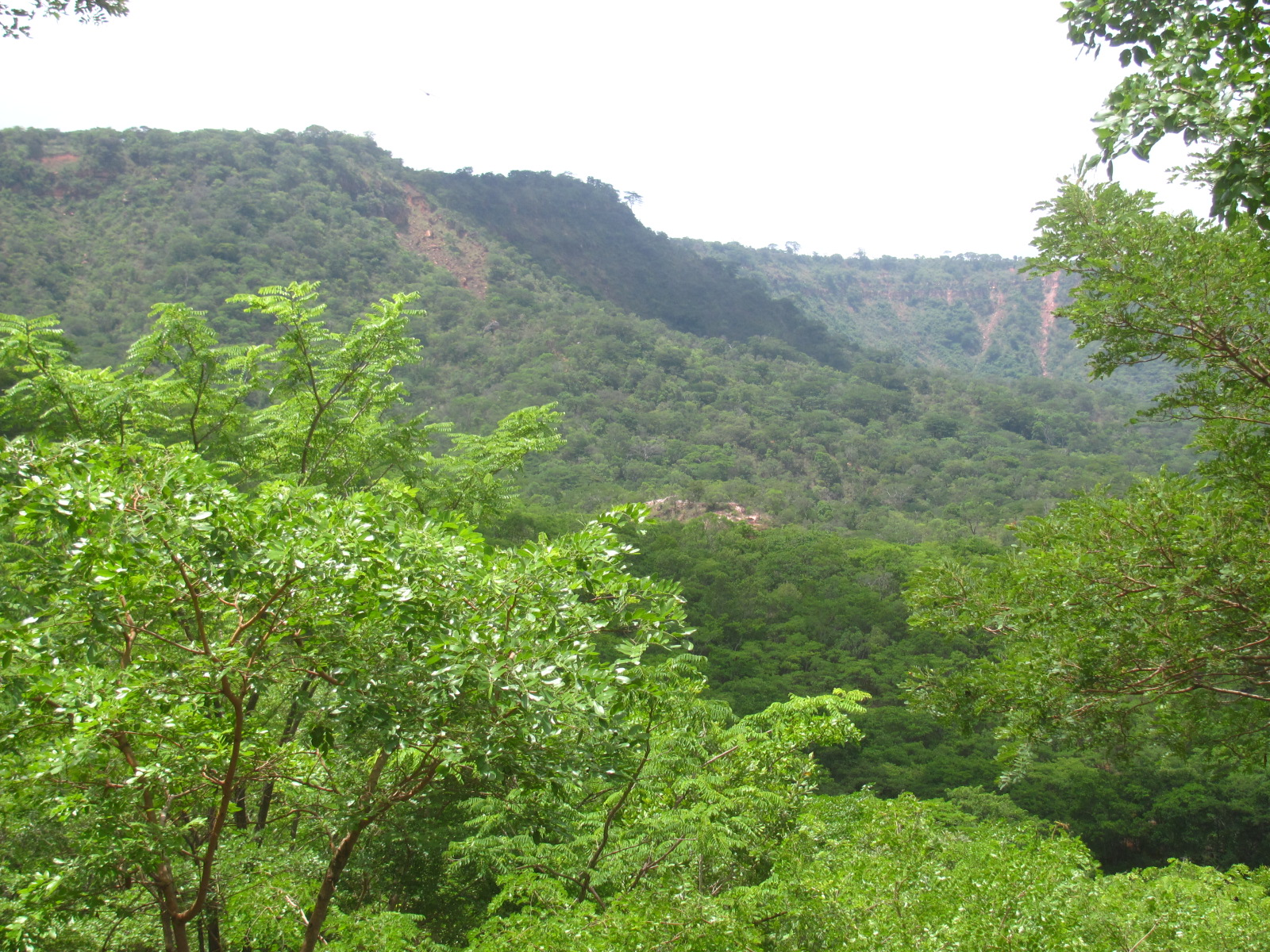
- Miombo woodland on the North escarpment of the Plateau

- Mtwara District of Mtwara Region
- Coordinates: 10.4701°S 40.0676°E
- Country: Tanzania
- Region: Mtwara Region
- District: Mtwara District
- Established: 1971

Government
  - Type: Council
  - Chairman: Selemani Nampanye
  - Director: Erica E. Yegella

Area
  - Total: 3,597 km^{2} (1,389 sq mi)
- Elevation: 150 m (490 ft)

Population (2016)
  - Total: 132,329
  - Density: 36.79/km^{2} (95.28/sq mi)
- Time zone: EAT
- Postcode: 21xxx
- Area code: 023
- Website: District Website

Mtwara District is one of the five districts of the Mtwara Region of Tanzania. It is bordered to the south by Mozambique, to the west by the Tandahimba District, to the north by the Lindi Region and to the east by Mtwara-Mikindani District and the Indian Ocean.

In 2016 the Tanzania National Bureau of Statistics report there were 132,329 people in the ward, from 228,003 in 2012 before split of Nanyamba Town Council is 2014.

Most of the residents are from the Makonde and Makua tribes.

The area of the Mtwara Rural District is 3,597 km².

== Wards ==
The Mtwara District is administratively divided into 5 divisions, 21 wards, and 110 villages.
