= Tandahimba District =

District in Mtwara Region, Tanzania

Coordinates: 10.723°S 39.569°E

Tandahimba Wilaya ya Tandahimba (Swahili)
- District
- Tandahimba District of Mtwara Region
- Country: Tanzania
- Region: Mtwara Region

Area
  - Total: 2,048 km^{2} (791 sq mi)

Population (2022)
  - Total: 299,073
  - Density: 146.0/km^{2} (378.2/sq mi)

Tandahimba is one of the six districts of the Mtwara Region of Tanzania. It is bordered to the east by the Mtwara Rural District, to the south by Mozambique, to the west by the Newala District, and to the north by the Lindi Region.

According to the 2022 Tanzania National Census, the population of the Tandahi mba District was 299,073.

== Wards ==
The Tandahimba District is administratively divided into 22 wards:

- Chaume
- Chigungwe
- Kishumundu
- Kitama
- Luagala
- Lukokoda
- Lyenje
- Mahuta
- Maundo
- Michenjele
- Mihambwe
- Milongodi
- Mdimba Mnyoma
- Mkonjowano
- Mkoreha
- Mkwiti
- Mnyawa
- Namikupa
- Nanhyanga
- Naputa
- Ngunja
- Tandahimba
