= Newala District =

District in Mtwara Region, Tanzania

Newala Wilaya ya Newala (Swahili)
- District
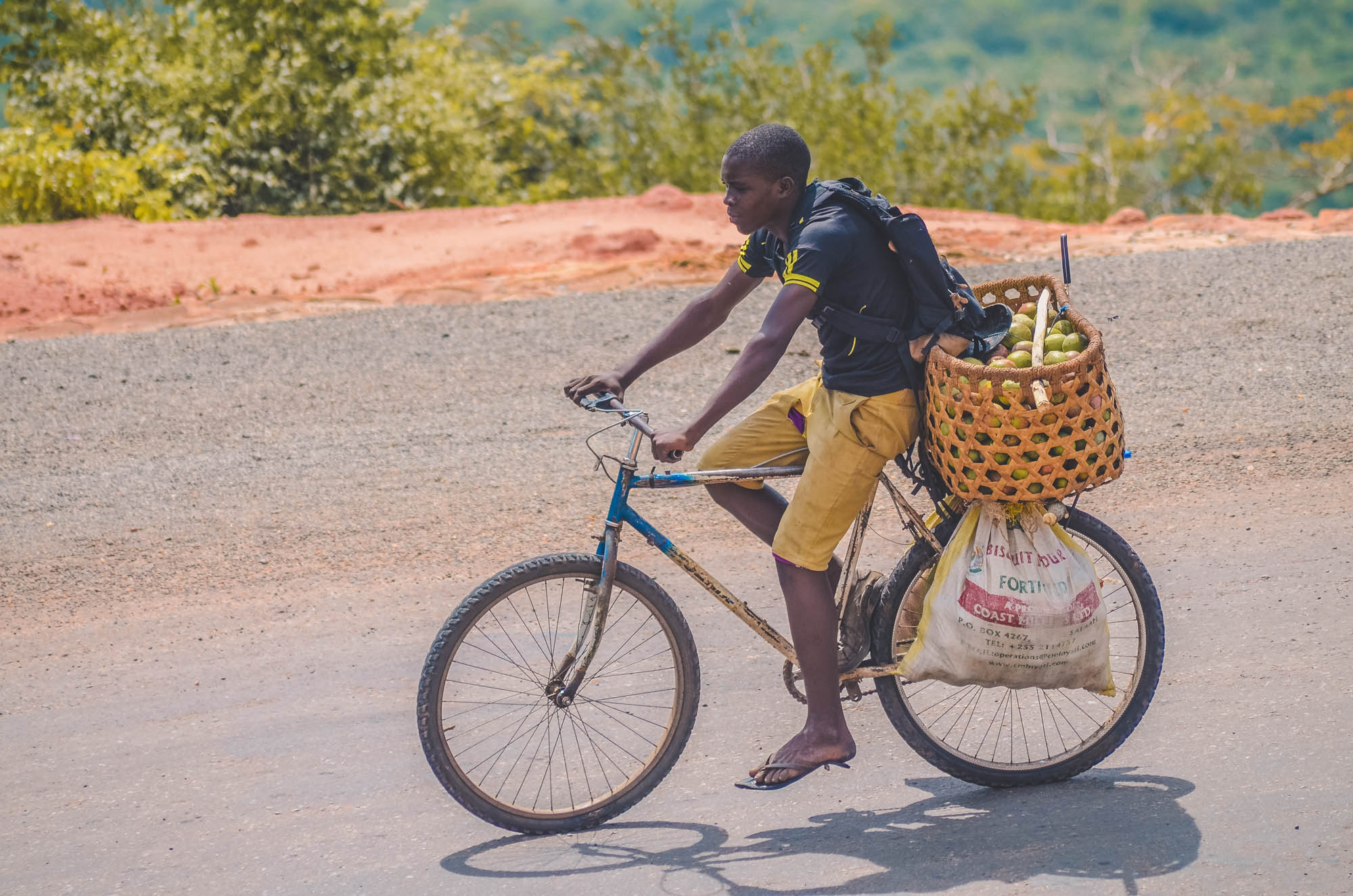
- A local fruit seller from Newala travelling towards the villages near Mozambique.

- Newala District of Mtwara Region
- Coordinates: 10.62°S 39.29°E
- Country: Tanzania
- Region: Mtwara Region
- District: Newala District

Government
  - Type: Council
  - Chairman: Ladda Mfaume Tamimu
  - Director: Duncan Golden Thebas

Population (2016)
  - Total: 122,072
- Time zone: EAT
- Postcode: 21xxx
- Area code: 023
- Website: District website

Newala is a district of the Mtwara Region of Tanzania. It is bordered to the west by Masasi District, to the east by Tandahimba District, to the south by Newala Town, and to the north by Tandahimba and Masasi Districts. The district includes the Miyuyu Forest Reserve.

In 2016 the Tanzania National Bureau of Statistics reported there were 122,072 people in the ward, down from 205,492 in 2012. The decrease was due to the creation of the Newala Town council in 2014. Most of the inhabitants are from the Makonde tribe.

== Administrative areas ==
The Newala District is administratively divided into 4 divisions, 22 wards, 107 villages and 302 hamlets.

Wards (2016 population)

- Chihangu (6,064)
- Chilangalanga (6,054)
- Chitekete (4,117)
- Chiwonga (5,564)
- Kitangari (8,150)
- Makukwe (6,637)
- Malatu (6,580)
- Maputi (6,743)
- Mchemo (9,331)
- Mdimba Mpelempele (4,049)
- Mikumbi (4,106)
- Mkoma II (2,976)
- Mkwedu (6,759)
- Mnyambe (7,958)
- Mnyeu (3,020)
- Mpwapwa (3,819)
- Mtopwa (5,882)
- Mtunguru (6,350)
- Muungano (3,812)
- Nakahako (4,733)
- Nambali (6,611)
- Nandwahi (6,575)
