= Masasi District =

Coordinates: 10.717°S 38.800°E

Masasi District Wilaya ya Masasi (Swahili)
- District
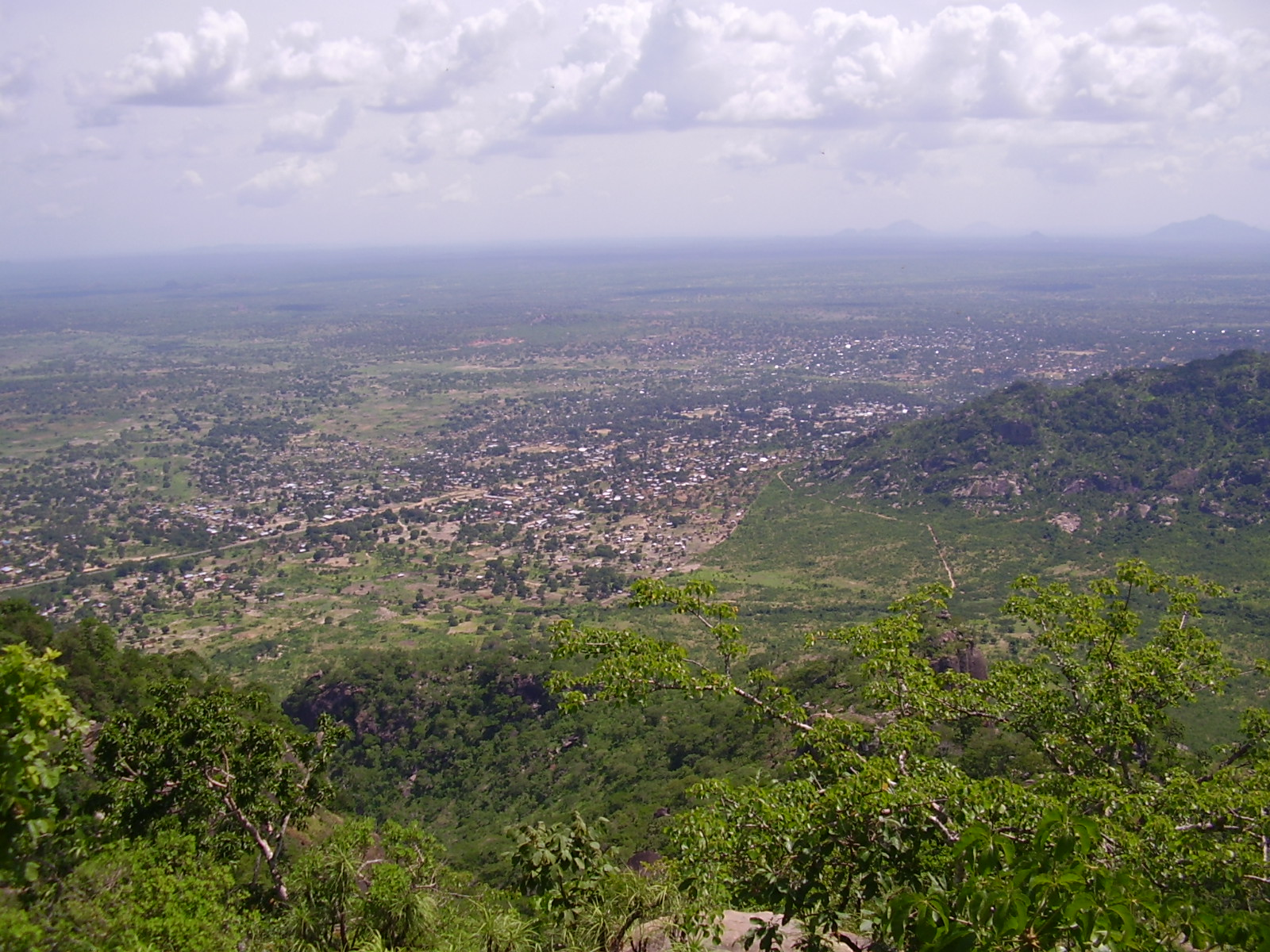

- Masasi District of Mtwara Region
- Country: Tanzania
- Region: Mtwara Region

Area
  - Total: 753.3 km^{2} (290.9 sq mi)

Population (2022)
  - Total: 137,585
  - Density: 182.6/km^{2} (473.0/sq mi)
- Time zone: UTC+3 (EAT)
- Website: District Council website

Masasi is one of the six districts of the Mtwara Region of Tanzania. It is bordered to the north by the Lindi Region, to the east by the Newala District, to the south by the Ruvuma River and Mozambique and to the west by Nanyumbu District.

According to the 2022 Tanzania National Census, the population of Masasi District was 314,778 and in Masasi town the population was 137,585.

== Council ==
Masasi District Council is among nine councils comprising Mtwara Region.

The district shares a border with Nachingwea and Ruangwa Districts to the North, Lindi and Newala Districts to the east, Ruvuma River to the south and Nanyumbu district to the West. The council's headquarters is situated 210 kilometers west of Mtwara Municipality which is the regional headquarters. The Masasi district council is also surrounding a new Masasi town council which started its operations in July 2012.

The council has five administrative divisions, 34 wards, 166 villages and 864 hamlets. It has a total area of 3,829.9 km^{2} (1,478.7 sq mi), and the physical size is 20.8% of the whole region. Administratively Masasi is divided into two constituencies, Masasi and Lulindi. The council has a total of 46 councilors.

According to the National Population Census 2002, the district had a total population of 307,211 with an annual growth rate of 2.1 percent before the split of the councils. Currently, the population is 260,856 as per National Population Census 2012; 125,151 are male and 135,705 are female.

Masasi District Council is a council established under Section 5 of the Local Government (Urban/District Authorities) Act, 1982 under the ministerial establishment order No dated 1 January 1984 and Certification of Establishment No. 17420/12-83 issued by Clerk of the National Assembly on 31 December 1983.

== Subdivisions ==
The Masasi District is, as at 2023, administratively divided into 5 divisions and 34 wards:

=== Divisions ===
1. Chiungutwa
2. Chikundi
3. Lisekese B
4. Lulindi
5. Mchauru

=== Other Wards ===
1. Chigugu
2. Chikoropola
3. Chikukwe
4. Chikunja
5. Chiwale
6. Chiwata
7. Lipumburu
8. Lukuledi
9. Lupaso
10. Makong'onda
11. Mbuyuni
12. Mijelejele
13. Mitesi
14. Mkululu
15. Mlingula
16. Mnavira
17. Mpanyani
18. Mpeta
19. Mpindimbi
20. Msikisi
21. Mwena
22. Namajani
23. Namalenga
24. Namatutwe
25. Namwanga
26. Nanganga
27. Nanjota
28. Ndanda
29. Sindano
