= Nanyumbu District =

District of Mtwara Region, Tanzania

Nanyambu District
- district
- Location in Mtwara District
- Interactive map of Nanyambu District
- Coordinates: 10°55′58.97″S 38°22′53.82″E
- Country: Tanzania
- Region: Mtwara

Area
  - Total: 5,203 km^{2} (2,009 sq mi)

Population (2022)
  - Total: 204,323
  - Density: 39.27/km^{2} (101.7/sq mi)
- ISO 3166 code: TZ-17

Nanyumbu District is in the west of Mtwara Region in southern Tanzania.

The population of Nanyumbu was 204,323 in the 2022 census.

== Subdivisions ==
The district is divided into 14 wards:

Name	Population 2002	Population 2012
Chipupiuta	9,434	9,926
Likokona	16,079	18,629
Lumesule	7,163	7,656
Mangaka	-	16,494
Maratani	-	6,668
Masuguru	3,809	5,945
Mikangaula	14,914	16,848
Mkonona	5,929	8,137
Mnanje	-	7,912
Nandete	11,953	10,067
Nangomba	-	8,178
Nanyumbu	8,840	10,826
Napacho	8,270	10,092
Sengenya	11,261	13,479
