= Districts of Tanzania =

Districts in Tanzania

As of 2021, there are 31 regions (Swahili: mkoa, plural mikoa) of Tanzania which are divided into 184 districts (Swahili: wilaya).

In 2016, Songwe Region was created from the western part of Mbeya Region.

The districts are each administered by a district council. Cities are separately administered by their own councils, and while administratively within a region, are not considered to be located within a district. The districts are listed below, by unofficial area then region:

== Ten most populated districts ==
1. Kinondoni Municipal Council, Dar es Salaam Region
  (1,775,049 inhabitants)
2. Temeke Municipal Council, Dar es Salaam Region
  (1,368,881 inhabitants)
3. Ilala Municipal Council, Dar es Salaam Region
  (1,220,611 inhabitants)
4. Geita District Council, Geita Region
  (807,619 inhabitants)
5. Sengerema District Council, Mwanza Region
  (663,034 inhabitants)
6. Muleba District Council, Kagera Region
  (540,310 inhabitants)
7. Kahama District Council, Shinyanga Region
  (523,802 inhabitants)
8. Nzega District Council, Tabora Region
  (502,252 inhabitants)
9. Lushoto District Council, Tanga Region
  (492,441 inhabitants)
10. Moshi District Council, Kilimanjaro Region
  (466,737 inhabitants)

== Central ==
=== Dodoma Region ===
Dodoma region's districts

Dodoma Region
	Type	Population (2016)	Area	City/Town	Website
Dodoma City	City	446,640	2,608 km^{2} (1,007 sq mi)	Dodoma	District website
Kondoa Urban	Town	64,147		Kondoa	District website
Bahi District	Rural	240,891	5,633 km^{2} (2,175 sq mi)		District website
Chamwino District	Rural	359,244	9,204 km^{2} (3,554 sq mi)		District website
Chemba District (Tanzania)	Rural	256,178	7,290 km^{2} (2,810 sq mi)		District website
Kondoa District	Rural	228,976	5,792 km^{2} (2,236 sq mi)		District website
Kongwa District	Rural	336,888	3,958 km^{2} (1,528 sq mi)		District website
Mpwapwa District	Rural	331,544	7,455 km^{2} (2,878 sq mi)		District website
Total		2,264,508	41,311 km^{2} (15,950 sq mi)		Region website

=== Singida Region ===
Singida Region's Districts

Singida Region
	Type	Population (2016)	Area	City/Town	Website
Singida Urban	City	165,008	720.6 km^{2} (278.2 sq mi)	Singida	District website
Ikungi District	District	299,512	8,861 km^{2} (3,421 sq mi)		District website
Iramba District	District	259,267	4,487 km^{2} (1,732 sq mi)		District website
Itigi District	District	123,515			District website
Manyoni District	District	202,117	28,934 km^{2} (11,171 sq mi)		District website
Mkalama District	District	207,093	3,121 km^{2} (1,205 sq mi)		District website
Singida District	District	247,460	2,400 km^{2} (930 sq mi)		District website
Total		1,503,972	49,340 km^{2} (19,050 sq mi)		Region website

=== Tabora Region ===
Tabora Region's Districts

Tabora Region
	Type	Population (2016)	Area	City/Town	Website
Tabora Urban	City	255,173	1,461 km^{2} (564 sq mi)	Tabora	District website
Nzega Urban	Town	72,355		Nzega	District website
Igunga District	District	449,340	7,064 km^{2} (2,727 sq mi)		District website
Kaliua District	District	442,182	15,445 km^{2} (5,963 sq mi)		District website
Nzega District	District	492,237	7,864 km^{2} (3,036 sq mi)		District website
Sikonge District	District	202,210	26,283 km^{2} (10,148 sq mi)		District website
Urambo District	District	216,708	5,416 km^{2} (2,091 sq mi)		District website
Uyui District	District	445,852	11,967 km^{2} (4,620 sq mi)		District website
Total		2,576,053	76,150 km^{2} (29,400 sq mi)		Region website

== Coast ==
=== Dar es Salaam Region ===
Dar es Salaam (DSM)
	Type	Population (2016)	Area	City/Town	Website	Mother District
Ilala	DSM	1,528,489	365.0 km^{2} (140.9 sq mi)	Dar es Salaam	District website	Ilala
Kigamboni	DSM	1,510,129	557 km^{2} (215 sq mi)	Dar es Salaam	District website	Temeke
Kinondoni	DSM	1,164,177	327 km^{2} (126 sq mi)	Dar es Salaam	District website	Kinondoni
Temeke	DSM	1,205,949	240 km^{2} (93 sq mi)	Dar es Salaam	District website	Temeke
Ubungo	DSM	1,058,597	260 km^{2} (100 sq mi)	Dar es Salaam	District website	Kinondoni
Total		5,465,420	1,393 km^{2} (538 sq mi)		Region website	

=== Lindi Region ===
Lindi Region
	Type	Population (2016)	Area	City/Town	Website
Lindi City	City	81,839	1,064 km^{2} (411 sq mi)	Lindi	District website
Kilwa District	District	197,998	15,000 km^{2} (5,800 sq mi)		District website
Lindi District	District	201,526	5,975 km^{2} (2,307 sq mi)		District website
Liwale District	District	94,855	34,314 km^{2} (13,249 sq mi)		District website
Nachingwea District	District	185,251	5,975 km^{2} (2,307 sq mi)		District website
Ruangwa District	District	136,065	2,516 km^{2} (971 sq mi)		District website
Total		897,533	66,040 km^{2} (25,500 sq mi)		Region website

=== Morogoro Region ===
Morogoro Region
	Type	Population (2016)	Area	City/Town	Website
Morogoro City	City	347,038	288.4 km^{2} (111.4 sq mi)	Morogoro	District website
Ifakara Urban	Town	106,424	3,893 km^{2} (1,503 sq mi)	Ifakara	District website
Gairo District	District	212,059	1,974 km^{2} (762 sq mi)		District website
Kilombero District	District	448,133	13,546 km^{2} (5,230 sq mi)		District website
Kilosa District	District	481,418	11,774 km^{2} (4,546 sq mi)		District website
Malinyi District	District	125,472			District website
Morogoro District	District	169,740	12,457 km^{2} (4,810 sq mi)		District website
Mvomero District	District	342,911	6,633 km^{2} (2,561 sq mi)		District website
Ulanga District	District	165,903	23,462 km^{2} (9,059 sq mi)		District website
Total		2,437,431	70,624 km^{2} (27,268 sq mi)		Region website

=== Mtwara Region ===
Mtwara Region
	Type	Population (2016)	Area	City/Town	Website
Mtwara City	City	113,732	169.9 km^{2} (65.6 sq mi)	Mtwara	District website
Masasi Urban	Town	94,342	753.3 km^{2} (290.9 sq mi)		District website
Nanyumbu Urban	Town	107,112			District website
Newala Urban	Town	93,728			District website
Masasi District	District	273,940	4,006 km^{2} (1,547 sq mi)		District website
Mtwara District	District	132,329	3,692 km^{2} (1,425 sq mi)		District website
Nanyumbu District	District	158,425	5,204 km^{2} (2,009 sq mi)		District website
Newala District	District	122,072	1,953 km^{2} (754 sq mi)		District website
Tandahimba District	District	238,927	2,049 km^{2} (791 sq mi)		District website
Total		1,334,606	16,710 km^{2} (6,450 sq mi)		Region website

=== Pwani Region ===
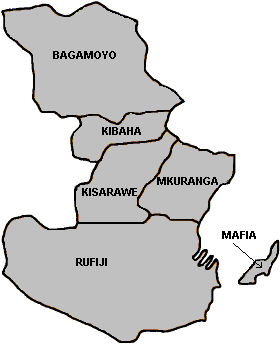
Pwani Region's Districts

Pwani Region
	Type	Population (2016)	Area	City/Town	Website
Kibaha Urban	Town	140,097	705.8 km^{2} (272.5 sq mi)	Kibaha	District website
Bagamoyo District	District	106,484	8,463 km^{2} (3,268 sq mi)		District website
Chalinze District	District	233,423	8,042 km^{2} (3,105 sq mi)		District website
Kibaha District	District	76,552	1,502 km^{2} (580 sq mi)		District website
Kisarawe District	District	110,777	5,028 km^{2} (1,941 sq mi)		District website
Mafia District	District	50,634	642.7 km^{2} (248.1 sq mi)		District website
Mkuranga District	District	243,062	2,827 km^{2} (1,092 sq mi)		District website
Rufiji District	District	236,901	12,752 km^{2} (4,924 sq mi)		District website
Total		1,197,933	32,547 km^{2} (12,566 sq mi)		Region website

== Lake ==
=== Kagera Region ===
Kagera Region's Districts

Kagera Region
	Type	Population (2016)	Area	City/Town	Website
Bukoba City	City	146,169	83.25 km^{2} (32.14 sq mi)	Bukoba	District website
Biharamulo District	District	367,120	7,464 km^{2} (2,882 sq mi)		District website
Bukoba District	District	328,773	1,654 km^{2} (639 sq mi)		District website
Karagwe District	District	376,805	5,134 km^{2} (1,982 sq mi)		District website
Kyerwa District	District	364,328	2,575 km^{2} (994 sq mi)		District website
Missenyi District	District	229,964	2,825 km^{2} (1,091 sq mi)		District website
Muleba District	District	613,190	3,518 km^{2} (1,358 sq mi)		District website
Ngara District	District	363,227	3,305 km^{2} (1,276 sq mi)		District website
Total		2,789,577	25,265 km^{2} (9,755 sq mi)		Region website

=== Kigoma Region ===
Kigoma Region's Districts

Kigoma Region
	Type	Population (2016)	Area	City/Town	Website
Kigoma-Ujiji	City	237,158	92.67 km^{2} (35.78 sq mi)	Kigoma	District website
Kasulu Urban	Town	229,218	911.8 km^{2} (352.0 sq mi)	Kasulu	District website
Buhigwe District	District	279,959	1,506 km^{2} (581 sq mi)		District website
Kakonko District	District	184,431	2,209 km^{2} (853 sq mi)		District website
Kasulu District	District	468,679	7,196 km^{2} (2,778 sq mi)		District website
Kibondo District	District	287,652	13,407 km^{2} (5,176 sq mi)		District website
Kigoma District	District	267,712	967.7 km^{2} (373.6 sq mi)		District website
Uvinza District	District	387,442	10,058 km^{2} (3,883 sq mi)		District website
Total		2,342,250	37,040 km^{2} (14,300 sq mi)		Region website

=== Geita Region ===
Geita Region's Districts

Geita Region
	Type	Population (2016)	Area	City/Town	Website
Geita Urban	Town	192,541		Geita	District website
Bukombe District	District	249,416	8,056 km^{2} (3,110 sq mi)		District website
Chato District	District	405,575	3,074 km^{2} (1,187 sq mi)		District website
Geita District	District	704,542	4,707 km^{2} (1,817 sq mi)		District website
Mbogwe District	District	215,404	2,281 km^{2} (881 sq mi)		District website
Nyang'hwale District	District	164,750	1,607 km^{2} (620 sq mi)		District website
Total		1,932,230	20,054 km^{2} (7,743 sq mi)		Region website

=== Mara Region ===
Mara Region's Districts

Mara Region
	Type	Population (2016)	Area	City/Town	Website
Musoma City	City	148,223	65.05 km^{2} (25.12 sq mi)	Musoma	District website
Bunda Urban	Town	125,751		Bunda	District website
Tarime Urban	Town	75,655		Tarime	District website
Bunda District	District	243,971	3,093 km^{2} (1,194 sq mi)		District website
Butiama District	District	266,739	2,168 km^{2} (837 sq mi)		District website
Musoma District	District	196,807	1,070 km^{2} (410 sq mi)		District website
Rorya District	District	292,680	2,002 km^{2} (773 sq mi)		District website
Serengeti District	District	275,223	11,156 km^{2} (4,307 sq mi)		District website
Tarime District	District	299,180	1,534 km^{2} (592 sq mi)		District website
Total		1,924,230	21,760 km^{2} (8,400 sq mi)		Region website

=== Mwanza Region ===
Mwanza Region's Districts

Mwanza Region
	Type	Population (2016)	Area	City/Town	Website
Mwanza City	City	409,397	182.7 km^{2} (70.5 sq mi)	Mwanza	District website
Ilemela Urban	Town	386,361	254.7 km^{2} (98.3 sq mi)	Ilemela	District website
Buchosa District	District	369,201	4,480 km^{2} (1,730 sq mi)		District website
Kwimba District	District	457,897	3,254 km^{2} (1,256 sq mi)		District website
Magu District	District	337,653	1,530 km^{2} (590 sq mi)		District website
Misungwi District	District	396,055	2,579 km^{2} (996 sq mi)		District website
Sengerema District	District	377,649	3,153 km^{2} (1,217 sq mi)		District website
Ukerewe District	District	388,778	628.1 km^{2} (242.5 sq mi)		District website
Total		3,122,992	9,467 km^{2} (3,655 sq mi)		Region website

=== Shinyanga Region ===
Shinyanga Region's Districts

Shinyanga Region
	Type	Population (2016)	Area	City/Town	Website
Shinyanga City	City	175,245	554.7 km^{2} (214.2 sq mi)	Shinyanga	District website
Kahama City	City	262,999	1,363 km^{2} (526 sq mi)	Kahama	District website
Kishapu District	District	296,423	4,182 km^{2} (1,615 sq mi)		District website
Msalala District	District	272,249			District website
Shinyanga District	District	363,123	3,569 km^{2} (1,378 sq mi)		District website
Ushetu District	District	296,515			District website
Total		1,666,554	18,901 km^{2} (7,298 sq mi)		Region website

=== Simiyu Region ===
Simiyu Region's Districts

Simiyu Region
	Type	Population (2016)	Area	City/Town	Website
Bariadi Urban	Town	167,508		Bariadi	District website
Bariadi District	District	287,714	5,485 km^{2} (2,118 sq mi)		District website
Busega District	District	219,149	1,312 km^{2} (507 sq mi)		District website
Itilima District	District	337,878	4,690 km^{2} (1,810 sq mi)		District website
Maswa District	District	370,412	3,667 km^{2} (1,416 sq mi)		District website
Meatu District	District	322,506	9,017 km^{2} (3,481 sq mi)		District website
Total		1,705,168	25,212 km^{2} (9,734 sq mi)		Region website

== North ==
=== Arusha Region ===
Arusha Region's Districts

Arusha Region
	Type	Population (2016)	Area	City/Town	Website
Arusha City	City	464,701	267.0 km^{2} (103.1 sq mi)	Arusha	District website
Arusha District	District	360,651	1,239 km^{2} (478 sq mi)	Sokon II	District website
Karatu District	District	256,838	3,207 km^{2} (1,238 sq mi)	Karatu	District website
Longido District	District	137,424	7,885 km^{2} (3,044 sq mi)	Longido	District website
Meru District	District	299,218	1,266 km^{2} (489 sq mi)	Usa River	District website
Monduli District	District	177,346	6,993 km^{2} (2,700 sq mi)	Monduli	District website
Ngorongoro District	District	194,474	15,499 km^{2} (5,984 sq mi)	Loliondo	District website
Total		1,890,653	37,576 km^{2} (14,508 sq mi)		Region website

=== Kilimanjaro Region ===
Kilimanjaro Region's Districts

Kilimanjaro Region
	Type	Population (2016)	Area	City/Town	Website
Moshi City	City	197,659	63.39 km^{2} (24.48 sq mi)	Moshi	District website
Hai District	District	225,804	902.3 km^{2} (348.4 sq mi)		District website
Moshi District	District	500,591	1,300 km^{2} (500 sq mi)		District website
Mwanga District	District	140,976	1,831 km^{2} (707 sq mi)		District website
Rombo District	District	279,892	1,471 km^{2} (568 sq mi)		District website
Same District	District	289,377	6,221 km^{2} (2,402 sq mi)		District website
Siha District	District	124,750	1,217 km^{2} (470 sq mi)		District website
Total		1,759,048	13,250 km^{2} (5,120 sq mi)		Region website

=== Manyara Region ===
Manyara Region's Districts

Manyara Region
	Type	Population (2016)	Area	City/Town	Website
Babati Urban	Town	105,710	471.3 km^{2} (182.0 sq mi)	Babati	District website
Mbulu Urban	Town	146,130		Mbulu	District website
Babati District	District	354,674	5,460 km^{2} (2,110 sq mi)		District website
Hanang District	District	313,345	3,636 km^{2} (1,404 sq mi)		District website
Kiteto District	District	277,785	12,945 km^{2} (4,998 sq mi)		District website
Mbulu District	District	217,499	3,800 km^{2} (1,500 sq mi)		District website
Simanjiro District	District	202,879	19,928 km^{2} (7,694 sq mi)		District website
Total		1,618,020	44,522 km^{2} (17,190 sq mi)		Region website

=== Tanga Region ===
Tanga Region
	Type	Population (2016)	Area	City/Town	Website
Tanga City	City	298,842	596.5 km^{2} (230.3 sq mi)	Tanga	District website
Handeni Urban	Town	86,434	837.4 km^{2} (323.3 sq mi)	Handeni	District website
Korogwe Urban	Town	74,683	225.3 km^{2} (87.0 sq mi)	Korogwe	District website
Bumbuli District	District	174,938			
Handeni District	District	302,466	6,529 km^{2} (2,521 sq mi)		District website
Kilindi District	District	258,937	6,444 km^{2} (2,488 sq mi)		District website
Korogwe District	District	264,628	3,203 km^{2} (1,237 sq mi)		District website
Lushoto District	District	363,463	4,092 km^{2} (1,580 sq mi)		District website
Mkinga District	District	129,084	2,712 km^{2} (1,047 sq mi)		District website
Muheza District	District	223,544	1,498 km^{2} (578 sq mi)		District website
Pangani District	District	59,067	1,756 km^{2} (678 sq mi)		District website
Total		2,236,086	26,677 km^{2} (10,300 sq mi)		Region website

== South ==
=== Iringa Region ===
Iringa Region
	Type	Population (2016)	Area	City/Town	Website
Iringa City	City	158,363	369.1 km^{2} (142.5 sq mi)	Iringa	District website
Mafinga Urban	Town	74,963	572.5 km^{2} (221.0 sq mi)	Mafinga	District website
Iringa District	District	265,811	18,786 km^{2} (7,253 sq mi)		District website
Kilolo District	District	228,244	9,244 km^{2} (3,569 sq mi)		District website
Mufindi District	District	257,501	7,515 km^{2} (2,902 sq mi)		District website
Total		984,882	35,503 km^{2} (13,708 sq mi)		Region website

=== Katavi Region ===
Katavi Region
	Type	Population (2016)	Area	City/Town	Website
Mpanda Urban	Town	117,109	318.4 km^{2} (122.9 sq mi)	Mpanda	District website
Mlele District	District	46,019	30,787 km^{2} (11,887 sq mi)		District website
Mpanda District	District	203,872	16,942 km^{2} (6,541 sq mi)		District website
Mpimbwe District	District	117,934			District website
Nsimbo District	District	157,633			District website
Total		642,567	45,843 km^{2} (17,700 sq mi)		Region website

=== Mbeya Region ===
Mbeya Region
	Type	Population (2016)	Area	City/Town	Website
Mbeya City	City	424,623	252.5 km^{2} (97.5 sq mi)	Mbeya	District website
Busokelo District	District	106,187			District website
Chunya District	District	172,797	17,505 km^{2} (6,759 sq mi)		District website
Kyela District	District	244,108	755.9 km^{2} (291.9 sq mi)		District website
Mbarali District	District	331,206	14,439 km^{2} (5,575 sq mi)		District website
Mbeya District	District	336,498	2,813 km^{2} (1,086 sq mi)		District website
Rungwe District	District	267,605	2,155 km^{2} (832 sq mi)		District website
Total		1,883,024	37,700 km^{2} (14,600 sq mi)		Region website

=== Njombe Region ===
Njombe Region
	Type	Population (2016)	Area	City/Town	Website
Njombe Urban	Town	134,429	3,542 km^{2} (1,368 sq mi)	Njombe	District website
Makambako Urban	Town	96,857	883.5 km^{2} (341.1 sq mi)	Makambako	District website
Ludewa District	District	137,520	6,243 km^{2} (2,410 sq mi)		District website
Makete District	District	100,407	3,996 km^{2} (1,543 sq mi)		District website
Njombe Rural District	District	88,516	3,448 km^{2} (1,331 sq mi)		District website
Wanging'ombe District	District	167,042	3,441 km^{2} (1,329 sq mi)		District website
Total		724,772	21,347 km^{2} (8,242 sq mi)		Region website

=== Rukwa Region ===
Rukwa Region
	Type	Population (2016)	Area	City/Town	Website
Sumbawanga City	City	238,491	1,374 km^{2} (531 sq mi)	Sumbawanga	District website
Kalambo District	District	236,112	5,579 km^{2} (2,154 sq mi)		District website
Nkasi District	District	319,666	9,824 km^{2} (3,793 sq mi)		District website
Sumbawanga District	District	238,491	5,226 km^{2} (2,018 sq mi)		District website
Total		1,141,953	22,792 km^{2} (8,800 sq mi)		Region website

=== Ruvuma Region ===
Ruvuma Region
	Type	Population (2016)	Area	City/Town	Website
Songea City	City	221,313	596.2 km^{2} (230.2 sq mi)	Songea	District website
Mbinga Urban	Town	140,747		Mbinga	District website
Madaba District	District	52,005			District website
Mbinga District	District	244,256	4,840 km^{2} (1,870 sq mi)		District website
Namtumbo District	District	219,495	21,765 km^{2} (8,404 sq mi)		District website
Nyasa District	District	159,103	3,660 km^{2} (1,410 sq mi)		District website
Songea District	District	137,209	14,027 km^{2} (5,416 sq mi)		District website
Tunduru District	District	324,693	18,414 km^{2} (7,110 sq mi)		District website
Total		1,498,821	63,669 km^{2} (24,583 sq mi)		Region website

=== Songwe Region ===
Songwe Region
	Type	Population (2016)	Area	City/Town	Website
Tunduma Urban	Town	142,943	87.47 km^{2} (33.77 sq mi)	Tunduma	District website
Ileje District	District	141,589	1,880 km^{2} (730 sq mi)		District website
Mbozi District	District	507,804	3,858 km^{2} (1,490 sq mi)		District website
Momba District	District	191,976	4,818 km^{2} (1,860 sq mi)		District website
Songwe District	District	152,103	11,164 km^{2} (4,310 sq mi)		District website
Total		1,136,415	22,600 km^{2} (8,700 sq mi)		Region website

== Zanzibar ==
=== Mjini Magharibi Region ===
Mjini Magharibi
	Type	Population (2016)	Area	City/Town	Website
Zanzibar City	City				District website
Zanzibar West District	District				District website
Total		999			Region website

=== Zanzibar North Region ===
Kaskazini Unguja
	Type	Population (2016)	Area	City/Town	Website
Kaskazini A	District				District website
Kaskazini B	District				District website
Total		999			Region website

=== Unguja South Region ===
Kusini Unguja
	Type	Population (2016)	Area	City/Town	Website
Kati District	District				District website
Kusini District	District				District website
Total		999			Region website

=== Pemba North Region ===
Kaskazini Pemba
	Type	Population (2016)	Area	City/Town	Website
Micheweni District	District				District website
Wete District	District				District website
Total		999			Region website

=== Pemba South Region ===
Kusini Pemba
	Type	Population (2016)	Area	City/Town	Website
Chake Chake District	District				District website
Mkoani District	District				District website
Total		999			Region website

== See also ==
- Regions of Tanzania
