= Mtwara Region =

Region of Tanzania

Mtwara Region Mkoa wa Mtwara (Swahili)
- Region
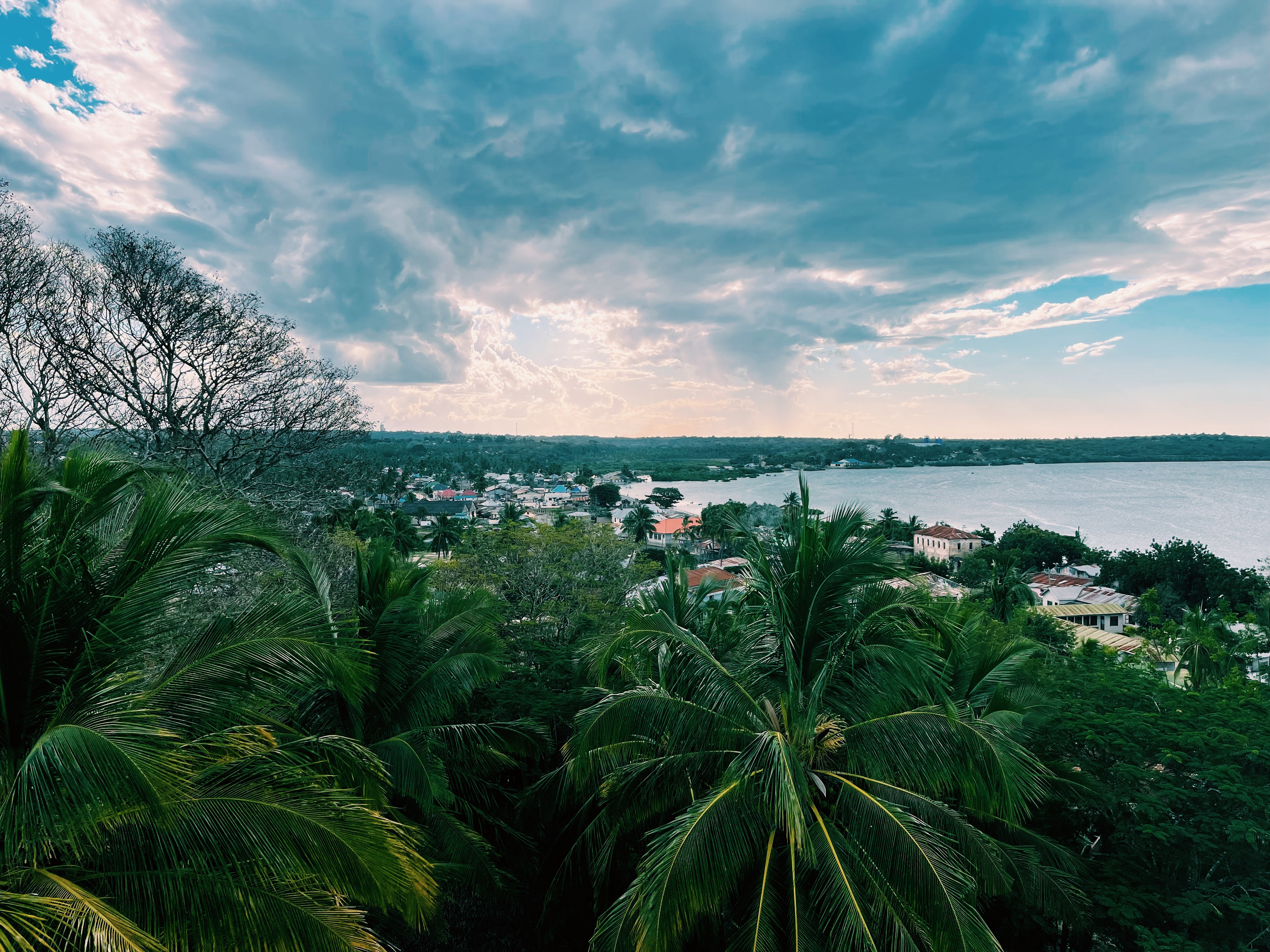
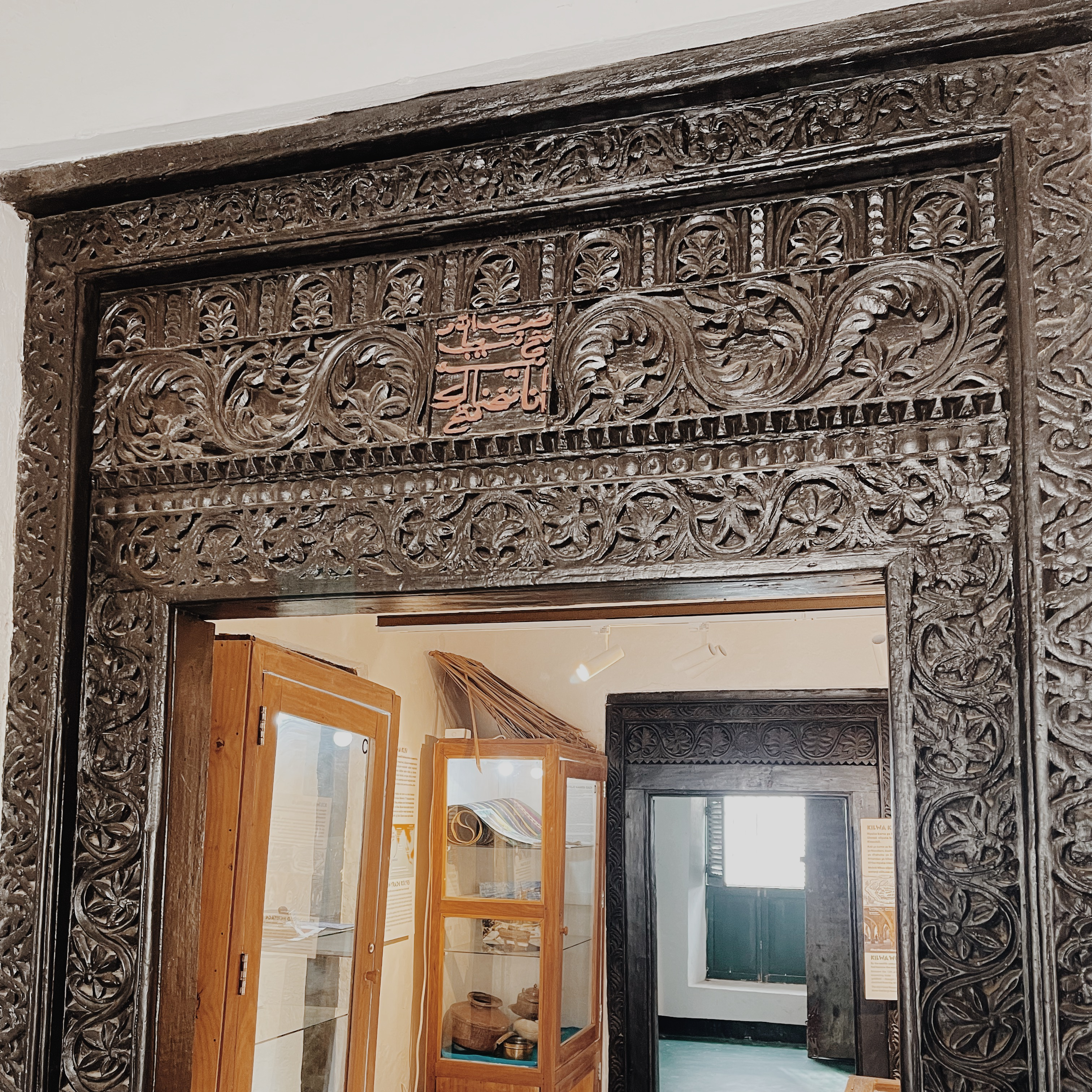
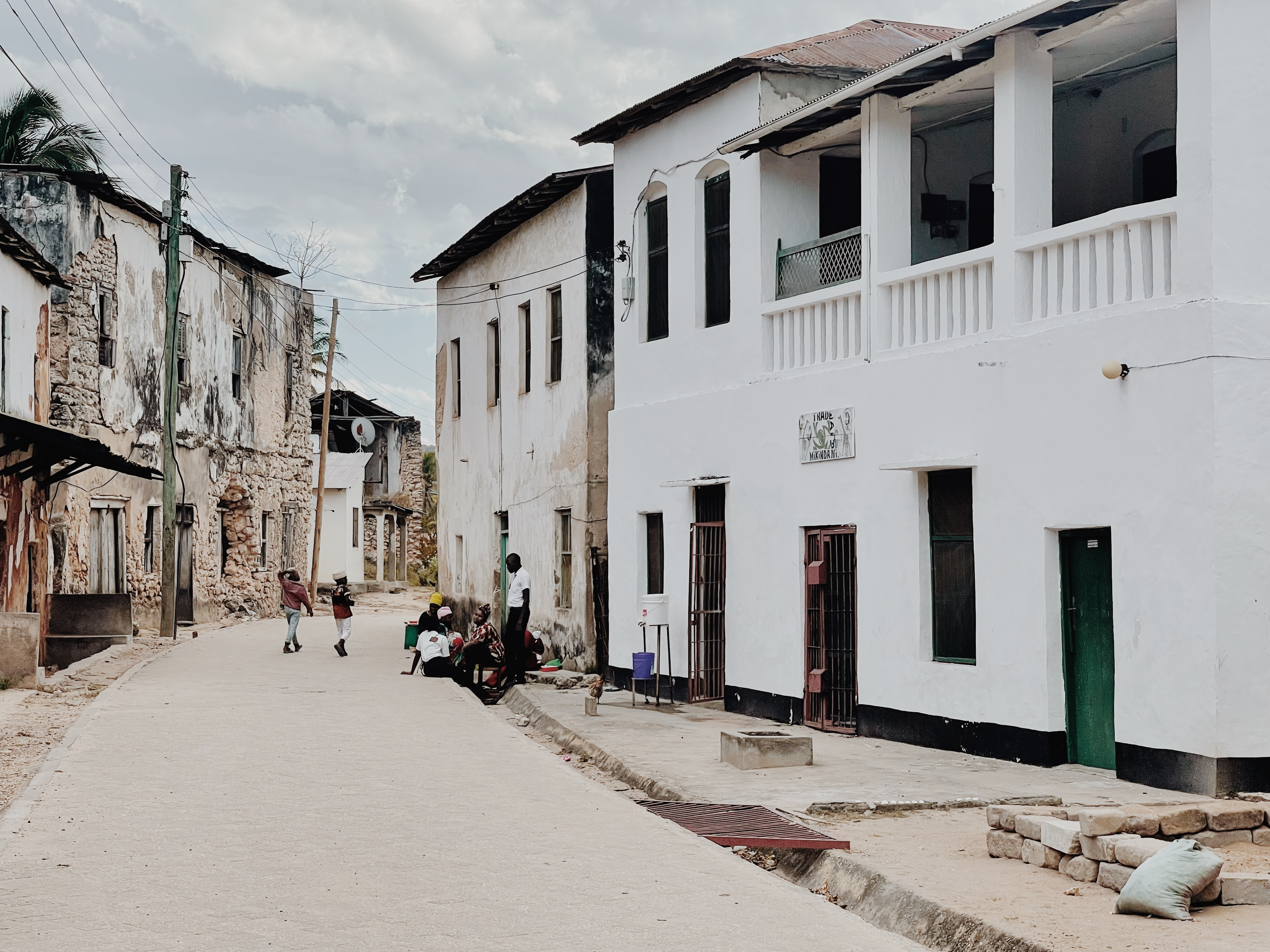
- From top to bottom: Bird's eye view of Mikindani Bay, Swahili Door in Mtwara and historic Mikindani

- Mtwara Region in Tanzania
- Coordinates: 10°38′30.12″S 39°14′15.36″E
- Country: Tanzania
- Zone: Coastal
- Administrative Region: 1971
- Named for: The port of Mtwara
- Capital: Mtwara
- Districts: List: Mtwara-Mikindani District; Masasi Urban District; Nanyamba Town; Newala Town; Masasi District; Mtwara Rural; Nanyumbu District; Newala District; Tandahimba District

Government
  - Regional Commissioner: Ahmed Abbas Ahmed

Area
  - Total: 16,710 km^{2} (6,450 sq mi)
  - Rank: 23rd of 31
- Highest elevation (Masasi Hill): 837 m (2,746 ft)

Population (2022)
  - Total: 1,634,947
  - Rank: 20th of 31
  - Density: 97.84/km^{2} (253.4/sq mi)
- Demonym: Mtwaran

Ethnic groups
  - Settler: Swahili
  - Native: Makonde, Yao & Makua
- Time zone: UTC+3 (EAT)
- Postcode: 21xxx
- Area code: 023
- ISO 3166 code: TZ-17
- HDI (2018): 0.507 low· 22nd of 25
- Website: Official website
- Symbols of Tanzania
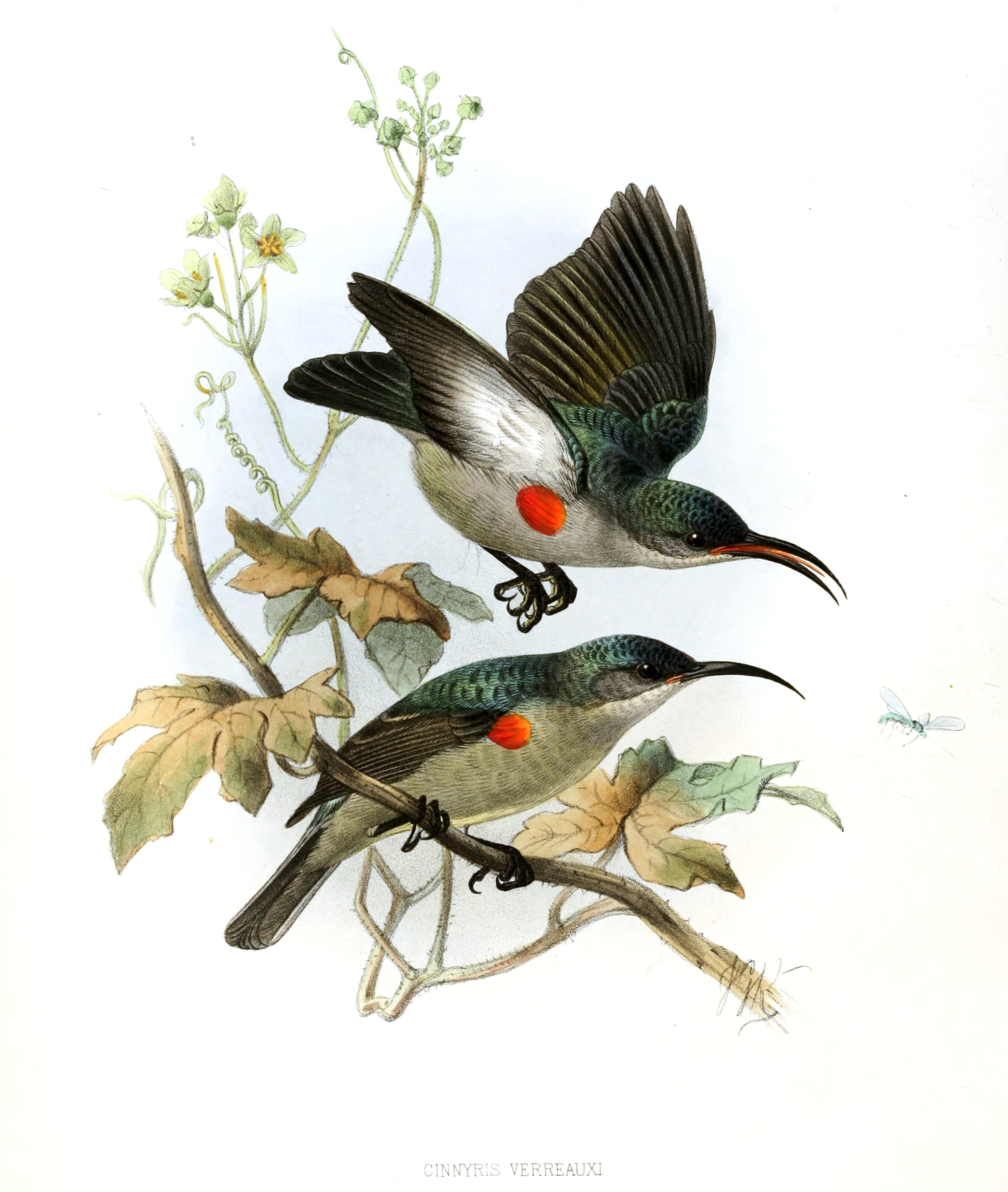
- Bird: Gray sunbird

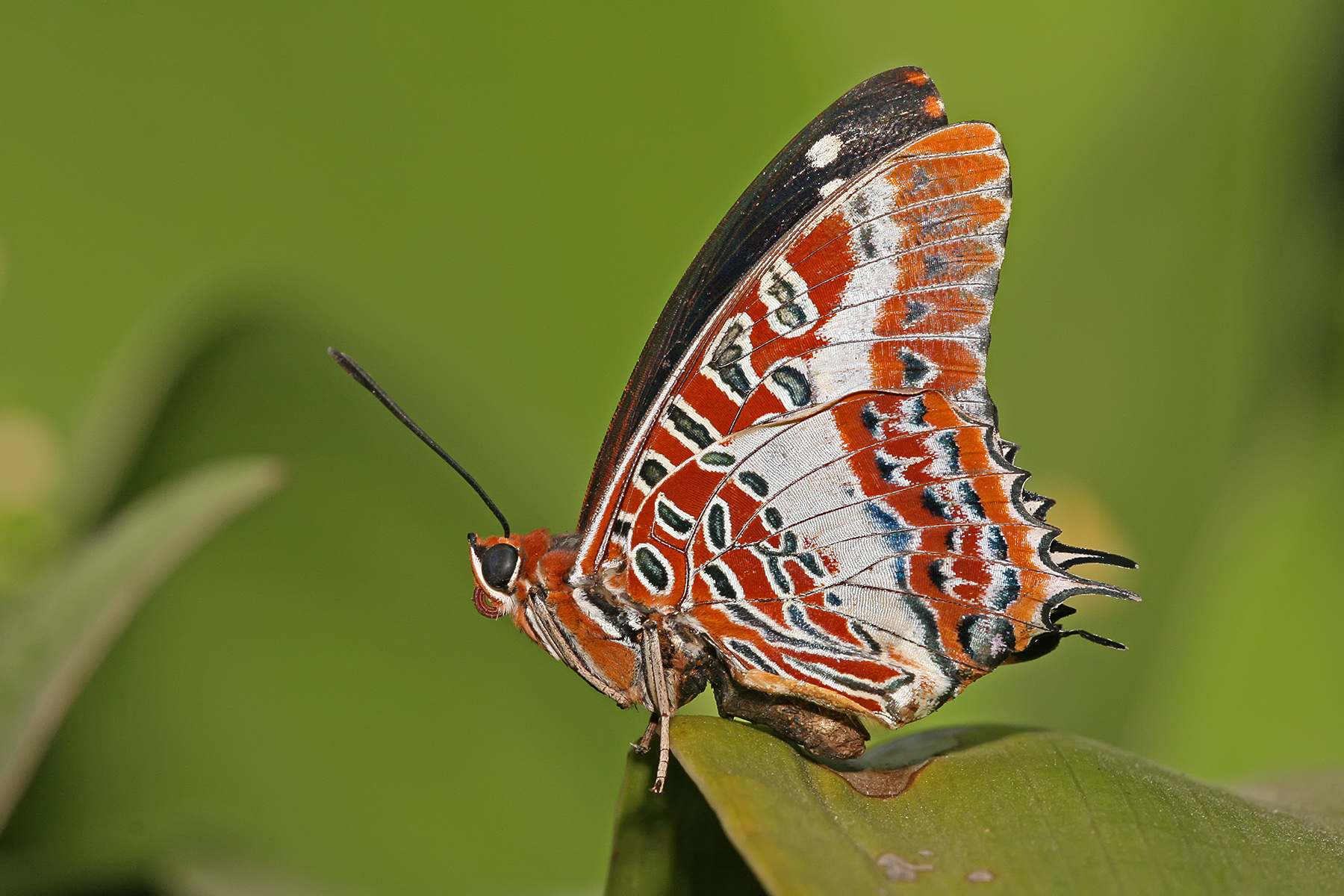
- Butterfly: White-barred emperor

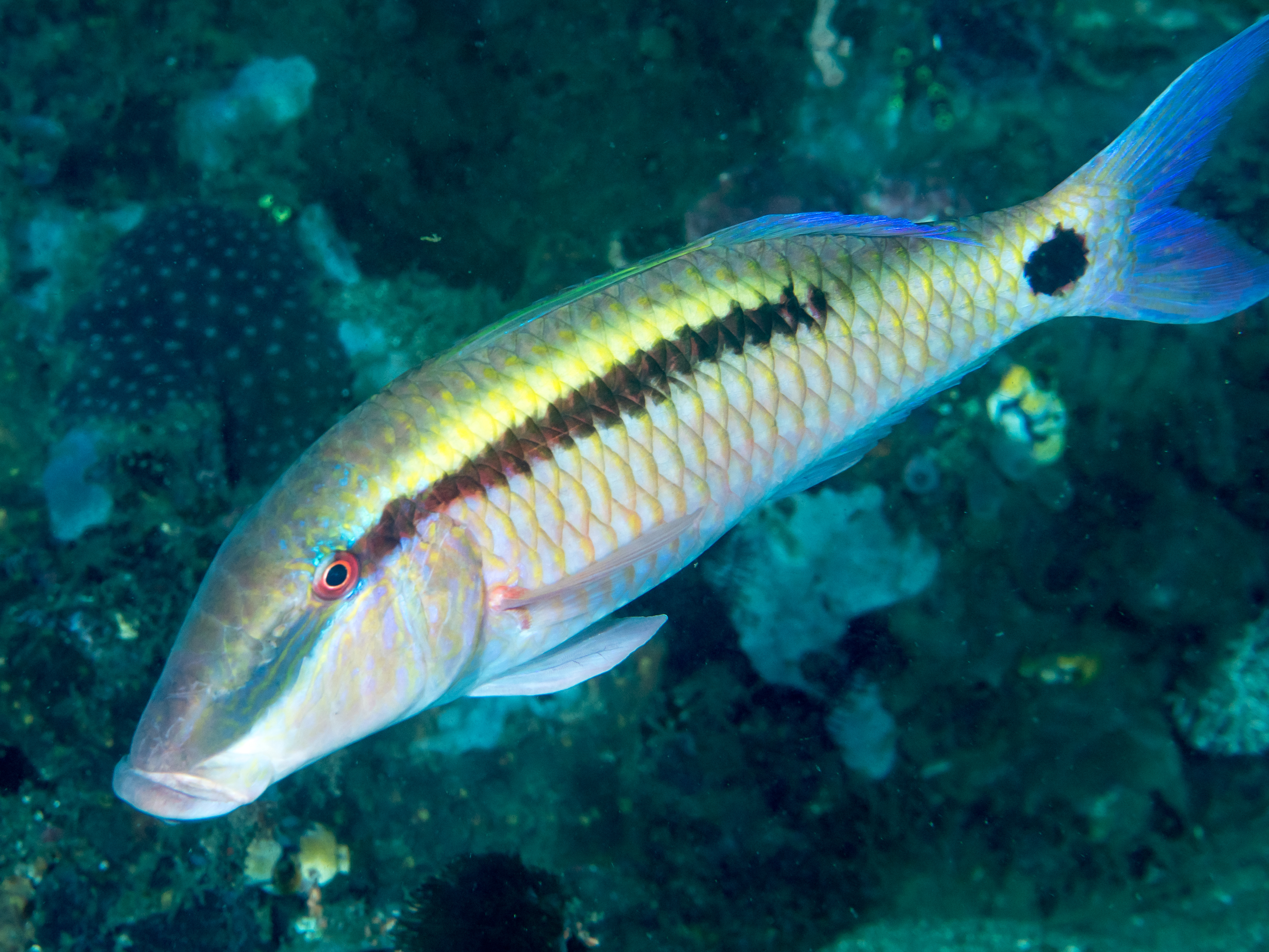
- Fish: Dash-and-dot goatfish

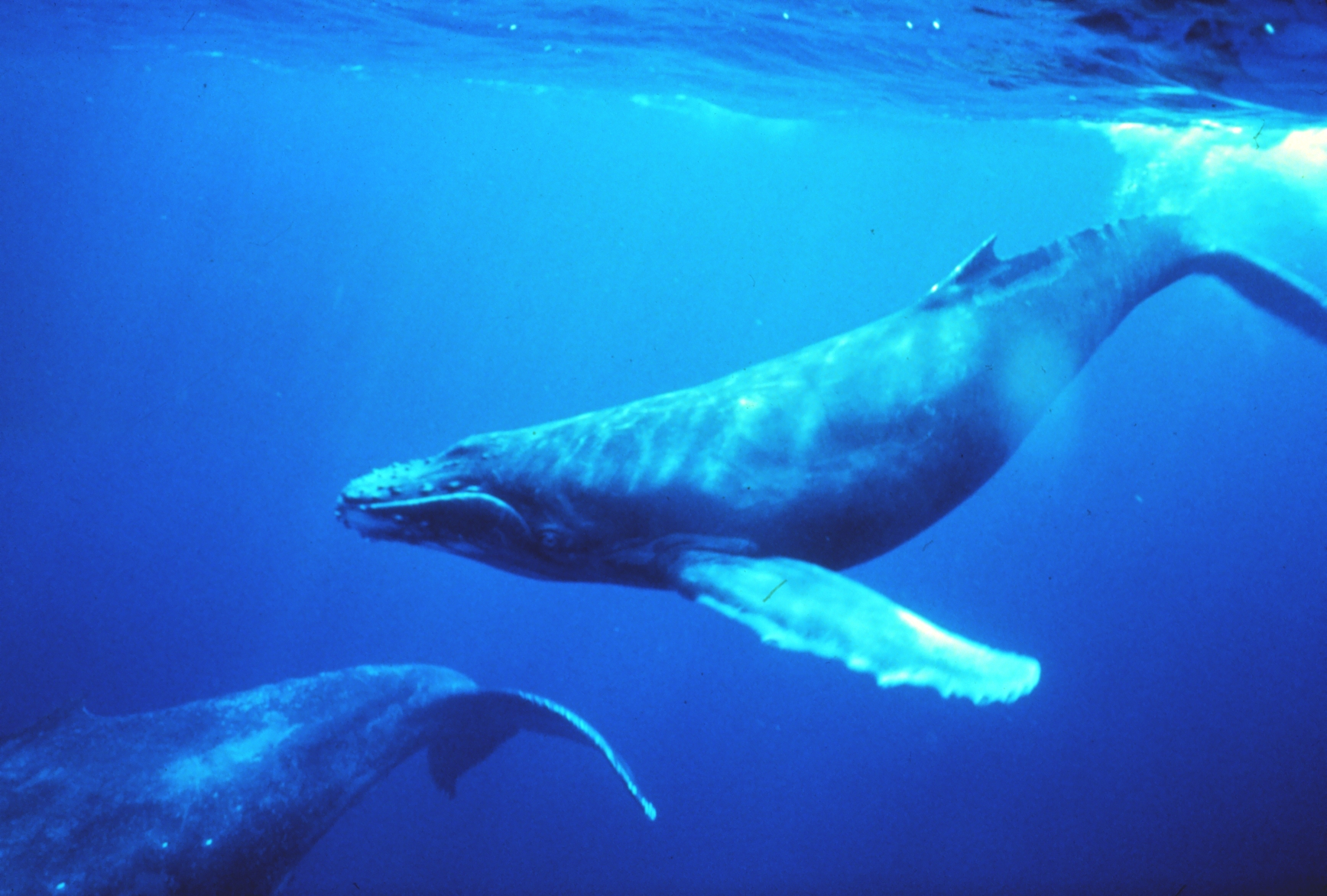
- Mammal: Humpback whale

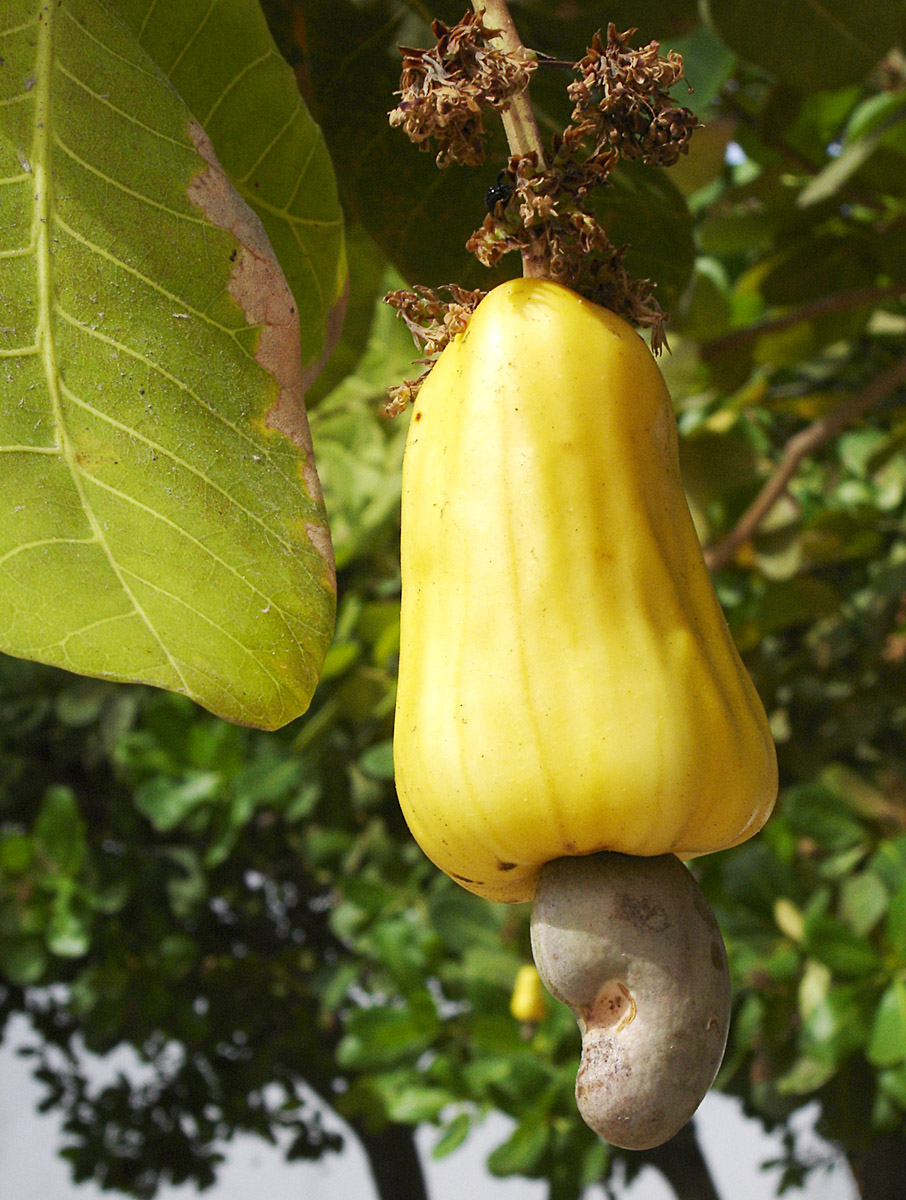
- Tree: Cashew

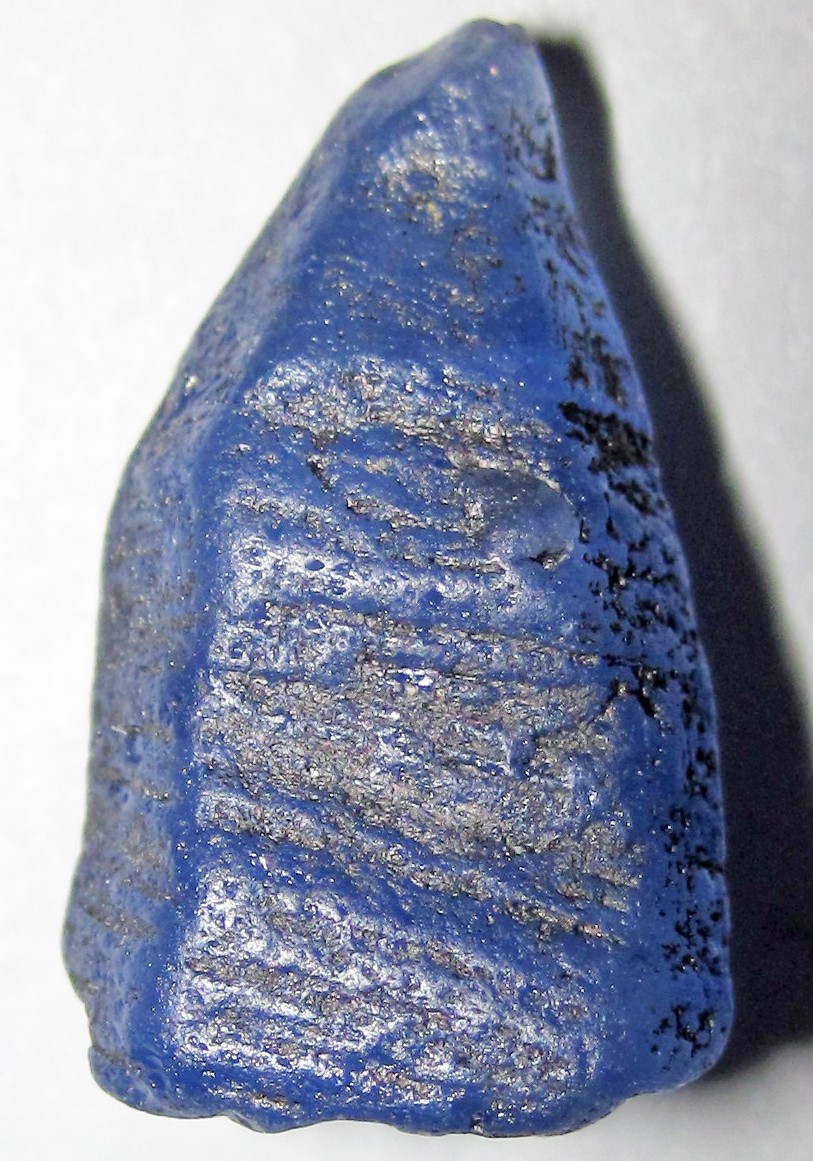
- Mineral: Sapphire

Mtwara Region (Swahili: Mkoa wa Mtwara) is one of Tanzania's 31 administrative regions, with its capital as the municipality of Mtwara. Mtwara Region is home to one of the most influential peoples in Tanzania, the Makonde. Mtwara is home to Tanzania's 3rd president Benjamin Mkapa and is home to a number of influential artists. The boundary with Mozambique to the south is formed by the Ruvuma River. To the west, Mtwara is bordered by Ruvuma Region, to the north by Lindi Region, and to the east is the Indian Ocean.

Mtwara Region is known for being the nation's largest producer of cashew nuts. According to the 2012 national census, the region had a population of 1,270,854, which was lower than the pre-census projection of 1,374,767. For 2002-2012, the region's 1.2 percent average annual population growth rate was the 26th highest in the country. It was also the fourteenth most densely populated region with 76 people per square kilometer.

== Population ==
The native peoples of the Mtwara Region are the Makonde, the Yao and the Makua. The Makonde are the dominant ethnic group in Mtwara Region and are native to east and central Mtwara, specifically in Mtwara-Mikindani District, Mtwara District, Newala, and Tandahimba districts. As of 1967, the Makonde made up 60% of the region. The second-largest group in terms of the territory is the Makua people, who are native to Nanyumbu and Masasi Districts. The Yao are native to parts of Tandahimba District. Since 1988, the region has been facing mass migration as younger people seek economic opportunities in Dar es Salaam creating a vibrant Makonde community in Temeke District of Dar es Dalaam especially in Mbagala, which is named after the Mbagala River located in Mtwara Region.

== History ==
=== Groundnut scheme during the British colonial occupation ===
In 1948, the British Government formulated the "Tanganyika groundnut scheme" through the Overseas Food Corporation (OFC). The purpose was to alleviate the worldwide shortage of vegetable oils. However, inadequate research and adverse environmental conditions due to poor planning resulted in the complete and disastrous failure of the scheme. In this region, the exported crop was to go through the port of Mtwara. This port was created for the scheme; it was linked to the growing areas near Nachingwea by a new railway.

Mtwara was part of Lindi Region until 1971.

== Geography ==
Mtwara is both the most eastern and southern region in the country. The region is located between 10 and 11 degrees south of the Equator. Mtwara is the third smallest region after Dar es Salaam Region and Kilimanjaro Region at 16,710 km^{2} (6,450 sq mi), only occupying about 1.9% of the country. In comparison, Mtwara is slightly smaller than the African nation of Eswatini at 17,230 square kilometers. Mtwara's central area is of high elevation, home to the Makonde plateau with Mtwara Region's highest point being Masasi peak at 837 meters above sea level. The largest and longest river in Mtwara Region is the Ruvuma River which is fed by the Mbangala River within the region as one of Ruvuma's many tributaries.

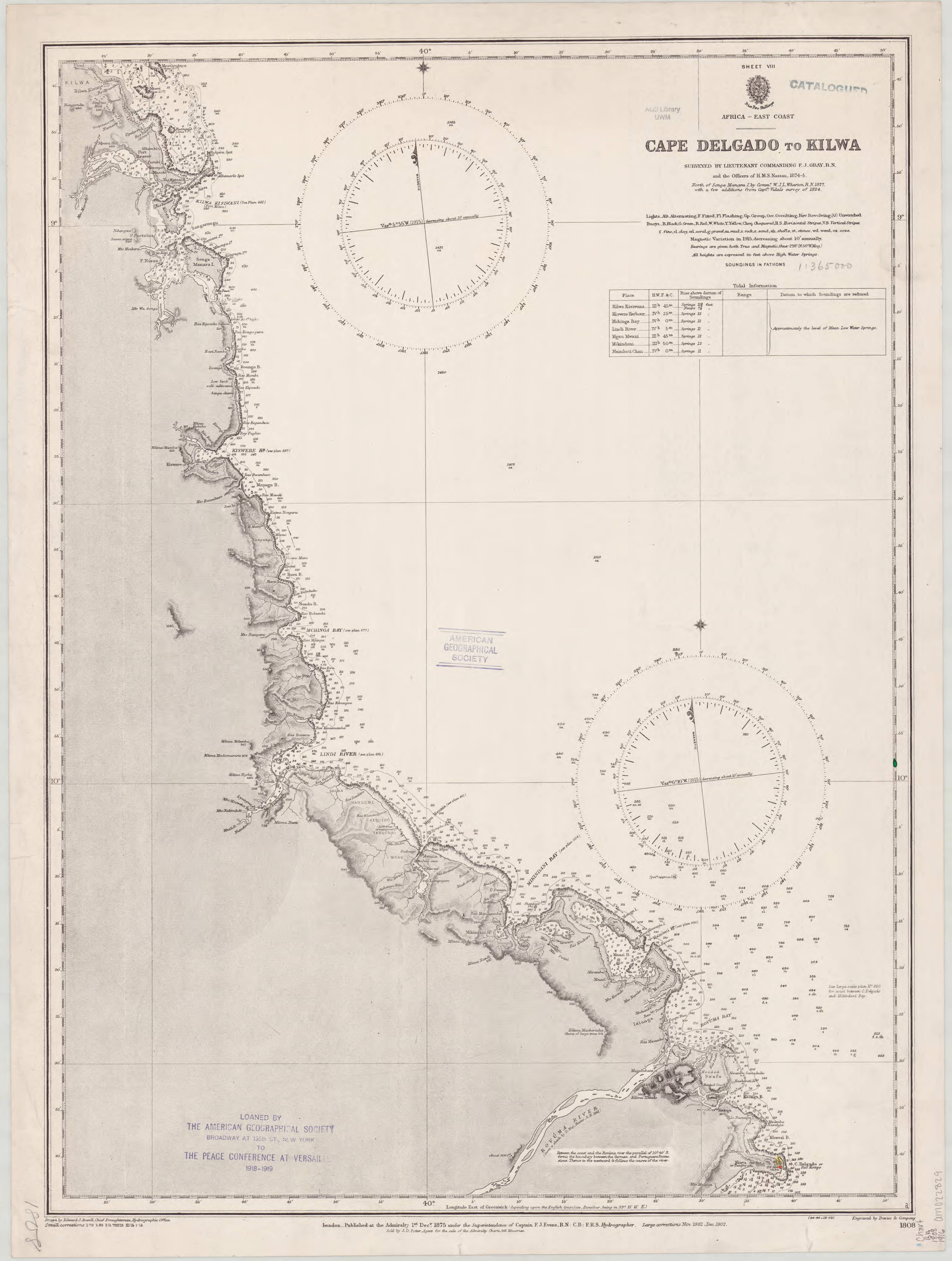
Admiralty Chart No 1808 Africa east coast Cape Delgado to Kilwa, showing the coast of Mtwara in between, Published1875

=== Climate ===
The rainy season, which runs from November/December to April/May, has only one peak. The storm's peak typically occurs in January, but may also occur in February or March. The overall amount of annual precipitation varies with altitude. Rainfall in the Mtwara district ranges from 935 mm to 1160 mm in the highlands and plateau. At Masasi Mission, the rainfall is 893 mm, whereas at Newala, it is 1001 mm. It also ranges between Mtopwa and Lukwika Mission, ranging from 1133 mm to 832 mm. Similarly, the highest monthly mean temperature at Mtwara on the seashore in December is 27 degrees Celsius, while the lowest monthly mean temperature is 23 degrees Celsius in July. In Mtwara, relative humidity ranges from 87 percent in March to 79 percent in October. Inland, temperatures and humidity are lower.

=== Geology ===
Soils are determined by geology. There are two geological zones in the region, resulting in two geologically determined soil types. The first zone is the coastal sedimentary deposit, which stretches 31-125 kilometers from the Indian Ocean to the tip of Newala's Makonde Plateau. Deep, well-drained, sandy soils with poor fertility and moisture holding capacity are produced in this zone. Sandstones are used to make them. Marine heavy clay soils, also known as vertisols, are found in some regions. Coastal limestones also provide red, well-drained soils with a thick texture. The second zone extends west of the coastal sediments geologically. Gneisses and granulites make up this zone of pre-cambrian basement rocks. The soils in this basement are diverse. To the north of Masasi town, there are deep, well-drained red clays. These are the best soils in the area since they are most suited to the region's upland crops. Course-grained sandy soils are common south of Masasi.

The region is separated into two sections in terms of topography. The coastal plain's landforms are complicated. Second, at 300mm to 400mm, the Makonde Plateau dominates the basement plain. It's mostly low-lying, with scattered rocky outcroppings and steep riverbanks. The western part, which is beyond the Makonde Plateau, flows to the south via the Ruvuma River's tributaries. The Makonde Plateau is drained by the Maombi and Mbuo rivers.

== Economy ==
Mtwara, like the rest of Tanzania, is mostly a farming community. Farming is the main source of income for the region's residents. Agribusiness employs over 92 percent of the population, in addition to other rural activities such as fishing, beekeeping, and small-scale manufacturing. Arable land makes up about 85 percent of the region's total area. However, only about a quarter of this is cultivated. The average farm size per rural home (169,482 households - 1988 Census) is projected to be 1.5 ha, with an average of 4.4 people.

Mechanization and oxenization of farms are still developing. In this area, the hand hoe is the most popular agricultural implement. Cassava, millet, and sorghum are all important food crops, with maize only recently gaining popularity. The most important cash crop in the area is cashew nuts, followed by groundnuts and sesame. Because livestock rearing is not a common practice among the people of the region, its economic contribution is negligible. The cashew nut crop, which accounts for about 25% of the region's GDP, is one of Mtwara's significant contributors. The Mtwara Region produces 40% of the country's cashew nut production. Tanzanian cashew nut production is mostly for export and predictably, only a small portion of the yield is consumed. The Mtwara Region is officially recognized as the country's leading cashew nut grower, producing roughly half of the country's output. Newala district produces more over half of the region's cashewnut harvest. Masasi comes in second with a 29 percent contribution, and Mtwara district comes in last with a 19 percent average contribution.

The mining industry in the region has a bright future. On a limited scale, 35 minerals have been discovered and mined. The Masasi District has been mining sapphire, christalbella, alexandrite, tourmaline, and rhodolite since 1995.

=== National Parks and Forest Reserves ===
Mtwara Region is home to the Mnazi Bay-Ruvuma Estuary Marine Park that is one of the largest marine parks in the country. The marine park is a sanctuary for breeding Humpback whales. Forest reserves occupy about 8.33 percent of the region's 1,672,000 ha of land. This area is 139,295 hectares. Masasi district has the greatest amount of forest cover in the region. The central government manages 130,545 hectares of forest reserves. This equates to 93.7 percent. District councils possess another 8,749 hectares, or 6.3 percent of total forest reserves. In total, there are 16 forest reserves in the region. The majority of them are located in the Masasi district.

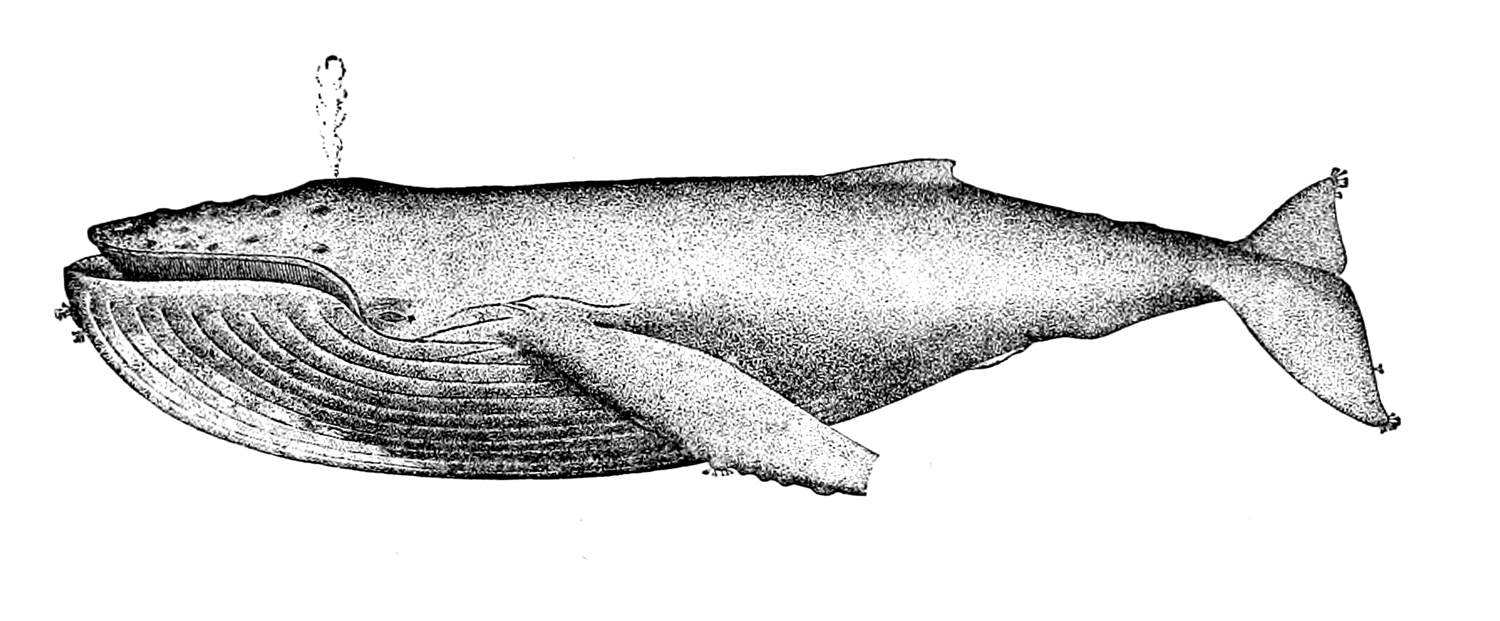
Humpback whale illustration

== Administrative divisions ==
=== Districts ===
Mtwara Region is divided into two towns (Mtwara Municipal and Masasi Town) and seven districts, each administered by a council:

Districts of Mtwara Region
Map	District	Population (2016)
	Mtwara Mikindani	113,732
	Masasi Town	94,342
	Nanyamba Town	107,112
	Newala Town	93,728
	Masasi District	273,940
	Mtwara District	132,329
	Nanyumbu District	158,425
	Newala District	122,072
	Tandahimba District	238,927
Total		1,334,606

== Notable people ==
- Benjamin Mkapa, former Tanzanian president
- Harmonize, Tanzanian musician
- A.Y, Tanzanian rapper
- Hasnain Murji, former member of parliament of Tanzania
