= List of current members of the Tanzanian Parliament =

403 individuals serve in the National Assembly of Tanzania.

== Members of Parliament ==
Name	Constituency	Party
Tarimba Gulam Abbas	Kinondoni	CCM
Sagini Jumanne Abdallah	Butiama	CCM
Hamida Mohamedi Abdallah	Lindi City	CCM
Maida Hamad Abdallah	Reserved	CCM
Ahmed Yahya Abdulwakil	Kwahani	CCM
Abdulaziz Mohamed Abood	Morogoro City	CCM
Khadija Hassan Aboud	Reserved	CCM
Tulia Ackson	Mbeya City	CCM
Stella Ikupa Alex	Reserved	CCM
Mohammed Maulid Ali	Kiembesamaki	CCM
Khamis Kassim Ali	Mgogoni	CCM
Maulid Saleh Ali	Welezo	CCM
Hussein Nassor Amar	Nyang'hwale	CCM
Ameir Abdalla Ameir	Zanzibar	CCM
Wanu Hafidh Ameir	Reserved	CCM
Jeremiah Mrimi Amsabi	Serengeti	CCM
Abubakar Damian Asenga	Kilombero	CCM
Jumaa Hamidu Aweso	Pangani	CCM
Bakar Hamad Bakar	Zanzibar	CCM
Hussein Mohamed Bashe	Nzega City	CCM
Innocent Lugha Bashungwa	Karagwe	CCM
Nashon William Bidyanguze	Kigoma South	CCM
Innocent Sebba Bilakwate	Kyerwa	CCM
Doto Mashaka Biteko	Bukombe	CCM
Ester Amos Bulaya	Reserved	CHADEMA
Zuena Athumani Bushiri	Reserved	CCM
Rose Vicent Busiga	Reserved	CCM
Boniphace Nyangindu Butondo	Kishapu	CCM
Stephen Lujwahuka Byabato	Bukoba City	CCM
Josephine Tabitha Chagulla	Reserved	CCM
Hawa Mchafu Chakoma	Reserved	CCM
Leonard Madaraka Chamuriho	Nominated	CCM
Pindi Hazara Chana	Reserved	CCM
Hamad Hassan Chande	Kojani	CCM
Abdallah Jafari Chaurembo	Mbagala	CCM
Pius Stephen Chaya	Manyoni East	CCM
Abdallah Dadi Chikota	Nanyamba	CCM
Amandus Julius Chinguile	Nachingwea	CCM
Ezra John Chiwelesa	Biharamulo West	CCM
Ghati Zephania Chomete	Reserved	CCM
Cosato David Chumi	Mafinga City	CCM
David Mathayo David	Same Magharibi	CCM
Kiswaga Boniventura Destery	Magu	CCM
Festo John Dugange	Wanging'ombe	CCM
Ravia Idarus Faina	Makunduchi	CCM
Kavejuru Eliadory Felix	Buhigwe	CCM
Stella Simon Fiyao	Reserved	CHADEMA
Suma Ikenda Fyandomo	Reserved	CCM
Mrisho Mashaka Gambo	Arusha City	CCM
Pauline Philipo Gekul	Babati City	CCM
Josephine Johnson Genzabuke	Reserved	CCM
Boniphace Mwita Getere	Bunda	CCM
Najma Murtaza Giga	Reserved	CCM
Seif Khamis Said Gulamali	Manonga	CCM
Josephat Mathias Gwajima	Kawe	CCM
Dorothy Onesphoro Gwajima	Nominated	CCM
Martha Nehemia Gwau	Reserved	CCM
Haji Amour Haji	Makunduchi	CCM
Kassim Hassan Haji	Mwanakwerekwe	CCM
Zahor Mohamed Haji	Mwera	CCM
Mwantum Dau Haji	Reserved	CCM
Asia Abdulkarim Halamga	Reserved	CCM
Juma Usonge Hamad	Chaani	CCM
Nusrat Shaaban Hanje	Reserved	CHADEMA
Salim Alaudin Hasham	Ulanga	CCM
Amina Daud Hassan	Reserved	CCM
Japhet Ngailonga Hasunga (CPA)	Vwawa	CCM
Samweli Xaday Hhayuma	Hanang'	CCM
Juma Othman Hija	Tumbatu	CCM
Aeshi Khalfan Hilaly	Sumbawanga City	CCM
Mansoor Shanif Hirani	Kwimba	CCM
Agnes Elias Hokororo	Reserved	CCM
Augustine Vuma Holle	Kasulu Rural	CCM
Saada Mansour Hussein	Reserved	CCM
Iddi Kassim Iddi	Msalala	CCM
Christine Gabriel Ishengoma	Reserved	CCM
Khalifa Mohammed Issa	Mtambwe	ACT
Selemani Said Jafo	Kisarawe	CCM
Janejelly Ntate James	Reserved	CCM
Mwantakaje Haji Juma	Bububu	CCM
Abdulhafar Idrissa Juma	Kiwengwa	CCM
Asha Abdullah Juma	Reserved	CCM
Soud Mohammed Jumah	Donge	CCM
Ally Anyigulile Jumbe	Kyela	CCM
Jaffar Sanya Jussa	Paje	CCM
Latifa Khamis Juwakali	Reserved	CCM
Ritta Enespher Kabati	Reserved	CCM
Naghenjwa Livingstone Kaboyoka	Reserved	CHADEMA
Palamagamba John Aidan Mwaluko Kabudi	Kilosa	CCM
Alice Karungi Kaijage	Reserved	CCM
Jacquline Andrew Kainja	Urambo	CCM
Agnesta Lambert Kaiza	Reserved	CHADEMA
Charles Muguta Kajege	Mwibara	CCM
Selemani Moshi Kakoso	Mpanda Rural	CCM
Joseph George Kakunda	Sikonge	CCM
Amb. Bashiru Ally Kakurwa	Nominated	CCM
Medard Matogolo Kalemani	Chato	CCM
Innocent Edward Kalogeris	Morogoro Kusini	CCM
Aloyce John Kamamba	Buyungu	CCM
Ng'wasi Damas Kamani	Reserved	CCM
Aleksia Asia Kamguna	Reserved	CCM
Bonnah Ladislaus Kamoli	Segerea	CCM
Joseph Zacharius Kamonga	Ludewa	CCM
Isack Aloyce Kamwelwe	Katavi	CCM
Josephat Sinkamba Kandege	Kalambo	CCM
Constantine John Kanyasu	Geita City	CCM
Benaya Liuka Kapinga	Mbinga Rural	CCM
Judith Salvio Kapinga	Reserved	CCM
Sebastian Simon Kapufi	Mpanda City	CCM
Masache Njelu Kasaka	Lupa	CCM
Godfrey Msongwe Kasekenya	Ileje	CCM
Ally Mohamed Kassinge	Kilwa Kusini	CCM
Katani Ahmadi Katani	Tandahimba	CCM
Zainab Athuman Katimba	Reserved	CCM
Vita Rashid Kawawa	Namtumbo	CCM
Michael Mwita Kembaki	Tarime City	CCM
Yahya Ali Khamis	Kijini	CCM
Khamis Hamza Khamis	Uzini	CCM
Mwantatu Mbarak Khamis	Zanzibar	CCM
Mwanaidi Ali Khamis	Reserved	CCM
Fakharia Shomar Khamis	Reserved	CCM
Mbarouk Juma Khatib	Bumbwini	CCM
Munira Mustafa Khatib	Reserved	CCM
Aida Joseph Khenani	Nkasi Kaskazini	CHADEMA
Exaud Silaoneka Kigahe	Mufindi Kaskazini	CCM
Omari Mohamed Kigua	Kilindi	CCM
Hamisi Andrea Kigwangalla	Nzega Rural	CCM
David Mwakiposa Kihenzile	Mufindi Kusini	CCM
Ashatu Kachwamba Kijaji	Kondoa	CCM
Oscar Ishengoma Kikoyo	Muleba kusini	CCM
Ridhiwani Jakaya Kikwete	Chalinze	CCM
Salma Rashid Kikwete	Nominated	CCM
Adelardus Lubango Kilangi	(Mwanasheria Mkuu)	anaingia ki-cheo
Dorothy George Kilave	Temeke	CCM
Alfred James Kimea	Korogwe City	CCM
Charles Stephen Kimei	Vunjo	CCM
Ali Hassan Omar King	Jang'ombe	CCM
Elibariki Emmanuel Kingu	Singida West	CCM
Omary Juma Kipanga	Mafia	CCM
Santiel Eric Kirumba	Reserved	CCM
Stephen Lemomo Kiruswa Mamasita	Longido	CCM
Mariamu Nassoro Kisangi	Reserved	CCM
Edward Olelekaita Kisau	Kiteto	CCM
Jumanne Kibera Kishimba	Kahama City	CCM
Jesca David Kishoa	Reserved	CHADEMA
Jackson Gedion Kiswaga	Kalenga	CCM
Dunstan Luka Kitandula	Mkinga	CCM
Silvestry Fransis Koka	Kibaha City	CCM
Leah Jeremiah Komanya	Meatu	CCM
Omar Issa Kombo	Wingwi	CCM
Bahati Khamis Kombo		CCM
Zuberi Mohamedi Kuchauka	Liwale	CCM
Godwin Emmanuel Kunambi	Mlimba	CCM
Hassan Zidadu Kungu	Tunduru Kaskazini	CCM
Aloyce Andrew Kwezi	Kaliua	CCM
Florent Laurent Kyombo	Nkenge	CCM
Dennis Lazaro Londo	Mikumi	CCM
Fredrick Edward Lowassa	Monduli	CCM
Neema Kichiki Lugangira	Reserved	CCM
William Vangimembe Lukuvi	Ismani	CCM
Riziki Saidi Lulida	Nominated	CCM
Anna Richard Lupembe	Nsimbo	CCM
Simon Songe Lusengekile	Busega	CCM
Livingstone Joseph Lusinde	Mtera	CCM
Robert Chacha Maboto	Bunda City	CCM
Amina Iddi Mabrouk	Zanzibar	CCM
Angeline Sylvester Lubala Mabula	Ilemela	CCM
Stanslaus Shing'oma Mabula	Nyamagana	CCM
Mwigulu Lameck Nchemba Madelu	Iramba West	CCM
Saashisha Elinikyo Mafuwe	Hai	CCM
Nicodemas Henry Maganga	Mbogwe	CCM
Kasalali Emmanuel Mageni	Sumve	CCM
Tumaini Bryceson Magessa	Busanda	CCM
Catherine Valentine Magige	Reserved	CCM
Janeth Elias Mahawanga	Reserved	CCM
Maryprisca Winfred Mahundi	Reserved	CCM
Athumani Almas Maige	Tabora Kaskazini	CCM
Kunti Yusuph Majala	Reserved	CHADEMA
Kassim Majaliwa Majaliwa	Ruangwa	CCM
January Yusuf Makamba	Bumbuli	CCM
Salome Wycliffe Makamba	Reserved	CHADEMA
Assa Nelson Makanika	Kigoma Kaskazini	CCM
Ally Juma Makoa	Kondoa City	CCM
Tunza Issa Malapo	Reserved	CHADEMA
Anne Kilango Malecela	Same East	CCM
Esther Edwin Maleko	Reserved	CCM
Angelina Adam Malembeka	Reserved	CCM
George Natany Malima	Mpwapwa	CCM
Shukrani Elisha Manya	Nominated	CCM
Stella Martin Manyanya	Nyasa	CCM
Vedastus Mathayo Manyinyi	Musoma City	CCM
Martha Festo Mariki	Reserved	CCM
Agnes Mathew Marwa	Reserved	CCM
Juliana Didas Masaburi	Reserved	CCM
Mary Francis Masanja	Reserved	CCM
Hamad Yussuf Masauni	Kikwajuni	CCM
Janeth Maurice Massaburi	Reserved	CCM
Yahaya Omary Massare	Manyoni West	CCM
Flatei Gregory Massay	Mbulu Rural	CCM
Kundo Andrea Mathew	Bariadi	CCM
Esther Nicholus Matiko	Reserved	CHADEMA
Furaha Ntengo Matondo	Reserved	CCM
Aysharose Ndogholi Mattembe	Reserved	CCM
Anthony Peter Mavunde	Dodoma mjini	CCM
Lucy Thomas Mayenga	Reserved	CCM
Makame Mnyaa Mbarawa	Mkoani	CCM
Amour Khamis Mbarouk	Tumbe	CCM
Amber. Mbarouk Nassor Mbarouk	Nominated	CCM
Vincent Paul Mbogo	Nkasi Kusini	CCM
Taska Restituta Mbogo	Reserved	CCM
Jonas William Mbunda	Mbinga City	CCM
Mohamed Omary Mchengerwa	Rufiji	CCM
Issa Ally Mchungahela	Lulindi	CCM
Halima James Mdee	Reserved	CHADEMA
Subira Khamis Mgalu	Reserved	CCM
Neema William Mgaya	Reserved	CCM
Antipas Zeno Mgungusi	Malinyi	CCM
Joseph Kizito Mhagama	Madaba	CCM
Jenista Joackim Mhagama	Peramiho	CCM
Yahya Ally Mhata	Nanyumbu	CCM
Esther Lukago Midimu	Reserved	CCM
Rehema Juma Migilla	Ulyankulu	CCM
Minza Simon Mjika	Reserved	CCM
Abdi Hija Mkasha	Micheweni	CCM
Adolf Faustine Mkenda	Rombo	CCM
Muharami Shabani Mkenge	Bagamoyo	CCM
George Huruma Mkuchika	Newala City	CCM
Kitila Alexander Mkumbo	Ubungo	CCM
Joseph Michael Mkundi	Ukerewe	CCM
Haji Makame Mlenge	Chake Chake	CCM
Alexander Pastory Mnyeti	Misungwi	CCM
Timotheo Paul Mnzava	Korogwe Rural	CCM
Christina Christopher Mnzava	Reserved	CCM
Ali Juma Mohamed	Shaurimoyo	CCM
Asya Mwadini Mohammed	Reserved	CHADEMA
Noah Lemburis Saputi Mollel	Arumeru-West	CCM
Godwin Oloyce Mollel	Siha	CCM
Mohamed Lujuo Monni	Chemba	CCM
Daimu Iddi Mpakate	Tunduru Kusini	CCM
Twaha Ally Mpembenwe	Kibiti	CCM
Luhaga Joelson Mpina	Kisesa	CCM
Jesca Jonathani Msambatavangu	Iringa City	CCM
Shamsia Aziz Mtamba	Mtwara Rural	CUF
Maimuna Salum Mtanda	Newala Rural	CCM
Miraji Jumanne Mtaturu	Singida East	CCM
Francis Leonard Mtega	Mbarali	CCM
Issa Jumanne Mtemvu	Kibamba	CCM
Hassan Seleman Mtenga	Mtwara City	CCM
Francis Isack Mtinga	Iramba East	CCM
Sospeter Mwijarubi Muhongo	Musoma Rural	CCM
Liberata Rutageruka Mulamula	Nominated	CCM
Philipo Augustino Mulugo	Songwe	CCM
Bernadeta Kasabago Mushashu	Reserved	CCM
Mussa Hassan Mussa	Amani	CCM
Joseph Kasheku Musukuma	Geita	CCM
Tabasamu Hamisi Hussein Mwagao	Sengerema	CCM
Hawa Subira Mwaifunga	Reserved	CHADEMA
Sophia Hebron Mwakagenda	Reserved	CHADEMA
Michael Constantino Mwakamo	Kibaha Rural	CCM
Bupe Nelson Mwakang'ata	Reserved	CCM
Emmanuel Adamson Mwakasaka	Tabora City	CCM
Atupele Fredy Mwakibete	Busokelo	CCM
Ummy Ally Mwalimu	Reserved	CCM
Geoffrey Idelphonce Mwambe	Masasi City	CCM
Cecil David Mwambe	Ndanda	CCM
Neema Gerald Mwandabila	Reserved	CCM
Anton Albert Mwantona	Rungwe	CCM
Deodatus Philip Mwanyika	Njombe City	CCM
George Ranwell Mwenisongole	Mbozi	CCM
Charles John Mwijage	Muleba Kaskazini	CCM
Hamis Mohammed Mwinjuma	Muheza	CCM
Mohamed Abdulrahman Mwinyi	Chambani	CCM
Abbas Ali Mwinyi	Fuoni	CCM
Abdullah Ali Mwinyi	Mahonda	CCM
Maryam Azan Mwinyi	Chake Chake	CCM
Amina Ali Mzee	Reserved	CCM
Norah Waziri Mzeru	Reserved	CCM
Mariamu Ditopile Mzuzuri	Reserved	CCM
Paulina Daniel Nahato	Reserved	CCM
Mashimba Mashauri Ndaki	Maswa West	CCM
Patrick Alois Ndakidemi	Moshi Rural	CCM
Joyce Lazaro Ndalichako	Kasulu City	CCM
Deogratius John Ndejembi	Chamwino	CCM
Ummy Hamisi Nderiananga	Reserved	CCM
Bahati Keneth Ndingo	Reserved	CCM
Job Yustino Ndugai	Kongwa	CCM
Faustine Engelbert Ndugulile	Kigamboni	CCM
Francis Kumba Ndulane	Kilwa Kaskazini	CCM
Advocate Damas Daniel Ndumbaro	Songea City	CCM
Irene Alex Ndyamkama	Reserved	CCM
Nicholaus George Ngassa	Igunga	CCM
Kilumbe Shabani Ng'enda	Kigoma City	CCM
Jacqueline Kandidus Ngonyani (Msongozi)	Reserved	CCM
Ahmed Juma Ngwali	Ziwani	CCM
Kwagilwa Reuben Nhamanilo	Handeni City	CCM
Felista Deogratius Njau	Reserved	CHADEMA
Oran Manase Njeza	Mbeya Rural	CCM
Nape Moses Nnauye	Mtama	CCM
Kenneth Ernest Nollo	Bahi	CCM
Thea Medard Ntara	Reserved	CCM
Nancy Hassan Nyalusi	Reserved	CCM
Justin Lazaro Nyamoga	Kilolo	CCM
Tauhida Cassian Galoss Nyimbo	Reserved	CCM
Mariam Madalu Nyoka	Reserved	CCM
Stanslaus Haroon Nyongo	Maswa East	CCM
Christopher Olonyokie Ole-Sendeka	Simanjiro	CCM
Omar Ali Omar	Wete	ACT
Salim Mussa Omar	Gando	CCM
Mohamed Suleiman Omar	Malindi	CCM
Juma Hamad Omar	Ole	CCM
Zulfa Mmaka Omar	Reserved	CCM
Asya Sharif Omar	Reserved	CCM
John Danielson Pallangyo	Arumeru-East	CCM
Cecilia Daniel Paresso	Reserved	CHADEMA
Maimuna Ahmad Pathan	Reserved	CCM
Paschal Katambi Patrobas	Shinyanga City	CCM
Issaay Zacharia Paulo	Mbulu City	CCM
Geophrey Mizengo Pinda	Kavuu	CCM
Humphrey Herson Polepole	Nominated	CCM
Ussi Salum Pondeza	Chumbuni	CCM
Venant Daud Protas	Igalula	CCM
Regina Ndege Qwaray	Reserved	CCM
Mustafa Mwinyikondo Rajab	Dimani	CCM
Ramadhan Suleiman Ramadhan	Chake Chake	CCM
Abeid Ighondo Ramadhani	Singida Kaskazini	CCM
Rashid Abdalla Rashid	Kiwani	CCM
Shally Josepha Raymond	Reserved	CCM
Yustina Arcadius Rohhi	Reserved	CCM
Ndaisaba George Ruhoro	Ngara	CCM
Conchesta Leonce Rwamlaza	Reserved	CHADEMA
Jasson Samson Rweikiza	Bukoba Rural	CCM
Lucy John Sabu	Reserved	CCM
Simai Hassan Sadiki	Nungwi	CCM
Mwanakhamis Kassim Said	Magomeni	CCM
Maryam Omar Said	Pandani	CUF
John Michael Sallu	Handeni Rural	CCM
Ahmed Ally Salum	Solwa	CCM
Florence George Samizi	Muhambwe	CCM
Deo Kasenyenda Sanga	Makambako	CCM
Festo Richard Sanga	Makete	CCM
Deus Clement Sangu	Kwela	CCM
Seif Salum Seif	Mtambile	CUF
Husna Juma Sekiboko	Reserved	CCM
Oliver Daniel Semuguruka	Reserved	CCM
Salum Mohammed Shaafi	Chonga	ACT
Ahmed Mabukhut Shabiby	Gairo	CCM
Zubeida Khamis Shaib	Mfenesini	CCM
Rashid Abdallah Shangazi	Mlalo	CCM
Shabani Omari Shekilindi	Lushoto	CCM
Eric James Shigongo	Buchosa	CCM
Kabula Enock Shitobela	Reserved	CCM
Juliana Daniel Shonza	Reserved	CCM
Condester Michael Sichalwe	Momba	CCM
Sylivia Francis Sigula	Reserved	CCM
Jerry William Silaa	Ukonga	CCM
Njalu Daudi Silanga	Itilima	CCM
David Ernest Silinde	Tunduma	CCM
Daniel Baran Sillo	Babati Rural	CCM
Mussa Ramadhani Sima	Singida City	CCM
George Boniface Simbachawene	Kibakwe	CCM
Margaret Simwanza Sitta	Urambo	CCM
Khalifa Salum Suleiman	Tunguu	CCM
Suleiman Haroub Suleiman	Zanzibar	CCM
Zaytun Seif Swai	Reserved	CCM
Edwin Enosy Swalle	Lupembe	CCM
Joseph Anania Tadayo	Mwanga	CCM
Shabani Hamisi Taletale	Morogoro	CCM
Munde Abdallah Tambwe	Reserved	CCM
Priscus Jacob Tarimo	Moshi City	CCM
Khadija Shaaban Taya	Reserved	CCM
Grace Victor Tendega	Reserved	CHADEMA
Anatropia Lwehikila Theonest	Reserved	CHADEMA
Daniel Awack Tlemai	Karatu	CCM
Fatma Hassan Toufiq	Reserved	CCM
Toufiq Salim Turky	Mpendae	CCM
Rose Cyprian Tweve	Reserved	CCM
Abdallah Hamis Ulega	Mkuranga	CCM
Mwanaisha Ng'anzi Ulenge	Reserved	CCM
Tecla Mohamedi Ungele	Reserved	CCM
Khamis Ali Vuai	Mkwajuni	CCM
Mwita Mwikwabe Waitara	Tarime Rural	CCM
Jafari Chege Wambura	Rorya	CCM
Anastazia James Wambura	Reserved	CCM
Amina Bakar Yussuf	Reserved	CCM
Selemani Jumanne Zedi	Bukene	CCM
Jonas Van Zeeland	Mvomero	CCM
Mwantumu Mzamii Zodo	Reserved	CCM
Mussa Azzan Zungu	Ilala	CCM

== See also ==
- List of MPs elected in the 2015 Tanzania general election
- List of MPs elected in the 2010 Tanzania general election
- List of Tanzania National Assembly members 2005–2010
