= Halima Mdee =

Tanzanian politician

Honourable Halima Mdee MP

Member of Parliament for Kawe Constituency
- In office 2005–2010
- In office November 2010 – November 2020
- Succeeded by: Josephat Gwajima

Member of Parliament Special Seats
- Incumbent
- Assumed office November 2020
- Constituency: Women Representative

Personal details
- Born: 18 March 1978 (age 48)
- Party: CHADEMA
- Education: University of Dar es Salaam (LL.B); University of Cape Town (LL.M)

Halima James Mdee (born 18 March 1978) is a Tanzanian politician and a special seat women representative MP from CHADEMA serving since 2020.

Mdee was a Member of Parliament for Kawe constituency from 2010 to 2020 when she lost her seat to Bishop Josephat Gwajima. In 2020 Mdee was appointed a special seat MP for CHADEMA together with 18 others in a very controversial list which led to the conflicts between them and their political party. The conflict was because CHADEMA denied having appointed the 19 Special seat MP's. Due to the misunderstanding between Halima Mdee together with her fellow newly appointed special seat MP visa vis their political party, CHADEMA through its Central Committee expelled Halima Mdee and other 18 MPs from the Party. Following the decision of the CHADEMA central committee Halima Mdee and other 18 MPs appealed to the CHADEMA Governing Council to challenge the decision of the Central Committee. On 11 May 2022 the CHADEMA Governing Council anonymously confirmed and or upheld the decision of the Central Committee The 19 MPs who were expelled are Halima Mdee, Esther Matiko, Grace Tendega, Cecilia Pareso, Esther Bulaya, Agnesta Lambart Kaiza, Nusrat Hanje, Jesca Kishoa, Hawa Mwaifunga, Tunza Malapo and Asya Mwadini Mohammed.

Others are Felister Njau, Nagenjwa Kaboyoka, Sophia Mwakagenda, Kunti Majala, Stella Fiyao, Anatropia Theonest, Salome Makamba and Conchesta Rwamlaza. Following the expulsion Chadema General secretary John Mnyika wrote a letter to the Speaker of the National Assembly so that she can declare that the 19 mps have lost qualifications of being members of Parliament as per Tanzanian 1977 Constitution. But despite that fact on 13 May 2022 the 19 MPs continued to attend the Parliament sessions in Dodoma.

On 16 May 2022 the Speaker of the National Assembly Tulia Akson Mwansasu declined to declare that the seats of the 19 Special seat MP'S from CHADEMA are vacant citing the injunction which was filed in court. According to the Speaker, the Parliament can not interferes with the court decisions. On 22 June 2022 the High Court of Tanzania delivered a ruling dismissing a case filed by Halima Mdee and 18 other MPs seeking the leave of the court to challenge the decision of the CHADEMA Governing Council by way of Judicial review. In his decision Judge Mgeta cited irregularities being the main reason for dismissal of the said petition, asserting that the MPs addressed the wrong respondent who in law supposed to be the "Registered trustee of Chama Cha Demokrasia na Maendeleo" and not the Board of Trustees of Chama Cha Demokrasia na Maendeleo as it was indicated in the petition
