= Deputy ministers of Tanzania =

Deputy ministers in Tanzania assist the ministers in running their respective portfolios.

Party key	Chama Cha Mapinduzi

Cabinet of Tanzania: 12 December 2015 – present
Portrait	Portfolio	Incumbent
	President’s Office; Regional Administration, Local Government, Civil Service and Good Governance	Josephat Kandege MP
	President’s Office; Regional Administration, Local Government, Civil Service and Good Governance	George Kakunda MP
	Vice President’s Office; Union Affairs and Environment	Alphaxard Lugola MP
	Prime Minister's Office; Policy, Parliamentary Affairs, Labour, Employment, Youth and the Disabled	Stella Ikupa Alex MP
	Prime Minister's Office; Policy, Parliamentary Affairs, Labour, Employment, Youth and the Disabled	Antony Mavunde MP
	Agriculture	Dr Mary Mwanjelwa MP
	Constitutional Affairs and Justice	–
	Defence and National Service	–
	Education, Science, Technology and Vocational Training	William Tate Olenasha MP
	Energy	Subira Khamis Mgalu MP
	Mining	Stanslaus Haroon Nyongo MP
	Finance and Planning	Ashatu Kijaji MP
	Foreign Affairs, E.A.C., Regional and International Cooperation	Suzan Kolimba MP
	Health, Community Development, Gender, Seniors and Children	Faustine Ndugulile MP
	Home Affairs	Hamad Masauni MP
	Industry, Trade and Investment	Stella Manyanya MP
	Information, Culture, Artists and Sports	Juliana Shonza MP
	Lands, Housing and Human Settlements	Angeline Mabula MP
	Natural Resources and Tourism	Japhet Hasunga MP
	Water and Irrigation	Jumaa Hamidu Aweso MP
	Works, Transport and Communication	Atashasta Justus Nditiye MP
	Works, Transport and Communication	Elias John Kwandikwa MP

== See also ==
- Cabinet of Tanzania
