= Maryprisca Mahundi =

Tanzanian politician

Honorable Maryprisca Mahundi MP

Deputy Minister for Water
- Incumbent
- Assumed office December 2020
- President: John Magufuli; Samia Suluhu
- Preceded by: Jumaa Hamidu Aweso

Member of Parliament
- Incumbent
- Assumed office November 2020
- Preceded by: Special Seats
- Succeeded by: Special Seats
- Constituency: Women Rep

Personal details
- Born: Maryprisca Winfred Mahundi; 4 July 1978 (age 47)
- Party: Chama Cha Mapinduzi
- Education: Makongo High School
- Alma mater: Mbeya University of Science and Technology; Mzumbe University; Tianjin Railways College; Dar es Salaam Institute of Technology
- Profession: Engineer

Maryprisca Winfred Mahundi is a Tanzanian politician and Deputy Minister for Water and presently serving as the Chama Cha Mapinduzi's member of parliament for women representatives in special seats since November 2020.

== Career ==
She was also a civil servant who was a former Chunya District Commissioner from 2018 until 2020, appointed by then President John Magufuli.
