= Abubakar Asenga =

Tanzanian politician

Honorable Abubakar Asenga MP

Member of Parliament
- Incumbent
- Assumed office 2020
- Preceded by: Peter Lijualikali
- Constituency: Kilombero

Personal details
- Born: Abubakar Damian Alphonse Asenga; June 13, 1983 (age 43) Ifakara, Kilombero
- Citizenship: Tanzanian
- Party: Party of the Revolution
- Education: Bachelors
- Alma mater: Open University of Tanzania; Mwalimu Nyerere Memorial Academy; Ifakara Health Institute

Abubakar Damian Asenga (born June 13, 1983) is a Tanzanian politician who currently serves as a Member of Parliament for the Kilombero Constituency, representing Chama Cha Mapinduzi, since November 2020. He previously served as District Administrative Secretary (DAS) of Rombo District in Kilimanjaro.

== See also ==
- Adolf Mkenda
