= Agnes Marwa =

Tanzanian politician

Honourable Agnes Mathew Marwa MP

MP Special Seat
- Incumbent
- Assumed office 2015

Personal details
- Born: December 24, 1978 (age 47) Mara Region, Tanzania
- Party: Chama Cha Mapinduzi

Agnes Mathew Marwa (born December 24, 1978) is a Tanzanian politician and a member of the Chama Cha Mapinduzi political party. She was elected MP to fill in the Special Seats position in 2015.
