= Deputy minister =

Political title

Deputy minister is a title borne by politicians or officials in certain countries governed under a parliamentary system. A deputy minister is positioned in some way "under" a minister, who is a full member of Cabinet, in charge of a particular standing policy portfolio, and typically oversees an associated civil service department. Depending on the jurisdiction, a "Deputy minister" may be a Cabinet minister who regularly acts as and for a more senior cabinet minister (rare except in the case of "Deputy Prime Minister"), a junior minister assigned to assist a cabinet minister, an elected member of the governing party or coalition assigned to assist a specific cabinet minister "from the back benches" (i.e., not part of the Cabinet, Government or Ministry) or a non-elected head of a civil service department taking political direction from a Cabinet minister.

- Bangladesh: A Deputy minister is junior to a Minister of a Department of State (portfolio minister) and of similar standing to a Parliamentary Secretary.
- Canada: The Deputy minister is the senior civil servant in a government department and takes political direction from an appointed minister of the Crown.
- Japan: A Deputy Minister assists the work of the Cabinet of Japan.
- Malaysia: A Deputy minister is not a member of the Cabinet and also called half minister. It is secondary to and ranked below ministers. Deputy ministers deputise for ministers. A ministry usually has one or two deputy ministers.
- Netherlands: A State Secretary is the title of a junior member of the Cabinet of the Netherlands.
- Poland: The ministries are staffed by secretaries of state and undersecretaries of state, commonly referred to as deputy ministers. Their task is to assist the Minister and replace him if necessary. Main article: Secretary of state (Poland)
- South Africa: A Deputy Minister is secondary to cabinet ministers. The Official Opposition Shadow Cabinet also has deputy shadow ministers.
- Sri Lanka: A Deputy ministers are junior ministers ranking below that of cabinet minister and State Minister. It is similar to the pre-1972 post of Parliamentary Secretary.
- Tanzania: The Deputy ministers are junior ministers, and are usually not members of the government's cabinet.
- Timor-Leste: The Government, which comprises the Prime Minister, Ministers and Secretaries of State, may include one or more Deputy Prime Ministers and Deputy Ministers.

== See also ==
- Minister (government)
- Departmental assistant
- Deputy prime minister
- Ministers of State
- Associate Minister
