= Jesca =

Jesca is a given name. Notable people with the name include:

- Jesca Ababiku (born 1975), Ugandan educator and politician
- Jesca Achan (born 1991), Ugandan netball player
- Jesca Hoop (born 1975), American singer-songwriter and guitarist
- Jesca Kishoa (born 1989), Tanzanian politician
