= Josephat Gwajima =

Tanzanian preacher and politician (born 1970)

Honourable Josephat Gwajima MP

Member of Parliament for Kawe Constituency
- Incumbent
- Assumed office November 2020
- Preceded by: Halima Mdee

Personal details
- Born: Josephat Mathias Gwajima; 19 December 1970 (age 55) Mwanza, Tanzania
- Party: Chama Cha Mapinduzi

Josephat Mathias Gwajima (born 19 December 1970) is a Tanzanian politician and preacher. He is bishop of his own Glory of Christ Tanzania Church (GCTC).

In the October 2020 parliamentary election Gwajima won the Kawe Constituency against the former MP, Kawe Halima Mdee. Gwajima is a member of the ruling Chama Cha Mapinduzi party. He is a member of the Parliamentary Committee on Industries, Trade and Environment.

== Education and church ==
Josephat Mathias Gwajima was born in Mwanza, Tanzania. He went to Bible school in Nairobi and then founded his own church in Mwanza, followed by others in Musoma and Dar es Salaam.

He holds a master's degree from the Japan Bible Institute and an honorary doctorate from Omega Global University in South Africa. Both institutions also award their degrees in correspondence courses and for donations.

== Politics ==
In the parliamentary elections in October 2020, Gwajima won the Kawe Constituency against opposition MP Halima Mdee from Chadema. He sits on the Committee on Industry, Trade and environment of the Tanzanian Parliament.

In June 2025, authorities closed down his church after Gwajima criticised human rights abuses by the government during a Sunday service.
