= Sophia Mwakagenda =

Tanzanian politician

Honourable Sophia Hebron Mwakagenda MP

Member of Parliament
- Incumbent
- Assumed office November 2020
- Preceded by: Special Seats
- Succeeded by: Special Seats
- Constituency: Women Rep

Personal details
- Born: Sophia Hebron Mwakagenda; 13 March 1970 (age 56) Mbeya Region, Tanzania
- Party: CHADEMA
- Education: Chang'ombe Primary School; Jitegemee Secondary School
- Alma mater: Mwalimu Nyerere Memorial Academy; Tanzania Institute of Accountancy

Sophia Hebron Mwakagenda (born 13 March 1970) is a Tanzanian politician and a member of the CHADEMA political party. She was elected as a member of the Special Seats as women representative and serves as member of parliament since 2020.
