= Tarimo =

Tarimo is a Tanzanian surname. Notable people with the surname include:

- Andrew Tarimo, Tanzanian academic professor and researcher.
- Bruno Tarimo (born 1995), Tanzanian professional boxer.
- Irene Tarimo (born 1964), Tanzanian environmental scientist and educator.
- Priscus Tarimo, Tanzanian businessman and politician.
- Wilfred Tarimo, (born 1990), Tanzanian Bible Teacher, Preacher and Entrepreneur
