= Thea Ntara =

Tanzanian politician

Honorable Thea Medard Ntara MP

Member of Parliament
- Incumbent
- Assumed office 2020
- Preceded by: Special Seats
- Succeeded by: Special Seats
- Constituency: Women Representative

Personal details
- Born: Thea Medard Ntara Iringa Region, Tanzania
- Party: Party of the Revolution
- Education: Korogwe High School; Masasi Girls High School
- Alma mater: Open University of Tanzania; University of Dar es Salaam

Thea Medard Ntara (born in Iringa Region), is a Tanzanian academic and politician, a member of the Chama Cha Mapinduzi political party.

Ntara was elected as a women's representative of the Special Seats and serves as member of parliament since 2020.
