= Joseph Musukuma =

Tanzanian politician

Honourable Joseph Kasheku Musukuma MP

Member of Parliament for Geita
- Incumbent
- Assumed office December 2015

Personal details
- Born: 12 February 1974 (age 52)
- Party: Chama Cha Mapinduzi

Joseph Kasheku Musukuma (born February 12, 1974) is a Tanzanian politician and a member of the Chama Cha Mapinduzi political party. He was elected MP representing Geita in 2015.
