= Taska Mbogo =

Tanzanian politician

Honorable Taska Mbogo MP

Member of Parliament
- Incumbent
- Assumed office 2015
- Preceded by: Special Seats
- Succeeded by: Special Seats
- Constituency: Women Representative

Personal details
- Born: Taska Restituta Mbogo; August 14, 1960 (age 65) Mpanda, Katavi Region, Tanganyika Territory (now Tanzania)
- Party: Party of the Revolution
- Education: Kashaulili Primary School; Loleza Girls Secondary School
- Alma mater: Open University of Tanzania (LL.B); Kampala International University (LL.M); Law School of Tanzania
- Profession: Advocate

Taska Restituta Mbogo (born August 14, 1960) is a Tanzanian politician, a member of the Chama Cha Mapinduzi political party.

Ntara was elected as a women's representative of the Special Seats and serves as member of parliament since 2015.
