= Anatropia Theonest =

Tanzanian politician (born 1983)

Honourable Anatropia Lwehikila Theonest MP

Member of Parliament
- Incumbent
- Assumed office November 2020
- Preceded by: Special Seats
- Succeeded by: Special Seats
- Constituency: Women Rep

Personal details
- Born: Anatropia Lwehikila Theonest; 21 January 1983 (age 43) Kagera Region, Tanzania
- Party: CHADEMA
- Education: Hekima Secondary School; Bigwa Sister's Secondary School
- Alma mater: University of Dar es Salaam; Mzumbe University

Anatropia Lwehikila Theonest (born 21 January 1983) is a Tanzanian politician and a member of the CHADEMA political party. She was elected as a member of the Special Seats as women representative and serves as member of parliament since 2020.
