= Jesca Kishoa =

Tanzanian politician

Honourable Jesca David Kishoa MP

Member of Parliament
- Incumbent
- Assumed office November 2020
- Preceded by: Special Seats
- Succeeded by: Special Seats
- Constituency: Women Rep

Personal details
- Born: Jesca David Kishoa; 28 May 1989 (age 37) Tanzania
- Party: CCM
- Education: Dr. Salmin Secondary School; Hijra Seminary Secondary School
- Alma mater: Ruaha Catholic University; University of Dodoma

Jesca David Kishoa (born 28 May 1989) is a Tanzanian politician and a member of the CHADEMA political party. She was elected as a member of the Special Seats as women representative and serves as member of parliament since 2020.
