= Nusrat Hanje =

Tanzanian politician

Nusrat Shabaan Hanje

Personal details
- Born: 14 November 1989 (age 36)
- Party: CHADEMA
- Education: University of Dodoma
- Occupation: Politician

Nusrat Shabaan Hanje (born 14 November 1989) is a Tanzanian politician and a member of the CHADEMA political party. She was elected as a member of the Special Seats as a woman representative and has been serving as a member of parliament since 2020. Hanje was arrested in 2020 along with 19 Chadema cadres but was later released after the government dropped interest in continuing the case.

== Career ==
On May 18, 2025, Nusrat who was a Special Seats Member of Parliament for the Youth Group from Singida Region through CHADEMA party, announced to the people of the region and Tanzanians in general that she is leaving the party and joining the Revolutionary Party.

She joined the party due to President Samia Suluhu Hassan’s development projects, which address the needs of locals.
