= Theddy Ladislaus =

Hon. Theddy Ladislaus
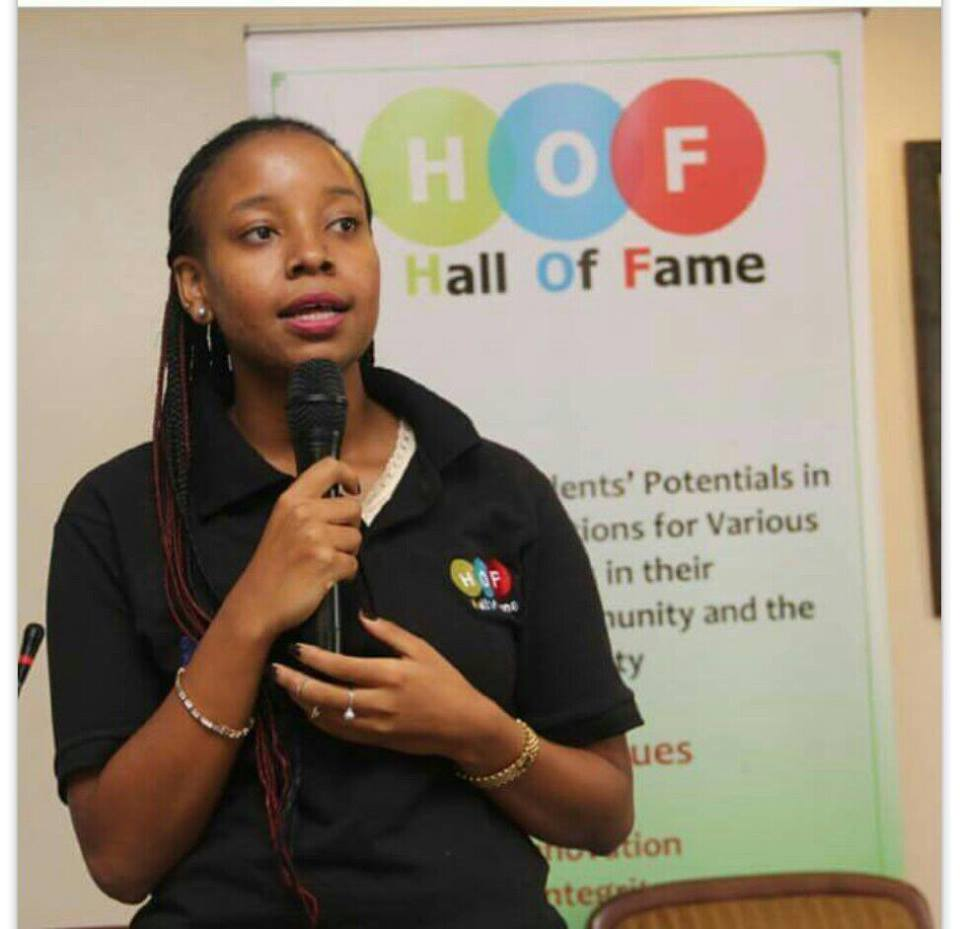

Member of the 1st Constituent Assembly of the United Republic of Tanzania
- In office 18 February 2014 – 2 October 2015
- Appointed by: Jakaya Mrisho Kikwete
- President: Jakaya Mrisho Kikwete

Vice President of Mzumbe University Student Organization
- In office January 2013 – January 2014
- In office February 18, 2014 – October 2, 2014

Personal details
- Born: Tanzania
- Education: Mzumbe University (Bsc. ICT-B)
- Profession: Politician
- Website: www.bungemaalum.go.tz/bunge/member_profile/498

Theddy Ladislaus is the youngest delegate of the first Constituent Assembly of Tanzania, representing students and youth in the constitution making process. She was appointed by His Excellency Dr. Jakaya Mrisho Kikwete, the former President of the United Republic of Tanzania.

== Early life ==
Theddy Ladislaus was born in the United Republic of Tanzania. She served as the vice president of the Mzumbe University Student Organisation-MUSO from 2013 to 2014. She was elected and later appointed as a delegate in the constituent assembly of Tanzania.

== Education ==
Ms Ladislaus pursued her degree in BSc information communication technology with business and later she did her master's degree in international business and entrepreneurship.
