= Subira Khamis Mgalu =

Tanzanian politician (born 1973)

Honourable Subira Khamis Mgalu MP
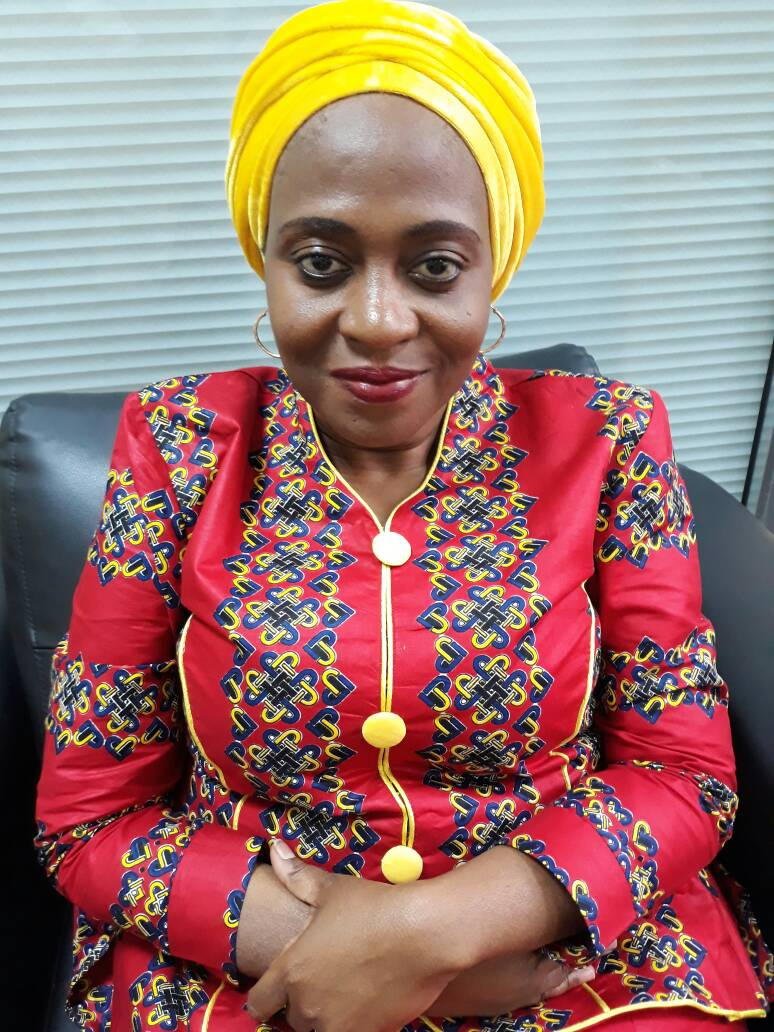

Deputy Minister for Energy
- Incumbent
- Assumed office October 2017
- President: John Magufuli
- Minister: Dr Medard Kalemani Matogoro

Member of Parliament
- Incumbent
- Assumed office 2010
- Constituency: Special Seats

Personal details
- Born: 17 May 1973 (age 53)
- Party: CCM
- Education: Mzumbe University

Subira Khamis Mgalu (born 17 May 1973) is a Tanzanian politician and member of the ruling Chama Cha Mapinduzi (CCM) who serves as the current Deputy Minister of Energy.

== Background and education ==
She completed her primary schooling from 1981 to 1987, studied at Mtwara Girls Secondary School from 1988 to 1991 and Ndanda high school from 1992 to 1994. She then studied at Mzumbe University from 1996 to 1999, where she received her Bachelors of Accountancy, and then went on to study there again to get a master's degree on Business Administration in Finance and Banking.

== Political career ==
Subira Khamis Mgalu was involved in politics while she was in school starting in 2006. MS Subira, when she was a member of Chama Cha Mapinduzi was elected to the position of member of Regional Executive Council UWT (Umoja wa Wanawake Tanzania) of Chama cha Mapinduzi for some years. She was appointed Deputy Minister for Energy in 2017 by the President of the United Republic of Tanzania John Magufuli during the changes he made on 7 October 2017. She serves under cabinet Minister Dr. Medard Matogolo Kalemani From 2011 to 2015 she was a member of different Parliament committees the likes of Local Authorities Accounts Committee, Finance and Economic Affairs Committee and Agriculture, Livestock and Water Committee.

She is a member of Parliament in Tanzania, serving her 2nd term. She was first appointed in 2010, and then for second term in 2015 to a special seats reserved for Women. She became a Deputy Minister for Energy in 2017.

== Work experience before political career ==
Work experience
Year	Position	Organization
2012 - 2015	District Commissioner-Muheza & Kisarawe	Prime Minister's Office Regional Administration and Local government Authorities
2009 - 2010	Auditor in Charge	President Office-State
2008 - 2009	Auditor in Charge-Pwani	National Audit Office
2005 - 2008	Senior Auditor	National Audit Office
2004 - 2005	Acting Chief Accountant	National Audit Office
1999 - 2001	Accountant III	Mtwara Municipality
2001 - 2004	Auditor III	National Audit Office
