= Stella Ikupa Alex =

Tanzanian accountant and politician

Honourable Stella Ikupa Alex MP

Deputy Minister of the Disabled
- In office October 2017 – 2020
- President: John Magufuli
- Minister: Kassim Majaliwa
- Succeeded by: Ummy Nderiananga

Member of Parliament
- Incumbent
- Assumed office 2015
- Constituency: Special Seats

Personal details
- Born: October 1, 1979 (age 47) Dar es Salaam, Tanzania
- Party: CCM
- Education: Tanzania Institute of Accountancy (Advanced Diploma in Accountancy); Mzumbe University (Master of Science in Accounts and Finance)

Stella Ikupa Alex (born 1 October 1979) is a Tanzanian accountant and politician, who is a member of the ruling Chama Cha Mapinduzi (CCM) party. She is the current deputy minister in the office of the Prime Minister of Tanzania, responsible for the disabled. She also serves as a Member of Parliament, having been appointed to a special seat in 2015.

== Background and education ==
Alex was born on 1 October 1979. She attended Minazi Mirefu Primary School, in Dar es Salaam, Tanzania's largest city and business hub, graduating in 1994. From 1995 to 1998, she attended Jangwani Girls Secondary School, also in Dar es Salaam for her O-Level studies. She stayed on at Jangwani for her A-Level education, graduating in 2001.

In 2002, she was admitted to the Tanzania Institute of Accountancy, at its Dar es Salaam campus, to pursue an Advanced Diploma in Accountancy, graduating in 2005. From 2009 until 2011, she successfully pursued a Master of Science degree in Accountancy and Finance, at the Dar es Salaam campus of Mzumbe University.

== Work history ==
In 2007, Alex began work in the Tanzania Ministry of Energy and Minerals as an accountant, serving in that capacity until 2014. That year, she was transferred to the Tanzania Ministry of Industry and Trade, as an accountant, serving there until 2015.

== Political career ==
Alex has been an active political operative in her community, in the ruling Cama Cha Mapiduzi political party, dating back to 2003. From then until 2015, she served as the treasurer of her local party branch. In 2013, she served as a member of the CCM District Constitutional Council. In 2015, she became a member of parliament under the special seat provision.

On 7 October 2017, president John Magufuli appointed her deputy minister, in the office of the prime minister, responsible for the disabled.
