= Associate Minister =

Associate Minister may refer to:

- Associate Minister of National Defence (Canada)
- Associate Minister of Finance (Canada)
- Associate Minister of Health (Canada)
- Associate Minister of Finance (New Zealand)
- Associate Minister of Women's Social and Economic Opportunity (Ontario, Canada)

== See also ==
- Minister
- Deputy minister
