= Mwita Waitara =

Tanzanian politician

Honourable Mwita Mwikwabe Waitara MP

Member of Parliament for Ukonga constituency
- Incumbent
- Assumed office December 2015

Deputy Minister of State in President Office, TAMISEMI
- In office 10 November 2018 – 2022
- President: John Magufuli

Personal details
- Born: 17 July 1976 (age 50) Mara Region, Tanzania
- Party: CCM

Mwita Mwikwabe Waitara (born 17 July 1976) is a Tanzanian politician and former cabinet Minister. He is a member of the CCM political party and was elected MP representing Tarime urban since 2015.

== Career ==
He left his political party CHADEMA and join CCM from 28 July 2018. On 10 November 2018 he was appointed as Deputy Minister of State by President John Magufuli. On 13 November 2018 he was officially sworn in as Deputy Minister of State in the President's Office, Regional Administration and Local Government.
