= Cecilia Paresso =

Tanzanian politician

Honourable Cecilia Daniel Paresso MP

MP Special Seats
- In office 2015–2020

Personal details
- Born: 22 November 1981 (age 44) Tanzania
- Party: Chadema
- Education: Open University of Tanzania

Cecilia Daniel Paresso (born November 22, 1981) is a Tanzanian politician and a member of the CHADEMA political party. She was elected as a member of the Special Seats in 2015. She has bachelor degree from the Open University of Tanzania in 2011.
