= Conchesta Rwamlaza =

Tanzanian politician

Honourable Conchesta Rwamlaza MP

Member of Parliament
- Incumbent
- Assumed office November 2020
- Preceded by: Special Seats
- Succeeded by: Special Seats
- Constituency: Women Rep

Personal details
- Born: Conchesta Leonce Rwamlaza; 17 July 1953 (age 72) Kagera Region, Tanzania
- Party: CHADEMA
- Education: Rugambwa Secondary School; Rutabo Upper Primary School
- Alma mater: Katoke Teachers Training College

Conchesta Leonce Rwamlaza (born 17 July 1953) is a Tanzanian politician, a member of the CHADEMA political party.

Rwamlaza was elected as a women's representative of the Special Seats and serves as member of parliament since 2020.
