= Hawa Mwaifunga =

Tanzanian politician (born 1976)

Honourable Hawa Subira Mwaifunga MP

Member of Parliament
- Incumbent
- Assumed office November 2020
- Preceded by: Special Seats
- Succeeded by: Special Seats
- Constituency: Women Rep

Personal details
- Born: Hawa Subira Mwaifunga; 27 March 1976 (age 50) Tanzania
- Party: CHADEMA
- Education: Isike Primary School; Ndembela Secondary School
- Alma mater: Dar es Salaam School of Accountancy; College of Business Education

Hawa Subira Mwaifunga (born 27 March 1976) is a Tanzanian politician and a member of the CHADEMA political party. She was elected as a member of the Special Seats as a women's representative and she served as a member of parliament since 2020.
