= Asya Mwadini Mohammed =

Tanzanian politician

Honourable Asya Mwadini Mohammed MP

Member of Parliament
- Incumbent
- Assumed office November 2020
- Preceded by: Special Seats
- Succeeded by: Special Seats
- Constituency: Women Rep

Personal details
- Born: Asya Mwadini Mohammed; 1 April 1982 (age 44) Tanzania
- Party: CHADEMA
- Education: M'ladu Primary School; Haile Selassie Secondary School
- Alma mater: Dar College

Asya Mwadini Mohammed (born 1 April 1982) is a Tanzanian politician and a member of the CHADEMA political party. She was elected as a member of the Special Seats as women representative and serves as member of parliament since 2020.
