= Paulina Daniel Nahato =

Tanzanian politician

Honourable Paulina Daniel Nahato MP
- President: John Magufuli (2020-2021)
- President: Samia Suluhu Hassan (2021-)

Member of Parliament
- Incumbent
- Assumed office 2020
- Constituency: Special Seats

Personal details
- Born: 3 March 1967 (age 59)
- Party: CCM
- Education: University of Dar es Salaam; University of Oslo

Paulina Daniel Nahato (born 3 March 1967) is a Tanzanian politician and academic. A member of the ruling Chama Cha Mapinduzi (CCM), she has been a member of the National Assembly since 2020.

== Biography ==
Nahato attended Suji Primary School and completed secondary schooling at Parane Secondary School and the Kibasila Center in Dar es Salaam. She completed Bachelors, Masters and Doctorate degrees at the University of Dar es Salaam and a Masters at the University of Oslo. Since 2007 she has worked at the Department of Behavioural Sciences, School of Public Health, Muhimbili University.

In 2020, she was nominated to fill one of the Special Seats in the National Assembly reserved for women. She presently serves as a member of the Social Services and Community Development Committee. She has participated in public campaigns for improved sanitation.
