= Kunti Majala =

Tanzanian politician

Honourable Kunti Majala MP

Member of Parliament
- Incumbent
- Assumed office November 2020
- Preceded by: Special Seats
- Succeeded by: Special Seats
- Constituency: Women Rep

Personal details
- Born: Kunti Yusuph Majala; 14 August 1982 (age 43) Tanzania
- Party: CHADEMA
- Education: Chenene Primary School
- Alma mater: Jamhuri Secondary School

Kunti Yusuph Majala (born 14 August 1982) is a Tanzanian politician and a member of the CHADEMA political party. She was elected as a member of the Special Seats as women representative and serves as member of parliament since 2020.
