= Hamad Masauni =

Tanzanian politician

Honourable Hamad Masauni MP

Minister responsible for Union and Environment in Vice President's Office
- Incumbent
- Assumed office 10 January 2022
- Preceded by: George Simbachawene

Member of Parliament for Kikwajuni
- Incumbent
- Assumed office November 2010

Personal details
- Born: 3 October 1973 (age 53)
- Party: CCM
- Education: Northumbria University

Hamad Yussuf Masauni (born 3 October 1973) is a Tanzanian CCM politician and Member of Parliament for Kikwajuni constituency since 2010. On 10 January 2022, he was sworn in as the new Minister for Home Affairs.
