= Tunza Malapo =

Tanzanian politician

Honourable Tunza Issa Malapo MP

Member of Parliament
- Incumbent
- Assumed office November 2020
- Preceded by: Special Seats
- Succeeded by: Special Seats
- Constituency: Women Rep

Personal details
- Born: Tunza Issa Malapo; 25 July 1983 (age 42) Tanzania
- Party: CHADEMA
- Education: Ligula Primary School; Kilakala Secondary School
- Alma mater: University of Dar es Salaam

Tunza Issa Malapo (born 25 July 1983) is a Tanzanian politician and a member of the CHADEMA political party. She was elected as a member of the Special Seats as women representative and serves as member of parliament since 2020.
