= Salome Makamba =

Tanzanian politician

Honourable Salome Makamba MP
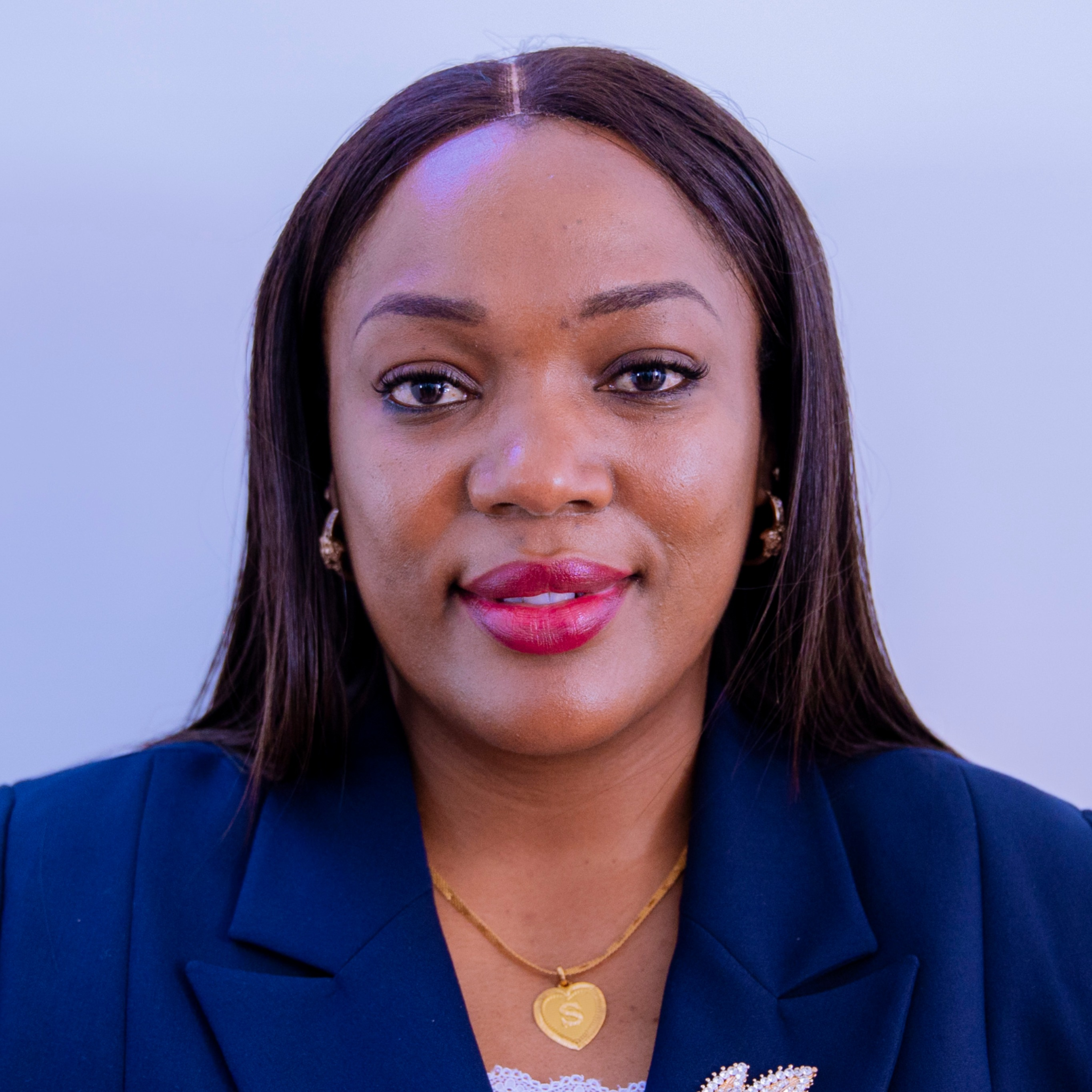

Member of Parliament
- Incumbent
- Assumed office November 2020
- Preceded by: Special Seats
- Succeeded by: Special Seats
- Constituency: Women Rep

Personal details
- Born: Salome Wycliffe Makamba; 18 February 1987 (age 39) Shinyanga Region, Tanzania
- Party: CHADEMA
- Education: Uhuru Secondary School; Kowak Girls' Secondary school
- Alma mater: Tumaini University

Salome Wycliffe Makamba (born 18 February 1987) is a Tanzanian politician and a member of the CHADEMA political party. She was elected as a member of the Special Seats as women representative and serves as member of parliament since 2020.

== Career ==
Makamba is currently the Deputy Minister of Energy in Tanzania and a Member of Parliament, where she brings expertise in project oversight, energy policy, and community engagement.

In 2024, alongside Hon. Cecil Mwambe, they were received by the Nigerian High Commission in Abuja to attend the Commonwealth Women Parliamentarians event on ending gender-based violence and ensuring justice for women and girls.

In 2026, Makamba led the Tanzanian delegation at India Energy Week (IEW 2026) on strategic investment and leveraging technologies.
