= Naghenjwa Kaboyoka =

Tanzanian politician

Honourable Naghenjwa Kaboyoka MP

Member of Parliament for Same East
- In office 2015–2020
- Preceded by: Anne Malecela
- Succeeded by: Anne Malecela

Personal details
- Born: 8 August 1949 (age 76) Kilimanjaro, Tanganyika
- Party: CHADEMA
- Education: Ashira Girls Secondary School
- Alma mater: Mzumbe University; International Institute of Social Studies
- Profession: Civil servant
- Website: www.same.go.tz

Naghenjwa Kaboyoka (born 8 August 1949) is a Tanzanian politician belonging to the opposition Chama cha Demokrasia na Maendeleo (CHADEMA) party. She is a Member of Parliament for Same East.

== Background and education ==
Kaboyoka was born on August 8, 1949. She completed her schooling from the Ashira Girls Secondary School in 1968. In 1971, she received a certificate from Dar es Salaam Technical College. In 1974, she completed a certification program the Civil Service Training Institute in Dar es Salaam. She went on to receive an advanced diploma from the Institute of Development and Management-Mzumbe in 1978. She received her Master of Arts degree in 1986 from the International Institute of Social Studies in The Hague. Kaboyoka had a long career in the public sector - for the Tanzanian government as well as international development agencies. Between 2000 and 2015, she was the executive chairperson of the Woyege Trust Fund.

== Political career ==
Kaboyoka became involved with the ruling Chama Cha Mapinduzi party in 1977 and served in a number of party roles until 1997.

Kaboyoka later joined CHADEMA. She was the party candidate in the 2005 and 2010 elections for the Same East constituency, losing both times to Anne Malecela. In the 2015 Tanzanian general election Kaboyoka and Malencela faced off for the third time. This time, Kaboyoka won by over 3000 votes.

Kaboyoka was appointed by the Speaker to the parliamentary Public Accounts Committee. The committee serves as a watchdog overseeing expenditure of public money and the implementation of the national budget.
