= Grace Tendega =

Tanzanian politician

Honourable Grace Victor Tendega MP

Member of Parliament
- Incumbent
- Assumed office November 2020
- Preceded by: Special Seats
- Succeeded by: Special Seats
- Constituency: Women Rep

Personal details
- Born: Grace Victor Tendega; 5 February 1967 (age 59) Iringa Region, Tanzania
- Party: CHADEMA
- Education: Gangilonga Primary School; Lugalo Secondary School
- Alma mater: Butimba Teachers College; Open University of Tanzania; University of Dar es Salaam

Grace Victor Tendega (born 5 February 1967) is a Tanzanian politician and a member of the CHADEMA political party. She was elected as a member of the Special Seats as women representative and serves as member of parliament since 2020.
