= Maimuna Mtanda =

Tanzanian politician

Honorable Maimuna Mtanda MP

Member of Parliament
- Incumbent
- Assumed office 2020
- Preceded by: Rashidi Ajali Ahkbar
- Constituency: Newala Rural Constituency

Personal details
- Born: Maimuna Salum Mtanda; January 9, 1968 (age 58) Lindi Region, Tanzania
- Party: Party of the Revolution
- Education: Ndanda Secondary School; Mtwara Teachers' Training College
- Alma mater: University of Dar es Salaam; Open University of Tanzania

Maimuna Salum Mtanda (born January 9, 1986), is a Tanzanian politician who presently serves as a Chama Cha Mapinduzi's Member of Parliament for Newala Rural Constituency since November 2020.
