= Juliana Shonza =

Tanzanian politician

Honourable Juliana Daniel Shonza MP
- President: Samia Suluhu Hassan
- Deputy: Former Deputy Minister for Information, Culture, Arts and Sports 2017-2020
- Succeeded by: Pauline Gekul
- Constituency: Women Special Seats Songwe Region

Member of Parliament
- Incumbent
- Assumed office 2015
- Preceded by: Mary Machuche Mwanjelwa
- Constituency: Women Special Seats

Personal details
- Born: 23 April 1987 (age 39) Mbozi Songwe
- Party: CCM
- Other political affiliations: CHADEMA (past)
- Education: The University of Dodoma, The University of Dar es salaam

Juliana Daniel Shonza (born 23 April 1987) is a Tanzanian politician and member of the ruling Chama Cha Mapinduzi (CCM) party. She is the current Member of Parliament having been appointed to special seats reserved for women.

== Background and education ==
Juliana Daniel Shonza was born on 23 April 1987 in Songwe Region. She completed her schooling from Sinde Primary School in 2001, Kibasila Secondary School in 2005 and Dakawa High School in 2008. Thereafter she graduated her first Bachelor on Sociology from 2008 to 2011 and Master's degree on Sociology from 2013 to 2015 from the University of Dar es Salaam and the University of Dodoma. respectively

== Political career ==
Shonza became involved in politics while she was at the University of Dar es Salaam. She jointly founded the Chadema Students Organization (CHASO) at the University of Dar es salaam in 2010. She went on to serve as the Vice Chairperson of National Youth Council of Chadema (BAVICHA). In 2013 she moved to Chama Cha Mapinduzi where she was appointed to the post of Assistant Secretary of Motivation at the CCM headquarters. During the general elections of 2015 and 2020 Shonza was appointed as a member of Tanzanian Parliament through women special seats to serve for 2015-2020 and 2020-2025.

In 2017, she was appointed as a Deputy Minister in the Ministry for Information, Culture, Arts and Sports by President John Magufuli during the ministerial cabinet reshuffles he made on 9 October 2017. She served this position from 2017 to 2020.
