= Departmental assistant =

In the Canadian government, a departmental assistant is a civil servant in a department, assigned to work in the office of a minister. The departmental assistant is the principal liaison between the minister, the minister's personal political staff, and the department. The senior civil servant in charge of administering the department is usually titled "deputy minister".

A departmental assistant is drawn from the upper-middle management of the department, being classified at either the top of the second highest classification group or on the bottom two rungs of the highest classification group.

Contrary to other staff within the minister's office, who are hired by the minister and are political advisors, the departmental assistant remains a non-partisan civil servant and can only provide non-political advice. The departmental assistant keeps all official documents within the minister's office and assists the minister and his or her staff in connecting with the right officials within the department as required.

== See also ==
- Private secretary
