= Anne Malecela =

Tanzanian politician (born 1948)

Honourable Anne Malecela MP
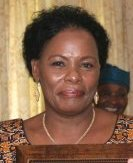

MP for Same East
- In office 2005–2015
- Preceded by: Daniel Yona
- Succeeded by: Naghenjwa Kaboyoka
- Incumbent
- Assumed office 2020
- Preceded by: Naghenjwa Kaboyoka

Personal details
- Born: 9 January 1956 (age 70) Same District, Kilimanjaro Region, Tanganyika Territory
- Party: CCM
- Spouse: John Malecela
- Education: Chang'ombe TTC; Open University of Tanzania (BCom)
- Profession: Teacher

Anne Kilango Malecela (born 9 January 1956) is a Tanzanian politician belonging to the ruling Chama Cha Mapinduzi (CCM) party. She was Member of Parliament for Same East constituency between 2005 and 2015, Deputy Education Minister, and Regional Commissioner for Shinyanga Region for one month in 2016.

== Background and education ==
Malecela was born on January 9, 1956. She completed her schooling at the Shycom Secondary School in 1976. In 1979, she received a teaching diploma from the Chang'ombe Teachers' Training College. She worked as a teacher for four years and then worked in accountancy roles for various airlines between until 1994. Between 1994 and 2000, she was an entrepreneur. While a Member of Parliament, she completed an Honours Bachelor of Commerce degree from the Open University of Tanzania. Between 1997 and 2003, she served as functionary for the ruling CCM party Malecela is married to the former Prime Minister John Malecela.

== Career ==
Malencela was Member of Parliament for three terms as a member of CCM. In 2000, she was appointed to a seat reserved for women by the President. In 2005, she ran against then Energy Minister Daniel Yona in the primary to represent CCM in the Same East constituency. She won by a margin of 286 votes to 60. She went on to win from Same East in both 2005 and 2010. In both races, Malecela faced and defeated CHADEMA candidate Naghenjwa Kaboyoka. In the 2015 Tanzanian general election Malecela and Kaboyoka faced off for the third time. This time, Kaboyoka won by over 3000 votes.

Malecela was appointed the Deputy Education and Vocational Training Minister in President Jakaya Kikwete's cabinet in January 2015 and served in this role until her defeat.

In March 2016, Malencela was appointed Regional Commissioner for Shinyanga Region by President John Magufuli. She was one of many defeated lawmakers to receive this post in a major reshuffle. However, she was fired by the President only a month later in an anti-corruption drive. Malecela had denied that there was anyone on the government payroll that did not actually work for the government in her region. An investigation found there were 45 such workers.
