= Agnesta Lambert Kaiza =

Tanzanian politician

Honourable Agnesta Lambert Kaiza MP

Member of Parliament
- Incumbent
- Assumed office November 2020
- Preceded by: Special Seats
- Succeeded by: Special Seats
- Constituency: Women Rep

Personal details
- Born: 17 November 1977 (age 48) Tanzania
- Party: CHADEMA

Agnesta Lambert Kaiza (born November 17, 1977) is a Tanzanian politician and a member of the CHADEMA political party. She was elected as a member of the Special Seats as women representative and serves as member of parliament since 2020.
