= Priscus Tarimo =

Tanzanian politician and businessman

Honorable Priscus Tarimo MP

Member of Parliament
- Incumbent
- Assumed office 2020
- Preceded by: Jeffery Michael
- Constituency: Moshi Urban

Personal details
- Born: Priscus Jacob Tarimo Kilimanjaro Region
- Citizenship: Tanzanian
- Party: Chama Cha Mapinduzi
- Education: University of Dar es Salaam

Priscus Jacob Tarimo (born in Kilimanjaro) is a Tanzanian businessman and politician who was a former Ward Councillor for Kilimanjaro ward and presently serves as a Chama Cha Mapinduzi's Member of Parliament for Moshi Urban Constituency since November 2020. He is also a board member of Moshi Urban Water Supply and Sanitation Authority (MUSWA).

== See also ==
- Adolf Mkenda
- Irene Tarimo
