= Mary Machuche Mwanjelwa =

Tanzanian politician (born 1965)

Honourable Mary Machuche Mwanjelwa MP

Deputy Minister of Agriculture
- Incumbent
- Assumed office 9 October 2017 Serving with George Simbachawene
- President: John Magufuli

Member of Parliament
- Incumbent
- Assumed office November 2010
- Constituency: None (Special Seat)

Personal details
- Born: August 27, 1965 (age 61)
- Party: CCM
- Education: St. Augustine University of Tanzania (Master of Science); Open University of Tanzania (Doctor of Philosophy)
- Profession: Politician

Mary Machuche Mwanjelwa (born 27 August 1965) is a Tanzanian politician belonging to the ruling Chama Cha Mapinduzi party and a special seat Member of Parliament since 2010. She was the Deputy Minister of Agriculture, and as the deputy minister of State in the President's Office responsible for Public Service and Good Governance.

== Background and education ==
She was born in the present-day Mbeya Region, on 27 August 1965. She attended Muungano Primary School. She then transferred to Sangu Secondary School for her middle school studies. For her high school education she attended Siha Secondary School. In 2009 she graduated from St. Augustine University of Tanzania, with a Master of Science degree. Later, she was awarded a Doctor of Philosophy degree by the Open University of Tanzania.

== Employment history ==
From 2000 until 2001, she was employed as a Manager at Two Wings Pegasus Tanzania. She then transferred to "Placer Dome Tanzania", a gold mine belonging to Barrick Gold, as a manager, serving in that capacity from 2001 until 2005. From 2006 until 2010, she served as a corporate director at PSI Tanzania.

== Political career ==
According to her profile at the website of the Tanzanian parliament, Mary Machuche Mwanjelwa has been active in the party politics of the Chama Cha Mapinduzi dating back to 2006. She was elected to the Parliament of Tanzania in 2010, serving as a Special Seats member until 2015. During that time-frame she served as a Board Member of the National Institute for Medical Research (NIMR), from 2013 until 2015.

In 2015, she was re-elected to parliament. In 2016, he served in three capacities (a) as the chairperson of the Lands, Natural Resources and Tourism Committee of the Parliament of Tanzania (b) as the Presiding Officer of the Parliament of Tanzania and (c)as a member of the Stearing Committee of the Parliament of Tanzania.

On 9 October 2017, she was sworn in by president John Magufuli, as the Deputy Minister of Agriculture.

== See also ==
- Cabinet of Tanzania
