= University of Dodoma =

Public university in Tanzania

Coordinates: 6°12′53″S 35°49′29″E

The University of Dodoma
- Chuo Kikuu cha Dodoma (Swahili)
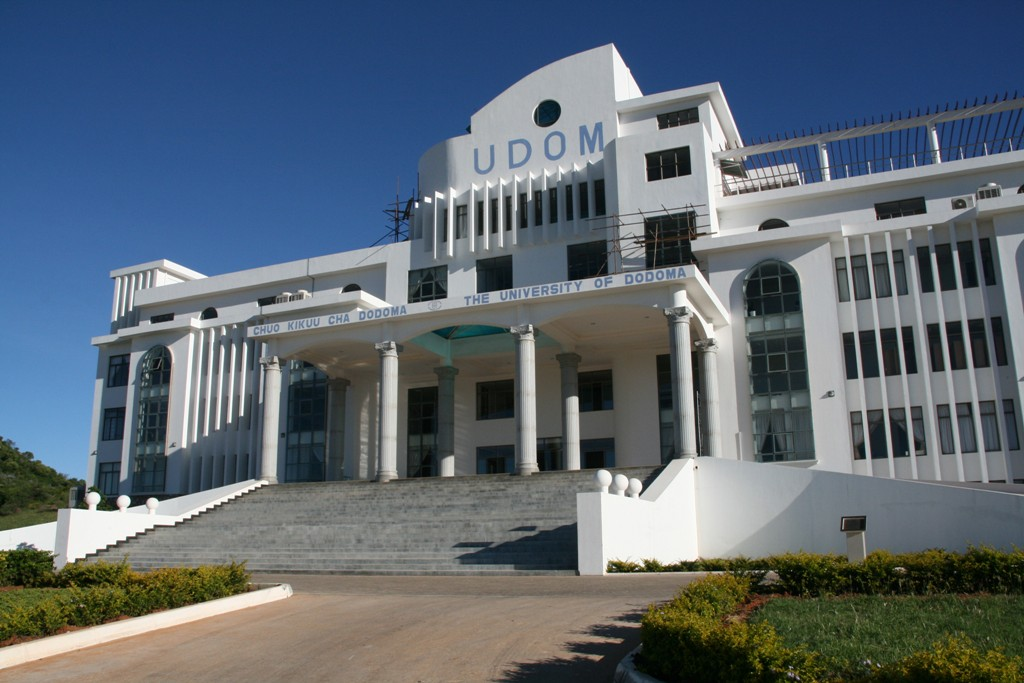
- Central Administration building
- Motto: Embracing Knowledge
- Type: Public
- Established: 2007; 19 years ago
- Chairman: Prof. Rwekaza Mukandala
- Chancellor: Prof. Ibrahim Juma
- Vice-Chancellor: Prof. Lughano Jeremy Kusiluka
- Location: Dodoma, Tanzania
- Campus: Chimwaga (Rural)
- Website: University Website

The University of Dodoma (UDOM) is a public university located in Dodoma, the country's capital in central Tanzania. Building is taking place on a 6,000-hectare site in the Chimwaga area about 8 kilometres (5.0 mi) east of downtown Dodoma.

The University of Dodoma was formally established in March 2007 following the signing of the Charter by the President of the United Republic of Tanzania Jakaya Mrisho Kikwete. The first academic programmes commenced in September 2007. Currently UDOM is the fastest growing university within the country, it is bigger than any other university within the country, and it is praised for producing competent and qualified candidates capable of competing in job markets.

In line with Tanzania's Development Vision 2025, the University of Dodoma, when fully operational, will be able to enroll 50,000 students. This is more than triple the size of the University of Dar es Salaam when UDOM becomes fully operational. Up to now it is 80% complete and is already two times bigger than the size and capacity of The University of Dar es Salaam.

The University of Dodoma currently has seven colleges: College of Earth Science, College of Natural and Mathematical Sciences, College of Informatics and Virtual Education, College of Education, College of Humanities and Social Sciences, College of Health and Allied Science and College of Business Studies and Law, in recently there was also establishment of newly academic institute within college of humanities and social science UDOM named institute of Development studies(IDS) charged with responsibility of strengthening professionals within the field of Development studies.

The university offers various undergraduate and postgraduate programmes.

In the college of education, several undergraduate programmes are provided with focus given to the issues facing education sector in Tanzania and abroad. There are 11 different bachelor's degrees in the college of education.

The college offers programmes both undergraduate and postgraduate in areas such as computer science, computer engineering, telecommunication engineering, information security, health and business information systems and many other programmes.

College of humanities and social sciences offers programmes relating to geography and environmental studies, languages, history, political science, international relation, development studies, theatre and film, art and design and many more programmes.

College of business studies and law provides various programmes in the field of business studies and law. Several degree programmes are offered in this college, which include degree in accounting, finance, business administration, human resource management, international business, procurement and logistic management, information system management, economics, economic and sociology, economic and statistics and law.

In the college of Earth sciences programmes such as petroleum engineering, mineral processing engineering, mining, geology, geo-informatics, hydrology and environmental engineering are being offered.

The College of Natural and Mathematical Sciences offers various degree programmes in the field of Sciences and Mathematics. There are four Departments in this college, which are Department of Physics which offers programme namely Physics, Department of Mathematics and Statistics which offers programmes such as Mathematics, Statistics, Mathematics and Statistics and Actuarial Statistics, the Department of Chemistry offers programmes known as Chemistry and also Department of Biology which offers programmes in Biology, Aquaculture and Aquatic sciences as well as Biotechnology and Bioinformatics.

The college of health and allied sciences provides programmes like Medicine, Nursing and pharmacy. In postgraduate level students specialize in areas such as surgery, internal medicine, obstetric and gynaecology, microbiology and immunology, paediatric and child health as well as pathology. In the school of nursing and public health, programmes such as paediatric nursing, nursing education, public health and midwifery are offered.

Notable alumni include Tanzania politicians, Members of Parliament and other leaders such as Muhammed Seif khatib, who was a first person to be awarded PhD in the university, Hon. Doto Biteko who is currently serving as Deputy Prime Minister of Tanzania, Hon Selemani Jafo, Juliana Shonza, Dr Ombeni Msuya, Dr Fredrick Ishengoma and so many others.

== Gallery ==
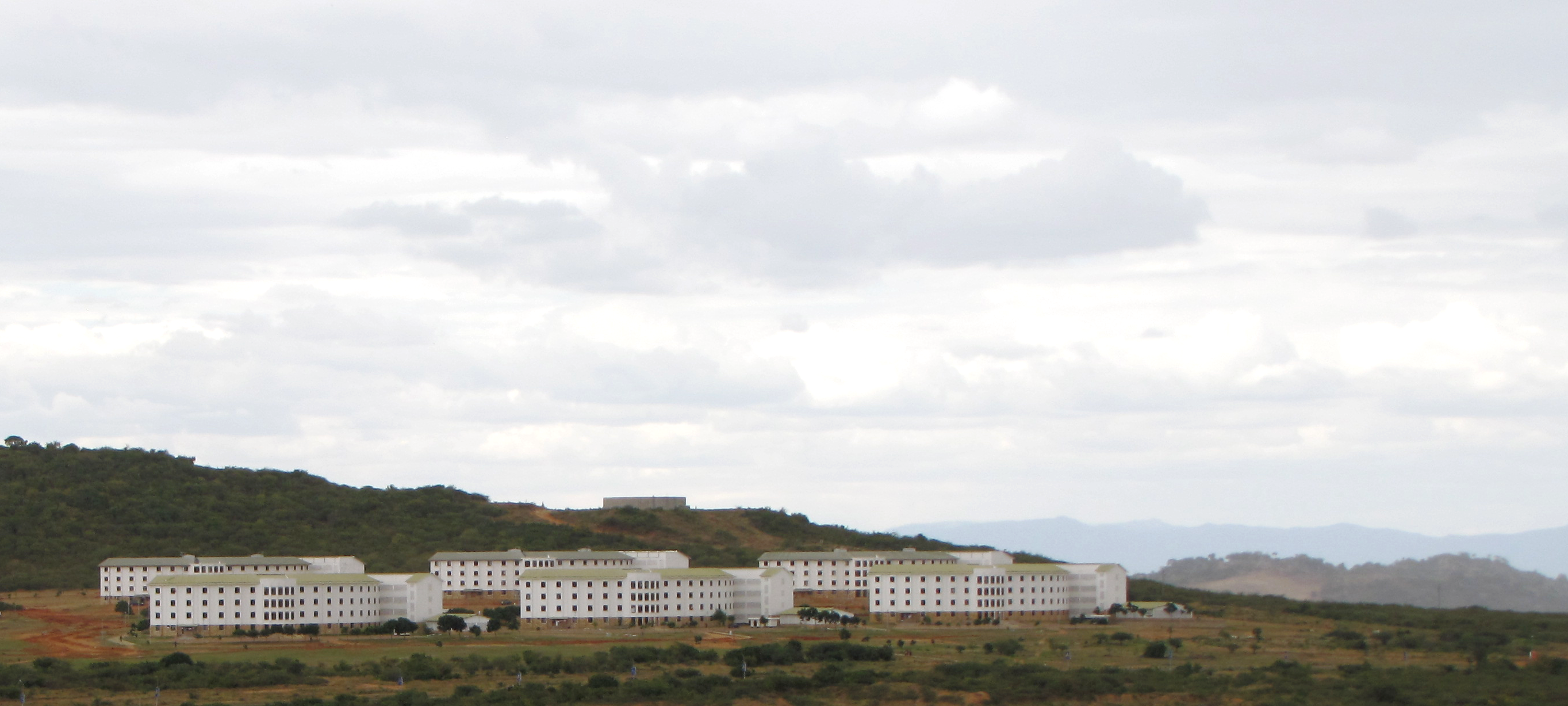
The Dormitories of the University of Dodoma in Dodoma, Tanzania

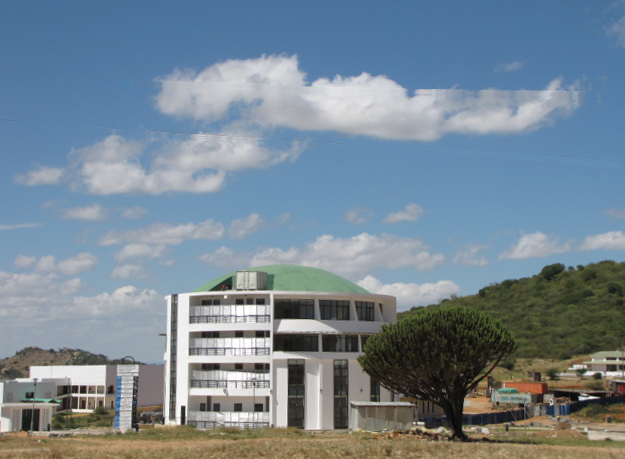
UDOM College of Informatics and Virtual Education
