= Stella Martin Manyanya =

Tanzanian politician

Honourable Stella Martin Manyanya MP

Deputy Minister of Industries, Trade and Investment
- Incumbent
- Assumed office 9 October 2017

Ministry of Education, Technology and Vocational Training
- In office 5 November 2015 – 9 October 2017

Member of Parliament for Nyasa

Personal details
- Born: August 4, 1962 (age 64) Nyasa, Tanganyika (now Tanzania)
- Party: CCM
- Education: University of Dar es Salaam (Master of Science in Electrical Engineering) (Postgraduate Diploma in Electrical Engineering); Norwegian University of Science and Technology (Bachelor of Science in Electrical Engineering) Open University of Tanzania

Stella Martin Manyanya (born 4 August 1962) is a Tanzanian CCM politician and Member of Parliament for Nyasa constituency since 2010. In October 2017, she was appointed as a deputy minister of Industries, Trade and Investment.

== Background and education ==
Manyanya attended Nambingi Primary School, for her first year of elementary school, from 1969 until 1970. She then transferred to Maguu Primary School, finishing her elementary education there in 1975. From 1976 to 1979, she attended Songea Girls Secondary School, in Songea, for her Ordinary Level Secondary School studies. She has university qualifications in electrical engineering, obtained from the Norwegian University of Science and Technology and the University of Dar es Salaam.

== Work history ==
Her first job was at Pugu Kaolin Mines Limited (now known as STAMICO), where she worked as an electrical technician from 1983 until 1987. From 1992 to 2005, she worked as an electrical engineer, for Tanzania Electric Supply Company Limited (TANESCO), the Tanzania electricity monopoly, responsible for electricity generation, electricity transmission and electricity distribution. At TENESCO, she supervised planning, line construction and operations.

== Political career ==
Manyanya entered parliament in 2005 on the CCM political party ticket. During her first term in parliament, she served on the parliamentary committee on Investment, Energy and Minerals. She also served on the National Executive Committee (NEC) during that time. She was reelected in 2010. During her second term, she served as the chairperson of the parliamentary committee on Industry and Trade, from 2010 until 2011. Also during the same term, she was a member of the parliamentary committee on constitutional affairs, good governance and local government.

From 2011 until 2015, she concurrently served as the regional commissioner for Rukwa Region. She also served as a member of the University Council of the University of Dar es Salaam, and as a member of the parliamentary committee on Defence and Security.

She was re-elected to parliament for the third consecutive time in 2015. In 2015, she was appointed Deputy Ministry of Education, Technology and Vocational Training, serving in that capacity until October 2017 when she was appointed as a deputy minister for Industries and Trade.

== See also ==
- Cabinet of Tanzania
