= Mwalimu Nyerere Memorial Academy =

University in Dar es Salaam Region, Tanzania

- Chuo Cha Kumbukumbu Ya Mwalimu Nyerere (Swahili)
- Former names: Kivukoni College, Kivukoni Ideological College, Kivukoni Academy of Social Sciences
- Type: Public
- Established: 1961; 65 years ago
- Affiliations: Tanganyika African National Union
- Rector: Shadrack Mwakalila
- Location: Kigamboni District, Dar es Salaam Region, Tanzania
- Campus: Urban
- Website: www.mnma.ac.tz

Mwalimu Nyerere Memorial Academy (MNMA) is an undergraduate university dating back to the dawn of Tanzania's independence in 1961. It is located in Kigamboni District of Dar es Salaam Region, Tanzania. It took over the assets and functions of the former Kivukoni Academy of Social Sciences.

== Historical background ==
The Mwalimu Nyerere Memorial Academy emerged from an institution once called Kivukoni College.

=== Phase 1 ===
In February 1958, the National Conference of TANU which was held in Tabora passed a Resolution to establish a college for adults in the lines of Ruskin College in Oxford. The college was to be a tool for spreading understanding of social, political and economic problems facing underdeveloped countries such as Tanganyika among people who were likely to become leaders in the newly independent country but who did not have qualifications necessary to enter educational institutions. The Adult College was formally established on 29 July 1961 as a private company under Companies Ordinance (Cap 212) and named Kivukoni College. While inaugurating Kivukoni College, Mwalimu Julius Kambarage Nyerere, the President of TANU and the Prime Minister of Tanganyika by then had this to say about the name.

“The name of this College is significant. It is not just the question of the site being of crossing place physically. Tanganyika itself is at the crossing place now; on December ninth, we assume new and great crossing place now; on December 9th, we assume new and great journey, and every student must become part of that crew. But first he/she has his/her own crossing to make; a crossing to wide understanding and to new opportunities for service”.

Regarding the adult college, he said: “…Kivukoni College is not intended to be a College for an Elite, it is intended to make a contribution to the development of all the people. To come here as a student is to be given a wonderful opportunity and a privilege. The responsibility is proportionately great. If any student ever tried to divorce himself/herself from the people who indirectly sent him/her here he/she would be abusing the privilege but I do not believe that will happen. The graduates of Kivukoni must be like the yeast in a loaf, effective because it cannot be isolated, its presence being known by the work it had done….”

The college opened with only 43 students. Subjects taught were political science, history, sociology, literature, geography, administration, law, modern languages plus other relevant subjects.

=== Phase 2 ===
In 1971 Kivukoni College was transformed into an Ideological College. The college was considered best suited to inculcate the party ideology of Socialism and self-reliance. The main functions of Kivukoni Ideological College were:

- To spread and reinforce the ideology of the Party (TANU) through interpreting, teaching, analysing and defending it and in so doing raise the level of understanding of leaders and masses at large.
- To be a source of ideas to help the Party promote the development of Tanzania.
- To be a source of information and an advisory organ on various issues regarding the ideology of the Party.

Kivukoni Ideological College had eight zonal colleges, namely Zanzibar, Lushoto, Murutunguru, Hombolo, Msaginya, Mahiwa, Kihinga and Ilonga. They offered the following subjects:

1. Ideology and Politics
2. History – The History of the Party
3. Political Economy
4. Management and Administration
5. People's Combat and
6. Social Science Research Methodology.

All zonal colleges except Zanzibar were closed and handed-over to the Tanzania Government in 1992, at the end of the one party state and the adoption of a multi-party system from 1 July 1992.

=== Phase 3 ===
The college was transformed into an academic institution and renamed Kivukoni Academy of Social Sciences (KASS).

The Memorandum and Articles of Association which established Kivukoni Academy of Social Sciences gave mandate to the academy to undertake the following functions:

- To take over the assets and liabilities of Kivukoni College
- To provide instruction to students in various branches of Social Sciences relevant to the promotion and advancement of social, political, scientific and technological development of a developing country.
- To provide and assist in the study of Social Sciences and allied subjects through classes, or any other means suitable to that end and cooperate with any bodies that are or may be doing similar or connected work.
- To carry out and or sponsor research activities in various branches of Social Sciences and allied subjects and provide consultancy services.
- To award certificates, diplomas, testimonials, transcripts in a manner that shows the results of examinations administered by KASS.*To administer any scholarships or other monies which may become available to KASS, and to conduct tests in a manner likely to assist in the selection of students for whom KASS is designed.

In terms of training programmes, KASS offered a one-year Certificate in Youth Work and two year Diploma Programmes in Social Studies, Economic Development and Gender Issues in Development.

=== Phase 4 ===
A national need for expansion of higher education resulted in Kivukoni Academy being made a public higher learning institution. The Mwalimu Nyerere Memorial Academy (MNMA) was established by an Act of Parliament in 2005. The new name was to honour and recognize the contribution of Nyerere as the father of the nation and the founder of Kivukoni College. The academy is regarded as a prestigious home-grown Tanzanian institution, largely focused on education and training and with some research conducted by individual staff members, many of whom hold PhDs from local and international universities.

== Functions of the academy ==
The academy has the following functions:

- To provide facilities for study and training programmes in social sciences, leadership and continuing education and allied Sciences;
- To engage in research and development in the disciplines specified in and to evaluate the results achieved by the academy training

programmes;

- To provide consultancy services to the public and private sectors in specified fields as prescribed in Act No. 6 of 2005;
- To sponsor, arrange, facilitate and provide facilities for conferences, symposia, meetings, seminars and workshops for discussion of matters relating to social sciences, leadership and continuing education;
- To conduct examinations and grant awards of the academy as approved by the National Council for Technical Education.
- To arrange for publication and general dissemination of materials produced in connection with the work and activities of the academy.
- To engage in income generating activities for effective financing and promotion of entrepreneurship.
- To establish and foster close association with Universities and other institutions of higher education and promote international cooperation with similar institutions.
- To do all such acts and transactions as are in the opinion of the Governing Board expedient or necessary for the proper and efficient discharge of the functions of the academy.
- To perform such other functions as the Minister or the Governing Board may assign to the academy, or as are incidental or conducive to the exercise by the academy of all or any of the preceding functions.

The academy is a legal and viable institution which was awarded Full Registration and Full Accreditation at NTA Level 8 (Bachelor's degree level) with The National Council for Technical Education (NACTE) on 21 May 2002 and 30 November, 2005 respectively.

== Location ==
The Dar es Salaam campus is in Kivukoni (Kigamboni ward) in Temeke District, Dar es Salaam. Its location is along the shores of the Indian Ocean and one kilometre south of the Kigamboni side Ferry ghat. From Dar es Salaam city centre, one reaches the academy by two ways; either by driving through Kongowe which takes forty five minutes or by Pontoon which operates 24 hours on daily basis. The Pontoon ferries both people and vehicles and it takes about five minutes to cross the Magogoni Creek.

The Mwalimu Nyerere Memorial Academy in Zanzibar is in Bububu area in West Unguja District.

The main Academy site is protected from coastal erosion by a seawall, built with funding from the UNEP and the U.S.-based Adaptation Fund. The Ecologist journal (2019) questions why the academy buildings were favoured preferentially in coastal protection works, while more vulnerable locations are still exposed to storm surges and rising sea levels.

== Programmes ==
Degree Programmes:

- Bachelor's degree in management of social development
- Bachelor's Degree in human resource and Management of Social Development.
- Bachelor's Degree in Economics of Development.
- Bachelor's Degree in Gender and Development.
- Bachelor of education in geography and history
- Bachelor's degree of Education in Kiswahili and English Languages (BD.EKE) – full-time.
- Bachelor's degree of Education in Geography and Kiswahili (BD.EGK) – full-time
- Bachelor's degree of Education in Geography and English (BD.EGE) – full-time
- Bachelor's degree of Education in History and English (BD.EHE) – full-time
- bachelor's degree of education in History and kiswahili (BD.EKH)-FULL TIME

Diploma Programmes:

- Diploma in Social Studies
- Diploma in Economic Development
- Diploma in Gender Studies

Certificate Programme:

- Certificate in Youth Work
