= Esther Matiko =

Tanzanian politician (born 1976)

Esther Matiko (born November 24, 1976) is a Tanzanian politician. She is from the opposition Chama cha Demokrasia na Maendeleo CHADEMA party. She was a Member of Parliament for Tarime Urban. Since 2020 she is serving under women special seat member.

== Background and education ==
Matiko was born on November 24, 1976, at KIONGERA village Eastern Tarime. She joined Kiongera primary school in 1985 for her primary education, then Mwema secondary in 1992 and finished her secondary schooling in A-level at Nganza High School in 1998. She received her Bachelors of Science in Home Economics and Nutrition from the Sokoine University of Agriculture in 2002. In 2005, she completed her MBA from the University of Dar es Salaam. Between 2000 and 2006, she worked for a number of private companies. She was a lecturer at the University of Dar es Salaam between 2006 and 2016.

== Political career ==
Matiko has served as the Treasurer of CHADEMA's women wing BAWACHA since 2009. Matiko was appointed an MP in 2010 to a special seat reserved for women. In the 10th Parliament of Tanzania (2010-2015), she served on the public organization accounts and the public accounts committees in succession.

In 2015, she was selected to represent CHADEMA in the 2015 Tanzanian general election from the Tarime Urban constituency. She faced and defeated Chama Cha Mapinduzi candidate Michael Kembaki by a vote margin of 20,017 votes to 14,025. Matiko was appointed by the Speaker to the newly constituted parliamentary Public Investment Committee (PIC). PIC is a watchdog whose mission is to ensure that public investments are made and managed with prudence and based on sound commercial criteria. Matiko was appointed to shadow the Ministry of Natural Resources and Tourism by the Leader of the Opposition Freeman Mbowe in February 2016. She is part of a joint opposition shadow cabinet which includes members from CHADEMA, CUF and NCCR-Mageuzi
