= Mzumbe University =

Public university in Mzumbe, Tanzania

Coordinates: 6°53′29″S 37°33′37″E

- Chuo Kikuu cha Mzumbe (Swahili)
- Former names: Institute of Development Management (IDM-Mzumbe)
- Motto: Tujifunze kwa Maendeleo ya Watu (Swahili)
- Motto in English: Let us Study for the Development of the People
- Type: Public
- Established: 2001; 25 years ago
- Affiliations: AAU, ACU
- Chancellor: Ali Mohamed Shein
- Vice-Chancellor: Prof. William John Mwegoha
- Location: Morogoro, Mvomero, Tanzania
- Campus: Rural: Mzumbe Urban: Dar es Salaam Urban: Mbeya Urban: Tanga (To be established)
- Website: University website

Mzumbe University (MU; Swahili: Chuo Kikuu Mzumbe) is a public university in Mzumbe, Tanzania, near Morogoro. It was established in 2001.

== Academic units ==
Below are the academic units and their acronyms in brackets respectively;

1. School of Business (SoB)
2. School of Administration and Management (SOPAM)
3. Faculty of Law (FoL)
4. Faculty of Social Sciences (FSS)
5. Faculty of Science and Technology (FST)
6. Institute of Development Studies (IDS)
7. Directorate of Research, Publications and Postgraduate Studies (DRPS)

== Notable alumni ==
- Samia Suluhu Hassan, Politician and the 6th President of Tanzania
- Theddy Ladislaus
