= Demographics of Tanzania =

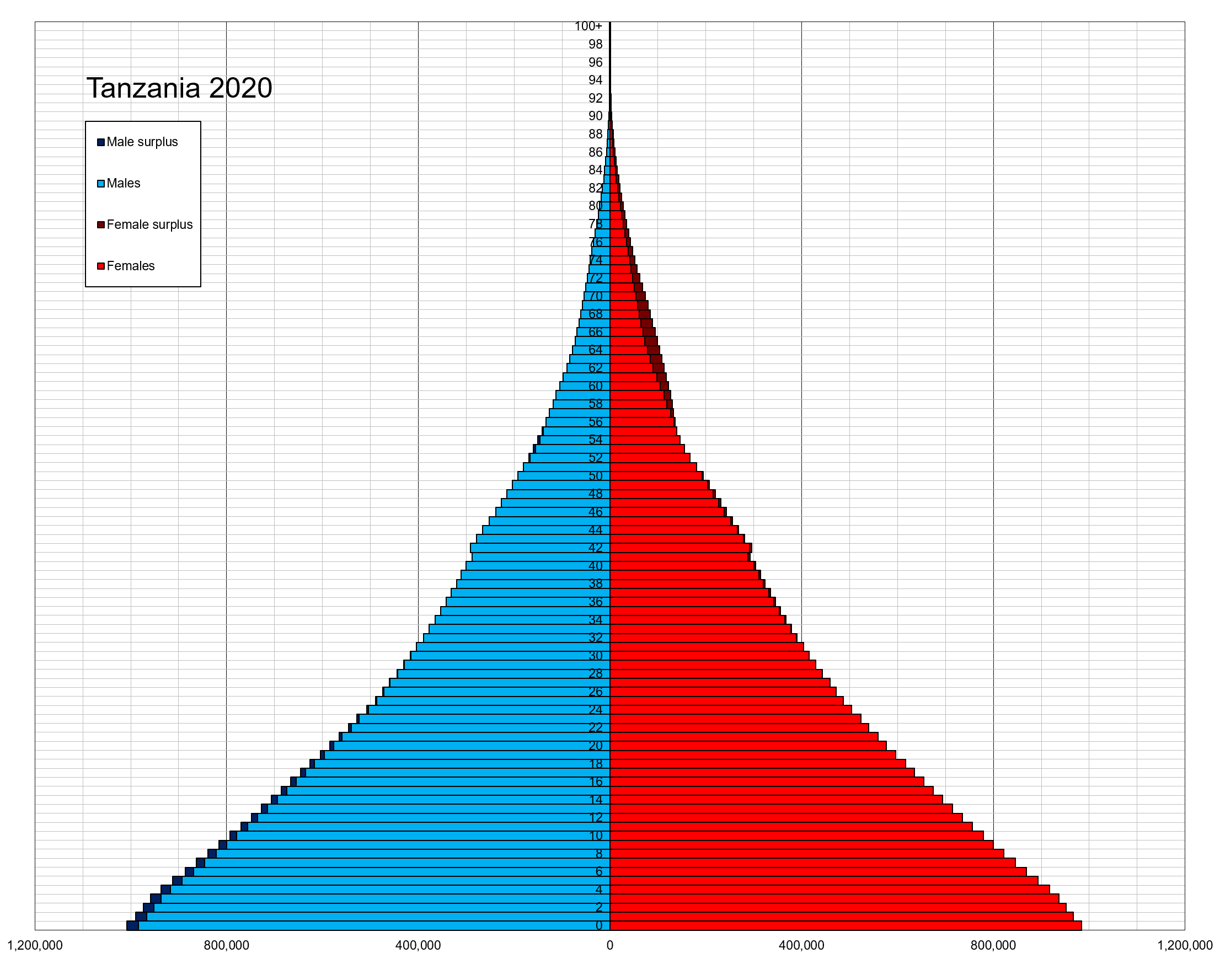
- Population pyramid of Tanzania in 2020
- Population: 63,852,892
- Growth rate: 2.78% (2022 est.)
- Birth rate: 33.3 births/1,000 population
- Death rate: 5.09 deaths/1,000 population
- Life expectancy: 70.19 years
  - male: 68.42 years
  - female: 72.02 years
- Fertility rate: 4.39 children
- Infant mortality: 30.87 deaths/1,000 live births
- Net migration rate: -0.41 migrant(s)/1,000 population

Sex ratio
- Total: 1 male(s)/female (2022 est.)
- At birth: 1.03 male(s)/female

Nationality
- Nationality: Tanzanian

Language
- Official: Kiswahili or Swahili, English

Demographic features of the population of Tanzania include population density, ethnicity, education level, health of the populace, economic status, religious affiliations, and other aspects of the population.

The population distribution in Tanzania is extremely uneven. Most people live on the northern border or the eastern coast, with much of the remainder of the country being sparsely populated. Density varies from 12 per square kilometre (31/sq mi) in the Katavi Region to 3,133 per square kilometre (8,110/sq mi) in Dar es Salaam. Approximately 70 percent of the population is rural, although this percentage has been declining since at least 1967. Dar es Salaam is the de facto capital and largest city. Dodoma, located in the centre of Tanzania, is the de jure capital, although action to move government buildings to Dodoma has stalled.

The population consists of about 125 ethnic groups. The Sukuma, Nyamwezi, Chagga, and Haya peoples have more than 1 million members each.

Over 100 languages are spoken in Tanzania, making it the most linguistically diverse country in East Africa. Among the languages spoken in Tanzania are all four of Africa's language families: Bantu, Cushitic, Nilotic, and Khoisan. Swahili and English are Tanzania's official languages. Swahili belongs to the Bantu branch of the Niger-Congo family. The Sandawe people speak a language that may be related to the Khoe languages of Botswana and Namibia, while the language of the Hadzabe people, although it has similar click consonants, is arguably a language isolate. The language of the Iraqw people is Cushitic. Other languages are Indian languages and Portuguese (spoken by Goans and Mozambicans).

Non-Africans residing on the mainland and Zanzibar account for 1 percent of the total population. The Asian community including Hindus, Sikhs, Shi'a and Sunni Muslims, Parsis, and Goans, exceed 60,000. An estimated 70,000 Arabs and 20,000 Europeans (90 percent of which are from the British diaspora) reside in Tanzania. Over 100,000 people living in Tanzania are of Asian or European ancestry.

Based on 1999–2003 data, over 74,000 Tanzanian-born people were living in Organisation for Economic Co-operation and Development countries, with 32,630 residing in the United Kingdom; 19,960 in Canada; 12,225 in the United States; 1,714 in Australia; 1,180 in the Netherlands; and 1,012 in Sweden.

== Population ==
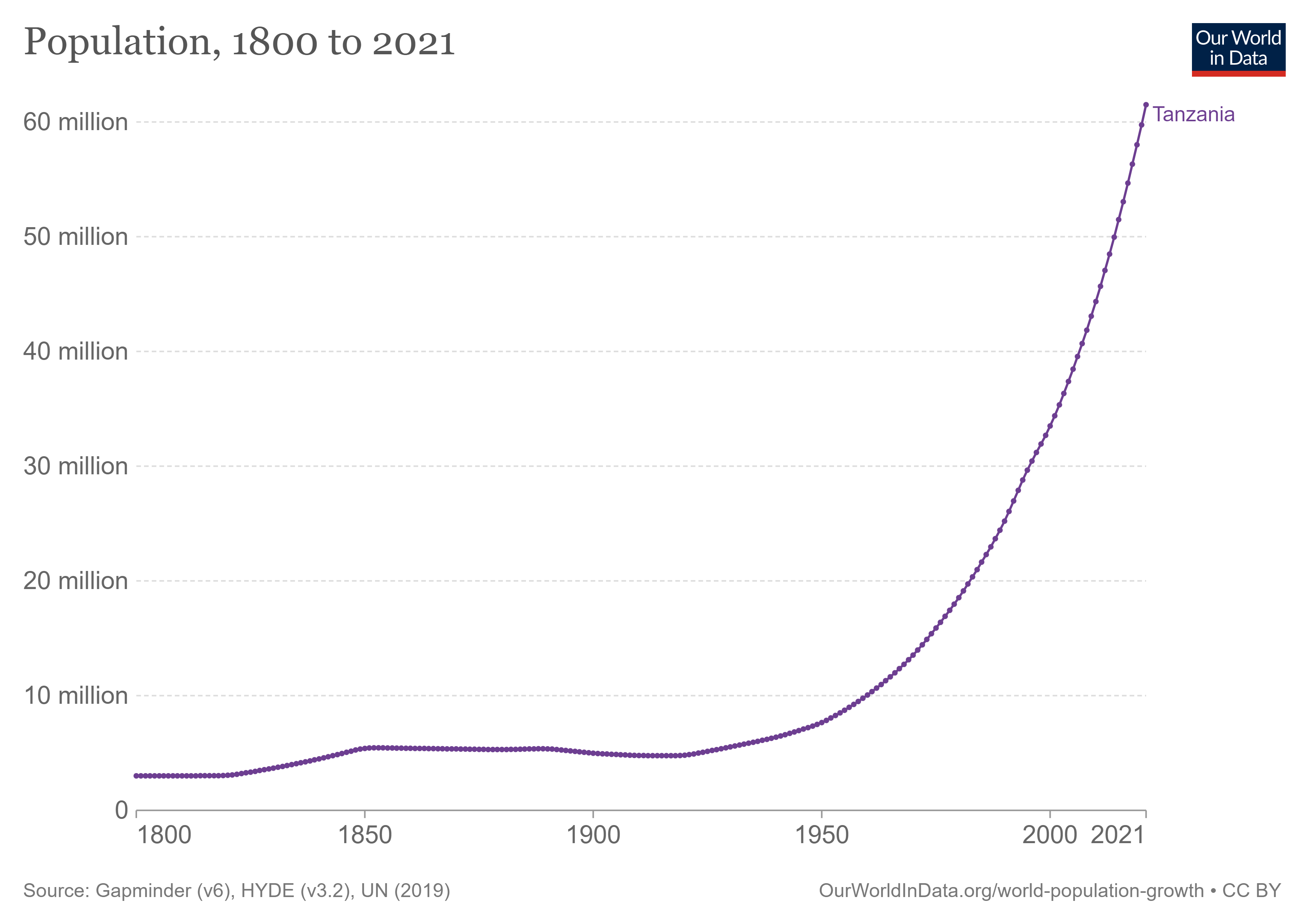
Demographics of Tanzania, Data of Our World in Data, year 2022; Number of inhabitants in millions.

According to the 2012 census, the total population was 44,928,923 compared to 12,313,469 in 1967, resulting in an annual growth rate of 2.9 percent. The under 15 age group represented 44.1 percent of the population, with 35.5 percent being in the 15–35 age group, 52.2 percent being in the 15–64 age group, and 3.8 percent being older than 64.

According to the 2012 revision of the World Population Prospects, children below the age of 15 constituted 44.8 percent of the total population, with 52.0 percent aged 15–64 and 3.1 percent aged 65 or older.

	Total population	Population aged 0–14 (%)	Population aged 15–64 (%)	Population aged 65+ (%)
1950	7,650,000	46.0	51.8	2.2
1955	8,741,000	45.7	52.0	2.3
1960	10,074,000	45.8	51.8	2.4
1965	11,683,000	45.8	51.7	2.4
1970	13,605,000	46.2	51.3	2.5
1975	15,978,000	46.4	51.1	2.6
1980	18,687,000	46.5	50.8	2.6
1985	21,850,000	46.4	51.0	2.7
1990	25,485,000	46.0	51.3	2.7
1995	29,944,000	45.3	51.9	2.8
2000	34,021,000	44.8	52.3	2.9
2005	38,824,000	44.6	52.4	3.0
2010	44,793,000	44.8	52.0	3.1

View source data.
View source data.
View source data.
View source data.

=== Structure of the population ===
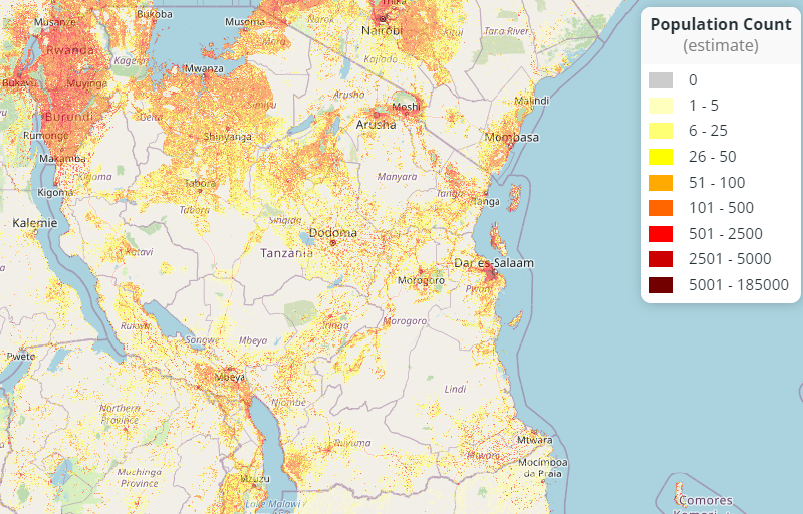
Population density (2022)

Old Tanzanian woman in Arusha, 2008.

Structure of the population (01.07.2013) (Estimates) (Projections based on the 2002 Population Census.):

Age group	Male	Female	Total	%
Total	23 267 957	23 864 623	47 132 580	100
0-4	4 191 004	4 121 103	8 312 107	17.64
5-9	3 608 891	3 551 955	7 160 846	15.19
10-14	2 735 494	2 728 687	5 464 181	11.59
15-19	2 494 983	2 490 960	4 985 943	10.58
20-24	2 179 173	2 160 970	4 340 143	9.21
25-29	1 730 600	1 754 007	3 484 607	7.39
30-34	1 289 114	1 563 083	2 852 197	6.05
35-39	1 207 182	1 394 428	2 601 610	5.52
40-44	1 032 605	1 088 697	2 121 302	4.50
45-49	770 149	797 868	1 568 017	3.33
50-54	604 621	629 580	1 234 201	2.62
55-59	422 141	459 343	881 484	1.87
60-64	347 604	387 334	734 938	1.56
65-69	223 365	243 517	466 882	0.99
70-74	179 960	207 795	387 755	0.82
75-79	115 076	130 796	245 872	0.52
80+	135 995	154 500	290 495	0.62
Age group	Male	Female	Total	Percent
0-14	10 535 389	10 401 745	20 937 134	44.42
15-64	12 078 172	12 726 270	24 804 442	52.63
65+	654 396	736 608	1 391 004	2.95

Population Estimates by Sex and Age Group (01.VII.2020) (Projections based on the 2012 Population Census.):

Age group	Male	Female	Total	%
Total	28 229 599	29 408 029	57 637 628	100
0–4	4 972 289	4 878 738	9 851 027	17.09
5–9	4 013 263	3 968 953	7 982 216	13.85
10–14	3 582 899	3 568 790	7 151 689	12.41
15–19	3 014 118	3 041 114	6 055 232	10.51
20–24	2 656 362	2 674 122	5 330 484	9.25
25–29	2 042 003	2 333 256	4 375 259	7.59
30–34	1 642 384	1 971 517	3 613 901	6.27
35–39	1 464 246	1 732 225	3 196 471	5.55
40–44	1 241 782	1 330 290	2 572 072	4.46
45–49	1 032 732	1 113 792	2 146 524	3.72
50–54	758 908	762 341	1 521 249	2.64
55–59	605 139	713 099	1 318 238	2.29
60–64	411 344	406 728	818 072	1.42
65-69	312 655	351 895	664 550	1.15
70-74	199 196	211 801	410 997	0.71
75-79	141 944	180 717	322 661	0.56
80+	138 335	168 651	306 986	0.53
Age group	Male	Female	Total	Percent
0–14	12 568 451	12 416 481	24 984 932	43.35
15–64	14 869 018	16 078 484	30 947 502	53.69
65+	792 130	913 064	1 705 194	2.96

== Vital statistics ==
Population, fertility rate and net reproduction rate, United Nations estimates

The Tanzanian Demographic and Health Survey 2010 estimated that the infant mortality rate for 2005–10 was 51. Registration of other vital events in Tanzania is not complete. The Population Department of the United Nations prepared the following estimates.

	Mid-year population	Live births	Deaths	Natural change	Crude birth rate (per 1000)	Crude death rate (per 1000)	Natural change (per 1000)	Total fertility rate (TFR)	Infant mortality (per 1000 births)
1950	7,632,000	365,000	168,000	197,000	47.7	22.0	25.8	6.49	145.0
1951	7,835,000	376,000	170,000	205,000	48.0	21.7	26.2	6.51	144.0
1952	8,045,000	387,000	174,000	213,000	48.1	21.7	26.5	6.53	143.1
1953	8,264,000	399,000	178,000	221,000	48.3	21.6	26.8	6.56	142.1
1954	8,490,000	411,000	182,000	229,000	48.5	21.4	27.0	6.58	141.2
1955	8,726,000	425,000	186,000	239,000	48.7	21.4	27.3	6.61	140.4
1956	8,970,000	439,000	191,000	248,000	48.9	21.3	27.6	6.65	139.7
1957	9,224,000	454,000	196,000	258,000	49.2	21.2	28.0	6.69	138.9
1958	9,488,000	467,000	201,000	266,000	49.2	21.1	28.1	6.70	138.1
1959	9,760,000	482,000	206,000	276,000	49.3	21.1	28.3	6.72	137.4
1960	10,042,000	496,000	211,000	285,000	49.4	21.0	28.4	6.73	136.6
1961	10,338,000	512,000	216,000	296,000	49.6	20.9	28.7	6.75	135.8
1962	10,645,000	528,000	221,000	307,000	49.6	20.8	28.8	6.76	134.9
1963	10,960,000	544,000	226,000	318,000	49.7	20.6	29.0	6.77	133.9
1964	11,290,000	560,000	231,000	329,000	49.6	20.4	29.2	6.78	132.7
1965	11,631,000	576,000	235,000	341,000	49.5	20.2	29.3	6.78	131.5
1966	11,982,000	593,000	239,000	354,000	49.5	20.0	29.5	6.79	130.1
1967	12,346,000	609,000	243,000	367,000	49.4	19.7	29.7	6.80	128.6
1968	12,740,000	628,000	245,000	383,000	49.4	19.2	30.1	6.84	127.1
1969	13,168,000	651,000	248,000	403,000	49.5	18.8	30.7	6.88	125.6
1970	13,618,000	675,000	252,000	423,000	49.7	18.5	31.1	6.91	124.0
1971	14,092,000	701,000	257,000	444,000	49.8	18.3	31.6	6.94	122.3
1972	14,596,000	725,000	262,000	463,000	49.8	18.0	31.8	6.95	120.5
1973	15,124,000	752,000	266,000	487,000	49.8	17.6	32.2	6.96	118.7
1974	15,671,000	781,000	272,000	510,000	49.9	17.4	32.6	7.00	116.7
1975	16,244,000	808,000	277,000	531,000	49.8	17.1	32.7	7.00	114.7
1976	16,839,000	832,000	281,000	551,000	49.5	16.7	32.8	6.99	112.6
1977	17,455,000	860,000	285,000	576,000	49.3	16.3	33.0	6.99	110.5
1978	18,080,000	887,000	289,000	598,000	49.1	16.0	33.1	6.98	108.7
1979	18,699,000	909,000	292,000	617,000	48.6	15.6	33.0	6.95	107.1
1980	19,298,000	930,000	297,000	632,000	48.1	15.4	32.7	6.91	106.2
1981	19,891,000	950,000	303,000	647,000	47.7	15.2	32.5	6.85	105.8
1982	20,500,000	973,000	311,000	663,000	47.4	15.1	32.3	6.80	105.8
1983	21,171,000	998,000	320,000	678,000	47.2	15.1	32.1	6.75	106.0
1984	21,857,000	1,017,000	329,000	688,000	46.5	15.1	31.4	6.67	106.1
1985	22,570,000	1,038,000	337,000	700,000	46.1	15.0	31.1	6.57	105.8
1986	23,324,000	1,059,000	345,000	714,000	45.4	14.8	30.6	6.48	105.0
1987	24,099,000	1,082,000	353,000	729,000	45.0	14.7	30.3	6.40	103.8
1988	24,844,000	1,110,000	360,000	749,000	44.6	14.5	30.1	6.37	102.5
1989	25,523,000	1,130,000	369,000	761,000	44.2	14.4	29.8	6.29	101.1
1990	26,206,000	1,149,000	380,000	769,000	43.8	14.5	29.3	6.20	99.9
1991	26,891,000	1,171,000	391,000	781,000	43.5	14.5	29.0	6.14	98.9
1992	27,581,000	1,190,000	404,000	787,000	43.1	14.6	28.5	6.08	98.2
1993	28,469,000	1,211,000	414,000	798,000	42.8	14.6	28.2	6.01	97.1
1994	29,598,000	1,250,000	426,000	824,000	42.5	14.5	28.0	5.93	96.2
1995	30,560,000	1,300,000	440,000	860,000	42.5	14.4	28.1	5.87	95.0
1996	31,141,000	1,334,000	450,000	884,000	42.5	14.3	28.2	5.85	93.4
1997	31,786,000	1,353,000	460,000	893,000	42.5	14.5	28.1	5.84	91.5
1998	32,626,000	1,386,000	464,000	922,000	42.4	14.2	28.2	5.79	88.7
1999	33,500,000	1,415,000	459,000	956,000	42.2	13.7	28.5	5.73	85.4
2000	34,464,000	1,453,000	457,000	996,000	42.1	13.3	28.9	5.69	81.6
2001	35,414,000	1,495,000	452,000	1,043,000	42.1	12.7	29.4	5.67	77.4
2002	36,354,000	1,525,000	447,000	1,078,000	41.9	12.3	29.6	5.62	73.1
2003	37,334,000	1,565,000	437,000	1,128,000	41.8	11.7	30.2	5.61	69.0
2004	38,361,000	1,613,000	433,000	1,179,000	42.0	11.3	30.7	5.61	65.4
2005	39,440,000	1,662,000	430,000	1,232,000	42.1	10.9	31.2	5.61	62.1
2006	40,562,000	1,696,000	428,000	1,269,000	41.7	10.5	31.2	5.56	59.2
2007	41,716,000	1,719,000	424,000	1,295,000	41.1	10.2	31.0	5.49	56.4
2008	42,871,000	1,748,000	422,000	1,325,000	40.7	9.8	30.8	5.43	54.0
2009	43,958,000	1,773,000	415,000	1,358,000	40.2	9.4	30.8	5.36	51.5
2010	45,111,000	1,795,000	401,000	1,394,000	39.7	8.9	30.8	5.29	49.5
2011	46,416,000	1,816,000	392,000	1,424,000	39.1	8.4	30.6	5.21	47.4
2012	47,786,000	1,833,000	382,000	1,451,000	38.3	8.0	30.3	5.10	45.5
2013	49,254,000	1,908,000	375,000	1,533,000	38.7	7.6	31.1	5.12	43.9
2014	50,815,000	1,978,000	369,000	1,609,000	38.9	7.3	31.6	5.12	42.2
2015	52,543,000	2,032,000	365,000	1,667,000	38.7	7.0	31.8	5.09	41.1
2016	54,402,000	2,086,000	361,000	1,725,000	38.4	6.7	31.7	5.03	39.8
2017	56,267,000	2,140,000	360,000	1,780,000	38.1	6.4	31.7	4.99	38.6
2018	58,090,000	2,181,000	359,000	1,822,000	37.5	6.2	31.3	4.92	37.3
2019	59,873,000	2,224,000	360,000	1,864,000	37.1	6.0	31.1	4.86	36.3
2020	61,705,000	2,262,000	381,000	1,881,000	36.7	6.2	30.5	4.80	35.3
2021	62,830,000	2,263,000	383,000	1,872,000	36.0	6.1	29.9	4.73	31.3
2022	64,712,000	2,306,000	378,000	1,890,000	35.6	5.8	29.8	4.67	30.1
2023	66,618,000	2,346,000	386,000	1,921,000	35.2	5.8	29.4	4.61	28.9
2024					34.8	5.7	29.1	4.54	
2025					34.3	5.7	28.6	4.47	

=== Life expectancy ===
Life expectancy in Tanzania since 1950

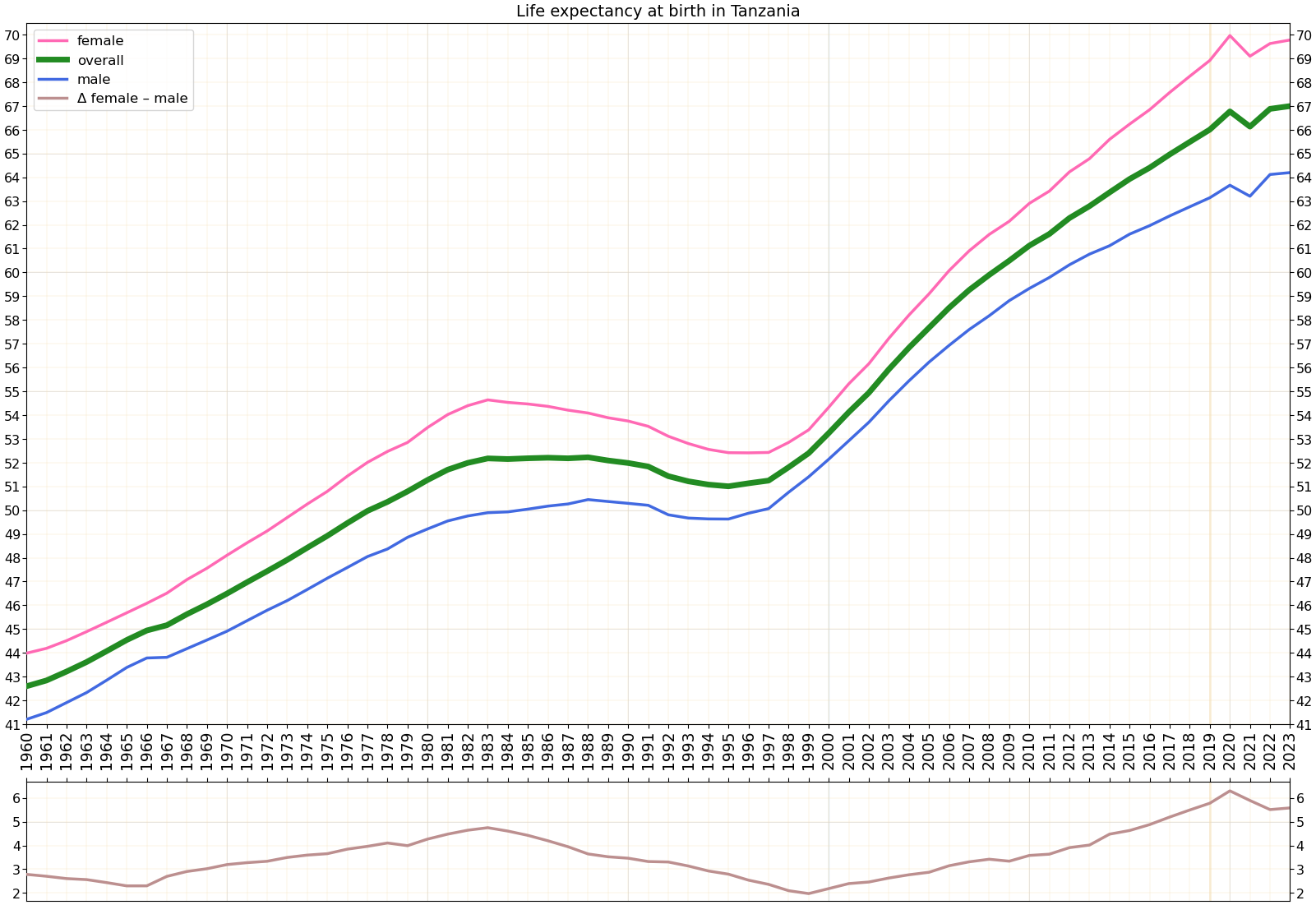
Life expectancy in Tanzania since 1960 by gender

Period	Life expectancy in Years
1950–1955	41.25
1955–1960	▲43.03
1960–1965	▲44.31
1965–1970	▲45.83
1970–1975	▲47.70
1975–1980	▲49.90
1980–1985	▲50.64
1985–1990	▲50.86
1990–1995	▼49.61
1995–2000	▼50.06
2000–2005	▲53.65
2005–2010	▲58.82
2010–2015	▲62.78
2020	▲66.40
2021	▼66.20

=== Census Data and Demographic and Health Surveys ===
Region	1967 (Population / Crude Birth Rate / Total Fertility Rate)	1978 (Population / Crude Birth Rate / Total Fertility Rate)	1988 (Population / Crude Birth Rate / Total Fertility Rate)	2002 (Population / Crude Birth Rate / Total Fertility Rate)	2012 (Population / Crude Birth Rate / Total Fertility Rate)
Tanzania, including Zanzibar	12,313,469 / 47 / 7.3	17,036,499 / 49 / 6.3	22,455,207 / 47 / 5.4	33,461,849 / 43 / 4.2	44,928,923 / /
Zanzibar	354,815 / 48 / 7.3	476,111 / 48 / 7.1	640,675 / 49 / 6.4	981,754 / 43 / 4.5	1,303,569 / /

Total Fertility Rate (TFR) (Wanted Fertility Rate) and Crude Birth Rate (CBR):

Year	CBR (Total)	TFR (Total)	CBR (Urban)	TFR (Urban)	CBR (Rural)	TFR (Rural)	CBR (Zanzibar)	TFR (Zanzibar)
1991-1992	42.8	6.25 (5.57)	42.1	5.14	43.0	6.59 (5.91)		
1996	40.8	5.82 (5.1)	36.3	4.11 (3.5)	41.9	6.34 (5.5)		
1999	41.4	5.55 (4.8)	34.4	3.16 (2.9)	43.5	6.48 (5.5)		
2004-2005	42.4	5.7 (4.9)	34.6	3.6 (3.1)	44.8	6.5 (5.6)	38.0	5.3 (4.6)
2010	38.1	5.4 (4.7)	35.0	3.7 (3.3)	39.0	6.1 (5.3)	35,9	5.1 (4.8)
2015-16	37.2	5.2 (4.5)	35.1	3.8 (3.4)	38.1	6.0 (5.1)	36.3	5.1 (4.6)
2017	35.5	4.9	31.0	3.5	37.3	5.7	33.7	4.5
2022	33.8	4.8 (4.4)	31.9	3.6 (3.4)	34.6	5.5 (5.0)	33.8	4.7 (4.3)

==== Regional fertility rates ====
Fertility rates are estimated by Surveys (TDHS) and Census in different times. TDHS surveys estimated these fertility rates: 6.3 (1991–92), 5.8 (1996), 5.7 (2004–05), 5.4 (2010) and 2002 Census said 6.3

Region	1967	1978	1988	2006-09	2017
Tanzania (country total)	7.3	6.3	5.4	5.4	4.9
Dodoma (capital)	7.6	6.2	5.9		6.0
Arusha	7.5	7.0	6.0		3.2
Kilimanjaro	8.9	7.5	5.8		3.4
Tanga	7.7	6.2	5.1		4.6
Morogoro	6.2	6.5	4.3		3.7
Pwani	5.8	6.1	5.4		3.8
Dar es Salaam	5.0	5.4	3.4		2.8
Lindi	-	5.4	4.6		3.9
Mtwara	5.7	4.9	4.5		3.3
Ruvuma	7.1	6.1	5.0		3.7
Iringa	7.8	6.3	4.9		4.5
Mbeya	8.1	6.3	4.7		4.7
Singida	6.3	5.9	5.7		7.4
Tabora	6.7	6.0	5.4		6.9
Rukwa	-	6.1	6.2		5.7
Kigoma	6.6	7.2	6.5		5.7
Shinyanga	8.7	6.9	6.3		5.5
Kagera	7.5	7.3	6.9		4.7
Mwanza	8.1	7.1	6.1		6.0
Mara	8.0	6.9	5.9		6.4
Manyara	-	-	-		6.0
Njombe	-	-	-		4.2
Simiyu	-	-	-		7.6
Geita	-	-	-		6.9
Katavi	-	-	-		6.7
Songwe	-	-	-		5.4
Tanzania Mainland	7.3	6.3	5.4	5.4	4.9
North Unguja	-	7.1	7.0		4.5
South Unguja	-	6.2	6.5		3.2
Urban West	-	6.1	5.2		3.6
North Pemba	-	8.3	6.9		6.3
South Pemba	-	8.2	7.6		5.5
Tanzania Zanzibar	7.3	7.1	6.4	5.1	4.5

== Ethnic groups ==
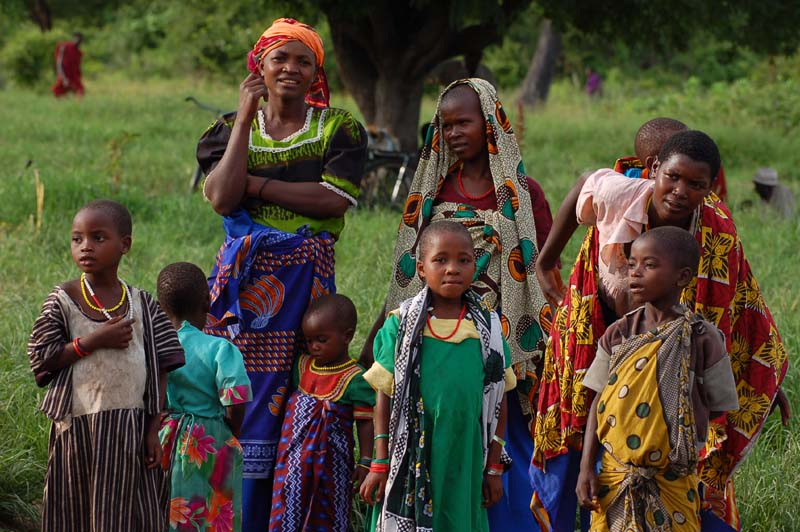
The Bantu Sukuma are Tanzania's largest ethnic group.

mainland - African 99% (of which 95% are Bantu consisting of more than 130 tribes), other 1% (consisting of Asian, European, and Arab); Zanzibar - Arab, African, mixed Arab and African. Around 100,000 people living in Tanzania are from Europe or Asia.

== Languages ==
- Kiswahili or Swahili or Kiunguja (in Zanzibar) (official)
- English (official)
- Arabic (widely spoken in Zanzibar)

== Religion ==
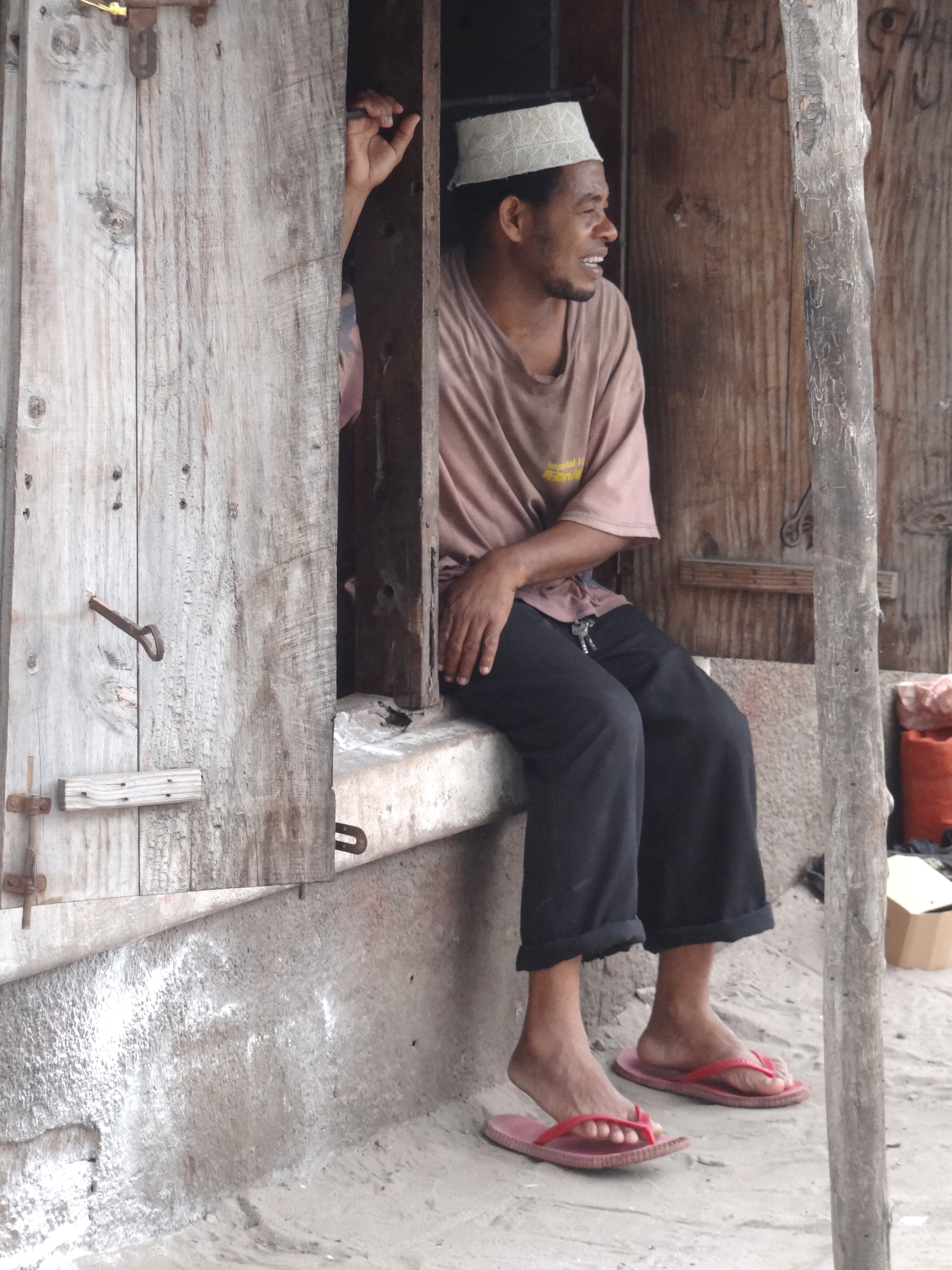
A Muslim man in Bagamoyo.

Most Tanzanians are nowadays Christians and Muslims. The numerical relationship between followers of the two religions is regarded as politically sensitive and questions about religious affiliation have not been included in census questionnaires since 1967.

For many years estimates have been repeated that about a third of the population each follows Islam, Christianity and traditional religions. As there is likely no longer such a large percentage of traditional religionists, a range of competing estimates has been published giving one side or the other a large share or trying to show equal shares.

Estimates from the Pew Report Islam and Christianity (2010) were 60% Christian and 36% Muslim.

The remainder of the population are Hindus, Buddhists, animists, and unaffiliated. Most Christians are Roman Catholic, Lutheran, Anglican or Pentecostal, though a number of other churches, as Seventh-Day Adventist, and Eastern Orthodox Christians are also represented in the country. Most Tanzanian Muslims are Sunni Muslims, though there are also populations of Ibadi, Shia, Ahamadiya, Bohora. Muslims are concentrated in coastal areas and in mainland areas along former caravan trade routes.

== See also ==
- List of ethnic groups in Tanzania
