= National Assembly (Tanzania) =

Unicameral legislature of Tanzania

Coordinates: 6.1805°S 35.7565°E

National Assembly Bunge la Tanzania (Swahili)
- 13th Parliament

Type
- Type: Unicameral

History
- Founded: 1 January 1962
- New session started: November 2025

Leadership
- Speaker: Mussa Zungu, CCM since 11 November 2025
- Deputy Speaker: Daniel Sillo, CCM since 11 November 2025
- Prime Minister: Mwigulu Nchemba, CCM since 13 November 2025

Structure
- Seats: 403
- Political groups: Government (398): CCM (398); Opposition (4): ACT (2); CHAUMMA (2); Other (1): Attorney General (1)
- Length of term: 5 years

Elections
- Voting system: Mixed-member majoritarian representation: 272 elected from single-member districts by First-past-the-post voting; 115 elected from women-only lists by party-list proportional representation; 5 elected indirectly by the Zanzibar House of Representatives; Attorney General; 10 appointed by the President of Tanzania
- First election: 1 November 1962
- Last election: 29 October 2025
- Next election: 29 October 2030

Meeting place
- Parliament House; Dodoma, Tanzania

Website
- Parliament website

Constitution
- Constitution of Tanzania

The National Assembly of Tanzania (Swahili: Bunge la Tanzania) and the President of the United Republic of Tanzania make up the Parliament of Tanzania. The current Speaker of the National Assembly is Mussa Zungu, who presides over a unicameral assembly of 403 members.

== History ==
The National Assembly of Tanzania was formed as the Legislative Council of Tanzania Mainland – then known as Tanganyika – in 1926. The Council was formed under a law enacted by the British Parliament called the Tanganyika Legislative Council Order and Council. The law was gazetted in Tanganyika on 18 June 1926. The Council consisted of 20 members when it was formed on 7 December 1926 under the Chairmanship of the Governor of Tanganyika, Sir Donald Cameron.

The first Speaker was appointed to replace the Governor as the Chairman of the Council in 1953. The office of Speaker was first occupied on 1 November 1953.

In 1958, the Council got a few elected representatives for the first time. This was the first election allowed in the colony. Of the three political parties which participated in the elections, namely Tanganyika African Union (TANU), United Tanganyika Party (UTP) and African National Congress (ANC), only TANU won in some constituencies, thus becoming the first party to have elected members on the Council.

Second elections for positions on the Council were held in 1960. These elections were part of the preparations being made to make Tanganyika an independent nation. All members appointed by the Governor were abolished and the people of Tanganyika were allowed to elect all members of the Council.

In the same year, the name of the Council was changed to Legislative Assembly. The changes made in this year were constitutionally necessary so as to allow the President of Tanganyika to give assent to all laws passed instead of the Queen of the United Kingdom.

== Mandate ==
The Parliament – the National Assembly and the President of the United Republic – obtains its mandate and functions from Chapter 3 of the Constitution of the United Republic of Tanzania. The Constitution contains Articles that grant for the establishment, composition and functions of the Parliament.

== Functions ==
The Parliament has powers to deal with both Union and non-Union issues which are not in the scope of the Zanzibar Government. It is responsible for discussing bills and passing laws. It also scrutinizes the actions of the Executive arm of the Government.

== Composition ==
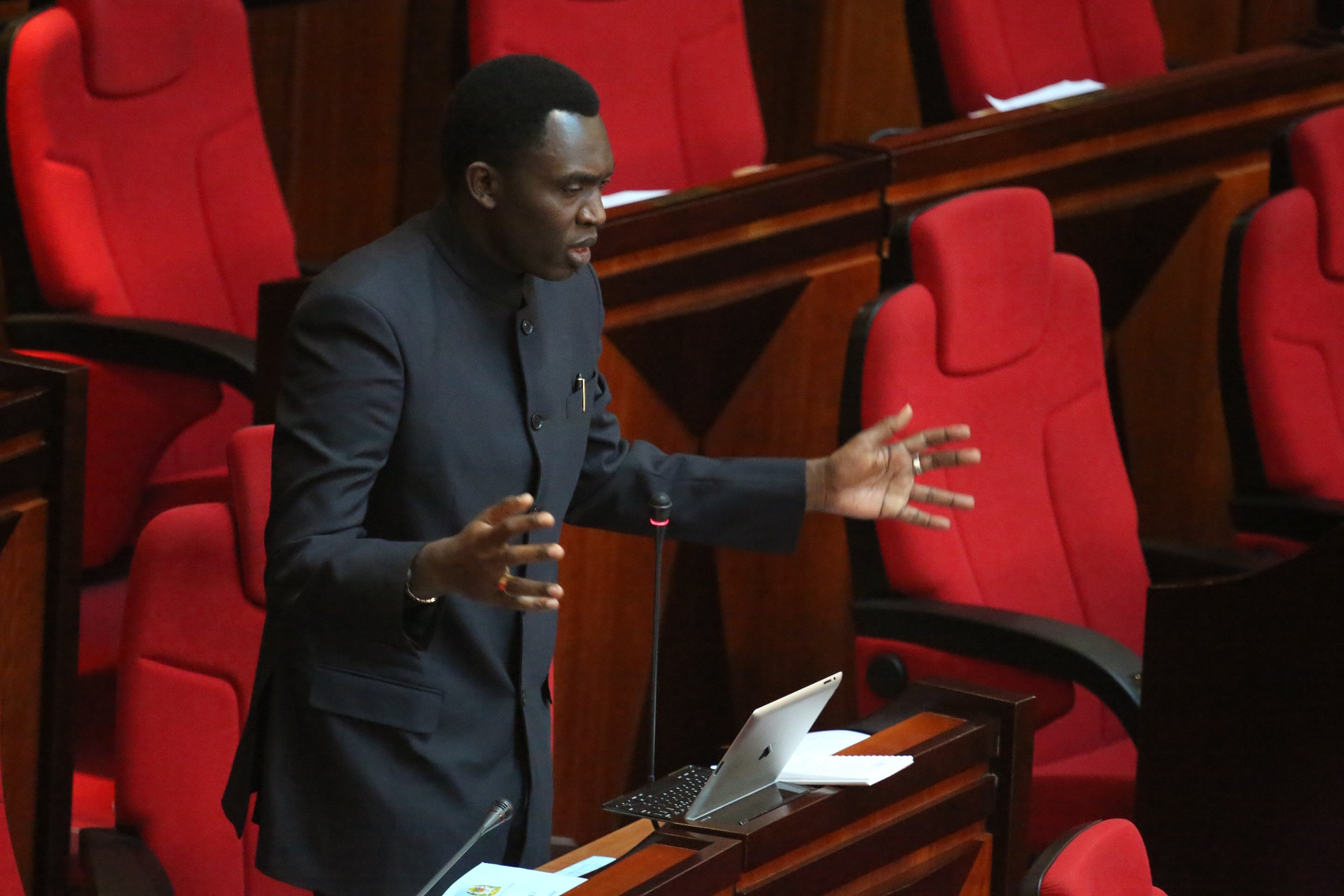
Hamisi Kigwangalla addressing the parliament

Article 66 of the Constitution of Tanzania outlines the following categories of members:

Type	No. of members
Elected from constituencies	272
Special seats reserved for women	115
Zanzibar House of Representatives	5
Attorney General (Ex officio member)	1
Nominated by the President	10
Total	403

== See also ==
- List of speakers of the National Assembly of Tanzania
- List of current members of the National Assembly of Tanzania
- Politics of Tanzania
- Zanzibar House of Representatives
