= Iringa (disambiguation) =

Iringa is a town in Tanzania.

Iringa may refer to:

- Iringa Region, a region of Tanzania
  - Iringa Urban District, a district of the Iringa Region
  - Iringa Rural District, a district of the Iringa Region
- Iringa Airport, a domestic airport
- MV Iringa, a ferry operated in Lake Nyasa
