= Nzihi =

Ward in Iringa, Tanzania

Nzihi Kata ya Nzihi
- Ward
- Location within Tanzania Location within Africa
- Coordinates: 7°43′S 35°32′E
- Country: Tanzania
- Region: Iringa Region
- District: Iringa Rural
- Ward: Nzihi

Population (2016)
  - Total: 15,562
- Time zone: UTC+3 (EAT)
- Postcode: 51206

Nzihi is an administrative ward in the Iringa Rural district of the Iringa Region of Tanzania. In 2016 the Tanzania National Bureau of Statistics report there were 15,562 people in the ward, from 14,872 in 2012.

== Villages / vitongoji ==
The ward has 5 villages and 45 vitongoji.

- Nyamihuu
  - Chemchem
  - Igingimali
  - Isala
  - Isupilo
  - Kilimahewa
  - Mabatini
  - Majengo
  - Makanyagio
  - Mbuyuni
  - Mkombe
  - Mlangali
  - Wilolesi
- Kipera
  - Kipera ofisini
  - Kisombambone
  - Mbulula
  - Mbuyuni
  - Mifugo
  - Mkola
  - Mkwata
  - Mkwawa
  - Mlambalasi
- Magubike
  - Chelesi
  - Ibogo
  - Igangilonga
  - Kinyang'ama
  - Kinyasaula
  - mtakuja
- Nzihi
  - Ihanzu
  - Mazombe
  - Mbega
  - Mhanga
  - Mimwema A
  - Mjimwema B
  - Nzihi A
  - Nzihi B
- Ilalasimba
  - George. Filiakosi
  - Igunga Ndembwe
  - Ilalasimba
  - Ipangani
  - James. Nzani
  - Kalangali
  - Kayugwa
  - Kidamali
  - Songambele
  - Winome
