= Mahuninga =

Ward in Iringa, Tanzania

Mahuninga Kata ya Mahuninga
- Ward
- Location within Tanzania
- Coordinates: 7.929°S 34.978°E
- Country: Tanzania
- Region: Iringa Region
- District: Iringa Rural
- Ward: Mahuninga

Population (2016)
  - Total: 4,532
- Time zone: UTC+3 (EAT)
- Postcode: 51215

Mahuninga is an administrative ward in the Iringa Rural district of the Iringa Region of Tanzania. In 2016 the Tanzania National Bureau of Statistics report there were 4,532 people in the ward, from 4,331 in 2012.

== Villages / vitongoji ==
The ward has 3 villages and 13 vitongoji.

- Mahuninga
  - Kitalingolo
  - Majengo A
  - Majengo B
  - Ufyambe
- Kisilwa
  - Isukutwa
  - Kisilwa
  - Misufi
- Makifu
  - Isanga
  - Mahove
  - Makambalala-A
  - Makambalala-B
  - Makifu
  - Mkanisoka
