= Kihesa =

Ward in Iringa, Tanzania

Kihesa Kata ya Kihesa
- Ward
- Location within Tanzania
- Coordinates: 7.746°S 35.72°E
- Country: Tanzania
- Region: Iringa Region
- District: Iringa Urban
- Ward: Kihesa

Population (2016)
  - Total: 19,040
- Time zone: UTC+3 (EAT)
- Postcode: 51109

Kihesa is an administrative ward in the Iringa Urban district of the Iringa Region of Tanzania. In 2016 the Tanzania National Bureau of Statistics report there were 19,040 people in the ward, from 18,196 in 2012.

== Neighborhoods ==
The ward has 15 neighborhoods.

- Dodoma Road A
- Dodoma Road B
- Dodoma Road F
- Ilembula
- Kilimani
- Mafifi
- Mbuma
- Mfaranyaki
- Msikitini
- Mwenge
- Ngome
- Ramadhani Waziri
- Semtema A
- Semtema B
- Sokoni
