= Kitanzini =

Ward in Iringa, Tanzania

Kitanzini Kata ya Kitanzini
- Ward
- Location within Tanzania
- Coordinates: 7.784°S 35.695°E
- Country: Tanzania
- Region: Iringa Region
- District: Iringa Urban
- Ward: Kitanzini

Population (2016)
  - Total: 3,785
- Time zone: UTC+3 (EAT)
- Postcode: 51103

Kitanzini is an administrative ward in the Iringa Urban district of the Iringa Region of Tanzania. In 2016, the Tanzania National Bureau of Statistics reported that there are 3,785 people in the ward, from 3,617 in 2012.

== Neighborhoods ==
The ward has 9 neighborhoods.

- Jamat
- Kitanzini
- Legezamwendo
- Madrasa
- Maweni
- Miyomboni
- Mlimani
- Polisi Line
- Stendi Kuu
