= Kiwere =

Ward in Iringa, Tanzania

Kiwere Kata ya Kiwere
- Ward
- Location within Tanzania
- Coordinates: 7.644°S 35.602°E
- Country: Tanzania
- Region: Iringa Region
- District: Iringa Rural
- Ward: Kiwere

Population (2016)
  - Total: 10,229
- Time zone: UTC+3 (EAT)
- Postcode: 51207

Kiwere is an administrative ward in the Iringa Rural district of the Iringa Region of Tanzania. In 2016 the Tanzania National Bureau of Statistics report there were 10,229 people in the ward, from 9,776 in 2012.

== Villages / vitongoji ==
The ward has 5 villages and 21 vitongoji.

- Kiwere
  - Chapakazi
  - Makondo
  - Mwaya A
  - Mwaya B
- Mgera
  - Kidete
  - Luganga
  - Mapinduzi
  - Mlangali
- Itagutwa
  - Itagutwa
  - Kipengele
  - Mapululu
  - Mlenge
- Kitapilimwa
  - Ikingo
  - Kinyamaduma
  - Lugalo
- Mfyome
  - Malamba A
  - Malamba B
  - Matembo
  - Mgega
  - Mhefu
  - Msosa
