= Mtwivila =

Ward in Iringa, Tanzania

Mtwivila Kata ya Mtwivila
- Ward
- Location within Tanzania
- Coordinates: 7.735°S 35.708°E
- Country: Tanzania
- Region: Iringa Region
- District: Iringa Urban
- Ward: Mtwivila

Population (2016)
  - Total: 11,174
- Time zone: UTC+3 (EAT)
- Postcode: 51110

Mtwivila is an administrative ward in the Iringa Urban district of the Iringa Region of Tanzania. In 2016 the Tanzania National Bureau of Statistics report there were 11,174 people in the ward, from 21,017 in 2012.

== Neighborhoods ==
The ward has 10 neighborhoods.

- Dodoma Road "C"
- Dodoma Road "D"
- Dodoma Road "E"
- Idunda
- Mtwivila "C"
- Mtwivila 'A'
- Mtwivila 'B'
- Mwautwa
- Semkini
- Viziwi
