= Ilala =

Ilala may refer to:

- Ilala, a village in Simret municipality, Ethiopia
- Ilala District in Dar es Salaam, Tanzania
- Ilala River near Mekelle, Ethiopia
- Ilala (Iringa Urban ward), an administrative ward in the Iringa Urban district of Tanzania
- Ilala ward, administrative ward in the Ilala district of Tanzania
- Ilala, Kwara, a town in Kwara state
- Ilala (Zambia), a geographical region of Zambia
- MV Ilala, a steamer plying the waters of Lake Malawi
