= Makorongoni =

Ward in Iringa, Tanzania

Makorongoni Kata ya Makorongoni
- Ward
- Location within Tanzania
- Coordinates: 7.775°S 35.69°E
- Country: Tanzania
- Region: Iringa Region
- District: Iringa Urban
- Ward: Makorongoni

Population (2016)
  - Total: 8,151
- Time zone: UTC+3 (EAT)
- Postcode: 51104

Makorongoni is an administrative ward in the Iringa Urban district of the Iringa Region of Tanzania. In 2016 the Tanzania National Bureau of Statistics report there were 8,151 people in the ward, from 7,790 in 2012.

== Neighborhoods ==
The ward has 13 neighborhoods.

- Baniani
- Kaguo
- Kibwana
- Mahagi
- Mahiwa
- Mkwawa Road
- Msichoke
- Muhimba "A"
- Muhimba "B"
- Pangani
- Pawaga Road
- Sekondari
- Tandamti
