= Chondrolepis obscurior =

Scientific classification
- Kingdom: Animalia
- Phylum: Arthropoda
- Class: Insecta
- Order: Lepidoptera
- Family: Hesperiidae
- Genus: Chondrolepis
- Species: C. obscurior

Binomial name
- Chondrolepis obscurior de Jong, 1986

Species of butterfly

Chondrolepis obscurior is a species of butterfly in the family Hesperiidae. It is found in Tanzania from the Southern Highlands to Mufindi.
