= Mlowa =

Ward in Iringa, Tanzania

Mlowa Kata ya Mlowa
- Ward
- Location within Tanzania
- Coordinates: 7.68°S 35.374°E
- Country: Tanzania
- Region: Iringa Region
- District: Iringa Rural
- Ward: Mlowa

Population (2016)
  - Total: 9,923
- Time zone: UTC+3 (EAT)
- Postcode: 51208

Mlowa is an administrative ward in the Iringa Rural district of the Iringa Region of Tanzania. In 2016 the Tanzania National Bureau of Statistics report there were 9,923 people in the ward, from 9,483 in 2012.

== Villages / vitongoji ==
The ward has 3 villages and 19 vitongoji.

- Malizanga
  - Ikonongo
  - Majengo A
  - Majengo B
  - Malizanga
  - Matalawe
  - Mlowa
  - Mtakuja
  - Ndorobo A
  - Ndorobo B
- Nyamahana
  - Ipwasi
  - Majengo
  - Mbuyuni
  - Mlambalasi
  - Mtakuja
- Mafuluto
  - Kibuduga
  - Magoya
  - Majengo
  - Mseketule
  - Muungano
