= Gangilonga =

Ward in Iringa, Tanzania

Gangilonga Kata ya Gangilonga
- Ward
- Location within Tanzania Location within Africa
- Coordinates: 7.766°S 35.695°E
- Country: Tanzania
- Region: Iringa Region
- District: Iringa Urban District
- Established: 1984

Government
  - Type: Council

Area
  - Total: 5.557 km^{2} (2.146 sq mi)
- Elevation: 1,703 m (5,587 ft)

Population (2012)
  - Total: 9,599
  - Density: 1,727/km^{2} (4,474/sq mi)
- Time zone: EAT
- Postcode: 51108
- Area code: 027

Gangilonga is an administrative ward in the located in Iringa Urban District of the Iringa Region of Tanzania. The ward covers and area of 5.557 square kilometres (2.146 sq mi) with an altitude of 1,703 metres (5,587 ft).

In 2016 the Tanzania National Bureau of Statistics report there were 10,044 people in the ward, from 9,599 in 2012.

It borders Kihesa Ward and Mtwivila ward at the South, Ruaha ward at the South West, Makorongoni ward at the West and Miyomboni Kitanzini at the North West. Gangilonga ward has four Public Primary schools instructed in Kiswahili namely Wilolesi Primary School, Lugalo Primary School, Sabasaba Primary School, Gangilonga Primary School and one Public Primary School named Mapinduzi Primary School which is instructed in English. Regardless of having 10 streets, Gangilonga has only one dispensary located at Sabasaba street and no police post. Gangilonga ward is a home of famous large stone known as Gangilonga stone “Jiwe Gangilonga” which is now a Tourism Facility managed by the Tanzania Ministry of Natural Resources and Tourism.

== Villages / vitongoji ==
The ward has 9 neighborhoods.

- FFU
- Gangilonga
- Kichangani
- Kilimani
- Kinondoni
- Lugalo A
- Lugalo B
- Sabasaba
- Wilolesi
