= Mseke =

Ward in Iringa, Tanzania

Mseke Kata ya Mseke
- Ward
- Location within Tanzania
- Coordinates: 7.92°S 35.581°E
- Country: Tanzania
- Region: Iringa Region
- District: Iringa Rural
- Ward: Mseke

Population (2016)
  - Total: 12,985
- Time zone: UTC+3 (EAT)
- Postcode: 51204

Mseke is an administrative ward in the Iringa Rural district of the Iringa Region of Tanzania. In 2016 the Tanzania National Bureau of Statistics report there were 12,985 people in the ward, from 15,868 in 2012.

== Villages / vitongoji ==
The ward has 4 villages and 24 vitongoji.

- Tanangozi
  - Kanisani
  - Kihongolelo
  - Kilindi
  - Kimwanyula
  - Lunguya
  - Stesheni 'A'
  - Stesheni 'B'
- Mlandege
  - Gezaulole
  - Maumbamatali
  - Mlandege 'A'
  - Mlandege 'B'
- Ugwachanya
  - Banavanu
  - Igavilo
  - Ismila
  - Lukolela
  - Mseke 'A'
  - Mseke 'B'
  - Njiapanda 'A'
  - Njiapanda 'B'
  - Ulongambi
  - Winome
- Wenda
  - Wenda 'A;
  - Wenda 'B'
  - Wenda 'C'
  - Wenda 'D'
