= Mlandege =

Ward in Iringa, Tanzania

Mlandege Kata ya Mlandege
- Ward
- Location within Tanzania
- Coordinates: 7.784°S 35.68°E
- Country: Tanzania
- Region: Iringa Region
- District: Iringa Urban
- Ward: Mlandege

Population (2016)
  - Total: 4,855
- Time zone: UTC+3 (EAT)
- Postcode: 51107

Mlandege is an administrative ward in the Iringa Urban district of the Iringa Region of Tanzania. In 2016 the Tanzania National Bureau of Statistics report there were 4,855 people in the ward, from 4,640 in 2012.

== Neighborhoods ==
The ward has 12 neighborhoods.

- Kalenga Road
- Kota
- Lubida
- Mafuruto
- Makondeko
- Mapinduzi
- Mlambalazi
- Msanya
- Ngeng'ena
- Ngulika
- Nguzo
- Sokoni
