= Kitwiru =

Ward in Iringa, Tanzania

Kitwiru Kata ya Kitwiru
- Ward
- Location within Tanzania
- Coordinates: 7.82°S 35.664°E
- Country: Tanzania
- Region: Iringa Region
- District: Iringa Urban
- Ward: Kitwiru

Population (2016)
  - Total: 11,992
- Time zone: UTC+3 (EAT)
- Postcode: 51113

Kitwiru is an administrative ward in the Iringa Urban district of the Iringa Region of Tanzania. In 2016 the Tanzania National Bureau of Statistics report there were 11,992 people in the ward, from 11,461 in 2012.

== Neighborhoods ==
The ward has 14 neighborhoods.

- Cagliero
- Kibwabwa 'A'
- Kibwabwa 'B'
- Kisiwani
- Kitwiru 'A'
- Kitwiru 'B'
- Mosi
- Nyamhanga 'A'
- Nyamhanga 'B'
- Nyamhanga 'C'
- Nyamhanga 'D'
- Nyamhanga 'E'
- Uyole 'A'
- Uyole 'B'
