= Mwangata =

Ward in Iringa, Tanzania

Mwangata Kata ya Mwangata
- Ward
- Location within Tanzania
- Coordinates: 7.764°S 35.664°E
- Country: Tanzania
- Region: Iringa Region
- District: Iringa Urban
- Ward: Mwangata

Population (2016)
  - Total: 14,111
- Time zone: UTC+3 (EAT)
- Postcode: 51112

Mwangata is an administrative ward in the Iringa Urban district of the Iringa Region of Tanzania. In 2016 the Tanzania National Bureau of Statistics report there were 14,111 people in the ward, from 13,486 in 2012.

== Neighborhoods ==
The ward has 11 neighborhoods.

- Isoka 'A'
- Isoka 'B'
- Kigamboni
- Kisiwani
- Mawelewele
- Muungano
- Mwangata 'A'
- Mwangata 'B'
- Mwangata 'C'
- Mwangata 'D'
- Ngelewala
