= Kwakilosa =

Ward in Iringa, Tanzania

Kwakilosa Kata ya Kwakilosa
- Ward
- Location within Tanzania
- Coordinates: 7.766°S 35.656°E
- Country: Tanzania
- Region: Iringa Region
- District: Iringa Urban
- Ward: Kwakilosa

Population (2016)
  - Total: 8,317
- Time zone: UTC+3 (EAT)
- Postcode: 51106

Kwakilosa is an administrative ward in the Iringa Urban district of the Iringa Region of Tanzania. In 2016 the Tanzania National Bureau of Statistics report there were 8,317 people in the ward, from 7,948 in 2012.

== Neighborhoods ==
The ward has 10 neighborhoods.

- Beira
- Frelimo 'C'
- Jangwani
- Kidunda
- Kijiweni
- Kisiwani
- Muungano 'A'
- Muungano 'B'
- Samora
- Shule
