= Ilolo Mpya =

Ward in Iringa, Tanzania

Ilolo Mpya Kata ya Ilolo Mpya
- Ward
- Location within Tanzania
- Coordinates: 7.453364°S 35.479455°E
- Country: Tanzania
- Region: Iringa Region
- District: Iringa Rural
- Ward: Ilolo Mpya

Population (2016)
  - Total: 6,672
- Time zone: UTC+3 (EAT)
- Postcode: 51209

Ilolo Mpya is an administrative ward in the Iringa Rural district of the Iringa Region of Tanzania. In 2016 the Tanzania National Bureau of Statistics report there were 6,672 people in the ward, from 6,376 in 2012.

== Villages / vitongoji ==
The ward has 4 villages and 17 vitongoji.

- Ilolompya
  - Ilolo
  - Magangamatitu
  - Mllimani
- Luganga
  - Barabarambili
  - Kihesa
  - Mawande
  - Motomoto
  - Mtakuja
  - Sadani
  - Ukwega
  - Uwanjani
- Magozi
  - Isegelele
  - Kimalanongwa
  - Magozi
- Mkombilenga
  - Chamamba
  - Mtakuja
  - Muungano
