= Mshindo =

Ward in Iringa, Tanzania

Mshindo Kata ya Mshindo
- Ward
- Location within Tanzania Location within Africa
- Coordinates: 10°32′S 35°46′E
- Country: Tanzania
- Region: Iringa Region
- District: Iringa Urban
- Ward: Mshindo

Population (2016)
  - Total: 1,980
- Time zone: UTC+3 (EAT)
- Postcode: 51102

Mshindo is an administrative ward in the Iringa Urban district of the Iringa Region of Tanzania. In 2016 the Tanzania National Bureau of Statistics report there were 1,980 people in the ward, from 1,892 in 2012.

== Neighborhoods ==
The ward has 7 neighborhoods.

- Benki
- Mshindo 'A'
- Mshindo 'B'
- Msikiti
- Mtwa 'A'
- Mtwa 'B'
- Ruaha
