= Malenga Makali =

Ward in Iringa, Tanzania

Malenga Makali Kata ya Malenga Makali
- Ward
- Location within Tanzania
- Coordinates: 7.291°S 36.029°E
- Country: Tanzania
- Region: Iringa Region
- District: Iringa Rural
- Ward: Malenga Makali

Population (2016)
  - Total: 8,284
- Time zone: UTC+3 (EAT)
- Postcode: 51218

Malengamakali is an administrative ward in the Iringa Rural district of the Iringa Region of Tanzania. In 2016 the Tanzania National Bureau of Statistics report there were 8,284 people in the ward, from 7,917 in 2012.

== Villages / vitongoji ==
The ward has 6 villages and 27 vitongoji.

- Nyakavangala
  - Ngega
  - Nyakavangala A
  - Nyakavangala B
  - Nyakavangala C
- Isaka
  - Idari
  - Isaka A
  - Isaka B
  - Makegeke
- Makadupa
  - Amani
  - Makadupa kati
  - Sokoine
- Iguluba
  - Bomalang’ombe
  - Iguluba Kati
  - Msumbiji
- Mkulula
  - Kikuyu
  - Luganga A
  - Luhomelo
  - Lunganga B
  - Mapalagaga
  - Mbuyuni
  - Stendi A
  - Stendi B
- Usolanga
  - Ihumbiliza A
  - Ihumbiliza B
  - Ihumbiliza C
  - Kawemba
  - Usolanga kati
