= Ulanda =

Ward in Iringa, Tanzania

Ulanda Kata ya Ulanda
- Ward
- Location within Tanzania
- Coordinates: 7.808°S 35.569°E
- Country: Tanzania
- Region: Iringa Region
- District: Iringa Rural District
- Ward: Ulanda

Population (2016)
  - Total: 9,686
- Time zone: UTC+3 (EAT)
- Postcode: 51205

Ulanda is an Ward in the Iringa Rural District of the Iringa Region of Tanzania, East Africa. In 2016 the Tanzania National Bureau of Statistics report there were 9,686 people in the ward, from 9,257 in 2012.

The 200 bed Tosamaganga Hospital is located in Ulanda ward. It is operated by a faith based organisation.

== Villages / vitongoji ==
The ward has 6 villages and 34 vitongoji.

- Mangalali
  - Itunda A
  - Itunda B
  - Kikongoma
  - Kitoo A
  - Kitoo B
  - Lukwambe A
  - Lukwambe B
  - Mangalali A
  - Mangalali B
- Kibebe
  - Ikanumgunda
  - Ikanuulime
  - Itamba
  - Kilolo
  - Lugung’unzi
  - Lupange
  - Nyambila
- Lupalama
  - Lupalama-Kilimani
  - Mjimwema
  - Mlaga
  - Mwangata
- Ibangamoyo
  - Henge
  - Ibangamoyo
  - Katenge
  - Mlandizi
  - Mwika
- Mwambao
  - Idete
  - Kilimahewa
  - Mwambao A
  - Mwambao B
- Weru
  - Imwagamapesa
  - Ipangani
  - Kilangali
  - Magangwe
  - Mseke
