= Ilula =

Ward in Kilolo, Iringa, Tanzania

- Town and ward
- Location in Tanzania
- Coordinates: 7.678321°S 36.038603°E
- Country: Tanzania
- Region: Iringa Region
- District: Kilolo District

Population (2002)
  - Total: 28,117
- Time zone: UTC+3 (EAT)
- Postcode: 51302
- Climate: Cwb

Ilula is a town and ward in Kilolo District in the Iringa Region of Tanzania. The Ilula Hospital is located in the town. It is operated by a faith-based organization.

In 2016 the Tanzania National Bureau of Statistics report there were 11,624 people in the ward, from 11,109 in 2012.
