= Magulilwa =

Ward in Iringa, Tanzania

Maguliwa Kata ya Maguliwa
- Ward
- Location within Tanzania
- Coordinates: 7.958°S 35.741°E
- Country: Tanzania
- Region: Iringa Region
- District: Iringa Rural
- Ward: Maguliwa

Population (2022)
  - Total: 15,205
- Time zone: UTC+3 (EAT)
- Postcode: 51202

Maguliwa, also known as Magulilwa, is an administrative ward in the Iringa Rural district of the Iringa Region of Tanzania. In 2016 the Tanzania National Bureau of Statistics report there were 14,271 people in the ward, from 13,639 in 2012. The area of Magulilwa is estimated to be around 148.8 km². The gender population of Magulilwa is pretty balanced, with males consisting of 49.1% of the population, and females consisting of 50.9% of the population.

== Villages / vitongoji ==
The ward has 6 villages and 36 vitongoji.

- Magulilwa
  - Godown A
  - Godown B
  - Godown C
  - Ilala
  - Kihesakilolo
  - Majengo
  - Mbavi
  - Mifugo
  - Sekuse
- Ng’enza
  - Kinyaminyi
  - Lutengelo
  - Masela
  - Mlevela
  - Muungano
- Msuluti
  - Igunga
  - Kihesakilolo
  - Milanzi
  - Mlowa
  - Msukwa
  - Mwaya
- Mlanda
  - Ilembula
  - Mlanda A
  - Mlanda B
  - Msombe
  - Nyalawe
  - Ukang’a
- Negabihi
  - Igeleke
  - Isoliwaya
  - Kilimahewa
  - Letengano
  - Muungano
- Ndiwili
  - Kitanzini
  - Madukani
  - Matema
  - Migoli A
  - Migoli B
  - Mivinjeni
  - Msuluti A
  - Msuluti B
  - Mtakuja
