= Lumuli =

Ward in Iringa, Tanzania

Lumuli Kata ya Lumuli
- Ward
- Location within Tanzania
- Coordinates: 8.071°S 35.378°E
- Country: Tanzania
- Region: Iringa Region
- District: Iringa Rural
- Ward: Lumuli

Population (2016)
  - Total: 8,216
- Time zone: UTC+3 (EAT)
- Postcode: 51211

Lumuli is an administrative ward in the Iringa Rural district of the Iringa Region of Tanzania. In 2016 the Tanzania National Bureau of Statistics report there were 8,216 people in the ward, from 7,852 in 2012.

== Villages / vitongoji ==
The ward has 4 villages and 22 vitongoji.

- Lumuli
  - Kalengachwa
  - Kibalali
  - Kihata
  - Kihesa
  - Kilimahewa
  - Kitemela
  - Lugema
  - Uhopela
  - Vikula
- Itengulinyi
  - Ipangani
  - Itengulinyi
  - Lukingita
  - Makanyagio A
  - Makanyagio B
- Isupilo
  - Isupilo
  - Makanyagio
  - Masumbo
  - Usambusi
- Muwimbi
  - Gezaulole
  - Kibugumo
  - Muwimbi
  - Ulete
