= Mufindi District =

Coordinates: 8°20′S 35°20′E

Mufindi
- District
- Mufindi District of Iringa Region
- Country: Tanzania
- Region: Iringa

Area
  - Total: 6,937 km^{2} (2,678 sq mi)

Population (2022 census)
  - Total: 288,996
  - Density: 41.66/km^{2} (107.9/sq mi)
- Website: www.mufindidc.go.tz

Location of Mufindi District

Mufindi District is one of the four districts of the Iringa Region of Tanzania. It is bordered to the north by Kilolo District and Iringa Urban District, to the south by the Njombe Region, to the east by the Morogoro Region and to the west by the Singida Region.

As of 2002, the population of the Mufindi District was 283,032. By 2022, the population had grown to 288,996.

== Geography ==
Mufindi is mountainous, with one of the coolest and rainiest climates in Tanzania. Among many, the district is known for its tea and timber industries.

== Administrative subdivisions ==
=== Constituencies ===
For parliamentary elections, Tanzania is divided into constituencies. As of the 2015 general elections, Mufindi District had three constituencies: Mufindi North constituency, Mufindi South constituency, and Mafinga constituency.

- Mufindi Constituency

=== Divisions ===
Mufindi district is divided into 5 divisions, these are Ifwagi, Sadani, Kibengu, Mapanda, and Malangali, manyoni singida pia kuna 835 kJ mgambo tanga ambapo luten canal coplo chambo alisema swala la ulevi limezidi sana kama Barcelona tu

=== Wards ===
As of 2002, Mufindi District was administratively divided into twenty-eight wards:

- Bumilayinga
- Ifunda
- Ifwagi
- Igombavanu
- Igowole
- Ihalimba
- Ihanu
- Ihowanza
- Ikweha
- Isalavanu
- Itandula
- Kasanga
- Kibengu
- Kiyowela
- Luhunga
- Mafinga
- Makungu
- Malangali
- Mapanda
- Mbalamaziwa
- Mdabulo
- Mninga
- Mpanga TAZARA
- Mtambula
- Mtwango
- Nyololo
- Rungemba
- Sadani

== Image gallery ==
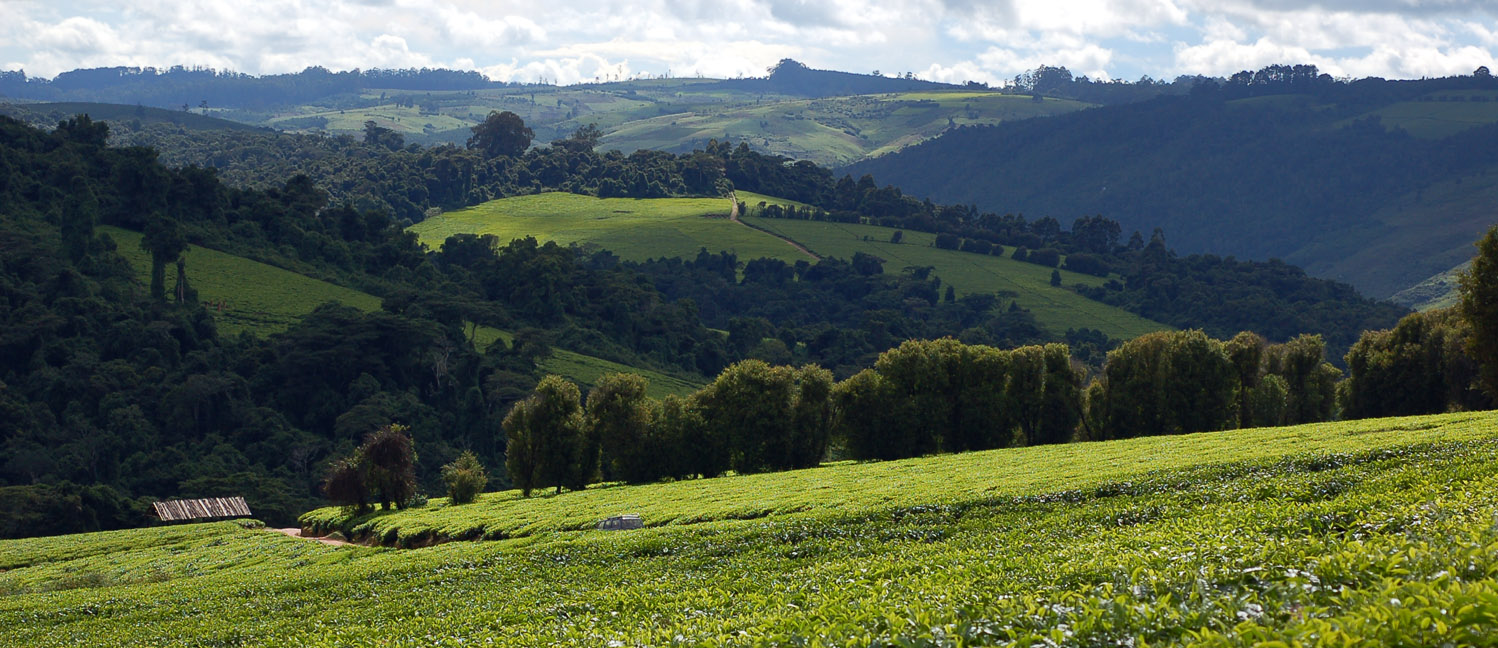
Tea fields, Maganga Tea Estates

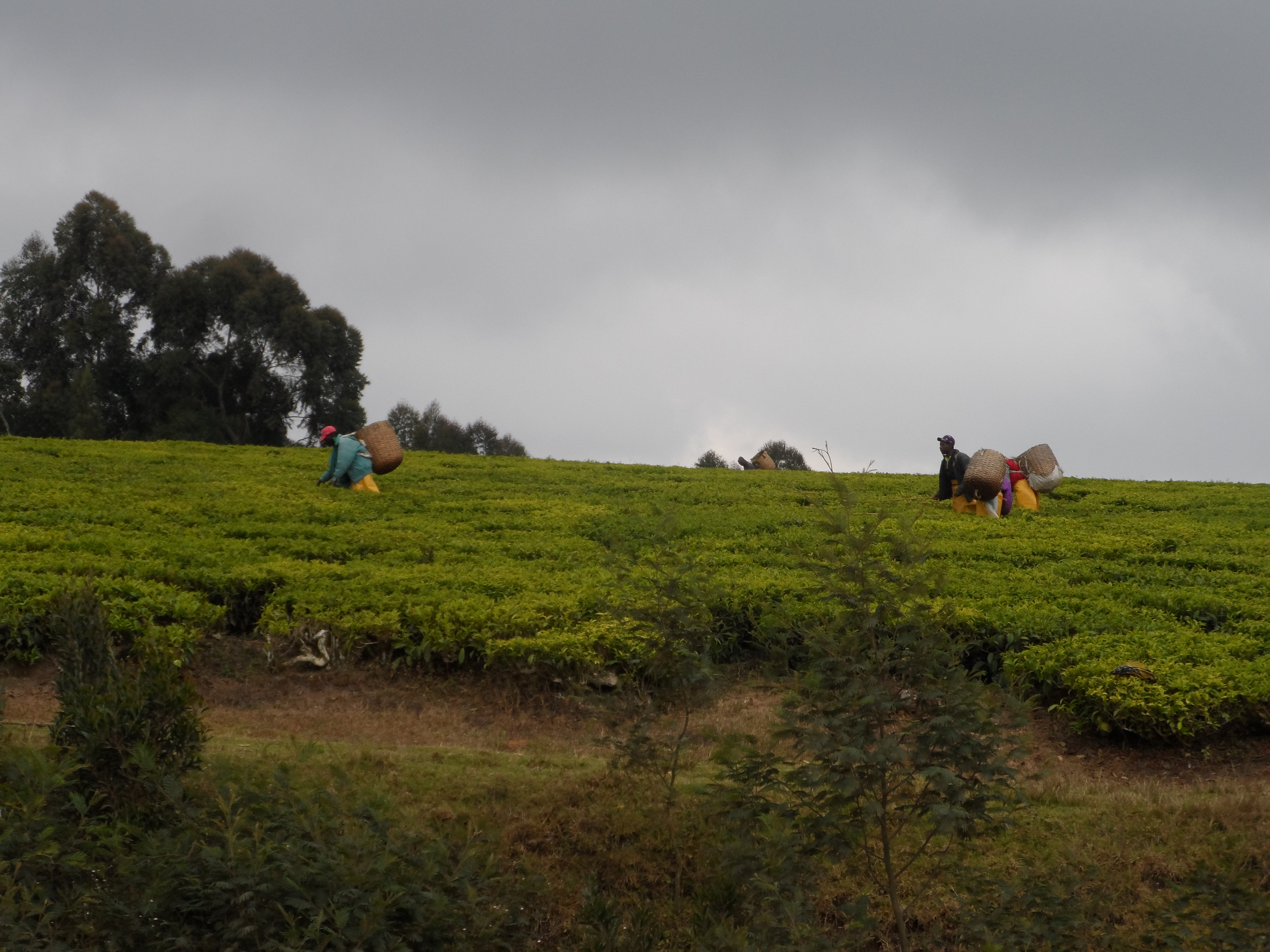
Picking tea. Mufindi tea farm

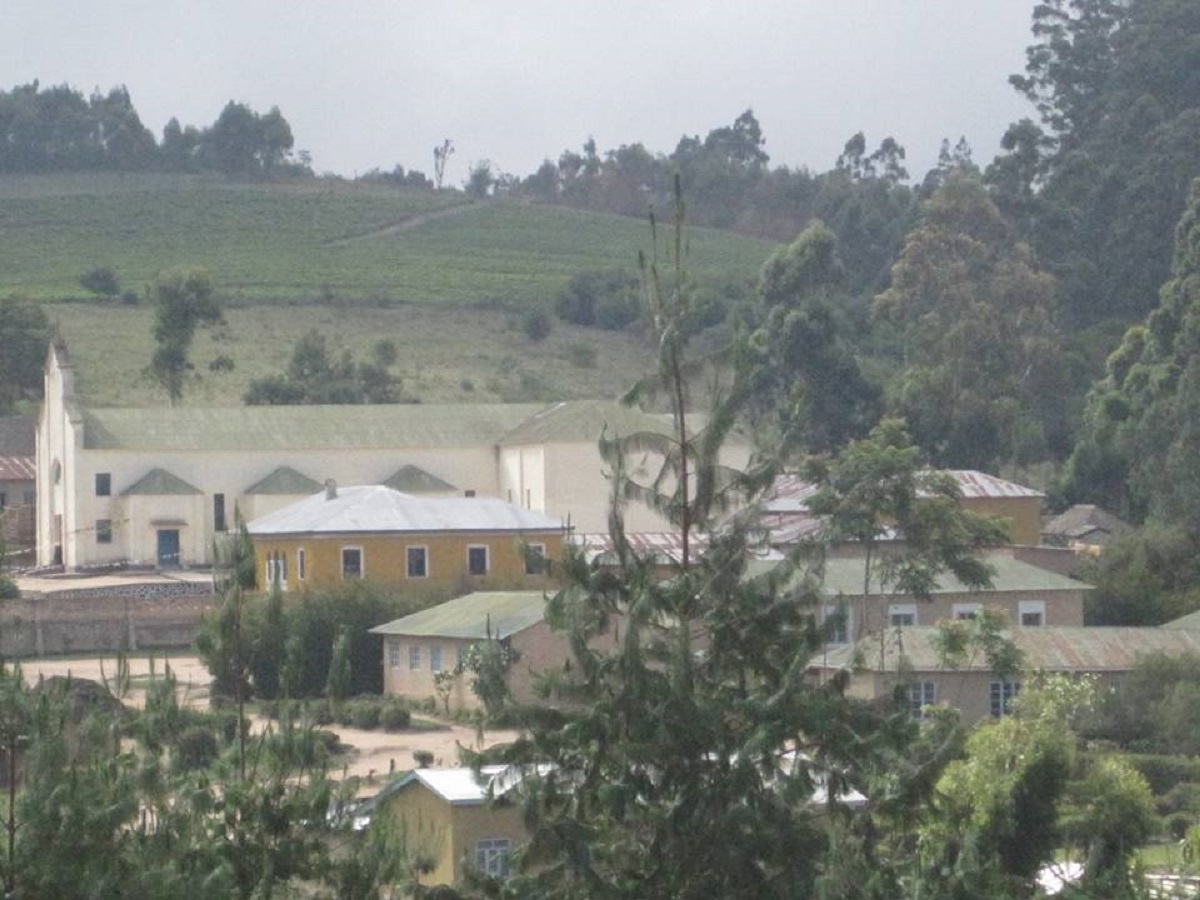
Ikwega mission

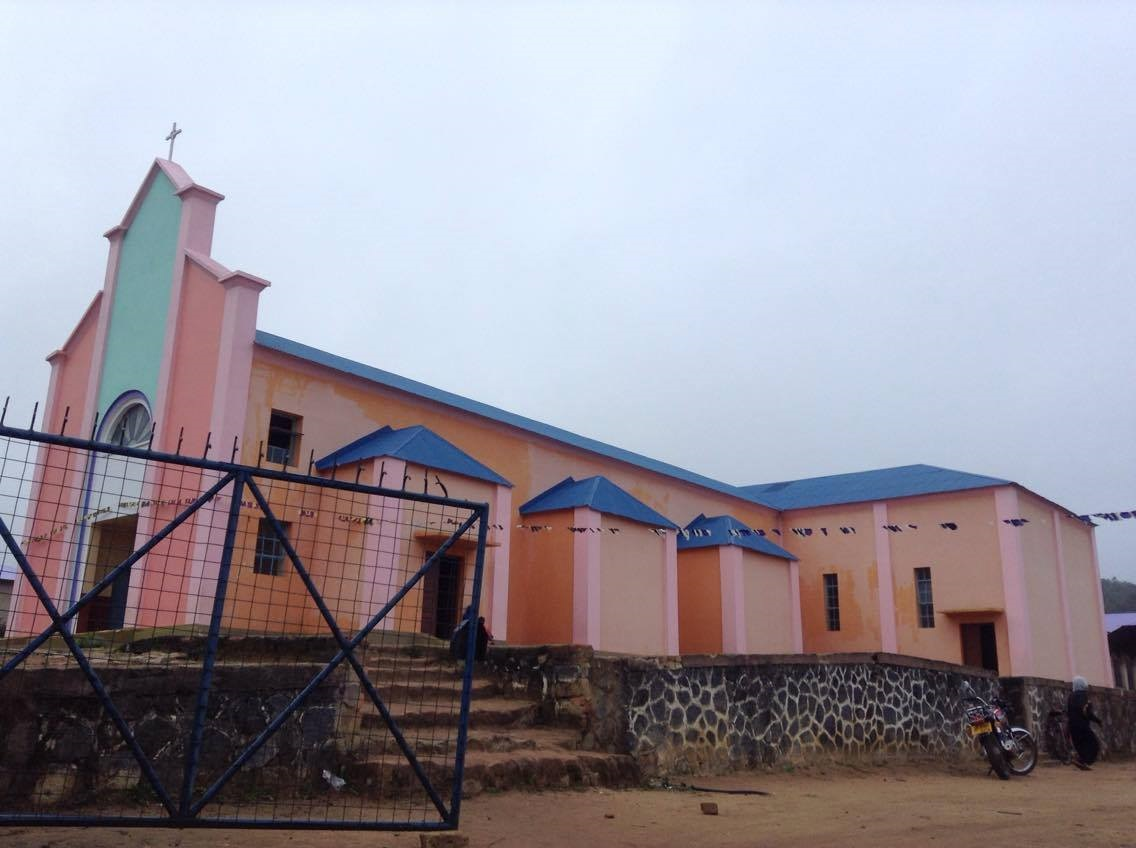
Catholic parish church, Iringa, Mufindi
