= Mgama =

Ward in Iringa, Tanzania

Mgama Kata ya Mgama
- Ward
- Location within Tanzania Location within Africa
- Coordinates: 7°41′S 35°14′E
- Country: Tanzania
- Region: Iringa Region
- District: Iringa Rural
- Ward: Mgama

Population (2016)
  - Total: 13,143
- Time zone: UTC+3 (EAT)
- Postcode: 51203

Mgama is an administrative ward in the Iringa Rural district of the Iringa Region of Tanzania. In 2016, the Tanzania National Bureau of Statistics report there were 13,143 people in the ward, from 12,561 in 2012.

== Villages / vitongoji ==
The ward has 5 villages and 44 vitongoji.

- Ibumila
  - Gezaulole
  - Ibumila A
  - Ibumila B
  - Kilewela
  - Kilimanjaro
  - Kipengele
  - Lugololelo B
  - Lwato
  - Lwato A
  - Lwato B
  - Makete A
  - Makete B
  - Mlenge A
  - Mlenge B
- Ilandutwa
  - Lugofu
  - Lugololelo A
  - Mayugi
  - Ndolela
  - Nyakatule A
  - nyakatule B
- Mgama
  - Isombe
  - Katenge ‘A’
  - Katenge ‘B’
  - Kihesa
  - Mbalamo
  - Mgama ‘A’
  - Mgama ‘B’
  - Mhagati
  - Msichoke
  - Myombwe
  - Wangama
  - Wilolesi
- Itwaga
  - Ikanavanu
  - Ilyango ‘A’
  - Ilyango ‘B’
  - Itwaga
  - Nunumala
- Ihemi
  - Igunga
  - Ihemi A
  - Kifumbi
  - Kilimahewa
  - Kilimanjaro
  - Mfaranyaki
  - Mjimwema
  - Njiapanda
  - Winome
