= Kihorogota =

Ward in Iringa, Tanzania

Kihorogota Kata ya Kihorogota
- Ward
- Location within Tanzania
- Coordinates: 7.447°S 35.822°E
- Country: Tanzania
- Region: Iringa Region
- District: Iringa Rural
- Ward: Kihorogota

Population (2016)
  - Total: 8,044
- Time zone: UTC+3 (EAT)
- Postcode: 51210

Kihorogota is an administrative ward in the Iringa Rural district of the Iringa Region of Tanzania. In 2016 the Tanzania National Bureau of Statistics report there were 8,044 people in the ward, from 7,688 in 2012.

== Villages / vitongoji ==
The ward has 8 villages and 28 vitongoji.

- Igula
  - Ilogombe
  - Madibila
  - Maganga
  - Nyambala
- Ismani (T)
  - Lugolola
  - Lwang’a
  - Lyanika
  - Mtiulaya
- Ivangwa
  - Ivangwa
  - Mdendami
- Kihorogota
  - Danida
  - Kihorogota
  - Mgugumbalo
  - Njiapanda
- Mikong'wi
  - Kichangani
  - Lupembe
  - Shuleni
  - Utitili
- Ndolela
  - Kibaoni
  - Ndolela
  - Ofisini
- Ngano
  - Godauni A
  - Godauni B
  - Lyaveya
  - Mwang’ingo
- Uhominyi
  - Tumaini
  - Ubena
  - Uhominyi
