= Wasa (Tanzanian ward) =

Ward in Iringa, Tanzania

Wasa Kata ya Wasa
- Ward
- Location within Tanzania Location within Africa
- Coordinates: 8°07′S 35°12′E
- Country: Tanzania
- Region: Iringa Region
- District: Iringa Rural
- Ward: Wasa

Population (2016)
  - Total: 11,086
- Time zone: UTC+3 (EAT)
- Postcode: 51214

Wasa is an administrative ward in the Iringa Rural district of the Iringa Region of Tanzania. In 2016 the Tanzania National Bureau of Statistics report there were 11,086 people in the ward, from 10,595 in 2012.

== Villages / vitongoji ==
The ward has 7 villages and 28 vitongoji.

- Wasa
  - Itawi
  - Kastamu
  - Nyakigongo
  - Nyamagola
  - Uhepwa
  - Utiga
- Ikungwe
  - Ikungwe
  - Makanyagio
  - Mkuta
  - Mkuzi
  - Tambalang’ombe
- Ufyambe Lwamanga
  - Ikonongo
  - Lunguya
- Usengelindete
  - Igula
  - Itimbo
  - Kigasa
  - Umwaga
- Ihomasa
  - Ihomasa
  - Lupande
  - Mkondowa
  - Muungano
  - Vikula
- Ulata
  - Mwefu
  - Ngonamwasi
  - Ulata
- Mahanzi
  - Kibulilo
  - Kitamba
  - Mahanzi
