= Maboga =

Ward in Iringa, Tanzania

Maboga Kata ya Maboga
- Ward
- Location within Tanzania
- Coordinates: 7.968°S 35.266°E
- Country: Tanzania
- Region: Iringa Region
- District: Iringa Rural District
- Ward: Maboga

Population (2016)
  - Total: 8,739
- Time zone: UTC+3 (EAT)
- Postcode: 51213

Maboga is an administrative ward in the Iringa Rural District of the Iringa Region of Tanzania. Maboga ward consist of 3 villages kiponzero, Magunga and Makongati.

In 2016 the Tanzania National Bureau of Statistics report there were 8,739 people in the ward, from 12,642 in 2012.

== Villages / vitongoji ==
The ward has 3 villages and 26 vitongoji.

- Magunga
  - Ihami
  - Lugailo
  - Mgogondele A
  - Mgogondele B
  - Minyala
  - Nguvukazi
- Makongati
  - Ikondo
  - Ilalasimba
  - Ilembula
  - Kibaoni
  - Lukali
  - Lunguya
  - Lutemi
  - Luwinda
  - Msasani
- Kiponzelo
  - Gendawuye
  - Kanisani
  - Lumumba
  - Madukani
  - Mjimwema
  - Mkwawa
  - Msalasi
  - Msombe
  - Ngongwa
  - Shuleni
  - Siyovelwa
