= Izazi =

Ward in Iringa, Tanzania

Izazi Kata ya Izazi
- Ward
- Location within Tanzania Location within Africa
- Coordinates: 7°12′S 35°44′E
- Country: Tanzania
- Region: Iringa Region
- District: Iringa Rural
- Ward: Izazi

Population (2016)
  - Total: 5,526
- Time zone: UTC+3 (EAT)
- Postcode: 51217

Izazi is an administrative ward in the Iringa Rural district of the Iringa Region of Tanzania. In 2016 the Tanzania National Bureau of Statistics report there were 5,526 people in the ward, from 5,281 in 2012.

== Villages / vitongoji ==
The ward has 3 villages and 17 vitongoji.

- Makuka
  - Itemagwe
  - Magombwe
  - Majengo
  - Makuka A
  - Makuka B
  - Mondomela
  - Nyamahato
- Izazi
  - Barabarani
  - Chekechea
  - Ihanyi
  - Izazi Madukani
  - Kiwanjani
  - Sokoni
- Mnadani
  - Kilamba Kitali
  - Mabati
  - Magungu
  - Mjimwema
  - Mnadani
