= Mivinjeni =

Ward in Iringa, Tanzania

Mivinjeni Kata ya Mivinjeni
- Ward
- Location within Tanzania
- Coordinates: 7.781°S 35.69°E
- Country: Tanzania
- Region: Iringa Region
- District: Iringa Urban
- Ward: Mivinjeni

Population (2016)
  - Total: 5,002
- Time zone: UTC+3 (EAT)
- Postcode: 51101

Mivinjeni is an administrative ward in the Iringa Urban district of the Iringa Region of Tanzania. In 2016 the Tanzania National Bureau of Statistics report there were 5,002 people in the ward, from 4,780 in 2012.

== Neighborhoods ==
The ward has 7 neighborhoods.

- Darajani
- Frelimo 'A'
- Idunda
- Kanisani
- Kondoa
- Migombani
- Mjimwema
