= Itunundu =

Ward in Iringa, Tanzania

Itunundu Kata ya Itunundu
- Ward
- Location within Tanzania Location within Africa
- Coordinates: 7°20′S 35°31′E
- Country: Tanzania
- Region: Iringa Region
- District: Iringa Rural
- Ward: Itunundu

Population (2016)
  - Total: 9,833
- Time zone: UTC+3 (EAT)
- Postcode: 51216

Itunundu is an administrative ward in the Iringa Rural district of the Iringa Region of Tanzania. In 2016 the Tanzania National Bureau of Statistics report there were 9,833 people in the ward, from 000 in 2012.

== Villages / vitongoji ==
The ward has 3 villages and 16 vitongoji.

- Itunundu
  - Changalawe
  - Ikolongo
  - Isele
  - Kibuegele
  - Kivukokalo
  - Majengo
  - Mbuyuni
  - Mkwajuni
- Kimande
  - Gundamnani
  - Kikuluhe
  - Kimande
  - Mjimwema
  - Mwaitenga
- Mbuyuni
  - Igodikafu
  - Mbuyuni
  - Ndolela
