= Idodi =

Ward in Iringa, Tanzania

Idodi Kata ya Idodi
- Ward
- Location within Tanzania Location within Africa
- Coordinates: 7°47′S 35°11′E
- Country: Tanzania
- Region: Iringa Region
- District: Iringa Rural
- Ward: Idodi

Population (2016)
  - Total: 10,675
- Time zone: UTC+3 (EAT)
- Postcode: 51219

Idodi is an administrative Division in the Iringa Rural District of the Iringa Region of Tanzania. In 2016, the Tanzania National Bureau of Statistics reported that there were 10,675 people in the ward, up from 10,202 in 2012.

The villages of Mahuninga, Makifu, Tungamalenga, Mapogoro, Kitisi and Malinzanga all fall within Idodi Division. The Division contains two Wards: Tungamalenga and Mlowa.

Idodi Division is immediately south of Ruaha National Park, Tanzania's largest Park.

== Villages / vitongoji ==
The ward has 4 villages and 22 vitongoji.

- Idodi
  - Ilamba
  - Mbuyuni “A”
  - Mbuyuni “B”
  - Mjimwema “A”
  - Mjimwema “B”
  - Msimbi
- Mapogoro
  - Idindiga
  - Kibaoni
  - Kisiwani
  - Kitanewa
  - Lungemba
  - Mapogoro
- Kitisi
  - Kitisi
  - Nyamnango
- Tungamalenga
  - Darajani
  - Kinyali
  - Malunde
  - Mbuyuni
  - Mlimani
  - Msembe
  - Ofisini
  - Zahanati
