= Ruaha =

Ruaha may refer to:

- Ruaha (Iringa Urban ward), a district in Iringa Region of Tanzania.
- Ruaha National Park, a park in Tanzania.
- The Great Ruaha River in Tanzania.
