= Chondrolepis similis =

Scientific classification
- Kingdom: Animalia
- Phylum: Arthropoda
- Class: Insecta
- Order: Lepidoptera
- Family: Hesperiidae
- Genus: Chondrolepis
- Species: C. similis

Binomial name
- Chondrolepis similis de Jong, 1986

Species of butterfly

Chondrolepis similis is a species of butterfly in the family Hesperiidae. It is found in Tanzania from the Southern Highlands to Mufindi.
