= Mkwawa (Tanzanian ward) =

Ward in Iringa, Tanzania

Mkwawa Kata ya Mkwawa
- Ward
- Location within Tanzania
- Coordinates: 7.765°S 35.668°E
- Country: Tanzania
- Region: Iringa Region
- District: Iringa Urban
- Ward: Mkwawa

Population (2016)
  - Total: 10,122
- Time zone: UTC+3 (EAT)
- Postcode: 51111

Mkwawa is an administrative ward in the Iringa Urban district of the Iringa Region of Tanzania. In 2016 the Tanzania National Bureau of Statistics report there were 10,122 people in the ward, from 9,673 in 2012.

== Neighborhoods ==
The ward has 15 neighborhoods.

- Bwawani "A"
- Bwawani 'B'
- Don Bosco 'A'
- Don Bosco 'B'
- Hoho
- Ikonongo 'A'
- Ikonongo 'B'
- Imalanongwa A
- Imalanongwa B
- Itamba
- Lukosi
- Mgera
- Mkwawa Chuo
- Wazo 'A'
- Wazo 'B'
