= Mninga =

Ward in Mufindi, Iringa, Tanzania

Mninga Kata ya Mninga
- Ward
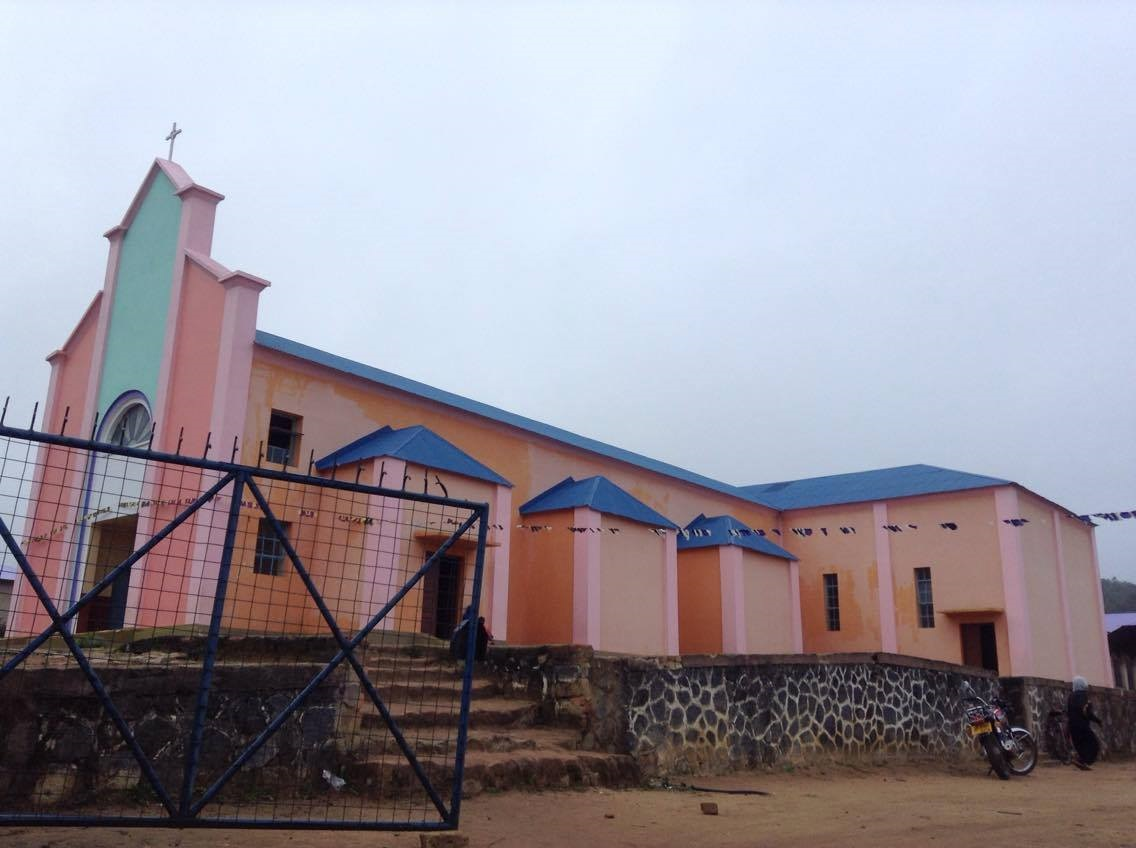
- Ikwega Catholic Parish in Mninga District

- Location within Tanzania
- Coordinates: 8.6067508°S 35.2082913°E
- Country: Tanzania
- Region: Iringa Region
- District: Mufindi District
- Ward: Mninga

Population (2016)
  - Total: 15,485
- Time zone: UTC+3 (EAT)

Mninga is an administrative ward in the Mufindi District of the Iringa Region of Tanzania, East Africa.

In 2016 the Tanzania National Bureau of Statistics report there were 15,485 people in the ward, from 14,799 in 2012.
