= Geline Fuko =

Tanzanian lawyer and human rights activist

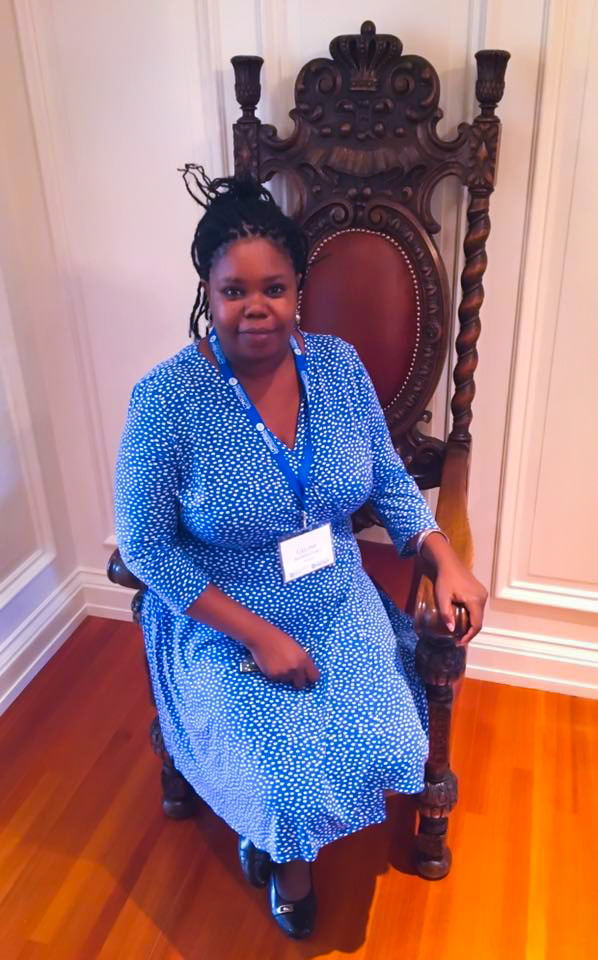
- Picture of Geline Fuko
- Born: Iringa, Southern Tanzania
- Citizenship: Tanzania
- Education: University of Dar Es Salaam, University of Trento, Corvinus University of Budapest
- Occupations: Attorney High Court of Tanzania, Human Rights Activist

Adv. Geline Alfred Fuko is a Tanzanian lawyer and human rights activist who is a graduate of the Joint European Master in Comparative Local Development This is an Erasmus Mundus Joint Master's programme at the University of Trento Italy, Financed by the European Union Commission Geline is a 2022 Draper Hills fellow at Stanford University with the Centre on Democracy, Development and the Rule of Law, Freeman Spogli Institute. She has helped to promote democracy in Tanzania in organisations such as Tangible Initiatives For Local Development Tanzania (TIFLD) She was instrumental in designing and managing the first and the only Online Public Database on constitutional resources. In 2016, she was granted a Mandela Washington Fellowship. Her achievements were specifically highlighted by President Obama at the YALI Presidential Summit in Washington, D.C. on 3 August 2016.

== Early life ==
Born in Iringa Region of southern Tanzania, her early education was partly in rural Tanzania in the following regions Ruvuma, Tanga and few months in Singida. Later, she moved to Dar Es salaam for secondary education before joining a law school at the University of Dar Es Salaam, graduating in 2007. In 2010, she embarked on an Erasmus Mundus master's degree, spending most of her study time in Trento, Trentino Alto Adige Province in Northern Italy, and shorter periods at Corvinus University in Budapest, Hungary, and with United Nations Volunteers in Bonn, Germany. She then returned to Italy where earned double master's degree certificates from the University of Trento and Corvinus University of Budapest in 2012. Prior to Italy, Geline attended courses for credit; Human Rights course at the University of Strasbourg France coordinated by the Institut International des Droits de l'Homme. In 2014 She attended a course for credit at Central European University in Budapest Hungary where she studied the Constitution making in Africa.

== Career ==
As a graduate lawyer, and an advocate of the High Court and Subordinate Courts Tanzania, thanks to her interest in human rights, Fuko first worked with Legal and Human Rights Centre, a non-governmental and human rights organisation in Tanzania where she followed parliament sessions and emerging legislation, providing information services for the public. On returning from her Erasmus studies, she worked with various human rights organisations including Media Institute of Southern Africa, Tanzania chapter (Misa Tan), SIKIKA, Open Society Initiatives for Eastern Africa (managing two portfolios; Freedom of Expression and Anti -corruption) for six Eastern African countries. In 2014 -2016 Geline went back to work with Legal and Human Rights Centre headed the Online Public Database on Constitutional Resources, supporting public with information on how the constitution is written, translated and implemented Tanzania's constitution She designed digital management system for administration of public engagement with the resource centre. Geline worked with Tanzania Civil Society Consortium for Election Observation (TACCEO), she head the election observation centre, the centre that coordinated information flows from long and short term election observers and data clerks 2015 Tanzanian general election.

In 2016, Fuko was selected for a Mandela Washington Fellowship which provided her with academic and leadership training in the United States. During the fellowship, she was placed with Presidential Precinct in Charlottesville Virginia and hosted by the University of Virginia, the College of William and Mary, Morven Farm, and three presidential homes, Thomas Jefferson, James Monroe and James Madison. Those who had participated in the courses attended a reception in the Omni Shoreham Hotel in Washington DC . In his address to over 1,000 people and media who attended the event, President Obama specifically highlighted the achievements of Fuko:

"America is gonna keep standing with Activists like Geline Fuko of Tanzania... Geline is a lawyer, and human rights activist. A few years ago, she thought people in Tanzania should be able to use their mobile phones to read their constitution, so she went out and designed Tanzania's first database of constitutional resources, opening up her government to more of her people so they could understand their law and their rights and their responsibilities. So thank you so much, Geline, for the great work."

Fuko later commented that she never remotely imagined that her contribution to Tanzanian society would be acknowledged by someone as famous as President Obama.

She says that she enjoys being a music producer and performing hip hop.

When interviewed by Salima Hamisi of Hamasa Magazine in 2018, Geline Fuko concluded: "I have a burning desire to see a better Tanzania and I believe there are youth who can make it happen with a combination of efforts, will, determination, coordination and support. She is a recipient of multiple local and international awards for her engagement in community work in Tanzania"

Adv. Geline is the Founder and the Executive Director of Tangible Initiatives for Local Development Tanzania (TIFLD). It is a tech driven NGO registered in Tanzania. TIFLD's mission is to contribute to the development of policies and laws that promotes democratic principles, strengthening institutions, mainstream the marginalised and build resilient communities. They work to promote sustainable development through participatory approach and innovative tools.".
