= Chondrolepis leggei =

Scientific classification
- Kingdom: Animalia
- Phylum: Arthropoda
- Class: Insecta
- Order: Lepidoptera
- Family: Hesperiidae
- Genus: Chondrolepis
- Species: C. leggei

Binomial name
- Chondrolepis leggei (Heron, 1909)

Synonyms
- Chioneigia leggei Heron, 1909

Species of butterfly

Chondrolepis leggei is a species of butterfly in the family Hesperiidae. It is found in the eastern part of the Democratic Republic of the Congo, Uganda and western Kenya. It was first described by Francis Arthur Heron in 1909 and originally named Chioneigia leggei. It is named in honour of Gerald Legge, a participant of the British Museum Ruwenzori expedition 1905-1906.
