= Chondrolepis =

Scientific classification
- Kingdom: Animalia
- Phylum: Arthropoda
- Class: Insecta
- Order: Lepidoptera
- Family: Hesperiidae
- Tribe: Astictopterini
- Genus: Chondrolepis; Mabille, 1904

Synonyms
- Chioneigia Heron, 1909

Genus of butterflies

Chondrolepis is a genus of skippers in the family Hesperiidae. The name Chondrolepis (meaning "thick scales") derives from Greek words: chondros (meaning "thick") and lepis (meaning "scale").

== Species ==
- Chondrolepis cynthia Evans, 1936
- Chondrolepis ducarmei T.B. Larsen & Congdon, 2012
- Chondrolepis leggei (Heron, 1909)
- Chondrolepis nero Evans, 1937
- Chondrolepis niveicornis (Plötz, 1883)
- Chondrolepis obscurior de Jong, 1986
- Chondrolepis similis de Jong, 1986
- Chondrolepis telisignata (Butler, 1896)
- Chondrolepis uluguru T.B. Larsen & Congdon, 2012
