= Iringa Rural District =

District in Iringa, Tanzania

Coordinates: 7.7693°S 35.7030°E

Iringa District
- Iringa District of Iringa Region
- Country: Tanzania
- Region: Iringa Region
- District: Iringa Rural District

Population (2022 census)
  - Total: 315,354
- Time zone: UTC+3 (EAT)
- Postcode: 512xx

Iringa Rural District (Wilaya ya Iringa Vijijini) is one of the four districts of the Iringa Region of Tanzania, East Africa. It is bordered to the north by the Dodoma Region, to the east by Kilolo District and encircles Iringa Urban District, to the south by the Mufindi District, to the southwest by the Mbeya Region and to the northwest by the Singida Region.

In 2016 the Tanzania National Bureau of Statistics report there were 265,811 people in the district, from 254,032 in 2012. By 2022, the population had grown to 315,354.

== Wards ==
Iringa Rural District was administratively divided into twenty wards

- Idodi
- Ifunda
- Ilolo Mpya
- Itunundu
- Izazi
- Kalenga
- Kihorogota
- Kiwere
- Lumuli
- Maboga
- Mahuninga
- Magulilwa
- Malengamakali
- Mgama
- Mlowa
- Mseke
- Nduli
- Nzihi
- Ulanda
- Wasa
