= Chondrolepis cynthia =

Scientific classification
- Kingdom: Animalia
- Phylum: Arthropoda
- Class: Insecta
- Order: Lepidoptera
- Family: Hesperiidae
- Genus: Chondrolepis
- Species: C. cynthia

Binomial name
- Chondrolepis cynthia Evans, 1936

Species of butterfly

Chondrolepis cynthia is a species of butterfly in the family Hesperiidae. It is found in the eastern part of the Democratic Republic of the Congo and south-western Uganda.
