= Chondrolepis ducarmei =

Scientific classification
- Kingdom: Animalia
- Phylum: Arthropoda
- Class: Insecta
- Order: Lepidoptera
- Family: Hesperiidae
- Genus: Chondrolepis
- Species: C. ducarmei

Binomial name
- Chondrolepis ducarmei T.B. Larsen & Congdon, 2012

Species of butterfly

Chondrolepis ducarmei is a species of butterfly in the family Hesperiidae. It is found in the Democratic Republic of the Congo and is endemic to the Albertine Rift. The habitat consists of submontane areas.
