= Ilala (Iringa Urban ward) =

Ward in Iringa, Tanzania

Ilala Kata ya Ilala
- Ward
- Location within Tanzania
- Coordinates: 7.769°S 35.687°E
- Country: Tanzania
- Region: Iringa Region
- District: Iringa Urban
- Ward: Ilala

Population (2016)
  - Total: 4,654
- Time zone: UTC+3 (EAT)
- Postcode: 51105

Ilala is an administrative ward in the Iringa Urban district of the Iringa Region of Tanzania. In 2016 the Tanzania National Bureau of Statistics report there were 4,654 people in the ward, from 4,448 in 2012.

== Neighborhoods ==
The ward has 7 neighborhoods.

- Dabobado
- Embakasi
- Kajificheni
- Lami A
- Lami B
- Mlamke
- Nyumba Tatu
