= Ruaha (Iringa Urban ward) =

Ward in Iringa, Tanzania

Ruaha Kata ya Ruaha
- Ward
- Location within Tanzania
- Coordinates: 7.788°S 35.72°E
- Country: Tanzania
- Region: Iringa Region
- District: Iringa Urban
- Ward: Ruaha

Population (2016)
  - Total: 13,401
- Time zone: UTC+3 (EAT)
- Postcode: 51114

Ruaha is an administrative ward in the Iringa Urban district of the Iringa Region of Tanzania. In 2016 the Tanzania National Bureau of Statistics report there were 13,401 people in the ward, from 16,984 in 2012.

== Neighborhoods ==
The ward has 13 neighborhoods.

- Buguruni
- Chuo
- Ipogolo 'A'
- Ipogolo 'B'
- Ipogolo 'C'
- Ipogolo 'D'
- Ipogolo 'E'
- Kinegamgosi 'A'
- Kinegamgosi 'B'
- Kinegamgosi 'C'
- Mwagongo
- Ngeleli
- Tagamenda
