= Mufindi =

- Town
- Location in Tanzania
- Coordinates: 08°35′40″S 035°17′20″E
- Country: Tanzania
- Region: Iringa Region
- District: Mufindi District
- Time zone: UTC+3 (EAT)
- UFI: -2570450
- Climate: Cwb

Mufindi is a town in Mufindi District in the Iringa Region of the Tanzanian Southern Highlands. It is located in the Boma/Mafinga ward. As of 2002, the population of the town was about 5,000.
