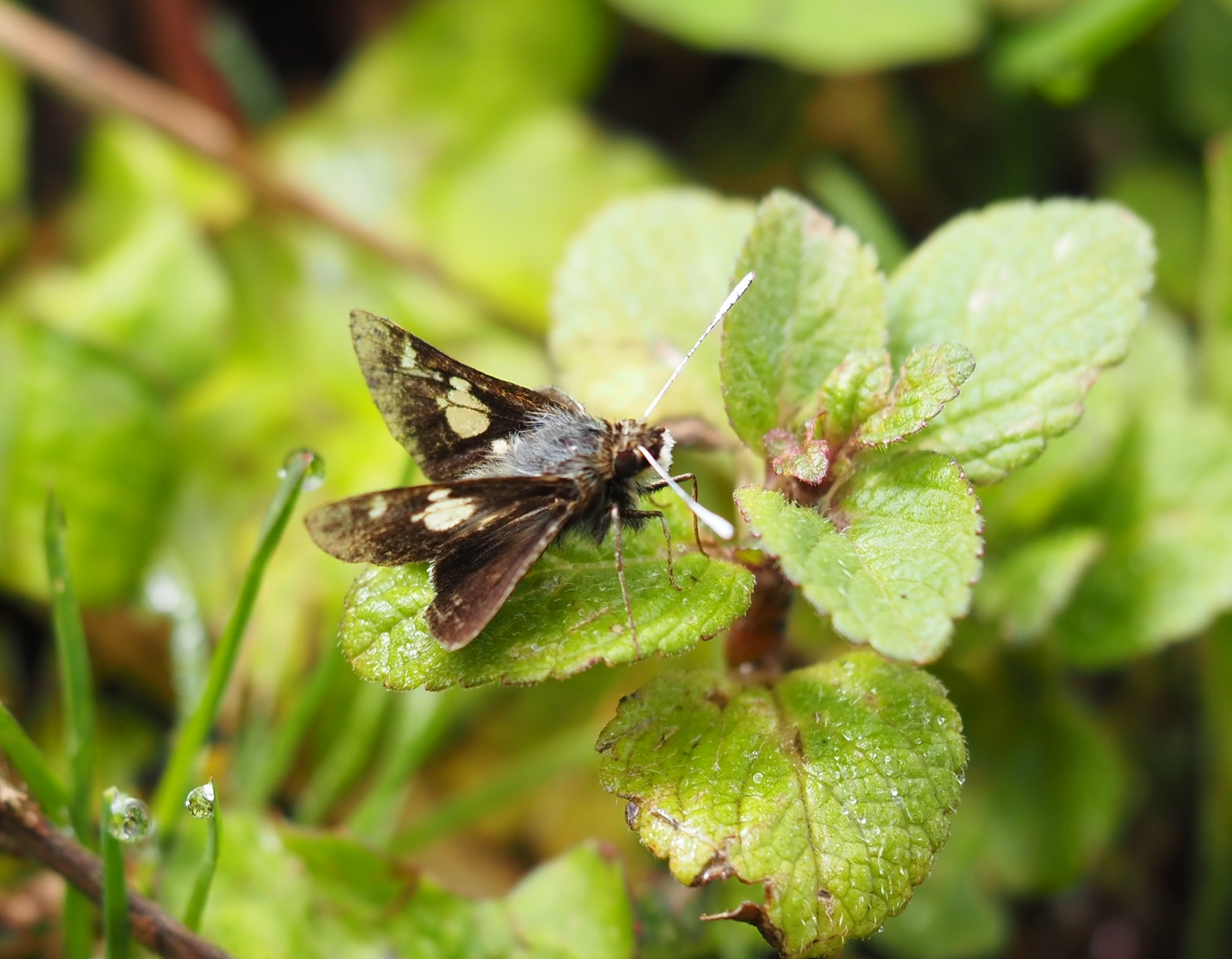

Scientific classification
- Kingdom: Animalia
- Phylum: Arthropoda
- Class: Insecta
- Order: Lepidoptera
- Family: Hesperiidae
- Genus: Chondrolepis
- Species: C. telisignata

Binomial name
- Chondrolepis telisignata (Butler, 1896)

Synonyms
- Perichares telisignata Butler, 1896

= Chondrolepis telisignata =

Species of butterfly

Chondrolepis telisignata is a species of butterfly in the family Hesperiidae. It is found in central and southern Kenya, southern Tanzania, northern Malawi and Zambia.
