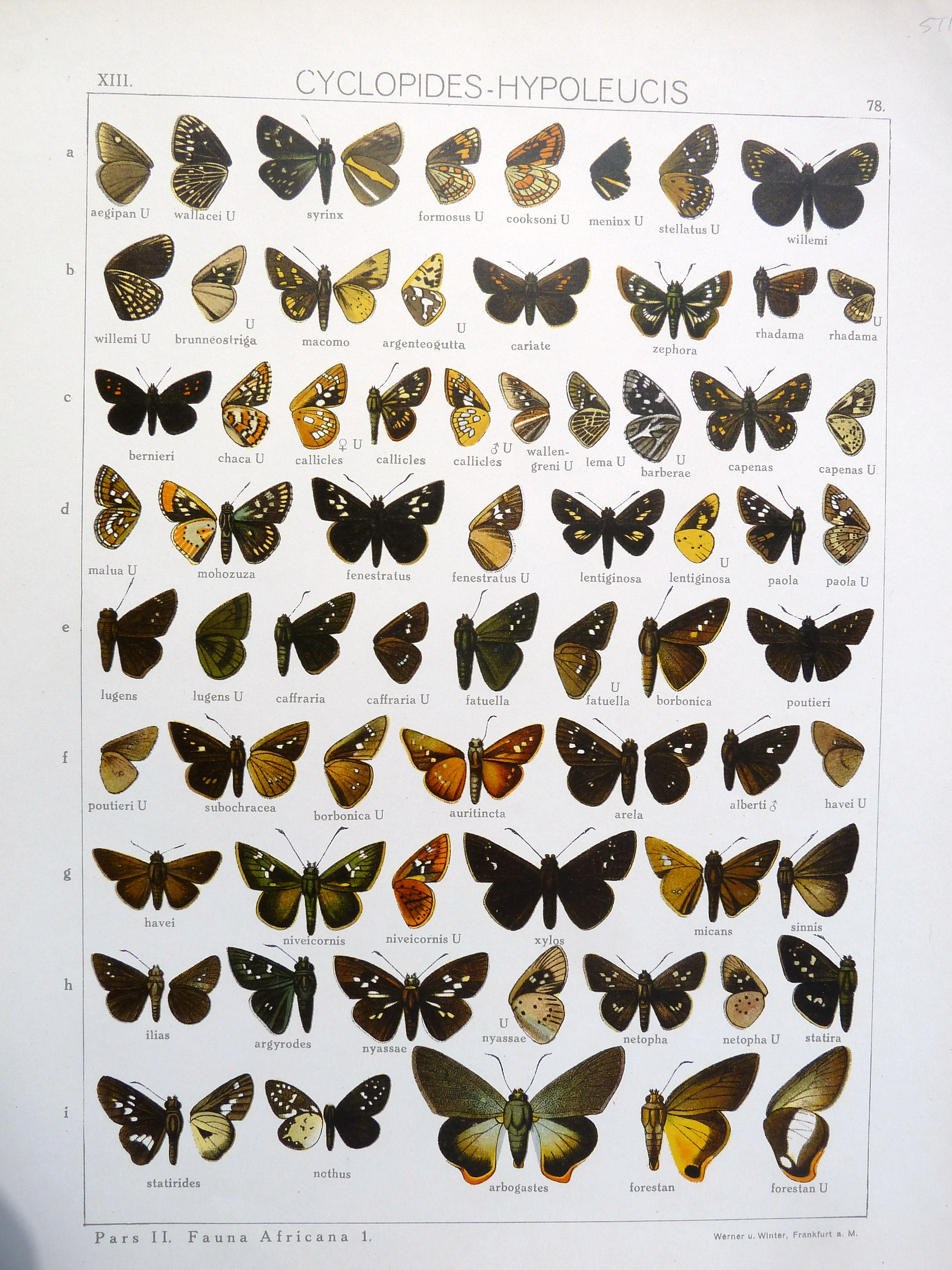
- in seitz f

Scientific classification
- Kingdom: Animalia
- Phylum: Arthropoda
- Class: Insecta
- Order: Lepidoptera
- Family: Hesperiidae
- Genus: Chondrolepis
- Species: C. niveicornis

Binomial name
- Chondrolepis niveicornis (Plötz, 1883)

Synonyms
- Hesperia niveicornis Plötz, 1883; Pamphila murga Mabille, 1890; Pamphila chirala Trimen, 1894; Perichares albicornis Butler, 1896; Kedestes mirandus Butler, 1902

= Chondrolepis niveicornis =

Species of butterfly

Chondrolepis niveicornis, also known as the snow-horned nightfighter or common snow-horned skipper, is a species of butterfly in the family Hesperiidae. It is found in Nigeria, Cameroon, Angola, the Democratic Republic of the Congo, Sudan, Ethiopia, Uganda, Rwanda, Kenya, Tanzania, Malawi, Zambia, Mozambique and Zimbabwe. The habitat consists of damp and marshy areas, stream banks and tall grass at the edges of submontane forests.

Adults are attracted to flowers. They are on wing in September and from January to May.

The larvae feed on Panicum deustum and Imperata cylindrica.

== Subspecies ==
- Chondrolepis niveicornis niveicornis (Nigeria, Cameroon, Angola, eastern Democratic Republic of the Congo, southern Sudan, Uganda, Rwanda, Kenya, Tanzania, Malawi, Zambia, Mozambique, eastern Zimbabwe)
- Chondrolepis niveicornis pseudonero Berger, 1984 (Ethiopia)
