= Ifunda =

Ward in Iringa, Tanzania

Ifunda Kata ya Ifunda
- Ward
- Location within Tanzania
- Coordinates: 8.047°S 35.468°E
- Country: Tanzania
- Region: Iringa Region
- District: Iringa Rural
- Ward: Ifunda

Population (2016)
  - Total: 12,765
- Time zone: UTC+3 (EAT)
- Postcode: 51212

Ifunda is an administrative ward in the Iringa Rural district of the Iringa Region of Tanzania. In 2016 the Tanzania National Bureau of Statistics report there were 12,765 people in the ward, from 12,199 in 2012.

== Villages / vitongoji ==
The ward has 6 villages and 30 vitongoji.

- Ifunda
  - Kibaoni A
  - Kilimahewa A
  - Kipera
  - Mgondo
  - Ulolage
  - Utibesa
- Bandabichi
  - Bandabichi
  - Ifunda Sekondari
  - Ihagaha
  - Kibaoni B
  - Kilimahewa B
  - Kivalali A
  - Kivalali B
  - Mlafu
  - Isupilo
- Kibena
  - Isenuka
  - Kwa Mama Fred
  - Kalonga
  - Kitasengwa
  - Lutitili
  - Ubalanzi
  - Ulyangwada
- Mfukulembe
  - Igulumiti B
  - Igulumti A
  - Lyasa
  - Ndolela
- Udumka
  - Ikungu
  - Ofisini
  - Utulo
- Mibikimitali
  - Masimike
  - Mibikimitali
  - Ulangala
