= Chondrolepis nero =

Scientific classification
- Kingdom: Animalia
- Phylum: Arthropoda
- Class: Insecta
- Order: Lepidoptera
- Family: Hesperiidae
- Genus: Chondrolepis
- Species: C. nero

Binomial name
- Chondrolepis nero Evans, 1937

Species of butterfly

Chondrolepis nero, commonly known as the Cameroon snow-horned skipper, is a species of butterfly in the family Hesperiidae. It is found in Nigeria and Cameroon. The habitat consists of areas above an altitude of 1,500 meters near submontane forest.
