= Mafinga =

District of Iringa, Tanzania

Mafinga Mji wa Mafinga
- Ward
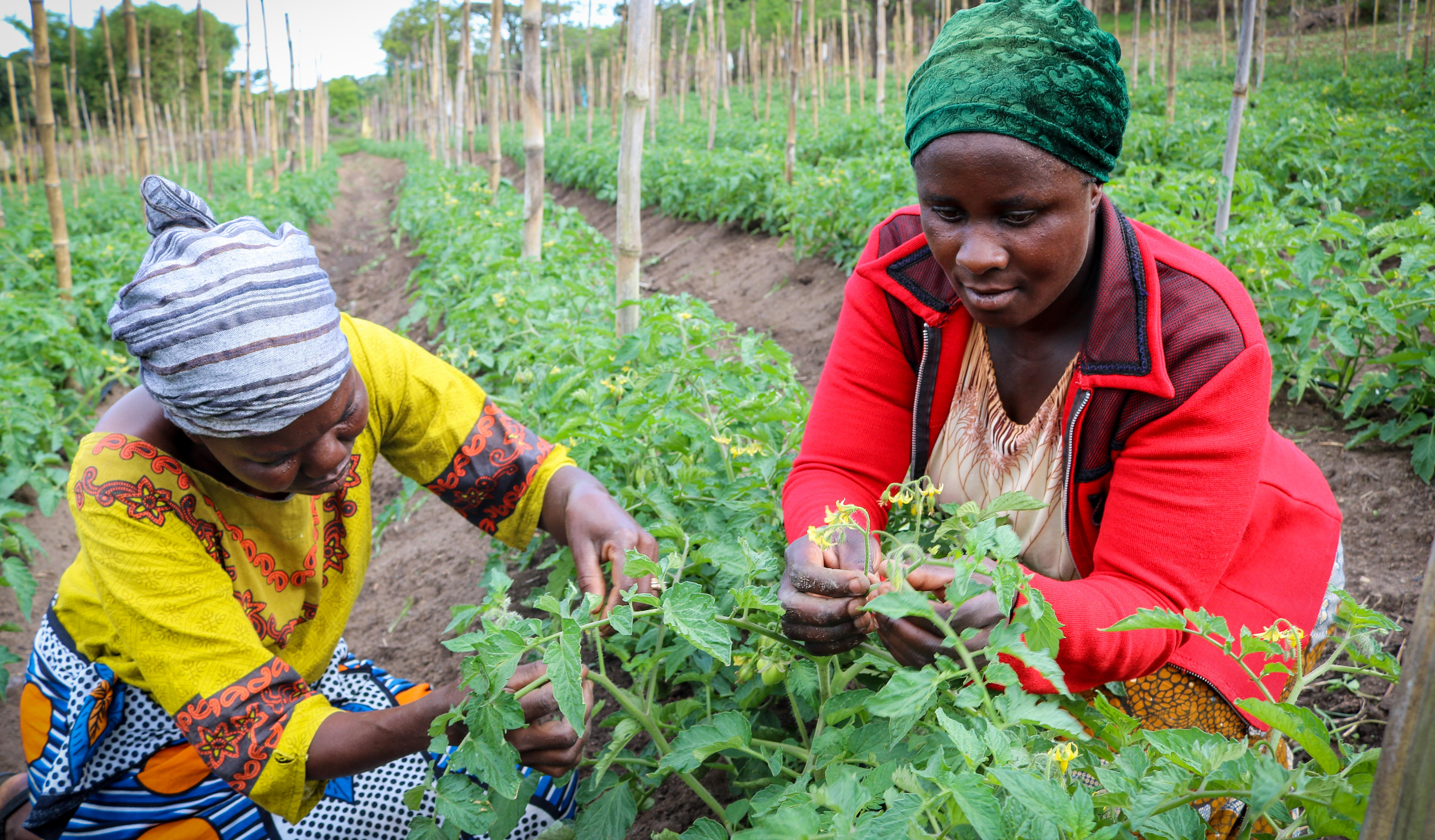
- Tuamini farmers in Mafinga, Tanzania

- Mafinga Town District of Iringa Region
- Coordinates: 8.29677105°S 35.29576776°E
- Country: Tanzania
- Region: Iringa Region

Government
  - Type: Council

Area
  - Total: 953 km^{2} (368 sq mi)
- Elevation: 1,871 m (6,138 ft)

Population (2016)
  - Total: 74,963
  - Density: 78.7/km^{2} (204/sq mi)
- Time zone: UTC+3 (EAT)
- Website: District Website

Mafinga Town Council is one of the five districts of the Iringa Region of Tanzania.

In 2016, the Tanzania National Bureau of Statistics report there were 74,963 people in the town; this is up from 51,902 in 2012.
