= MV Iringa =

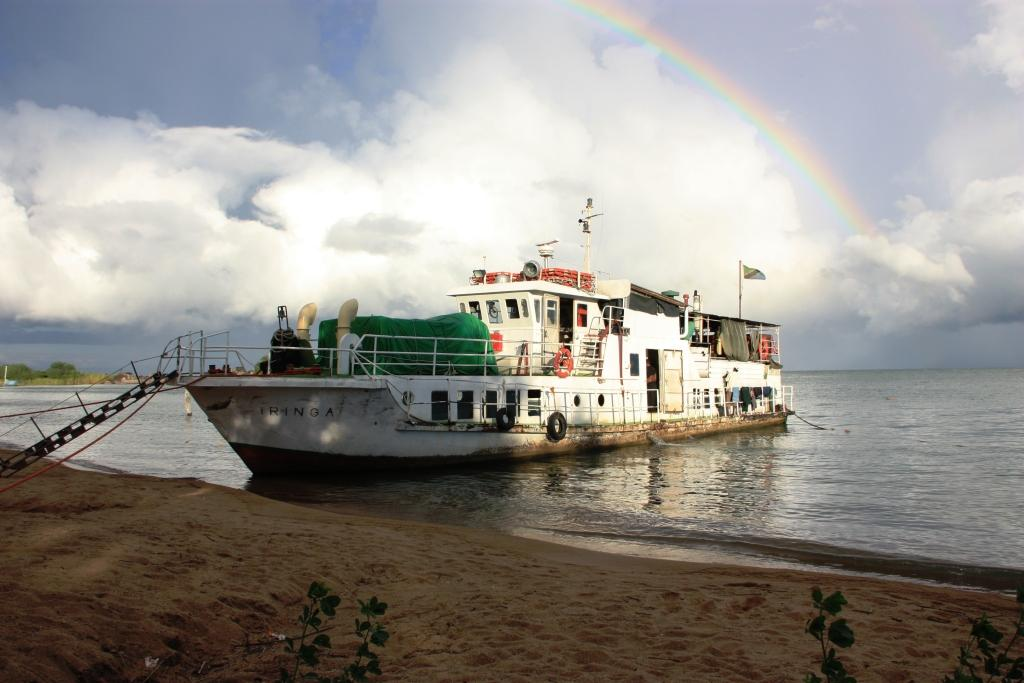
- MV Iringa anchored at Liuli harbour, Tanzania in 2012

History
- Name: MV Iringa
- Acquired: 1974
- Fate: Transferred to Tanzania

History

Tanzania
- Name: MV Iringa
- Operator: Marine Services Company
- Acquired: 1977
- Status: in service

General characteristics
- Type: ferry
- Tonnage: 199 GRT
- Speed: 10 knots
- Capacity: 125 passengers; 10 tonne cargo

MV Iringa is a ferry operated by the Marine Services Company of Tanzania on Lake Nyasa.
