= Kilolo District =

District of Iringa Region, Tanzania

Coordinates: 7°24′S 35°09′E

- District
- Kilolo District of Iringa Region
- Country: Tanzania
- Region: Iringa Region
- District: Kilolo District

Area
  - Total: 9,243 km^{2} (3,569 sq mi)

Population (2022 census)
  - Total: 263,559
  - Density: 28.51/km^{2} (73.85/sq mi)

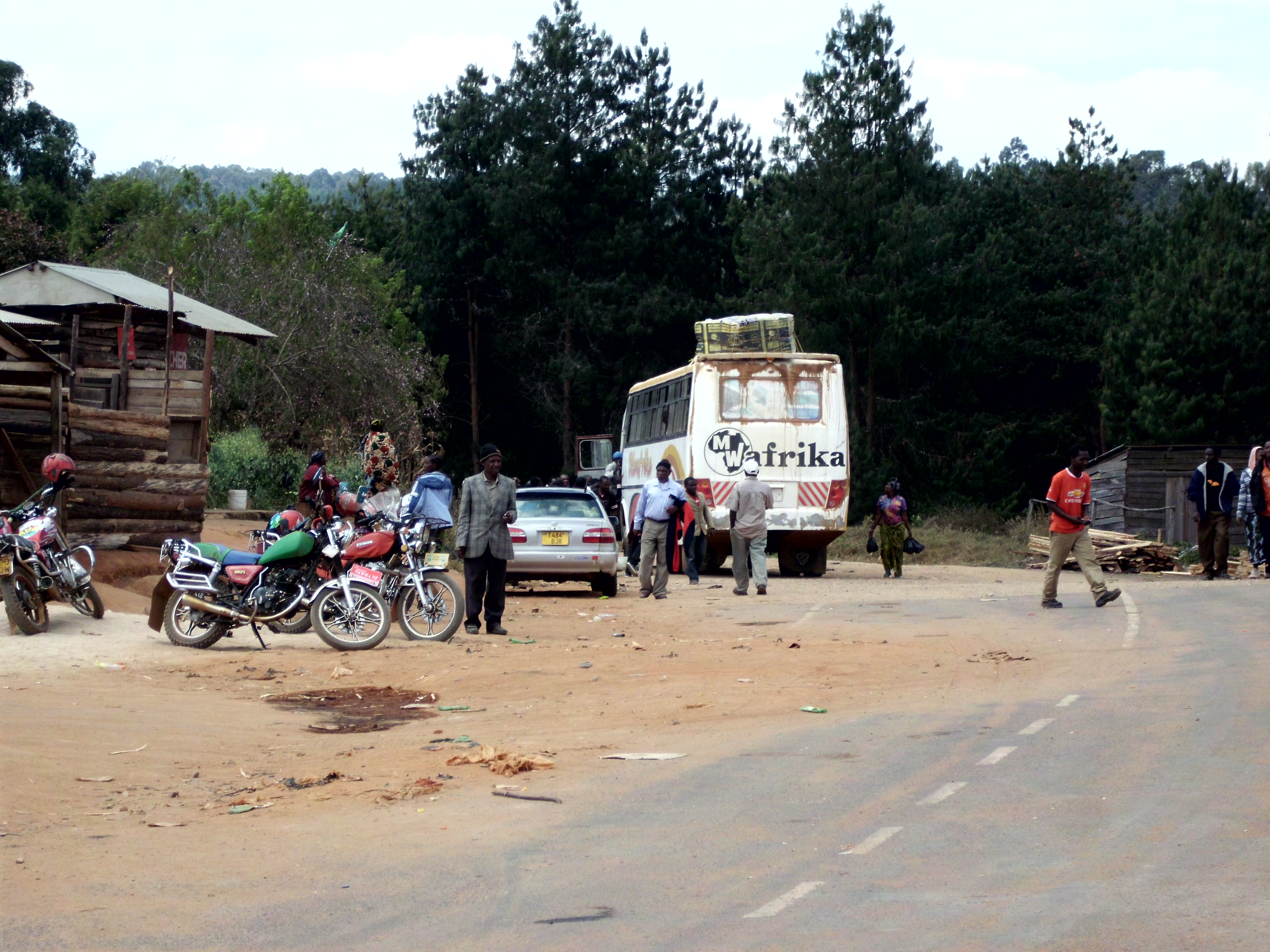
Road transport in Kilolo District.

Kilolo is one of the four districts of the Iringa Region of Tanzania. It is bordered to the north and east by the Morogoro Region, to the south by Mufindi District and to the west by the Iringa Rural District. The district is home to the Udzungwa Mountains National Park.

According to the 2002 Tanzania National Census, the population of the Kilolo District was 205,081. According to the 2022 Tanzania National Census, the population of Kilolo District was 263,559.

== Administrative subdivisions ==
=== Constituencies ===
For parliamentary elections, Tanzania is divided into constituencies. As of the 2010 elections Kilolo District had one constituency:

- Kilolo Constituency

=== Divisions ===
1. Mazombe 2. Mahenge 3.Kilolo

=== Wards ===
As of 2015, Kilolo District is administratively divided into wards:

- Bomalang'ombe
- Dabaga
- Ibumu
- Idete
- Ihimbo
- Ilula
- Image
- Irole
- Kising'a
- Kimala
- Kitowo
- Lugalo
- Mahenge
- Masisiwe
- Mawambala
- Mlafu
- Mtitu
- Ng'ang'ange
- Ng'uruhe
- Nyalumbu
- Nyanzwa
- Ruaha Mbuyuni
- Udekwa
- Uhambingeto
- Ukumbi
- Ukwega
- Winome
