= Iringa Urban District =

- District
- Iringa Municipal of Iringa Region
- Coordinates: 07°46′57″S 35°41′59″E
- Country: Tanzania
- Region: Iringa Region
- District: Iringa Urban District

Government
  - Type: City Council

Area
  - Total: 142.5 sq mi (369.1 km^{2})

Population (2022 Census)
  - Total: 202,490
  - Density: 1,421/sq mi (548.6/km^{2})
- Time zone: GMT + 3

Iringa Urban District is one of the five districts of the Iringa Region of Tanzania. It is bordered to the north, east, and west by the Iringa Rural District and to the south by the Kilolo District.

According to the 2022 census, the population of the Iringa Urban District was 202,490.

== Wards ==
The Iringa Municipality is administratively divided into 18 wards:

- Gangilonga
- Igumbilo
- Ipogolo
- Ilala
- Isakalilo
- Kihesa
- Kitanzini
- Kitwiru
- Kwakilosa
- Makorongoni
- Mivinjeni
- Mkwawa
- Mlandege
- Mshindo
- Mtwivila
- Mwangata
- Nduli
- Ruaha
