= Iringa Region =

Region of Tanzania

Iringa Region Mkoa wa Iringa (Swahili)
- Region
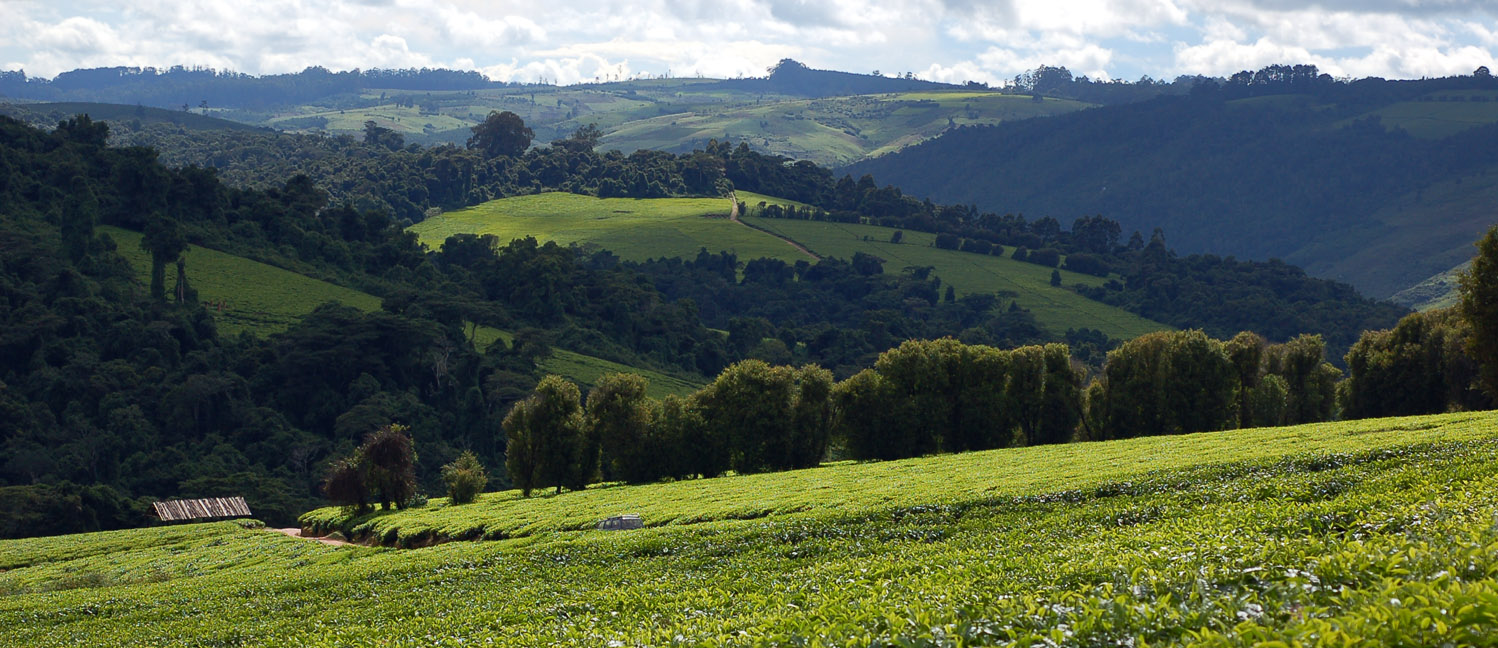
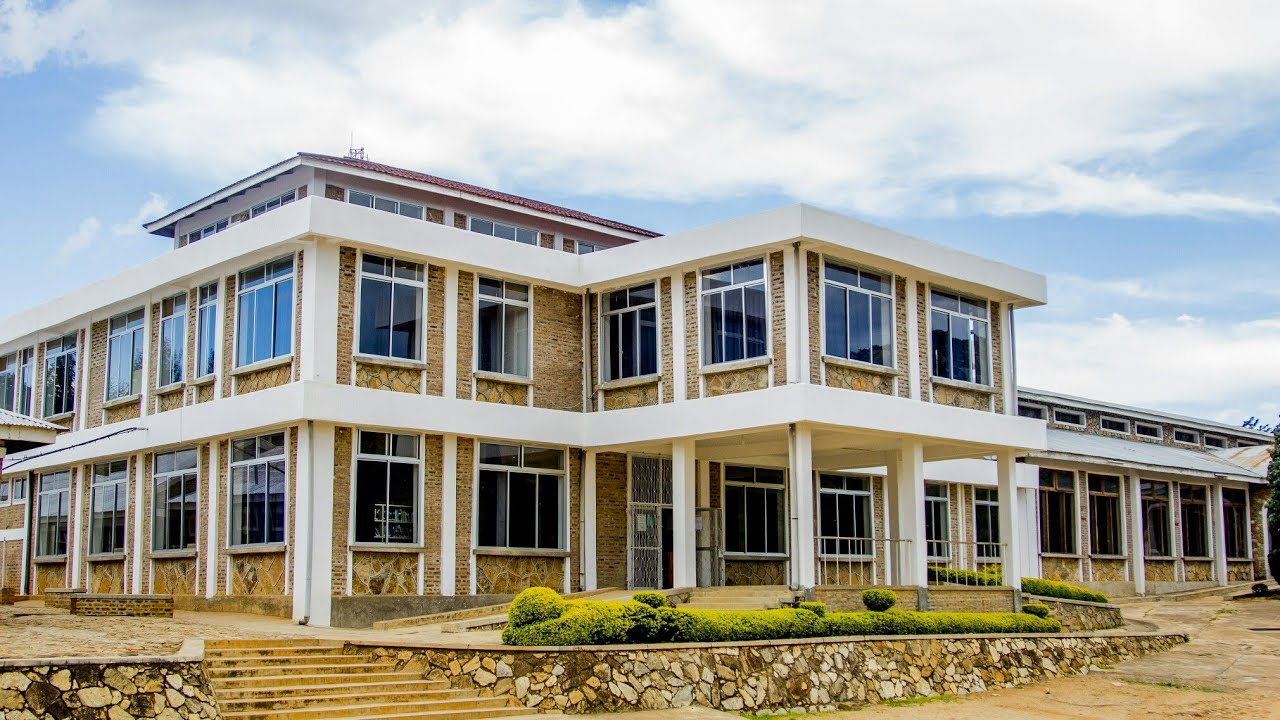
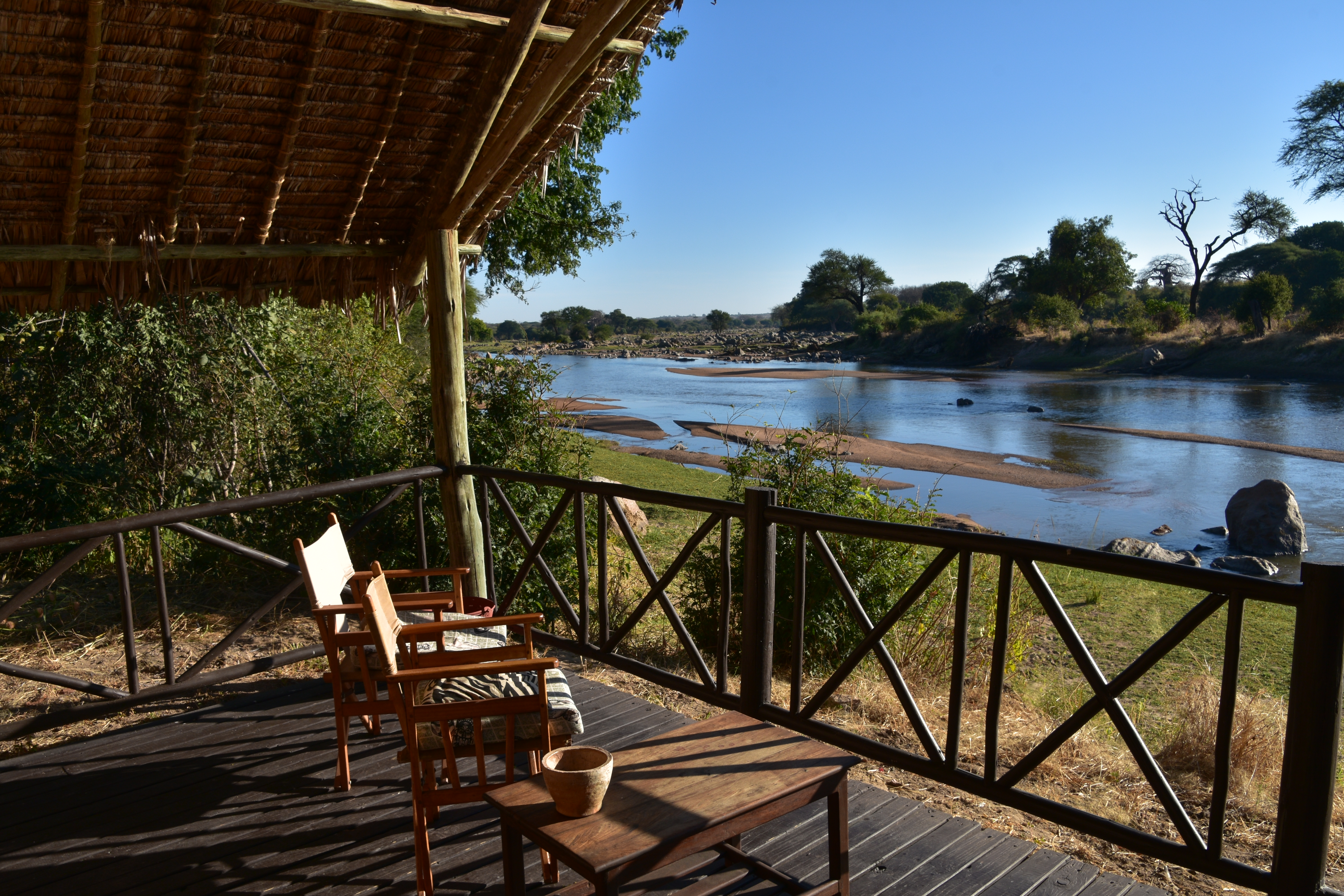
- From top to bottom: Great tea plantations landscapes of Mufindi District, The University of Iringa Library & Ruaha National Park in northern Iringa
- Nickname: Tanzania's Tea Cup
- Location in Tanzania
- Coordinates: 7°46′5.16″S 35°41′9.96″E
- Country: Tanzania
- Zone: Southern Highlands
- Administrative Region: 2012
- Named for: Iringa town
- Capital: Iringa
- Districts: List: Iringa Urban District; Iringa Rural District; Kilolo District; Mafinga District; Mufindi District

Government
  - Regional Commissioner: Halima Dendego

Area
  - Total: 35,503 km^{2} (13,708 sq mi)
  - Rank: 24th of 31
- Highest elevation (Luhombero): 2,489 m (8,166 ft)

Population (2022)
  - Total: 1,192,728
  - Rank: 12th of 31
  - Density: 33.595/km^{2} (87.011/sq mi)
- Demonym: Iringan

Ethnic groups
  - Settler: Swahili
  - Native: Hehe
- Time zone: UTC+3 (EAT)
- Postcode: 51xxx
- Area code: 026
- ISO 3166 code: TZ-04
- HDI (2021): 0.577 medium · 7th of 25
- Website: Official website
- Symbols of Tanzania
- Bird: Udzungwa forest partridge
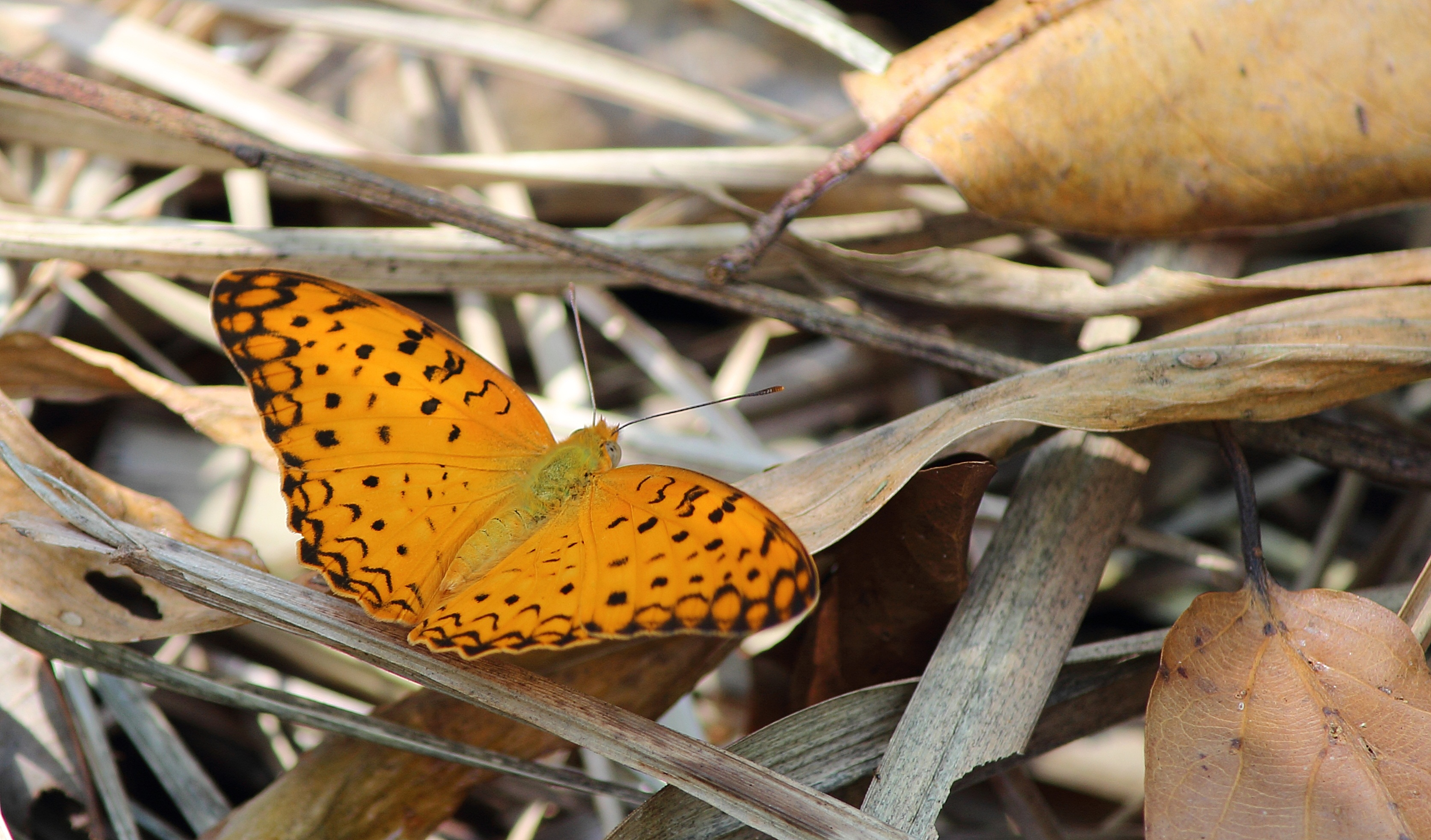
- Butterfly: Common leopard butterfly

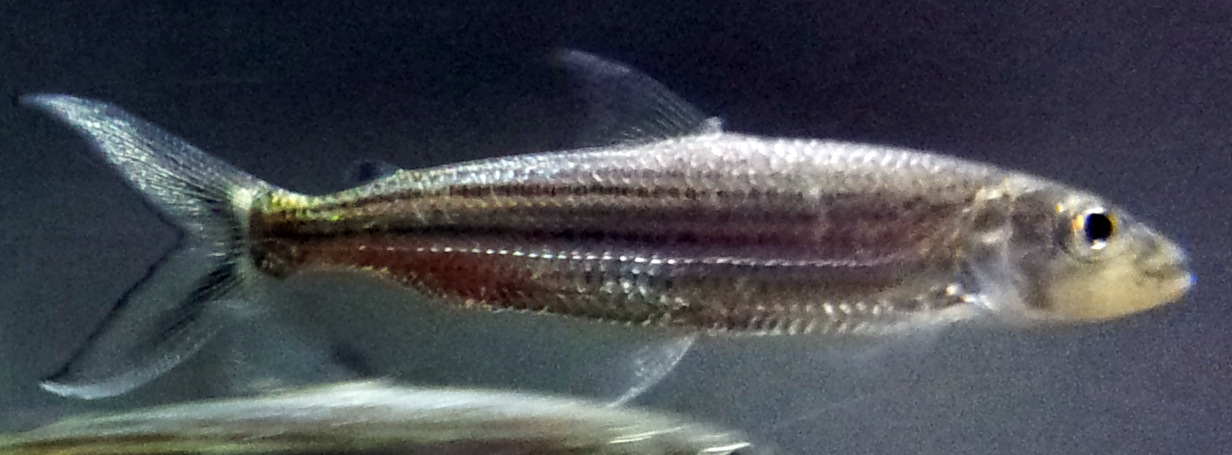
- Fish: Hydrocynus tanzaniae

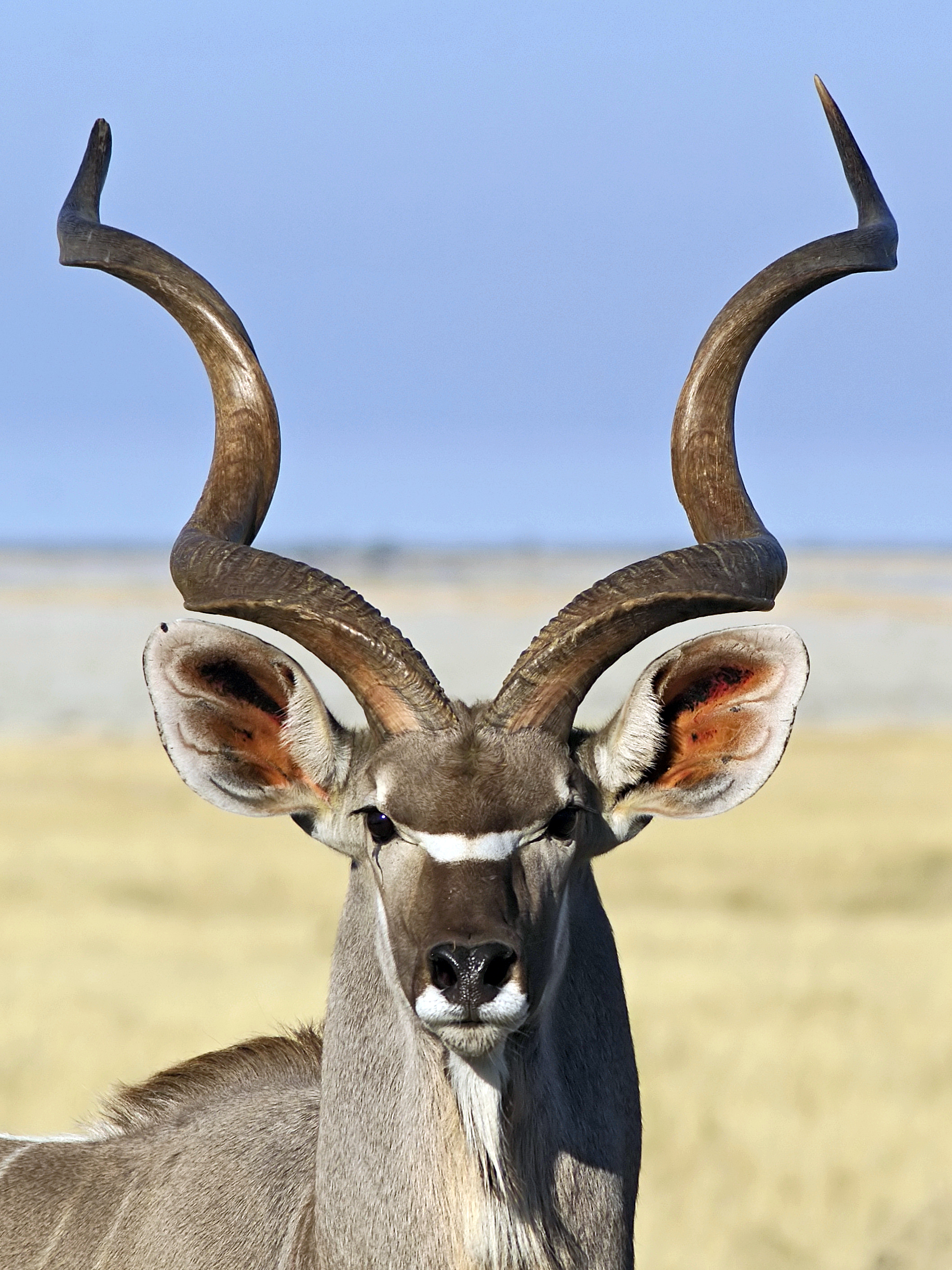
- Mammal: Greater Kudu

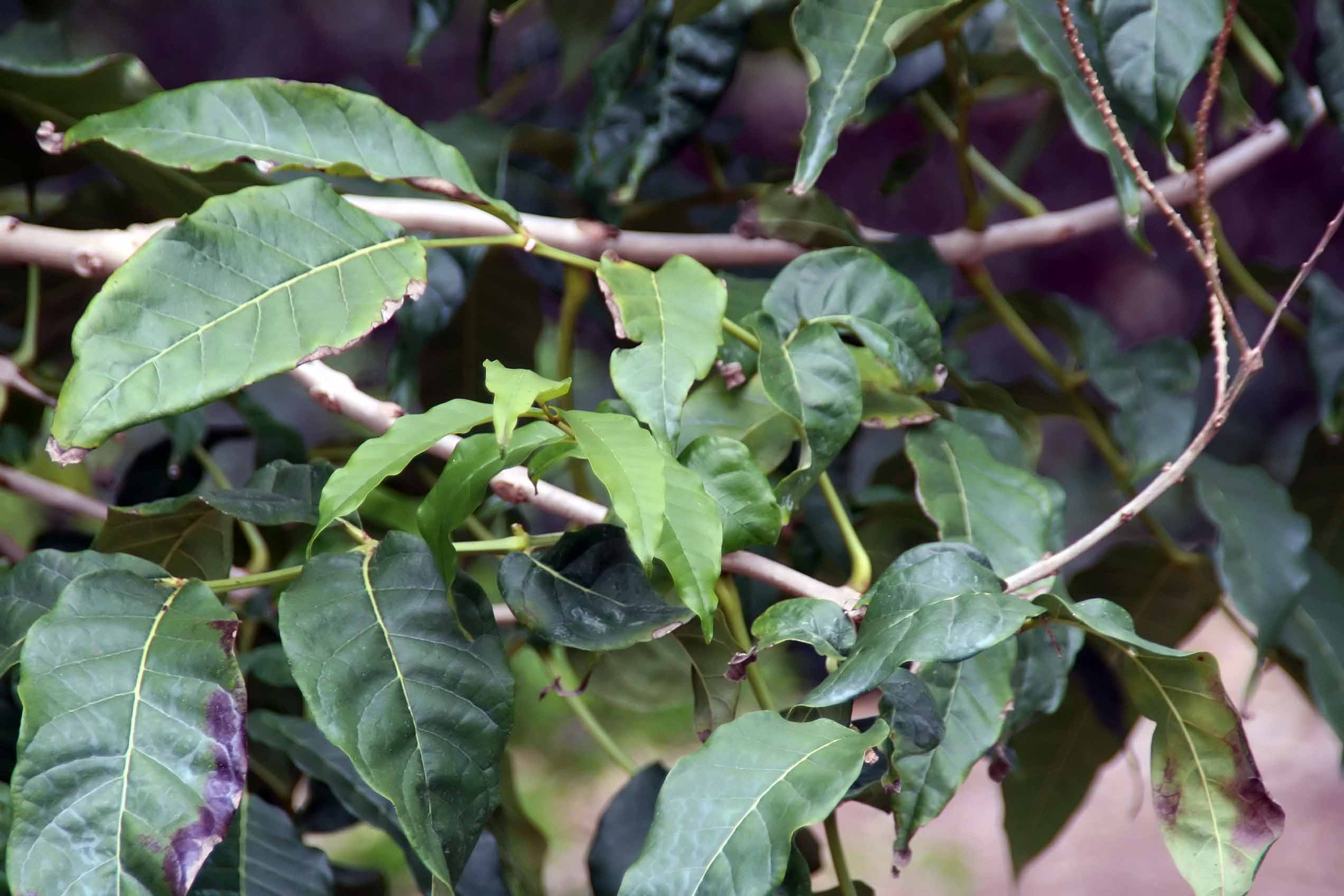
- Tree: Nile tulip

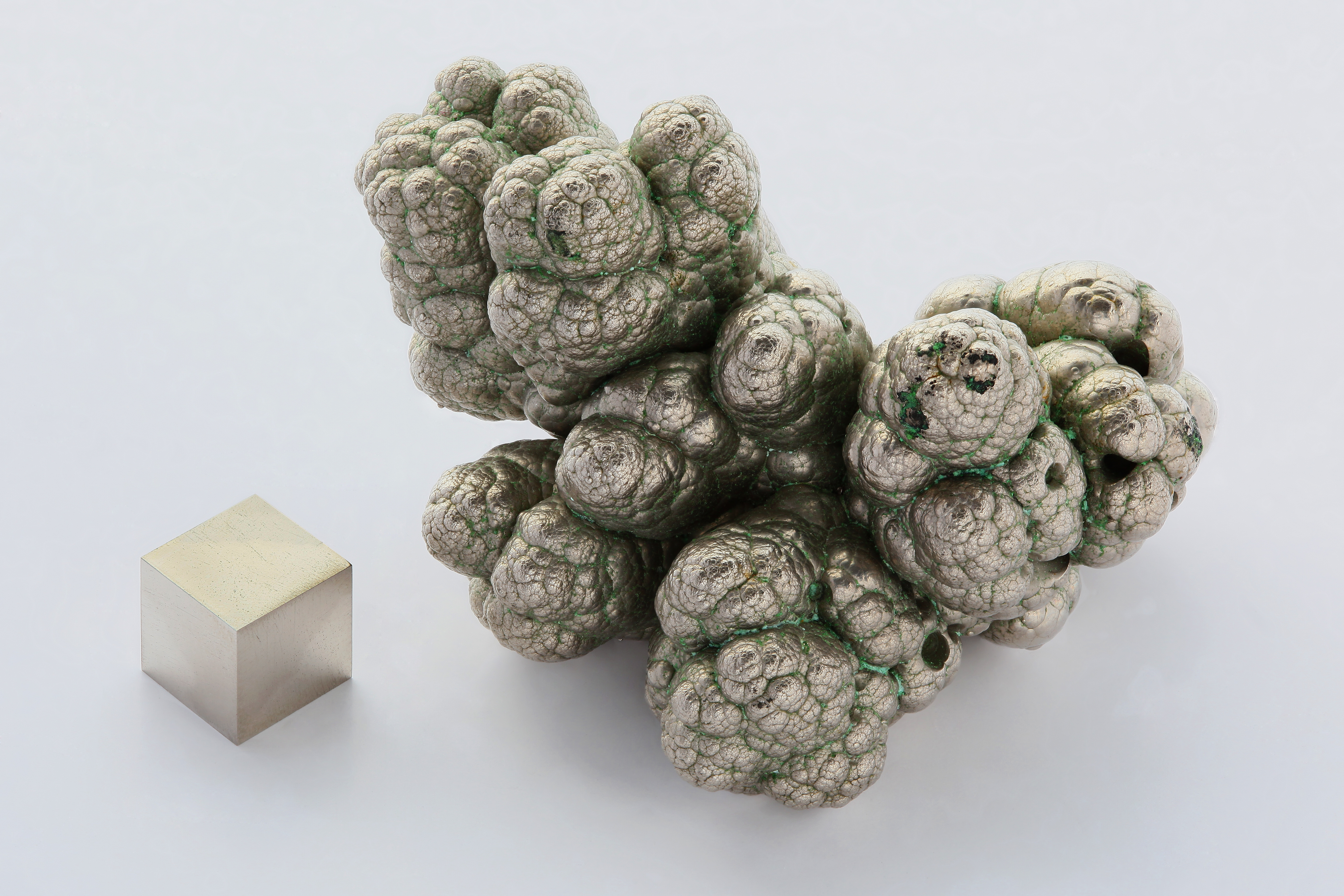
- Mineral: Nickel

Iringa Region (Swahili: Mkoa wa Iringa) is one of Tanzania's 31 administrative regions. The region covers an area of 35,503 km^{2} (13,708 sq mi). The region is comparable in size to the combined land area of the nation state of Guinea Bissau. Iringa Region is bordered to the east by Morogoro Region and south by Njombe Region. On the west the region is bordered by Mbeya Region. Dodoma Region and Singida Region border Iringa on the north. The regional capital is the city Iringa for which the city is named after. According to the 2022 census, the region has a total population of 1,192,728. Iringa Region is home to Ruaha National Park, Tanzania's second national largest park.

== Geography ==
The elevation of Iringa varies from 900 to 2,300 meters above sea level. A significant scarp that can reach 800 meters in height and is the eastern portion of the Great Rift Valley surrounds the area on all sides. Iringa is hence situated in Tanzania's southern highlands, bordering Mbeya, Njombe, Morogoro, Dodoma, and Singida areas.

The region is drained by the Little Ruaha and the Great Ruaha rivers. The lake created by the Mtera Dam is the other significant water body here.

The region can be divided into three zones - highland, midland and lowland. The highland zone is towards the east of the region. This area experiences a rainy season between November and May with annual precipitation ranging from 500–1,500 mm (20–59 in). The period between June and September is cold and dry. The midland zone, in the central part of the region, lies at a height of 1,200–1,600 m (3,900–5,200 ft) above sea level and faces between 600–1,000 mm (24–39 in) of rain every year. Finally, the lowland zone, at a height of 900–1,200 m (3,000–3,900 ft) gets between 500–600 mm (20–24 in) of rain per annum.

About 16% of the land in Iringa Region is forested. The region is host to the Ruaha National Park, famous for its large herd of elephants and over 400 species of birds. Other animals include lions, sable antelopes and kudu. A second park, Udzungwa Mountains National Park in Iringa Rural District, is less visited.

== Demographics ==
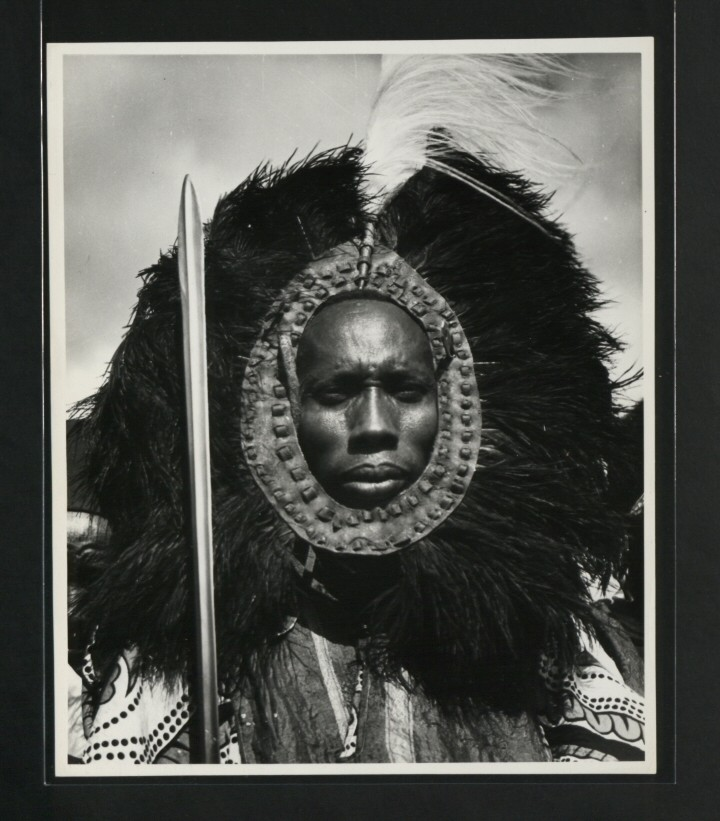
Hehe Warrior

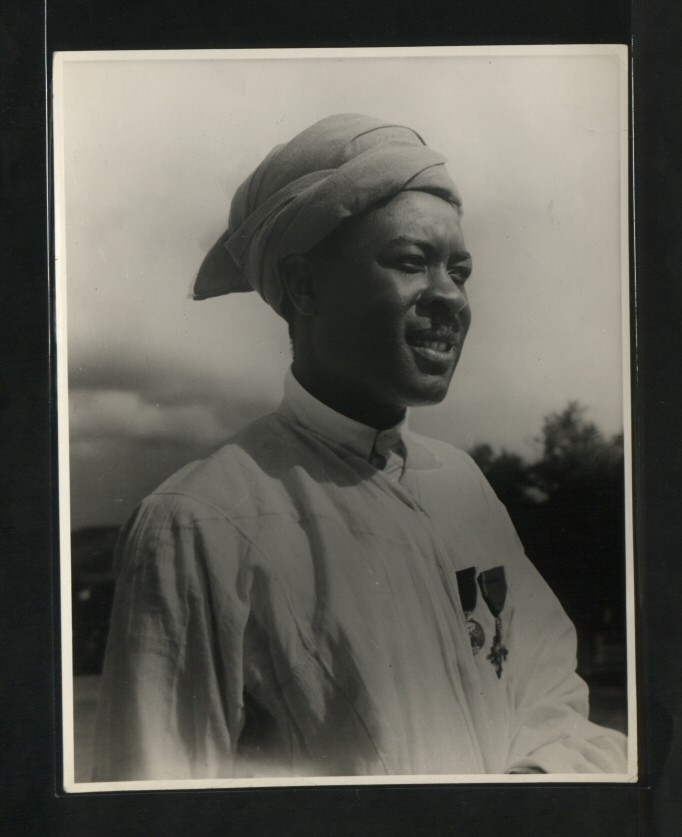
Adam Hapi, former Hehe King in the 1960s

Iringa Region has a total population of 1,192,728.

Hehe people are the largest ethnic group living in the region. Other major populations are those of Bena and Kinga groups. Pangwa, Chaga, Nyakyusa and Ngoni can be found in urban areas primarily engaged in business in the region. other immigrants into Iringa include Maasai and sukuma and groups are mostly engaged in pastoralism. The region has one of the lowest growing populations in Tanzania which is mainly attributed to persistent emigration from this region to more urban areas such as Dar es Salaam.

== Administrative divisions ==
=== Districts ===
Iringa Region is divided into three districts (Iringa, Kilolo and Mufindi), each administered by a council. The districts have local authorities operating under their supervision. These are three district councils, one municipal council, and one town council as listed in the table:

Districts of Iringa Region
District	Population (2012)
Iringa District	254,032
Kilolo District	218,130
Mufindi District	265,829
Iringa Municipal	151,345
Mafinga Town	51,902
Total	941,238

== Politics ==
Iringa Region elects seven representatives to the National Assembly of Tanzania. In the 2015 general election, six candidates from the ruling Chama Cha Mapinduzi and one from CHADEMA won their respective seats. William Lukuvi, the MP for Ismani is the Cabinet Minister for Lands, Housing and Human Settlements Development. Njombe Region was split off from Iringa in March 2012.

== Economy ==
Iringa Region has the fifth largest GDP out of the 30 regions in Tanzania. On a per-capita basis, Iringa's 2012 figure of about TSh 1,400,000 ranks it second only to Dar es Salaam Region which includes the capital of Tanzania.

Agriculture is the mainstay of Iringa's economy accounting for 85% of its GDP. Between 2008 and 2011, an average 345,000 hectares (1,330 mi^{2}) of land was planted with food crops annually. Maize is the dominant cereal with about 245,000 hectares (950 mi^{2}) of land devoted to it. Beans are second most important food crop being grown on 56,000 hectares (220 mi^{2}). Cash crops take about 56,000.00 hectares with sunflower being the major output.

The industry in Iringa Region is mostly small scaled and largely located in the Iringa municipality. The food industry consists of tomatoes and chili processing, milk processing, grain milling. There is also carpentry and oil processing which comprise the bulk of industrial units found within the Iringa Region.

== Notable people ==
- Geline Fuko, Lawyer and Human Rights Defender
- Ray C, musician
