= Lindi Bay =

Bay of Lindi Region

Coordinates: 9°57′S 39°45′E

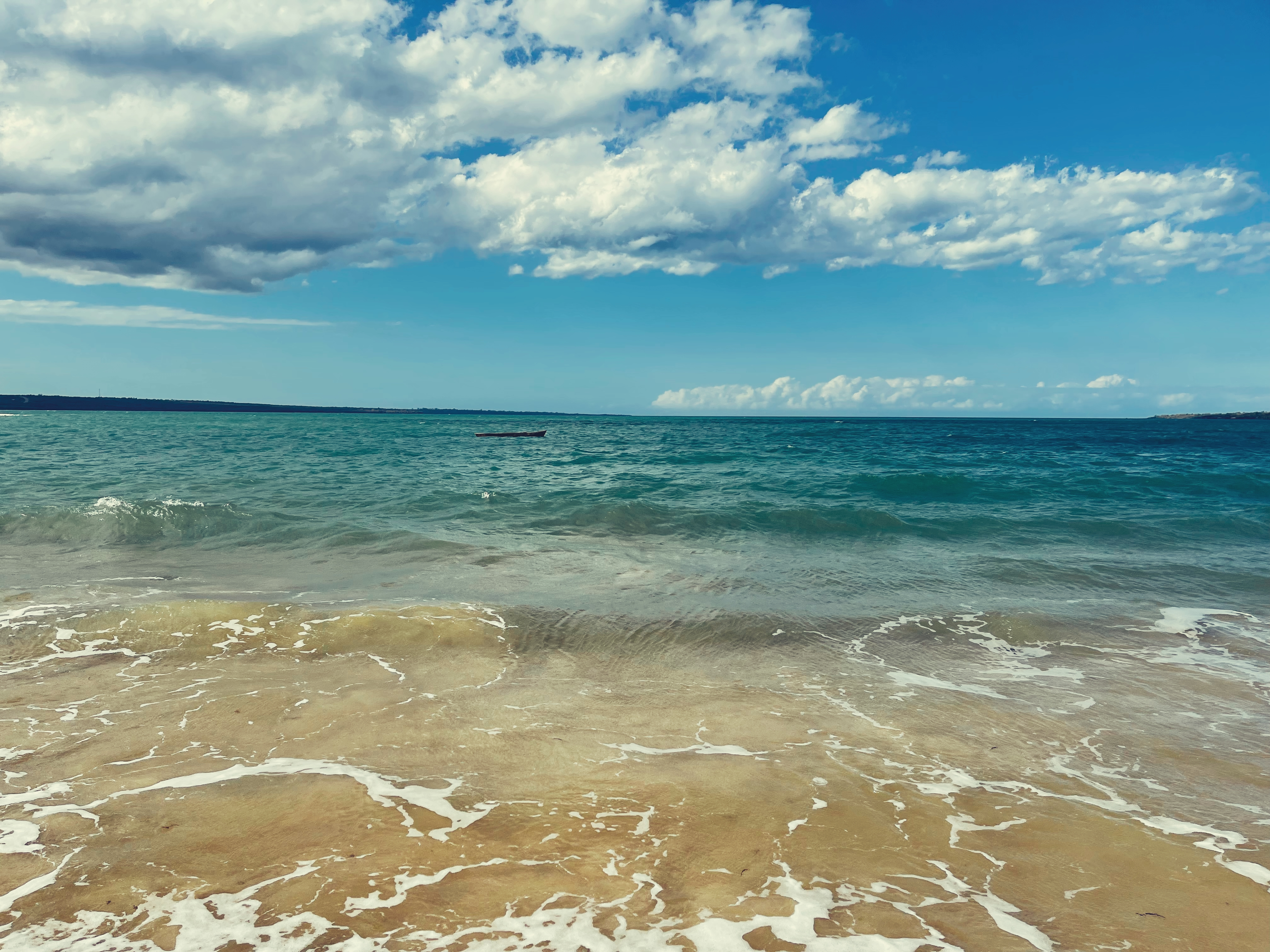
Lindi Bay

Lindi Bay (Swahili language: Ghuba la Lindi) is a body of water in located in southern Lindi Region in south east Tanzania. Located in the Indian Ocean, the bay is 11.8km long, 5.9km at its widest and 750m at its shortest. The bay is fed by the Lukuledi River with the mouth of the river into the bay is located the town of Lindi, which is the regional capital of the Lindi region. The bay does not have a shipping port, however, most of the marine vessels are the Lindi Ferry and dugout canoes used by the resident fishermen. The original inhabitants of the bay are the Mwera people.
