= Cashew production in Tanzania =

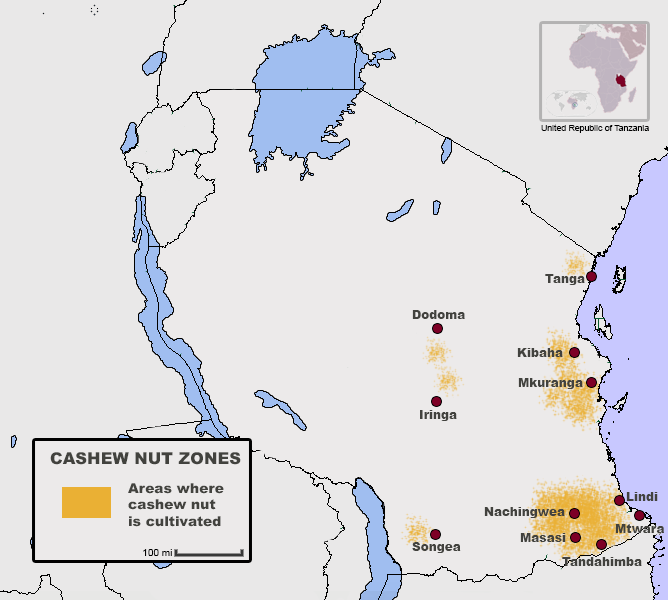
Map showing the 11 locations where cashew nuts are grown in Tanzania.

Tanzania is one of the largest cashew producers in Africa, with exports providing 10–15 percent of the country's foreign exchange. The country is the eighth-largest grower of cashew nut in the world and ranks fourth in Africa. The country provides 20% of Africa's cashew nut and only trails in production of Nigeria, Cote D'Ivoire, and Guinea-Bissau, according to figures released in 2012 by United Nations Food and Agricultural Organisation (FAO). The country has been engaged in the production of the cash crop since before independence in the years 1960s however, poor regulation and lack of reliable payments to farmers have posed significant challenges to the Cashew Nut farming industry in Tanzania. Guinea-Bissau, a country a tenth of the area of Tanzania's, has a significantly greater yield.

The cash crop is usually cultivated in the southern coastal regions of the country, near the towns of Mtwara, Kilwa and Dar es Salaam. The sale and marketing of the product is run by the Cashewnut Board of Tanzania, through various farmer co-operatives. More than ninety percent of the exports are destined for India and almost entirely in raw form. The lack of domestic processing firms costs the country vital foreign revenues and thousands of jobs. The Tanzanian government has been facing challenges for finding potential investors in order to revive the cashew processing industry in Tanzania.

== History ==
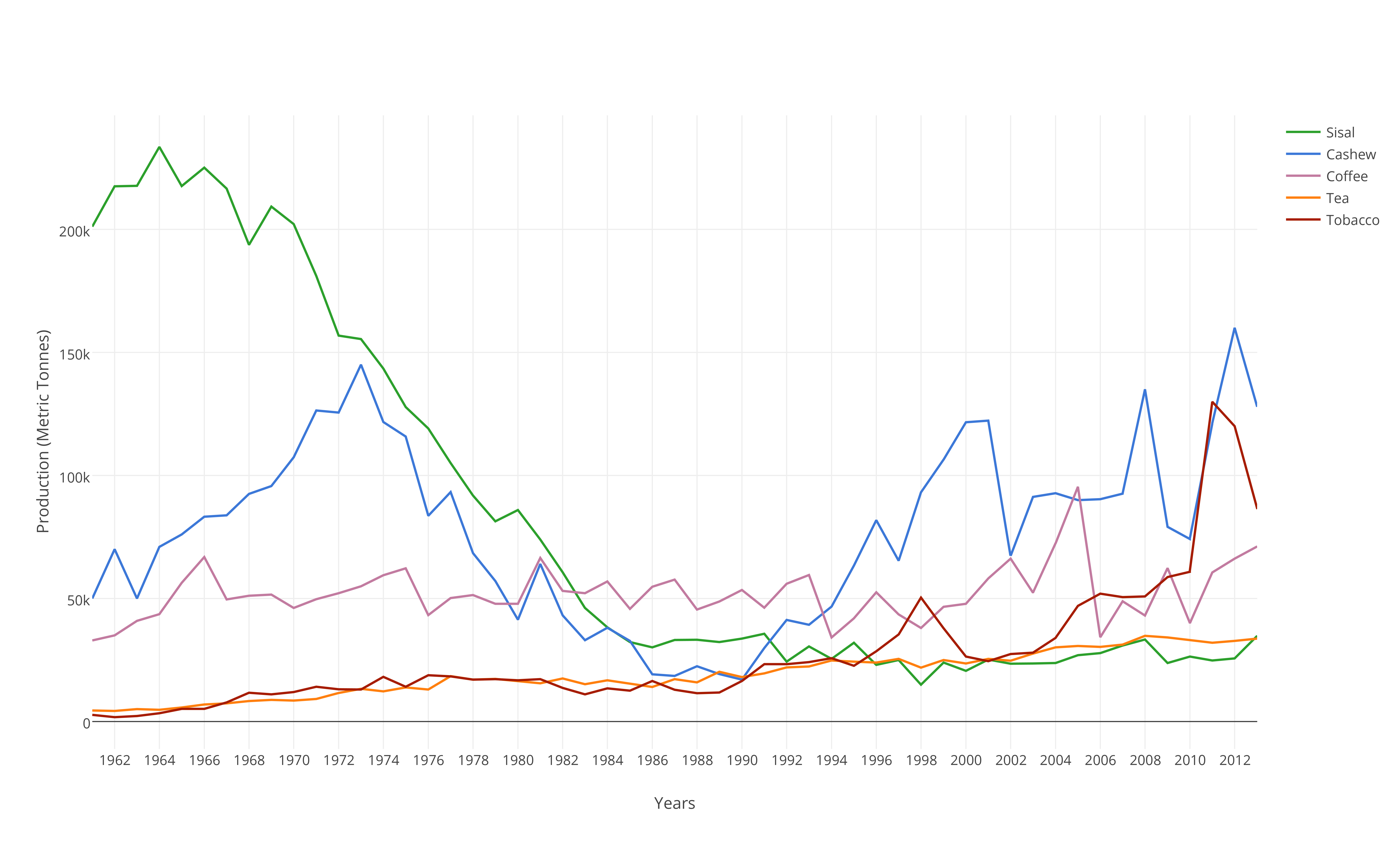
Historical national output of cash crops in Tanzania: Blue-Cashewnuts.

Cashew nuts have been grown on a commercial scale in the country since the 1950s. Due to developing infrastructure and lack of jobs in the southern region, cashew cultivation was highly favored. The zone was also previously used as part of the failed Tanganyika Groundnut scheme. The industry's production peaked in 1973, when the total output exceeded to a record breaking 145,000 tonnes.

The industry almost collapsed in the 1980s. Annual production had dropped as low as 20,000 tonnes in 1986. This was largely due to various government interventions in the harvest and marketing processes. The Ujamaa program saw a shift in agriculture from cash crops to alternative crops. Furthermore, mass relocation of people and the collectivization of villages during the 1980s resulted in many farmers abandoning large real estates and areas of the crop production. The nationalization of cashew nut processing factories also contributed to the serious challenges of the industry as these governmental institutions were new and faced a steep learning curve in this respective industry.

Economic reforms began to take place after this near collapse with the goal of reviving the troubled industry. There has been a remarkable recovery since then. In just 10 years from 1990 to 1999, cashew nut production went from approximately 29,000 tonnes to 120,000 tonnes. This brought in over $US 100 million dollars to the treasury and sparked national interest in further expansion of the industry. The growth was achieved due to increased trade liberalization and sector reforms aimed at abolishing the state monopoly. Furthermore, previous laws enacted by the government that prevented the export of raw nuts were reversed and this action brought much-needed ancillary revenue to the farmers. The falling Tanzanian shilling against the dollar fueled the export industry further and new private sector investments increased the revenue earned by the farmers. Farmers also began to be paid on time and increased significant output as this was the major barrier that deterred small farmers previously.

== Plantation ==
More than eighty-five percent of the farmers are small holder farmers and have an average farm size of 1 hectare. Most farmers are the elderly and rely on manual labour rather than machinery. Most youth from the rural areas prefer to move to the urban areas as cashew farming is less appealing to them. The lack of new blood and new investment in the farms have caused the trees to age and the trees in most locations are very old and have been reducing in yield over the years.

== Location of Plantations ==
The Tanzania Cashew nut Industry has seven locations. Below list as follows;

1. Dodoma. smaller estates and farms
2. Iringa smaller estates and farms
3. Lindi (18%) farms
4. Mtwara contributing 70% of the national output in 2011 is one of the main producer located in the southern part of the country.
5. Pwani (8%) farms
6. Ruvuma (4%) smaller estates and farms
7. Tanga (1%) smaller estates and farms

Tanzania has a competitive advantage on the global market, however, the country faces challenges to capitalize on this resource. The harvest time for Tanzanian and Mozambique cashews are in the off season for cashews from India and West Africa and therefore is sold when the market prices are higher. Furthermore, Tanzania has one of the largest sized nuts and has a very high natural yield per hectare. In 2010 an average farm produced over 1 tonne per hectare.

=== Grading ===
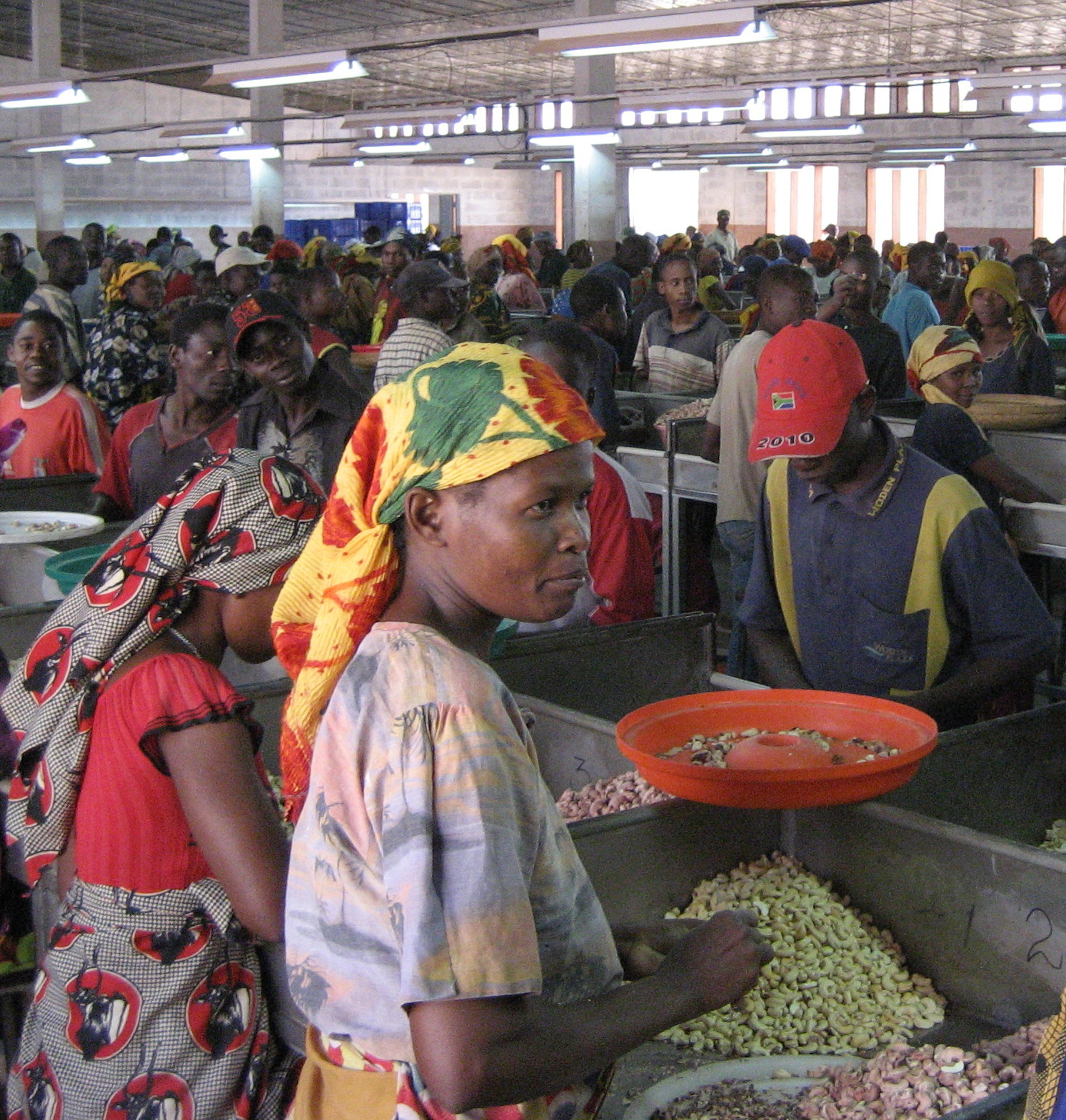
Cashew nut industry personal in action in the North of Mozambique sorting the cash crop similar to Tanzania.

Grading the cash crop has been an unnecessary debate that has been challenging the industry. Before the liberalization of the industry in 1994, grading of the nuts was done in the villages that sorted the nuts into three categories; “standard”, “under” and “rejects”. However, after liberalization grading was not mandatory and due to the farmers urgency to cash out on the harvest it was often avoided. This caused the revenue per tonne for the farmers to drop consistently as exporters were unaware of the quality. The absence of sorting causes many problems for the industry. One being that unsorted nuts increase transport costs and accelerate the contamination of good nuts as they are mixed together with bad nuts. The absence of sorting also deprives local women jobs who used to get paid to sort the nuts and discourages the farmers from producing high-quality nuts as they get paid the same amount regardless of quality. There has been major debate to reform this system, either by reinstating the previous system or to implement a similar system as the coffee board of Tanzania and have quality checks before the nuts are auctioned.

=== Processing ===
Over 90% of the national harvest is exported to India for processing. Recently Vietnam also began the purchase of Tanzanian cashew crops however the value was only around 3,000 tonnes in 2001. Currently the country has 4 major cashew processors as follows in the numerical list below;

1. Hawte ( Mtwara | 200 tons / year ) [11]
2. Korosho Africa (Tunduru, Newala and Mtwara | 2500 ton/year)[12]
3. Mohammed Enterprises (Dar es Salaam | 2000 ton/year)
4. Olam Tanzania Limited. (Mtwara | 500 ton/year)

These four processors do not come close to the national output and there has been government interest to revive and open new processing plants. In July 2014, ex-Tanzanian Prime minister Mizengo Pinda, declared that the government was going to spend $US 72 million and revive four processing plants in the south. Plants set for revival are located in Newala, Masasi, Lindi and Nachingwea. The new plants will increase the countries processing capacity by 29,500 tonnes.

== Statistics ==
Export of Tanzanian cashew nuts by country
1. India (83.0%)
2. United States (5.00%)
3. United Arab Emirates (4.00%)
4. Kenya (2.00%)
5. Other (6.00%)

Tanzanian Cashew nut production was first cultivated in the 1950s and the agricultural output peaked in 1972. However, the country has never attained an equivalent output since then it seems it is recovering at a rapid pace. Below are some production statistics from 2005 to 2011.

Production and exports of cashew nuts in Tanzania
		2005	2006	2007	2008	2009	2010	2011
Production		71,918	77,446	92,573	99,106	76,068	75,366	121,135
Exports		70,667	66,708	69,259	75,888	64,335	63,044	113,374
% of exported production		98%	86%	75%	77%	85%	84%	94%
FOB unit values and volumes for cashew nuts exports in Tanzania
		2005	2006	2007	2008	2009	2010	2011
Cashew nuts in shell	Volume (tonne)	50,598	55,065	58,861	52,747	95,597	102,707	198,851
Cashew nuts in shell	Unit value (USD/tonne)	790	670	679	813	715	960	1063
Cashew nuts shelled	Volume (tonne)	1,741	3,825	5,983	7,726	4,940	30,207	34,315
Cashew nuts shelled	Unit value (USD/tonne)	3,764	3,893	3,719	3,431	4,482	879	1,018
Source: MAFAP-SPAAA

== See also ==
- Coffee production in Tanzania
- Mtwara Port
- Economy of Tanzania
