= Donald Lovett =

British military officer

Dr Donald Lovett, OBE (1918-7 July 2018) was Principal Medical Officer for Wales, retiring in 1983.

He qualified in medicine at the Welsh National School of Medicine in 1942 and served in the Royal Army Medical Corps in Nigeria, Kenya and Somaliland. After the war he took a Diploma of Public Health and joined the Colonial Medical Service in Somaliland where he was involved in planning and building a new hospital at Hargeisa and organising a relapsing fever eradication campaign. He was promoted to Senior Medical Officer in Mtwara, Tanganyika in 1957 and shortly after moved to Arusha. He was promoted to Assistant Director of Medical Services in Dar es Salaam in 1959 where he facilitated the transition to independence with Africanisation of the medical administration, and remained after independence until 1963.

In 1964 he joined the Welsh Hospital Board as Assistant Senior Administrative Medical officer. He continued to advice the Colonial Office and then the Ministry of Overseas Development in Guyana in 1965 and in the Northern Trucial States in 1969.
