= Mikindani =

National Historic Site of Tanzania

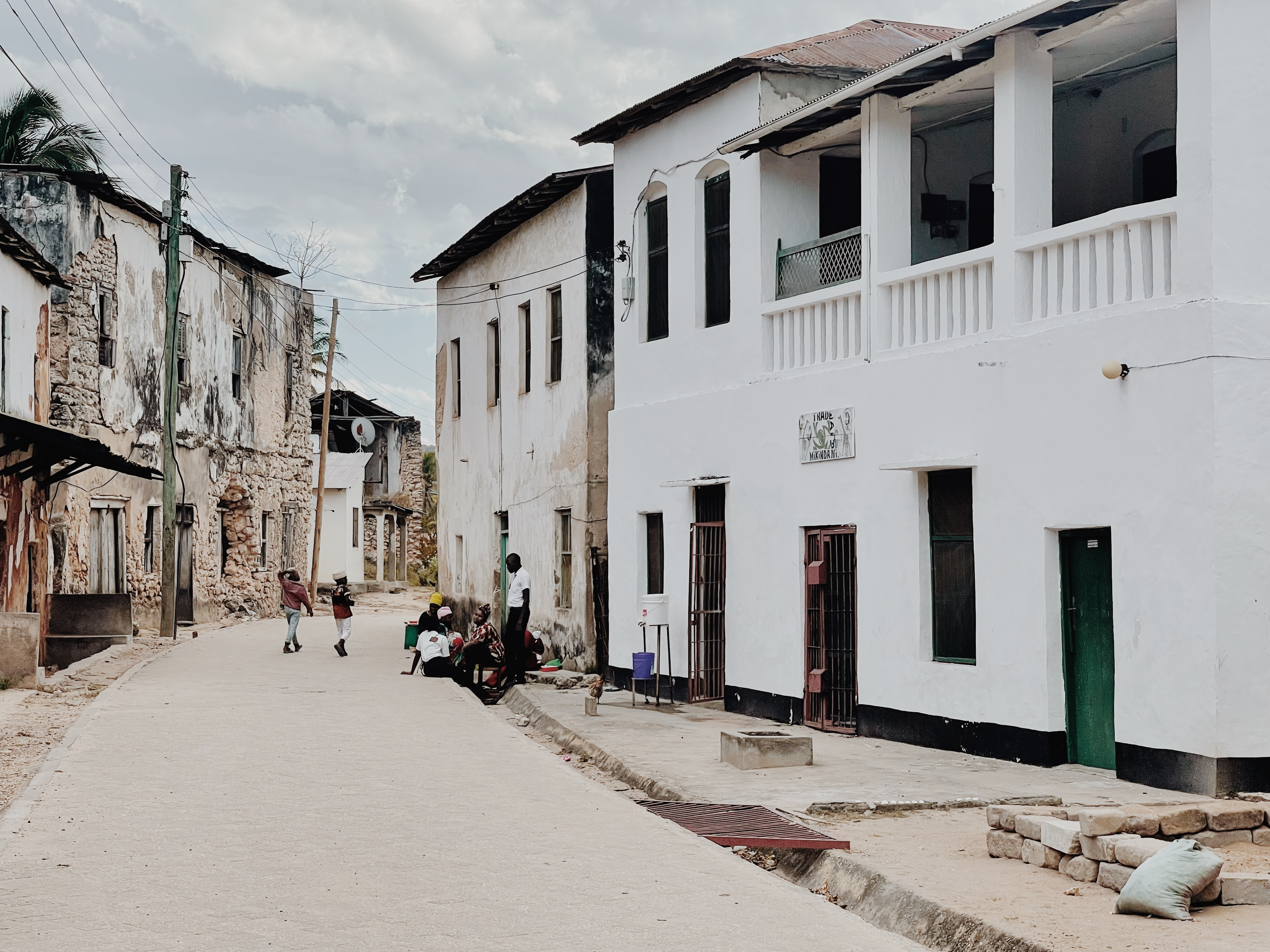
- Street Scene in Mikindani Historic Town

- Location within Tanzania
- 10°16′54.12″S 40°7′4.08″E
- Type: Settlement
- Cultures: Swahili
- Location: Mtwara-Mikindani District, Mtwara Region, Tanzania

History
- Built: 9th century CE

Site notes
- Material: Coral rag
- Elevation: 10 m (33 ft)
- Architectural styles: Swahili & Islamic
- Condition: Endangered
- Owner: Tanzanian Government
- Management: Antiquities Division, Ministry of Natural Resources and Tourism

National Historic Sites of Tanzania
- Official name: Mikndani Historic Town
- Type: Cultural

Mikindani (Mji wa kale wa Mikindani in Swahili) is a historic coastal town located in Mtwara-Mikindani District of Mtwara Region in Tanzania. The name comes from the Swahili word mikinda which means "young coconut trees". Therefore, the term "Mikindani', literally means "the place where there are young coconut trees" in old Swahili language. Mikindani is part of the city of Mtwara and is governed by the Mtwara Mikindani Municipal Council. The site is a registered National Historic Site.

== Overview ==
About 50 kilometres north of the Mozambique border, in the Tanzanian Mtwara Region, is the location of settlement of Mikindani. Mikindani was a thriving port in the 19th century, when it participated in the trades of ivory, gum copal, and slaves for the Indian Ocean plantation system. It served as the starting point for Dr. David Livingstone's final expedition into the interior of Africa in 1866 during that time period. Kilwa, a significant Swahili city, has been the subject of archaeological studies in the area surrounding Mikindani. Mikindani participated in Indian Ocean trade during the first millennium CE, used marine resources with mixed farming subsistence practises, and extensively shared coastal trends.

However, as the millennium went on, Mikindani's material culture and economy set itself apart from that of northern coastal settlements. They did not follow Swahili patterns of historical development during the second millennium, which was strikingly evident in the absence of distinctive Indian Ocean import ceramics and the emergence of a new local ceramics style with ties to the interior and the south rather than Swahili sites further north. By the middle of the second millennium, when the town reintegrated with the Indian Ocean world, these differences from the rest of the Swahili coast were partially erased. However, the significance of interior linkages was still retained, as demonstrated by surviving material culture parallels.

== History ==
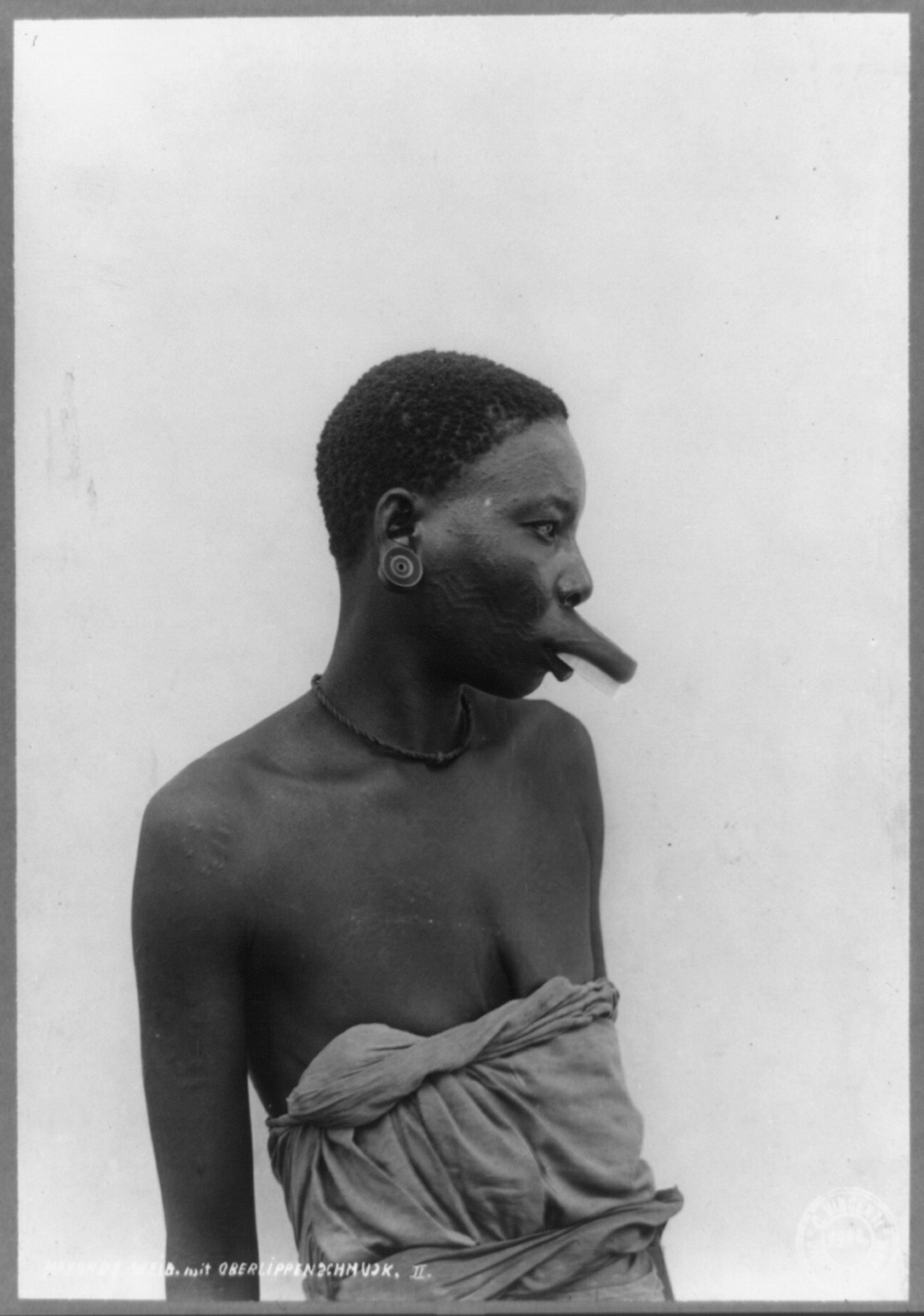
Makonde woman in Mikindani late 19th Century.

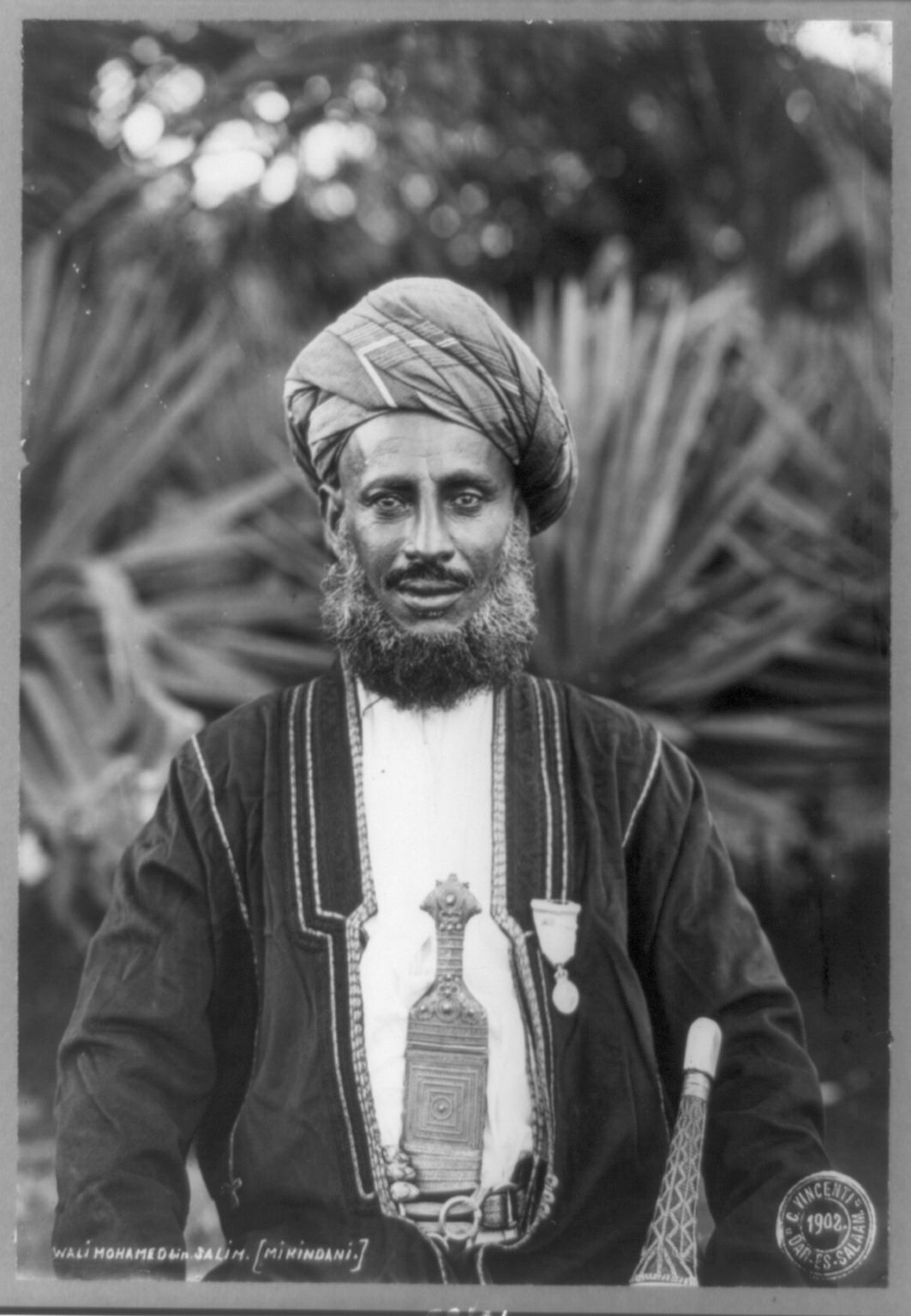
Mohamed bin Salim, the Liwali of Mikindani, photographed in 1902.

The settlement of Mikindani is first mentioned in written history in the latter half of the eighteenth century in relation to French involvement in the slave trade, although several of these early records, such as one from David Livingstone in 1866, offer architectural evidence for a much longer habitation. In fact, archaeological study in the area surrounding Mikindani has shown that there has been intensive habitation since the fifth century and that there has been occupation since the final centuries BCE. The original inhabitants were the Makonde people

In comparison to other Swahili towns and cities, Makonde communities such as those in Mikindani were modest in size. They struck a balance between a matrilineally organised ritual authority for the offspring of early settlers and founders and a strong ambivalence towards authority and a propensity to disintegrate through small-scale movements in response to problems like drought and raiding, to acquire new land to support extensive agricultural patterns of bush fallowing, or out of simple ambition. Due to these traits, Makonde communities were able to survive on their own in spite of Portuguese pacification efforts, slave raids, and the actions of many African war leaders.

Mikindani is situated in the Swahili Coast, a cultural area spanning from Mozambique to Somalia. It is situated 250 kilometres south of Kilwa, a significant Swahili city, at the southernmost point of that coast. Iron Age fishing and agricultural communities gradually became more integrated into the social and economic networks of the Indian Ocean in the second part of the first millennium. This transformation was sparked by the conversion of many coastal populations to Islam.

=== 11th Century to 16th Century ===
Early in the second millennium, stone-built urban centres grew in number and a common, cosmopolitan material culture that mixed Islamic and Middle Eastern elements with African ones gave rise to a florescence of Swahili culture. During this time, Swahili towns maintained their independence and competitiveness while interacting with Indian Ocean traders, following various forms of Islam, and maintaining connections to the various African groups that made up their respective hinterlands. Even though Swahili people have continuously fought, cooperated with, and been ruled by colonial forces from Europe and the Oman since the sixteenth century, they have managed to preserve their own cultural identity.

At Mikindani, the early second millennium marks a clear break from the centuries before it. This second phase is mostly a reorientation of Mikindani's exterior linkages away from the sphere of the Indian Ocean and towards the interior Rovuma River basin. The absence of any imported ceramics—which had become more prevalent elsewhere on the Swahili coast—from the archaeological record in the Mikindani region at this time is arguably the most noticeable feature. Even though tens of thousands of pieces of locally made pottery were found, none of the imported celadon, sgraffito, black-on-yellow, Islamic monochrome, Chinese stoneware, or other types of pottery were found.

Local pottery provide evidence for how the area thrived despite its residents' withdrawal from trade with the Indian Ocean; they relied on connections with interior communities. The pottery types made in the Mikindani region at the beginning of the second millennium were distinct from those made there in centuries prior as well as from those being developed further north at other Swahili sites along the coast. They are distinguished by thin-walled, well-fired open bowls and necked vessels with flattened, tapered rims and significant areal stamping or shell-edge impressions on their exteriors. In terms of decoration, vessel form, rim type, and production method, these varieties are similar to the Mwamasapa tradition made in northern Malawi and the Lumbo tradition made in northern Mozambique.

The archaeological record thus documents a change in cultural and economic ties when Mikindani's residents turned their focus inward rather than towards the Indian Ocean sphere. It is possible to propose a number of explanations for why that change took place. The development of Kilwa as a significant commercial and political hub would have been one crucial factor. That Swahili city was well known for controlling access to trade and imported products even inside its own province, and it even claimed some degree of authority over the southern Tanzanian coast.

Second, given that Mikindani appears to have embraced Islam relatively late, rising cultural disparities are likely to have made the economically precarious situation that Mikindani held in the Indian Ocean worse. However, Mikindani's residents may have benefited from additional trade options along the Rovuma River even as their opportunities to take part in Indian Ocean trade grew increasingly limited. The similarities in culture that the local ceramics revealed linked Mikindani to the places that the Makonde's oral traditions identified as their ancestral homelands.

Second, given that Mikindani appears to have embraced Islam relatively late, rising cultural disparities are likely to have made the economically precarious situation that Mikindani held in the Indian Ocean worse. However, Mikindani's residents may have benefited from additional trade options along the Rovuma River even as their opportunities to take part in Indian Ocean trade grew increasingly limited. The similarities in culture that the local ceramics revealed linked Mikindani to the places that the Makonde's oral traditions identified as their ancestral homelands.

While most Tanzanian accounts place the Makonde's origin in an ill-defined area of northern Mozambique known as Ndonde before crossing the river, the ethnographer Jorge Dias' account of their history in Mozambique suggests that they began along the shores of Lake Malawi and then followed the Rovuma coastward. Given the range of Makonde group movements in southern Tanzania since the middle of the eighteenth century that have been historically documented, it is important to remember that the archaeological record should not be interpreted as confirming these oral stories.

However, when combined, these two datasets do indicate that Mikindani's residents, who faced dwindling opportunities in Indian Ocean trade, instead established significant cultural and economic ties with dispersed, expanding, non-Swahili communities in the interior throughout the early second millennium.

The people of Mikindani gradually started to reintegrate into the Indian Ocean region starting in the sixteenth century. They started buying imported ceramics, such as Chinese blue-on-white porcelain and different knockoffs made overseas. Imports were primarily limited to the communities around Mikindani Bay, which for the first time encompassed the permanent habitation of the majority of Mikindani's town. From such contexts, common Swahili Ware pottery were also found, particularly open bowls painted red and those with bands of punctate ornamentation on the neck. Ruined mosques are further evidence that at least some of the local inhabitants had converted to Islam. All of these traits imply that the people of Mikindani were once more a part of Swahili social, economic, and cultural life as well as Indian Ocean networks. Notably, this development took place as Kilwa's authority and influence were waning.

This is probably a result of efforts to uphold and preserve the crucial social, cultural, and economic networks that link the area to interior non-Swahili populations. It might also be the outcome of ongoing rivalry and unpredictability around Mikindani's position in Indian Ocean trade. While Kilwa's fall brought about previously unattainable opportunities, it also left a void in southern Tanzania that neighbouring Swahili centres hastened to fill. In fact, the power vacuum sparked rivalry that persisted into the nineteenth century between Mombasa, Zanzibar, the restored Kilwa polity, and others.

=== 18th and 19th Century ===
The Omani Sultanate's consolidation of authority was arguably one of the most significant developments along the Swahili coast in the late eighteenth and early nineteenth century. Since the middle of the eighteenth century, the Omanis have actively participated in coastal politics, first joining forces with different Swahili communities to fight the Portuguese and later pursuing their own colonial ambitions. As a result, throughout the eighteenth and nineteenth centuries, Omani sovereignty was extended to a number of Swahili cities, most notably Mombasa and Zanzibar. The last time the Omani Bu'Saidi Sultanate defeated Kilwa's "embattled independence" was in 1785, according to southern Tanzania. Omani colonialism was neither uniform nor unwavering at the same time.

The Mazrui liwali of Mombasa, who were also Omani, declared independence from Oman after the Bu'Saidi dynasty succeeded the Ya'rubi sultanate in Oman. From that point on, they pursued a distinct coastal agenda until they were finally overthrown by the Bu'Saidi in 1837. The port town of Sudi, which is twenty kilometres from Mikindani, had stronger relations to Mombasa in the late eighteenth century, but the majority of the evidence points to Mikindani's association with the Bu'Saidi seat in Zanzibar. Naturally, the colonial tactics used by the Omanis, whether Bu'Saidi or Mazrui, led to this exact mistake. This tactic, which mostly left local authority institutions in place and avoided direct control in favour of a scheme of nominal sovereignty and customs taxes, was intended to sustain brisk and profitable trade throughout the Indian Ocean. The Mikindani region appears to have followed a similar path, as European authors noted that the Sultan was unable to assert his authority without the "cordial cooperation" of the Swahili and Makonde populace.

The Omani sultanate was ultimately confronted with the flaws in their strategy as British and German power grew in the nineteenth century. While they were forced to comply with European expectations, they were also unable to do so without endangering their relationship with their Swahili "subjects." In particular, the British compelled the Zanzibari sultanate to sign anti-slavery accords and later served as the agreements' de facto enforcers, foreshadowing the Protectorate system that would take place at the end of the nineteenth century.

Prior to the Moresby Treaty of 1822, the Omanis assisted in facilitating the slave trade, which was so important for Mikindani's own expansion. They also started Pemba Island and Zanzibar's clove plantations, the first prosperous, extensive, exploitative colonial operation on the coast. In doing so, they expropriated local people and reimagined the relationship between the owner and the slave, establishing a model for commercial agriculture that was later replicated all along the coast, albeit with other crops. The development of rubber plantations in the hinterland of Mikindani appears to have followed a similar pattern.

In the late eighteenth century, Mikindani had tremendous growth, and in the nineteenth century, when it participated in the commerce in ivory and gum copal as well as the purchase of enslaved people for the Indian Ocean plantation system, it was a profitable port. Its peak occurred later than most Swahili cities because of this, but it was nonetheless a port community like Bagamoyo and Kilwa Kivinje that also benefited from shifting trade patterns in the Indian Ocean. Although it happened quite late, Mikindani's expansion and wealth are nevertheless relatively well-known, at least for a town of its clearly average size.

Mikindani town is documented in European sources from the later eighteenth century, its oral tradition was recorded in the nineteenth century, and in the past ten years, archaeological study has started to gather material culture evidence for the time period. Mikindani started to appear on European-made maps and charts in the latter half of the eighteenth century under the name Quindarmis. The notes that go with those records mention that the town is home to a "King's residence."

They also observed its increasing affluence over time: in 1881, Captain Foot stated that "Mikindani had prospered immensely since Livingstone visited it," despite David Livingstone's visit to the city in 1866 being mostly unimpressed by its people and business. The archives make it abundantly evident that this prosperity was achieved at the expense of people who were held as slaves and that the slave trade in Mikindani continued long after Great Britain convinced the Zanzibar Sultanate to outlaw the practise in the 1870s. If anything, the ensuing decline in the cost of slaves made it possible for richer, more affluent people in the area to hire slaves to work on their farms and newly established rubber plantations.

The Swahili Chronicle of Mikindani is a significant source of historical data during this era. The town's and its area's oral histories were recorded at the request of Carl Velten, the German governor of East Africa's interpreter at the time, in the late nineteenth century. It, too, highlighted the locals' participation in the slave trade and copal exports in the Indian Ocean, as well as the Sultanate of Zanzibar's significant impact in how the town's residents "learned to do business." Periodic mentions of locals who emulate the Swahili cultural ideal of urbane gentlemen (waungwana) are also made.

Additionally, the chronicle emphasised ethnic tensions and divides in the town that were only hinted at in the texts from Europe. It's interesting to note that the town's founders were Makonde, the biggest non-Swahili ethnic group in this region of Tanzania. In contrast to practically every other Swahili account, the Makonde were not quickly and completely replaced by Muslim immigration but rather remained a significant part of the history.

Makonde and Arab relationships were said to be tense, with disputes requiring Zanzibari mediation and rumours of men from the Arabian Peninsula robbing locals of their slaves. This more complicated situation is reminiscent of European accounts from the 1880s that claimed Makonde groups in southern Tanzania recognised the sultan of Zanzibar as the legitimate ruler, but that his rule was largely ineffective once one moved inland, as evidenced by the continued presence of the slave trade.

Archaeological proof of Mikindani's peak in the nineteenth century is evident. European clay ceramics were the most distinctive artefacts of trade in the Indian Ocean throughout the nineteenth century. These containers were discovered in large quantities at Mikindani, where they made up as much as 34% of the entire assemblage in some areas of the city.

The majority of these ceramics had underglaze floral patterns in blue, green, yellow, and maroon colours on white backgrounds. When the vessel's shape could be recreated, it was always a sizable open bowl. These sherds are illustrations of the European ceramics that were reportedly imported in significant quantities in the nineteenth century. One piece was a base with a potter's mark made by the French manufacture Opaque du Sarreguemines in the second part of the nineteenth century. Northern Mozambique has also uncovered nineteenth-century contexts with pottery from this French manufacture, highlighting the connections between this region of the coast and French colonies in the Indian Ocean.

In the later nineteenth century, other groups of material culture also point to rising prosperity. The test excavations in Mikindani revealed a rise in the era's use of pricey coral-stone structures. There were also a lot of pieces of imported Indian pottery, which were identifiable by their thin walls, orange-pink paste, and red or brown slip patterns. Such pottery were ubiquitous along India's western coast, but the Mikindani vessels might also have been regional imitations, probably created by local Indian potters.

The dispersion of imported ceramics is a clear indicator of Mikindani's rise as a thriving port city and the centre of the surrounding economy. Mikindani's regional dominance may be seen when comparing its import ratio to other settlements in the area.The proportions and numbers of imports from Europe and India were higher at Mikindani, moderate at bigger nearby communities, and low at the farthest and smallest sites. It has been suggested that these patterns of distribution correspond to the stonetown-controlled dispersal of imported products elsewhere on the coast and that they meet expectations from archaeological applications of Central Place Theory. The distribution of imported items, which is concentrated close to the main Friday mosque, also points to patterns of distinction within the Mikindani population.

Mikindani's experience suggests that, just as Kilwa's emergence contributed to Mikindani's absence from early second millennium networks and Kilwa's decline allowed Mikindani to reengage, the ability to realise this ideal at many Swahili sites would have been constrained by the competition between Swahili cities. In these circumstances, it was possible for different cultural values and concepts of regional identity to arise. At Mikindani, this was tangibly emphasised by the production of local pottery with characteristics similar to those in the interior and the long-term durability of those ceramics.

The inhabitants of Mikindani were no less "Swahili" when they eventually appeared in the historical record because of their absence from early second-millennium trade or their connections to the interior. In addition to all of that, these locations also contributed to the dynamic coastal economic networks and the coastal culture we regard as Swahili.

== Geography ==
Mikindani town is located on the gently sloping hills of the southern coast of Mikindani Harbour, a small roughly heart shaped natural harbour off Mikindani Bay. The southern arm of the harbour mouth contains a small collection of houses (and a holiday complex) called Litingi. On the far side of the mouth is a small village called Pemba. There are salt pans located just past the mouth of the bay, on the ocean side.

Admiralty Chart No 684 Mtwara and Mikindani Harbours, Published 1950

== Economy ==
The Town is located on the main Mtwara-Lindi road, about 10 km from Mtwara. The main economic activity in Mikindani is trade at 84% of the adult population engaging in the activity, followed by 12.4% of the residents working in small scale agriculture.

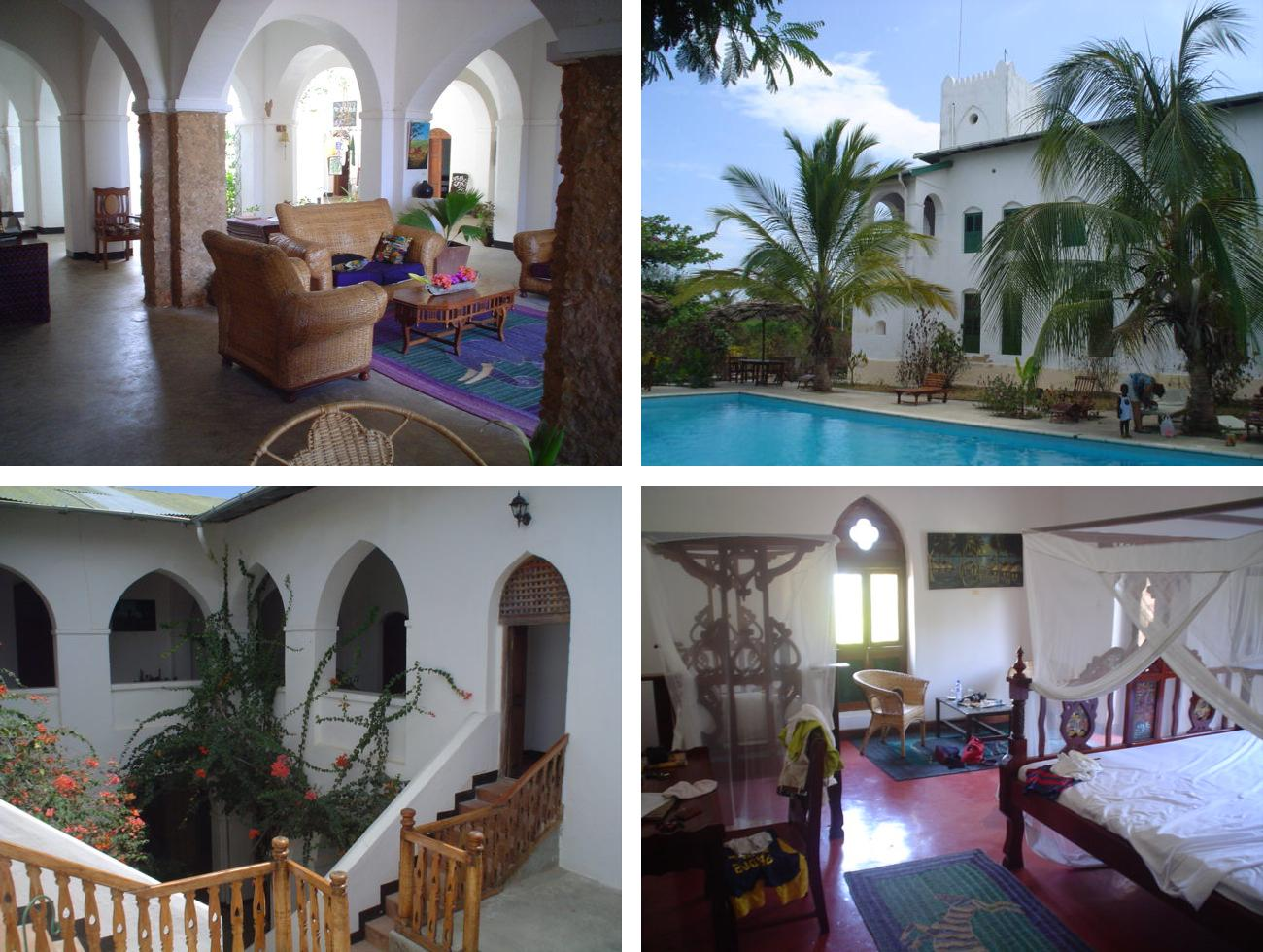
Top left clockwise the lounge, the outdoor swimming pool, a bedroom and the staircases of the Old Boma hotel.

== Non-governmental organizations ==
Trade Aid has been based in Mikindani since 1997 when it undertook the renovation of the old German Boma to create the vocational training centre and tourist development hub at the Old Boma Hotel. Trainees undertake a course of vocational training in the hospitality and tourism sector as well as undertaking English and IT tuition. Other trainees have had instruction in accountancy, renovation, driving and heritage. The employment rate of trainees is over 80% with employment across Tanzania, the Middle East and Europe.

The environmental and cultural conservation of Mikindani is also a focus of Trade Aid with the ongoing conservation of historic buildings and working with Tanzanian government to declare Mikindani as a protected Conservation Zone in 2017. As well as the Old Boma significant buildings that have been renovated are the old market, the old bank and the reputed dwelling place of Dr David Livingstone which now houses the town's museum also run by Trade Aid.

Mikindani Museum was established in 2018 the museum features a collection of historic and personal items that each tell a unique story about the people of Mikindani. The museum features an ongoing oral history project aiming at memorialising the history of the Mikindani as the people remember it.

EdUKaid has been working in Mikindani since 2003 in partnership with local communities to improve the quality of education through supporting; primary school development, pre-primary education, inclusive education, extra tuition, child sponsorship and vocational training. To date (2023) over 50,000 children have benefitted through improved education due to EdUKaid's support.

== Images of Mikindani ==
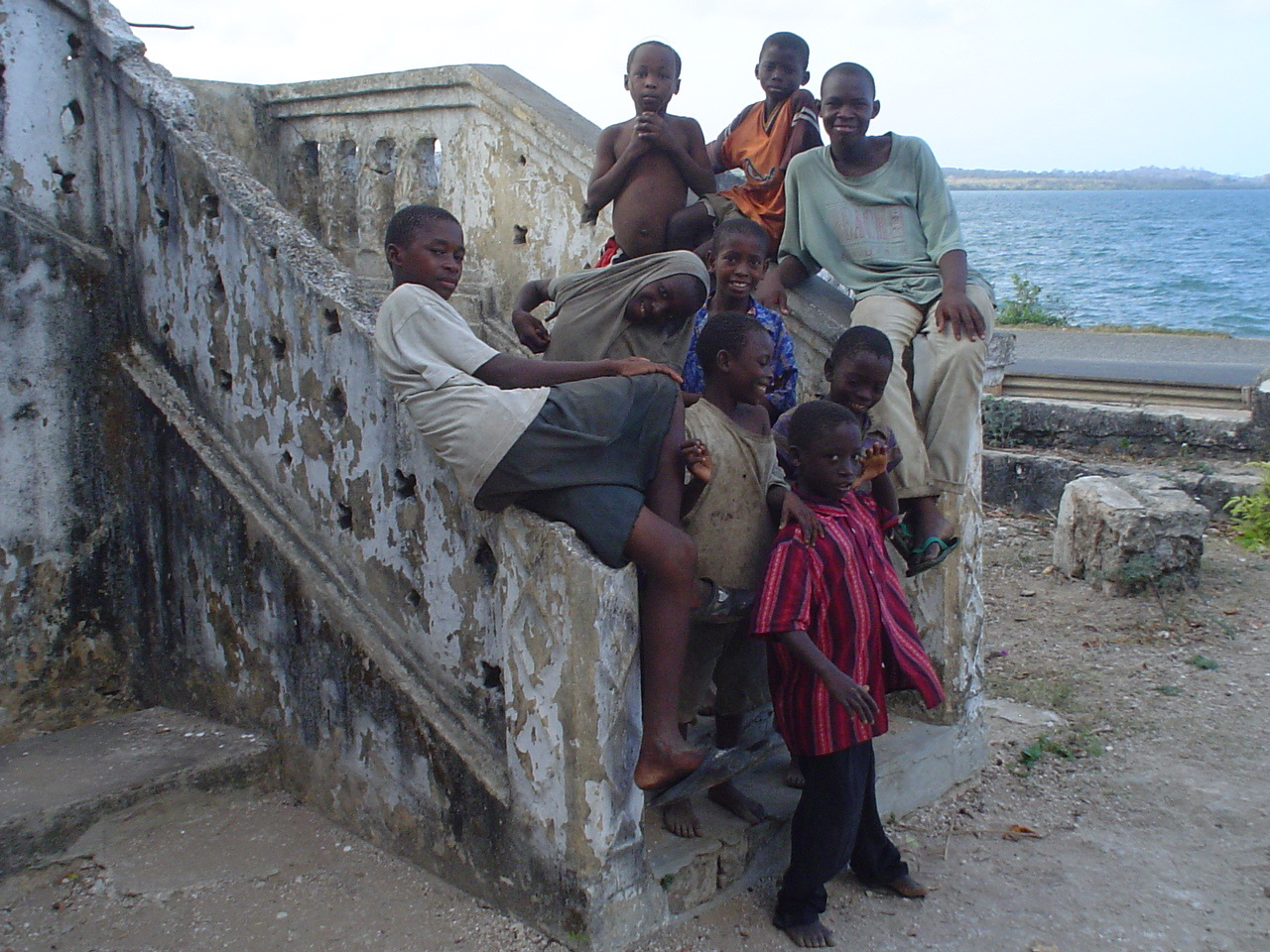
Boys posing for the camera near the bay at Mikindani.

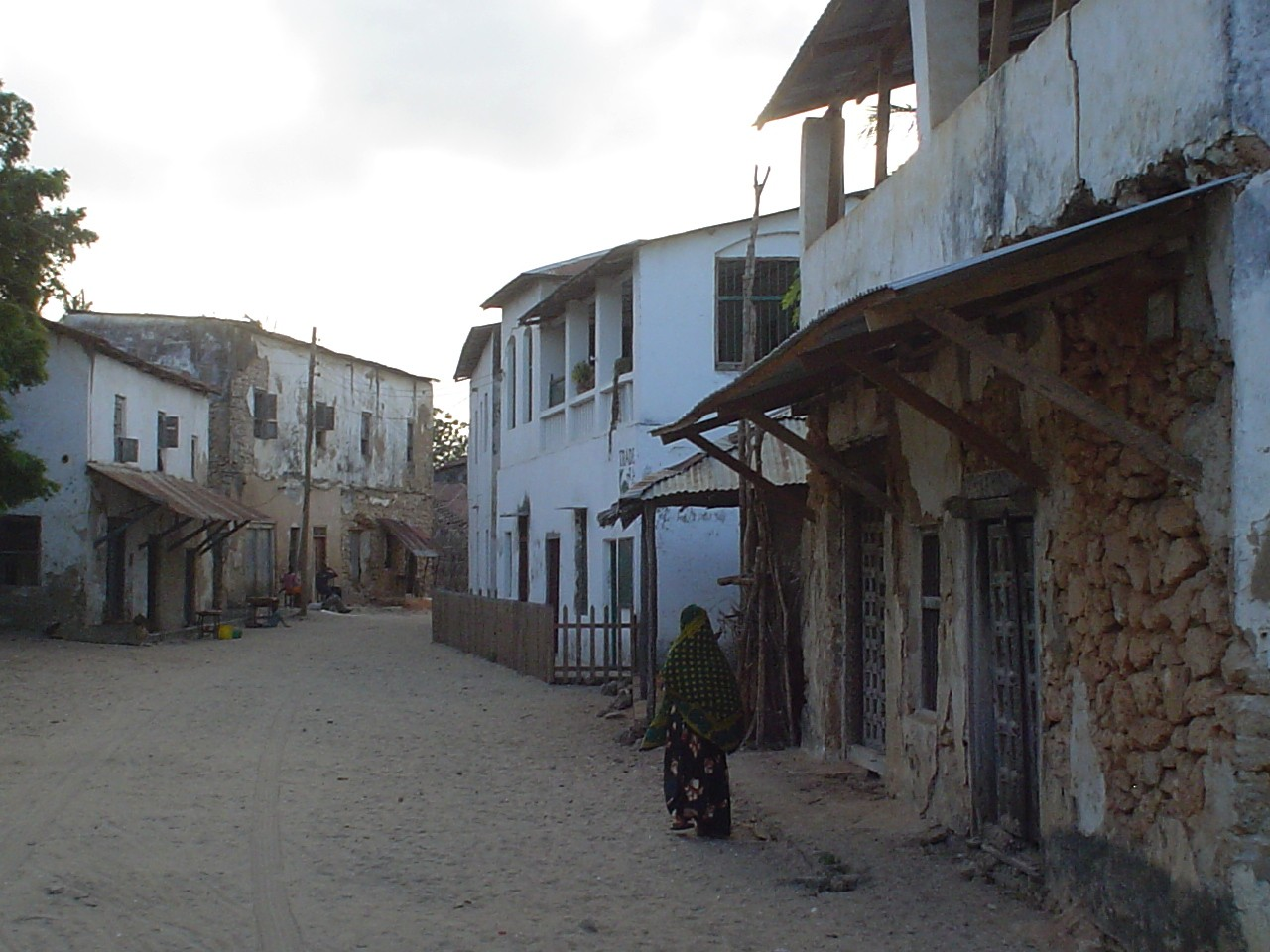
The Street with the Livingstone House on the right.

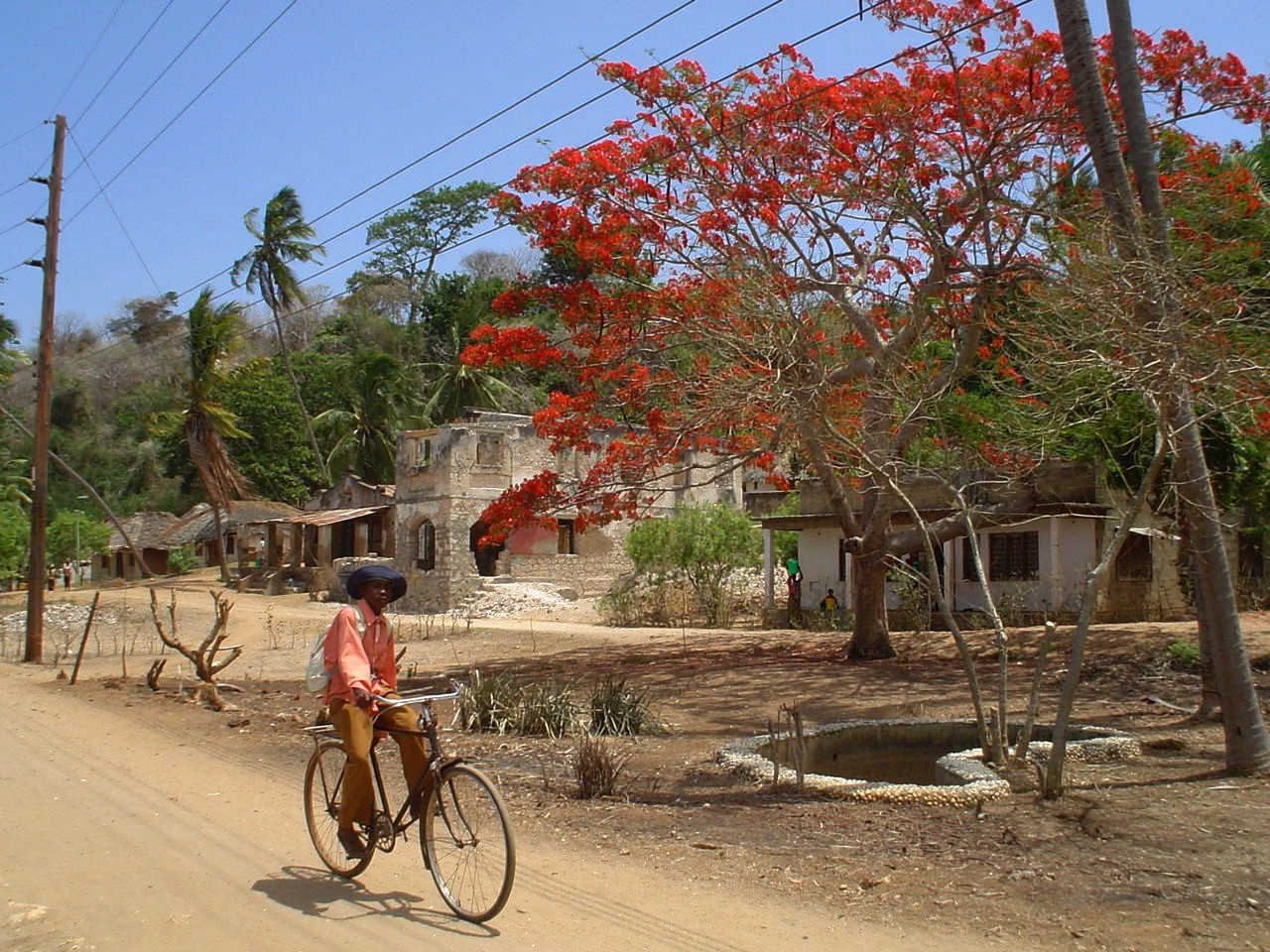
A street scene with a cyclist.

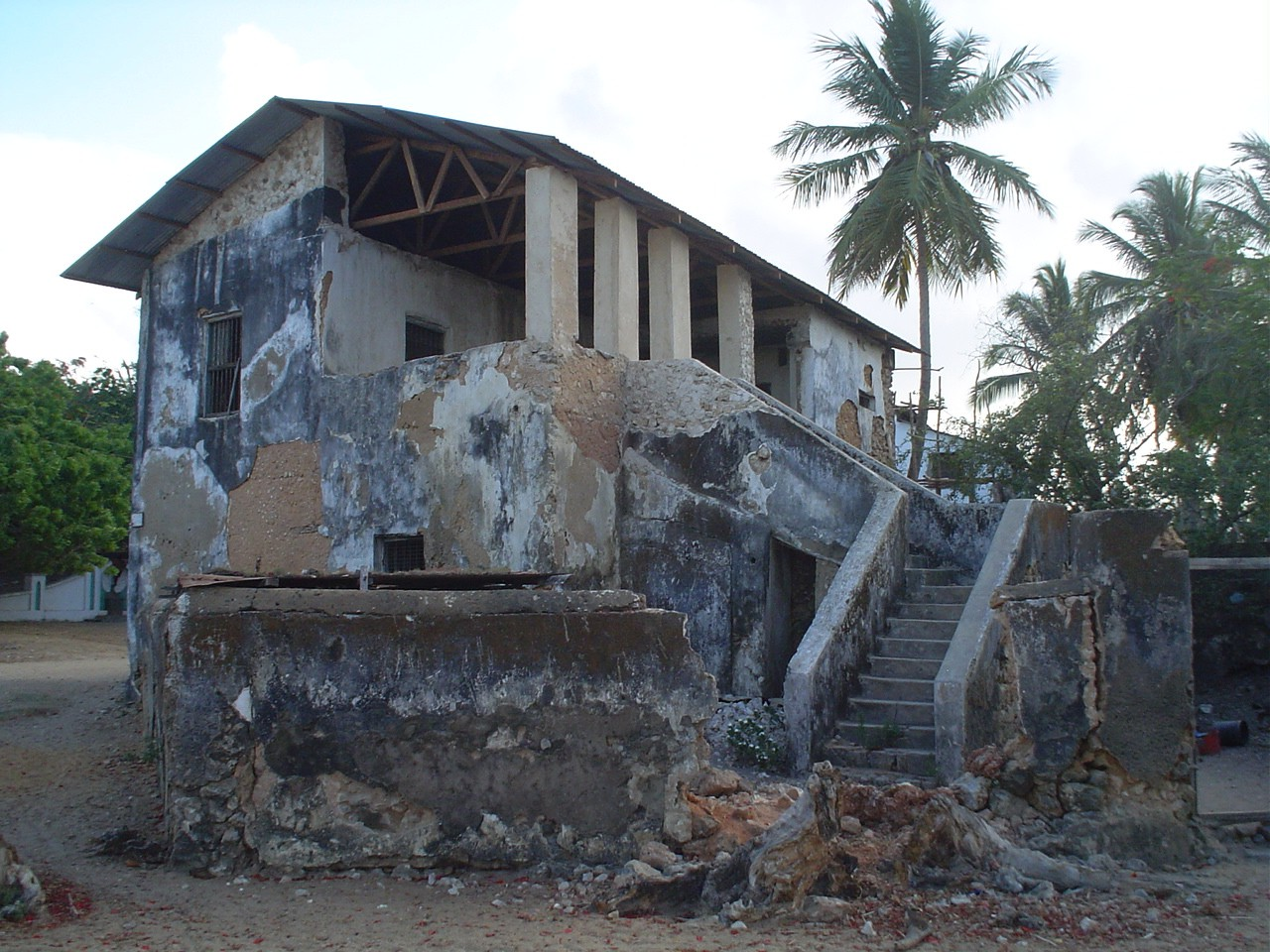
The Livingstone House.

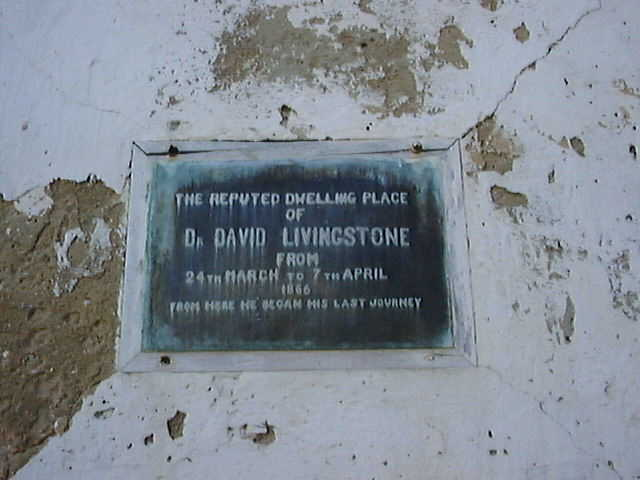
A plaque on the Livingstone House.

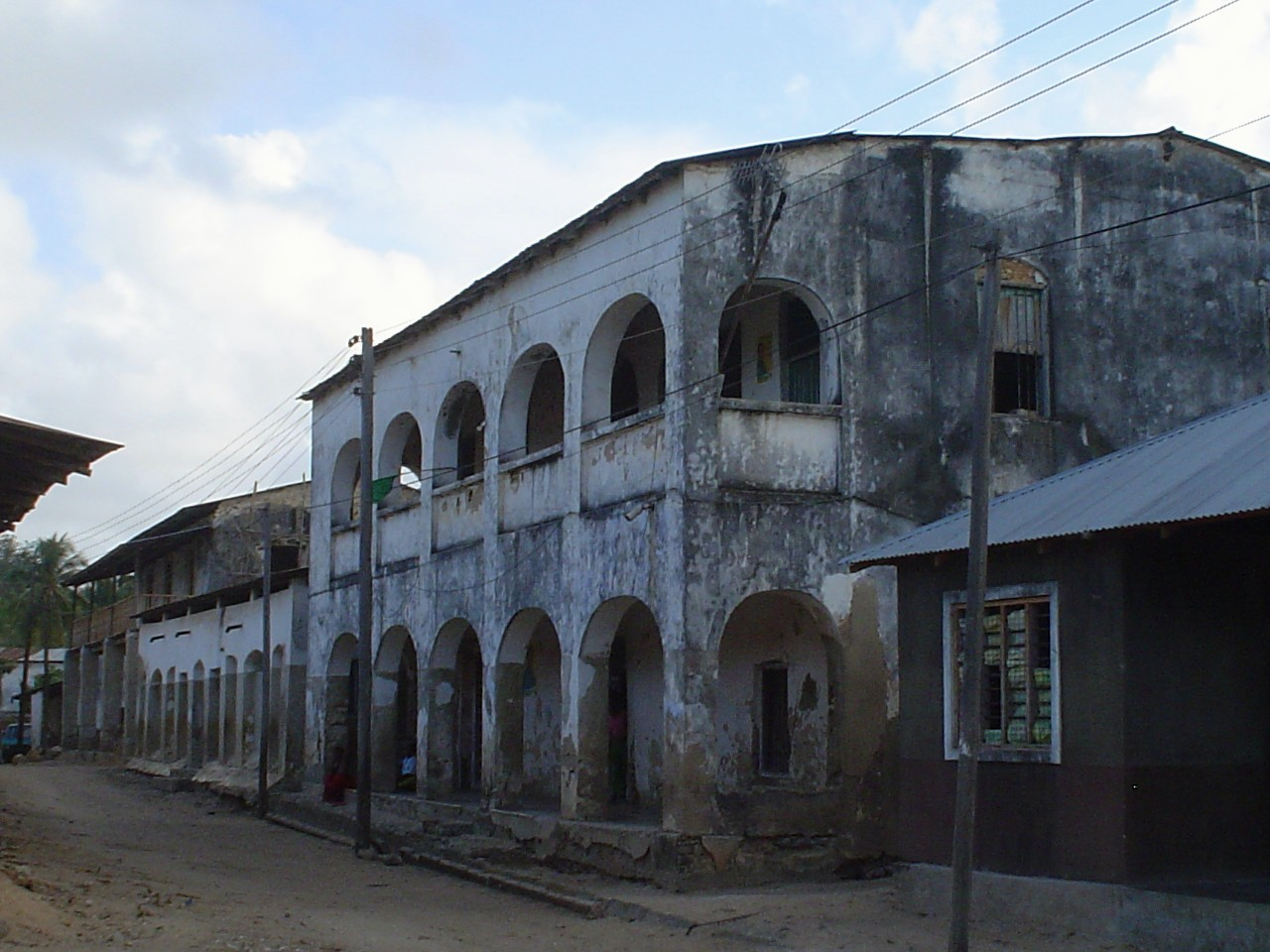
One of the quiet street in central Mikindani.

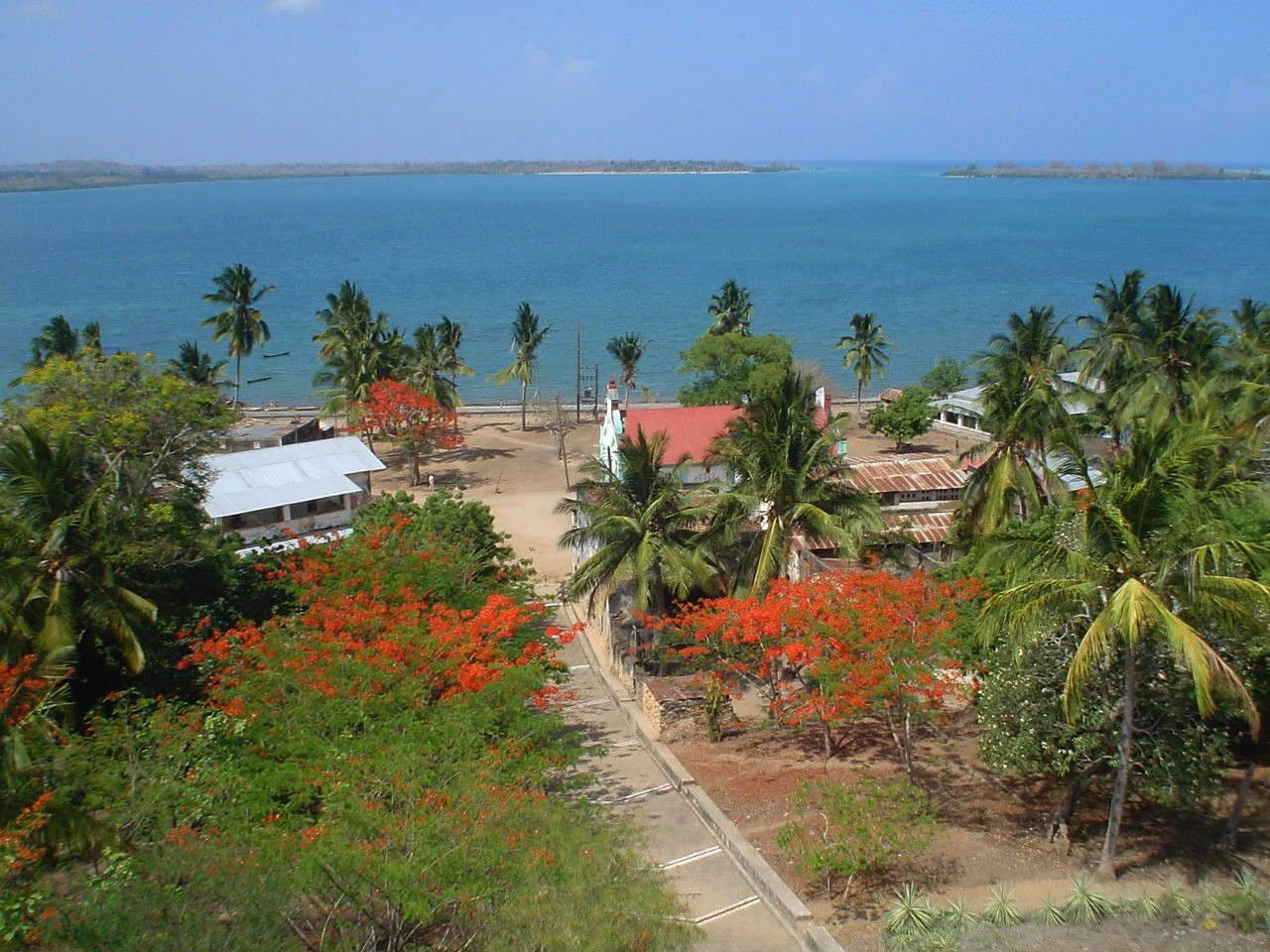
The Mikindani Bay seen from the Old Boma Hotel.

The former Mikindani slave market.

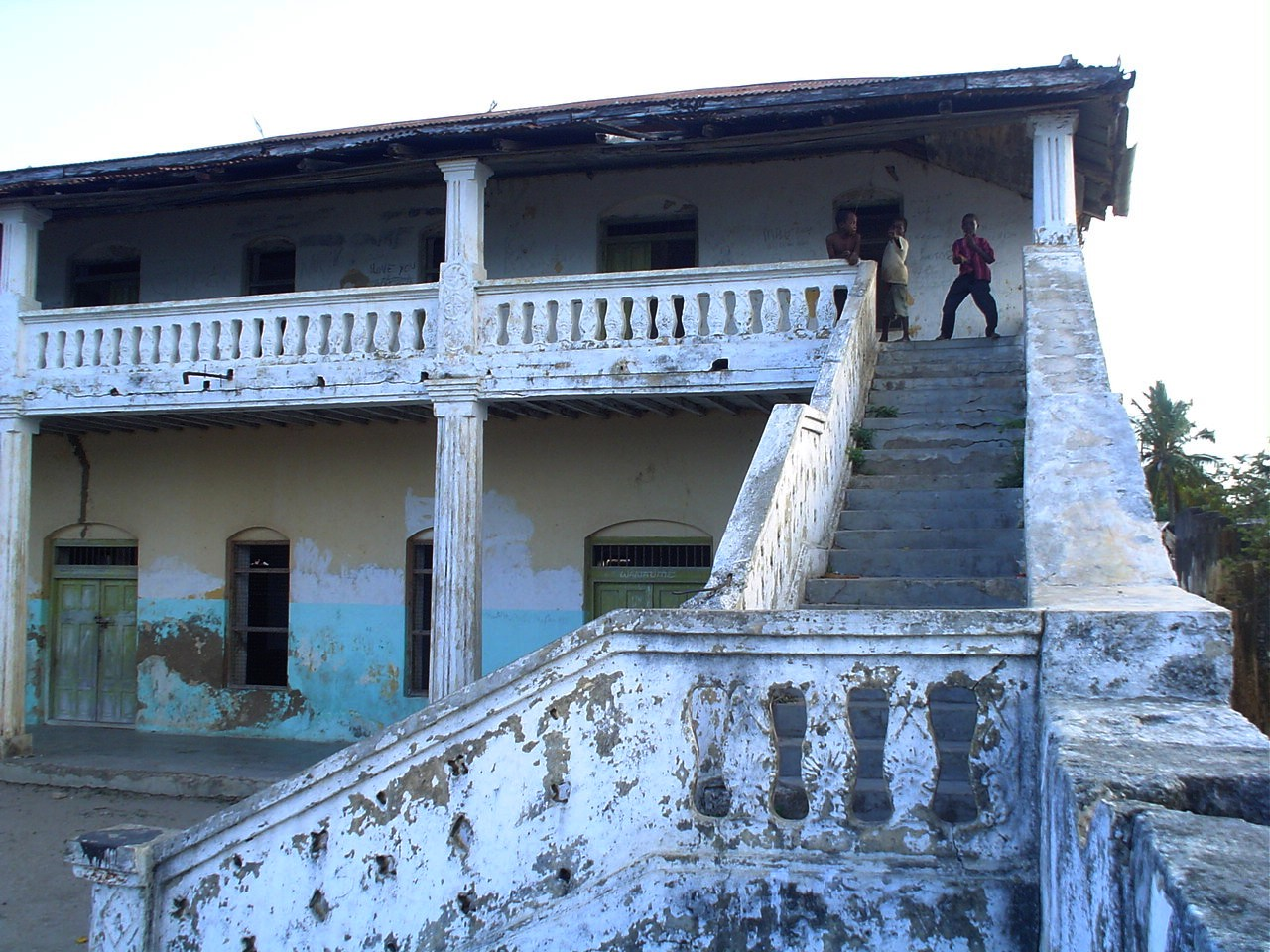
A Colonial style building (school?).

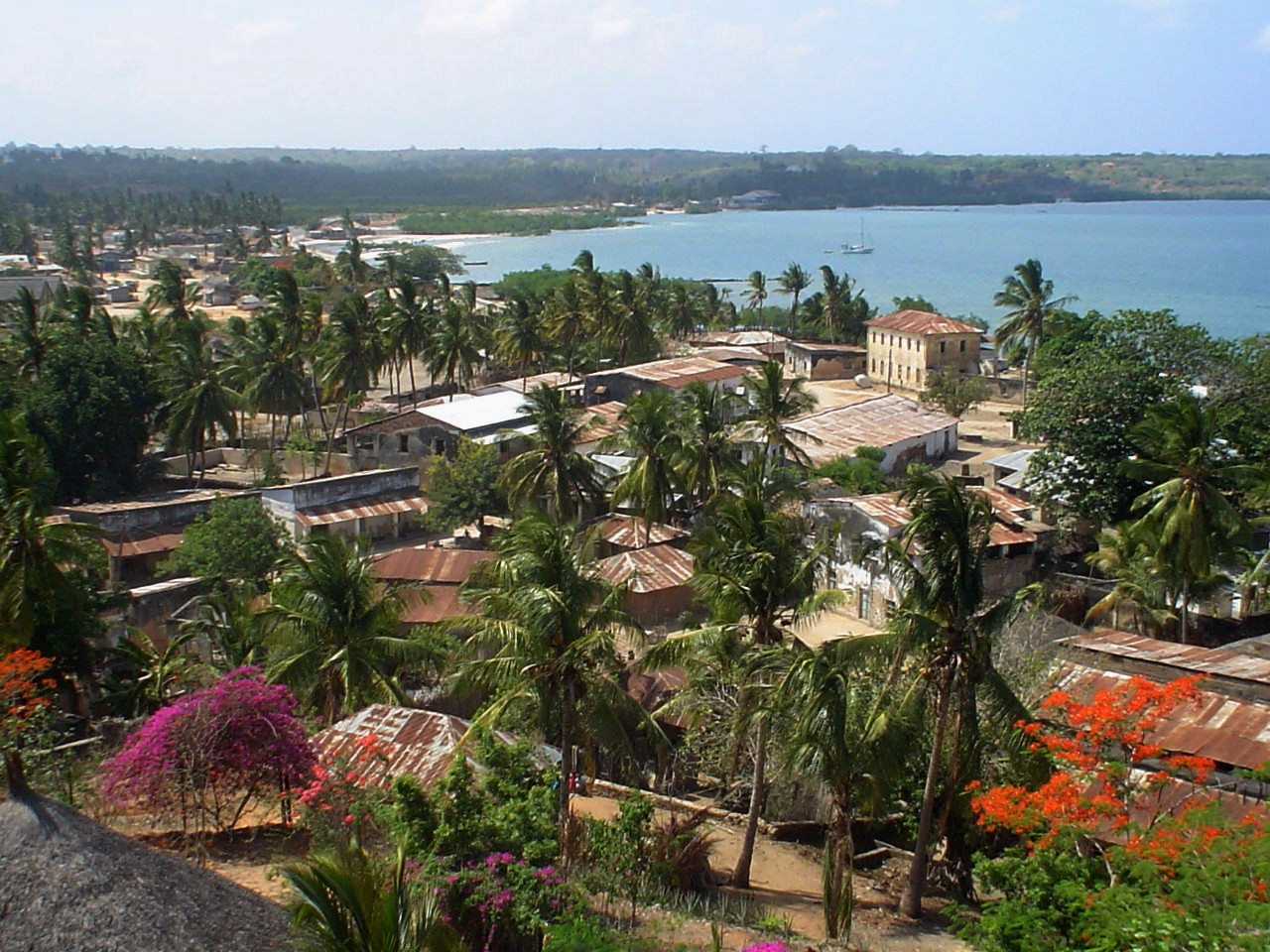
A view over the town during the daytime.

== See also ==
Historic Swahili Settlements
