= Rondo Plateau =

Plateau in Lindi and Mtwara Regions, Tanzania

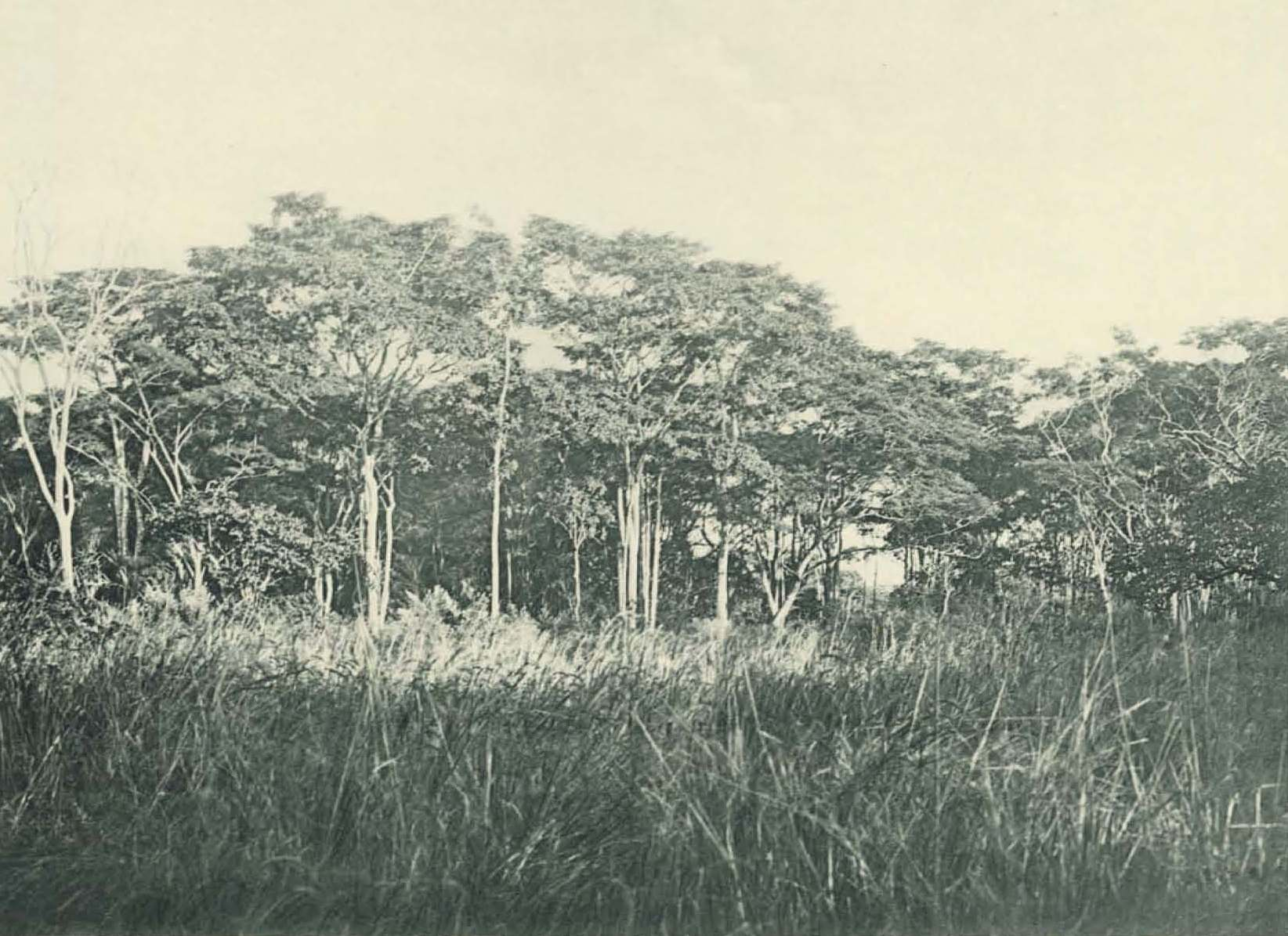
- African teak on the Rondo Plateau, c.1908

Highest point
- Elevation: 900 m (3,000 ft)
- Coordinates: 10°09′S 39°15′E

Geography
- Location within Tanzania
- Country: Tanzania
- Region: Lindi

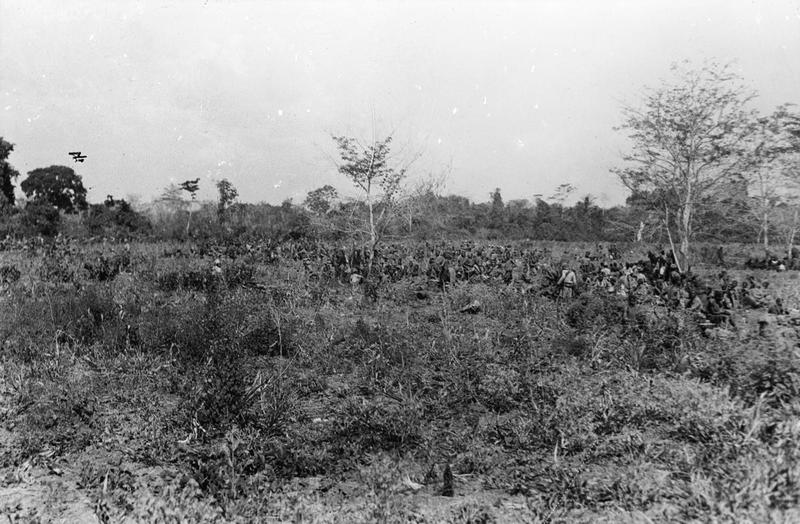
The Nigerian brigade halts on the Rondo Plateau, October 1917, World War I

The Rondo Plateau, also known as the Muera Plateau, is a high and extensive massif in the Lindi Region and northern Mtwara Region of southeastern of Tanzania. A portion of the plateau is protected by the Rondo Forest Reserve. It is one of a group of dissected plateaus lying between the Mbwemburu and Lukuledi rivers. It is approximately 60 km inland from Lindi, and is situated 15 km north of the Masasi road. It was revealed as an important biodiversity site in studies conducted since the 1980s.

== Climate ==
The plateaus rise behind a narrow coastal plain. They receive considerable orographic precipitation, making the plateaus cooler and wetter than the surrounding lowlands. The average annual rainfall is 1088 mm (1951-1979), recorded at the Rondo Forest station. The highest rainfall occurs between November and January, and March to May.

== Flora ==
It is an important stand of primary coastal forest in Tanzania, but also contains elements of montane forest, as it reaches 900 metres in altitude. The higher slopes are covered in extensive semi-deciduous hardwood forest, constituting over 18 square km of closed canopy forest. The plateau vegetation is diverse, with areas of scrub forest, dry evergreen forest, riverine forest, miombo (Brachystegia) woodland, and thicket. Some 100 species of plant are endemic to the area.

The plateau was once covered by extensive forests of Mvule or African teak (Milicia excelsa), but the forests were heavily logged from the 1950s onwards. Logging stopped in the 1980s, and since then the forests have regrown, and some areas were planted with Milicia excelsa. Milicia excelsa is still one of the dominant species in the 25 m high canopy within the Rondo Forest Reserve. Other dominant canopy species are Albizia gummifera, Dombeya sp., Ricinodendron heudelotii, and Dialium holtzii.

The forest reserve also has areas of forest plantation, mostly Pinus sp. with small trial plots of Milicia excelsa, Teak (Tectona grandis) and Maesopsis eminii.

== Fauna ==
The plateau is home to various species of monkey and small mammals. The Rondo dwarf galago was discovered here in the 1990s by Simon Bearder.

== Conservation ==
Though a forest reserve since colonial times, much wood was harvested in the 1950s, when some 20 square km of forest was cleared to establish exotic plantations, chiefly pine.

== Rondo Nature Forest Reserve ==
The Rondo Nature Forest Reserve covers an area 11,742.26 ha, with a boundary of 51.6 km.

Other forest reserves in the plateau region are Chitoa (770 ha), Litipo (1000 ha), Makangala (1271 ha), Ndimba (2687 ha), and Ruawa (2949 ha). The Noto Plateau is home to 12,000 ha of dry evergreen forest which has no protected status.
