= Sultanate of M'Simbati =

Defunct micronation

- Unrecognized micronation
- Claimed by: Latham Leslie Moore
- Established: 1959
- Area claimed: 1.6 square kilometres (0.62 mi^{2})
- Location: 25 kilometres (16 mi) southeast of Mtwara, Tanganyika Territory/Tanzania

The Sultanate of M'Simbati was a micronation founded in 1959 in Tanganyika by Englishman Latham Leslie Moore, approximately 25 km southeast of Mtwara.

== Life events of Latham Leslie Moore ==
Latham Leslie-Moore was born in Paddington, London, United Kingdom in 1893. During World War I, he served as a second lieutenant and then lieutenant in the Royal Field Artillery. Moore purchased the physical property of the sultanate at auction in 1940's.

== Formation of the nation ==
In 1959 the country of Tanganyika was a colony of the United Kingdom— Moore purchased an island/ peninsula and corresponded with the colonial governors of the colony declaring his secession and asking for formal recognition of his sultanate. When Tanganyika later merged with the People's Republic of Zanzibar and Pemba to form modern day Tanzania, Moore also corresponded with the nation's new president, Julius Nyerere, requesting recognition of his state, as well as to the United Nations. None of these requests was ever honored, however.

== Flag ==
The flag was loosely based upon other contemporary traditional British Empire flags containing a tricolor of red, blue and green with a Union Flag in the canton.

== In popular culture ==
Moore and the sultanate were featured in the 1983 book No Man's Land: The Last of White Africa by John Heminway.

The Sultanate was also featured in the book Colours of the Fleet, by Malcolm Farrow, OBE, which strived to provide a compendium of all known instances of flags based on British designs.

== See also ==
- List of micronations
