= Lukuledi River =

River in Lindi Region

Coordinates: 10°05′S 39°42′E

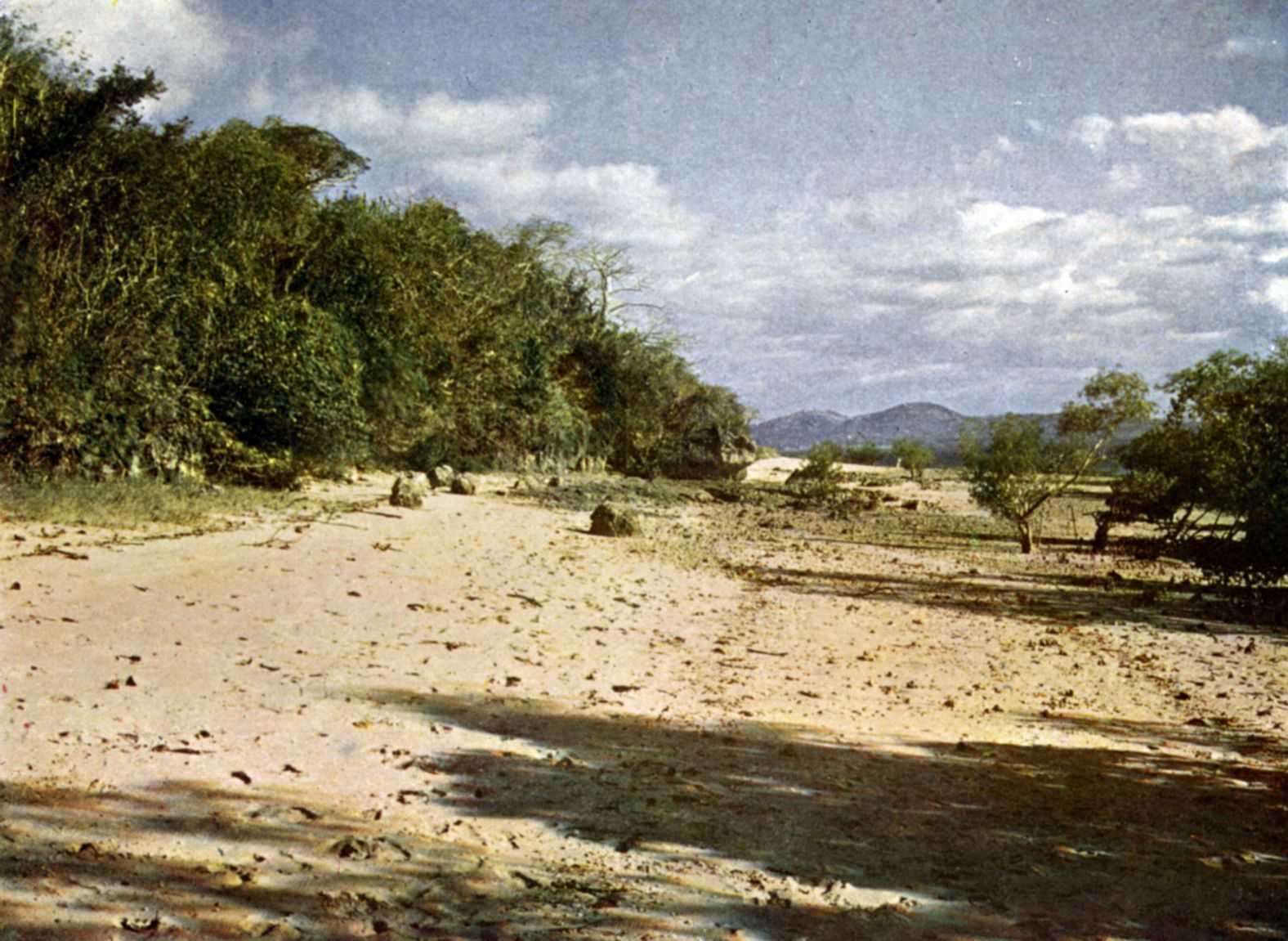

Location
- Country: Tanzania
- Region: Lindi Region
- Region: Mtwara Region

Physical characteristics
- Source: Eastern miombo woodlands ecoregion
  - location: Tanzania
- Mouth: Indian Ocean
- Length: 160 km (99 mi)

The Lukuledi is a river in The United Republic Of Tanzania, south-eastern region of Africa. With a total length of 160 km, it rises from the boundary between the Lindi and Mtwara regions.

The Lukuledi runs east-north-eastwards in Lindi Region, emptying into the Indian Ocean near Lindi. It separates the Rondo and Makonde plateaus. In the dry season, its discharge reduces substantially, and only the last 40 km of the river's course are never totally dry.

The western, or upper, portion of Lukuledi watershed lies within the Eastern miombo woodlands ecoregion. the eastern or lower portion of the watershed lies within the coastal Southern Zanzibar-Inhambane coastal forest mosaic ecoregion.
