= Mtwara =

Capital city of Mtwara Region, Tanzania

- City of Mtwara Region
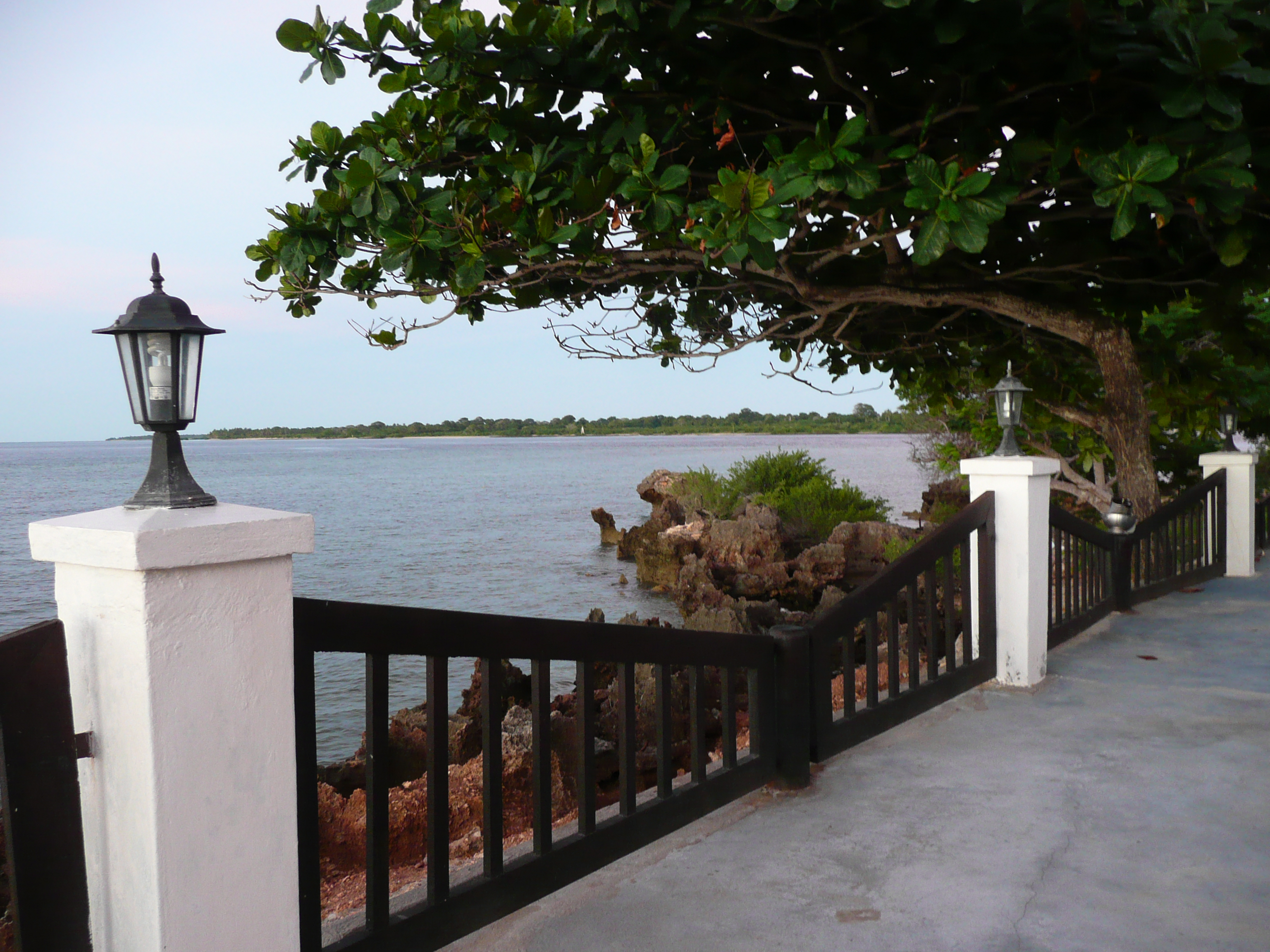
- The western shores of the Indian Ocean as seen from Mtwara.

- Location of Mtwara Mtwara (Africa) Mtwara (Earth)
- Coordinates: 10°16′25″S 40°10′58″E
- Country: Tanzania
- Region: Mtwara Region
- Proclamation of the Region: 1971

Government
  - Regional Commissioner: Hon. Col Patrick Sawala
  - Regional Administrative Secretary: Bahati I. Geuzye

Population (2022 census)
  - Total: 140,793
- Time zone: UTC+3 (EAT)
- Climate: Aw
- Website: Town website

Mtwara (Portuguese: Montewara) is the capital city of Mtwara Region in southeastern Tanzania. In the 1940s, it was planned and constructed as the export facility for the disastrous Tanganyika groundnut scheme, but was somewhat neglected when the scheme was abandoned in 1951. The city is spread out over a large area planned to accommodate up to 200,000 people. The present population is around 141,000. As part of the development associated with the failed Tanganyika groundnut scheme, Mtwara features a deep-water port that can accommodate ocean-going vessels, and a range of large municipal buildings, including a post office. Recent improvements in the port made it possible for big container ships to berth there.

== Transportation ==
=== Road ===
Mtwara has reasonable transport links considering its remoteness in southern Tanzania. It is linked by paved roads with Dar es Salaam and Lindi to the north and Masasi inland and by partially paved roads to Newala in-land to the west. Beyond Masasi the road is newly paved towards Songea via Tunduru and Namtumbo and the Unity Bridge which provides a crossing point to Mozambique.

=== Airport ===
The A19 links it with Mbamba Bay on Lake Malawi in the west. It features an airport with a new paved runway that can accommodate medium size passenger jets up to Boeing 737 and Airbus. Precision Air runs a daily morning flight between Mtwara Airport and Dar es Salaam and Air Tanzania offers a flight in the afternoon. The flight time is around an hour. Current improvement of the airport makes it possible for landing in the day and night or in the mist.

=== Bus ===
Mtwara serves as the access point for a small but growing tourism industry based in nearby Mikindani. New roads of a good standard were being built in 2013 within the city. Most of the roads have never been sealed. There is a choice of bus companies which provide daily services between Mtwara and Dar es Salaam. Also regular buses connect with Masasi, the biggest town inland from Mtwara.

=== Port ===
The port is the third largest ocean port in the country and was built as part of the failed Tanganyika groundnut scheme. The port was neglected for many years, however with the recent economic boom in the region, the government has spent funds for the upgrade of the port. Recently the port has seen added activity due to the construction of the Dangote cement factory, increased gas exploration activities and the recent energy crisis, has seen Mtwara port used as port for transporting Coal. Current stastus according to TPA is that the port of Mtwara is now transporting Fuel cargo to Malawi, Zambia and other neighbouring countries. The port in the future is planned to facilitate exports such as Cashew nuts, Iron, Coal and Gas. The port also has an Export Processing zone to facilitate the manufacturing industry in the area. New Port for dirty cargo such as Cement and Coal which was planned to be constructed at Mgao Village near Mikindani, it is now under construction.This will boost the southern economy at large

== Economy ==
=== Iron ore and coal ===
Mtwara might be the port for the export of iron ore and coal. There are plans to build a railway linking Mtwara with Lindi and mines at Mchuchuma and Liganga via Songea.

In the year 2003, there were proposals for transporting coal from the Ludewa and Njombe regions respectively by rail to the port of Mtwara in Southern Tanzania as part of the Mtwara Development Corridor project.

=== Cement ===
Mtwara hosts a branch of the Dangote Cement Public Limited Company and a medium scale cement factory owned by Chinese company called Xinghao group at Mikindani and sells cement under Lulu Cement Brand.

== Geography ==
=== Climate ===
Due to close proximity to the equator and the warm Indian Ocean, the city experiences tropical climatic conditions similar to all Tanzanian coastal cities. The city experiences hot and humid weather throughout much of the year and has a tropical wet and dry climate (Köppen: Aw). Annual rainfall is approximately 1,024 mm (40 in), and in a normal year the rainy season lasts from November to April/May and the dry season from then until late October.

Climate data for Mtwara (1991-2020)
Month	Jan	Feb	Mar	Apr	May	Jun	Jul	Aug	Sep	Oct	Nov	Dec	Year
Record high °C (°F)	34.4 (93.9)	35.0 (95.0)	36.1 (97.0)	33.9 (93.0)	32.8 (91.0)	32.2 (90.0)	33.3 (91.9)	33.3 (91.9)	35.0 (95.0)	36.1 (97.0)	36.1 (97.0)	34.1 (93.4)	36.1 (97.0)
Mean daily maximum °C (°F)	30.7 (87.3)	30.8 (87.4)	31.1 (88.0)	30.9 (87.6)	30.3 (86.5)	29.5 (85.1)	29.4 (84.9)	29.8 (85.6)	30.0 (86.0)	31.5 (88.7)	31.3 (88.3)	30.5 (86.9)	30.1 (86.2)
Daily mean °C (°F)	27.2 (81.0)	27.1 (80.8)	26.8 (80.2)	26.5 (79.7)	25.8 (78.4)	24.3 (75.7)	24.1 (75.4)	23.9 (75.0)	24.7 (76.5)	25.7 (78.3)	26.8 (80.2)	27.3 (81.1)	25.9 (78.5)
Mean daily minimum °C (°F)	23.8 (74.8)	23.5 (74.3)	23.1 (73.6)	22.6 (72.7)	21.3 (70.3)	19.7 (67.5)	18.9 (66.0)	18.6 (65.5)	19.0 (66.2)	20.4 (68.7)	22.1 (71.8)	23.5 (74.3)	21.4 (70.5)
Record low °C (°F)	20.6 (69.1)	20.2 (68.4)	21.1 (70.0)	19.4 (66.9)	15.0 (59.0)	13.9 (57.0)	15.0 (59.0)	15.0 (59.0)	16.0 (60.8)	17.2 (63.0)	18.3 (64.9)	19.9 (67.8)	13.9 (57.0)
Average precipitation mm (inches)	183.2 (7.21)	180.9 (7.12)	237.5 (9.35)	160.6 (6.32)	54.0 (2.13)	10.5 (0.41)	7.7 (0.30)	10.1 (0.40)	12.9 (0.51)	28.9 (1.14)	52.0 (2.05)	143.3 (5.64)	1,081.6 (42.58)
Average precipitation days (≥ 1.0 mm)	11.2	10.4	15.0	11.9	5.1	1.8	1.5	1.7	2.3	3.1	5.0	9.6	78.6
Average relative humidity (%)	79	84	82	83	70	72	70	71	74	76	76	79	76
Mean monthly sunshine hours	229.4	189.3	217.0	225.0	263.5	267.0	266.6	285.2	270.0	303.8	297.0	263.5	3,077.3
Mean daily sunshine hours	7.4	6.7	7.0	7.5	8.5	8.9	8.6	9.2	9.0	9.8	9.9	8.5	8.4
Source 1: NOAA
Source 2: Deutscher Wetterdienst (extremes, humidity, and sun), Tokyo Climate Center (mean temperatures 1991–2020)

== Sports ==
=== Football (Soccer) ===
Mtwara is the hometown of Bandari F.C. and NDANDA F. C.

== Twin town ==
Mtwara is twinned with Redditch, England.

== See also ==
- Railway stations in Tanzania
- Mtwara Development Corridor
- Cashew production in Tanzania
- Sultanate of M’Simbati
