= Lindi =

Historic town and regional capital of Lindi Region, southern Tanzania

Lindi Town
- Port city of Lindi Region
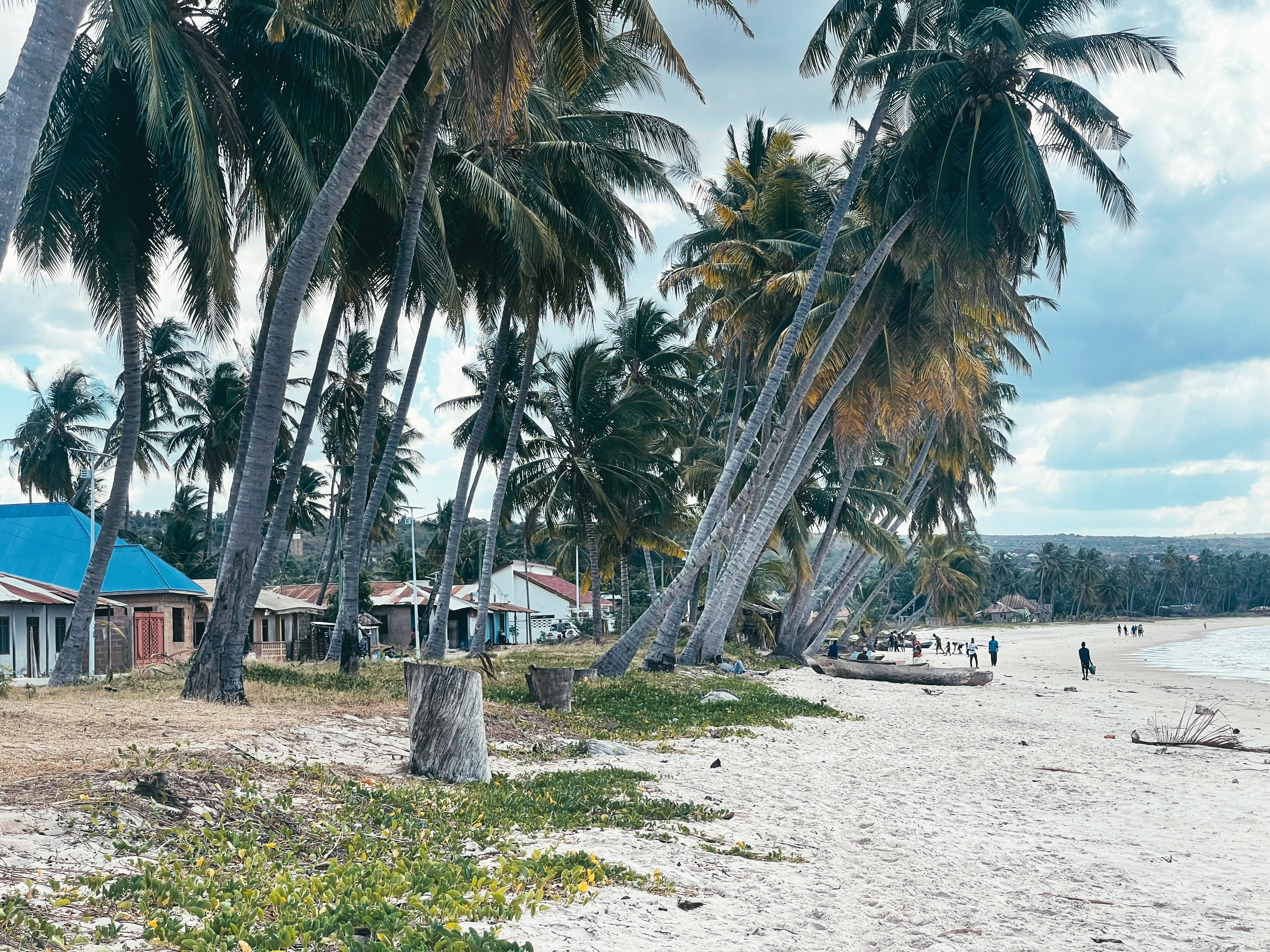
- Lindi Town bay side
- Nickname: Tanzania's coconut capital
- Location In Tanzania#
- Coordinates: 9°59′49″S 39°42′52″E
- Country: Tanzania
- Region: Lindi Region

Population (2022 census)
  - Total: 95,096
- Time zone: UTC+3 (EAT)
- Area code: 023
- Website: Country website

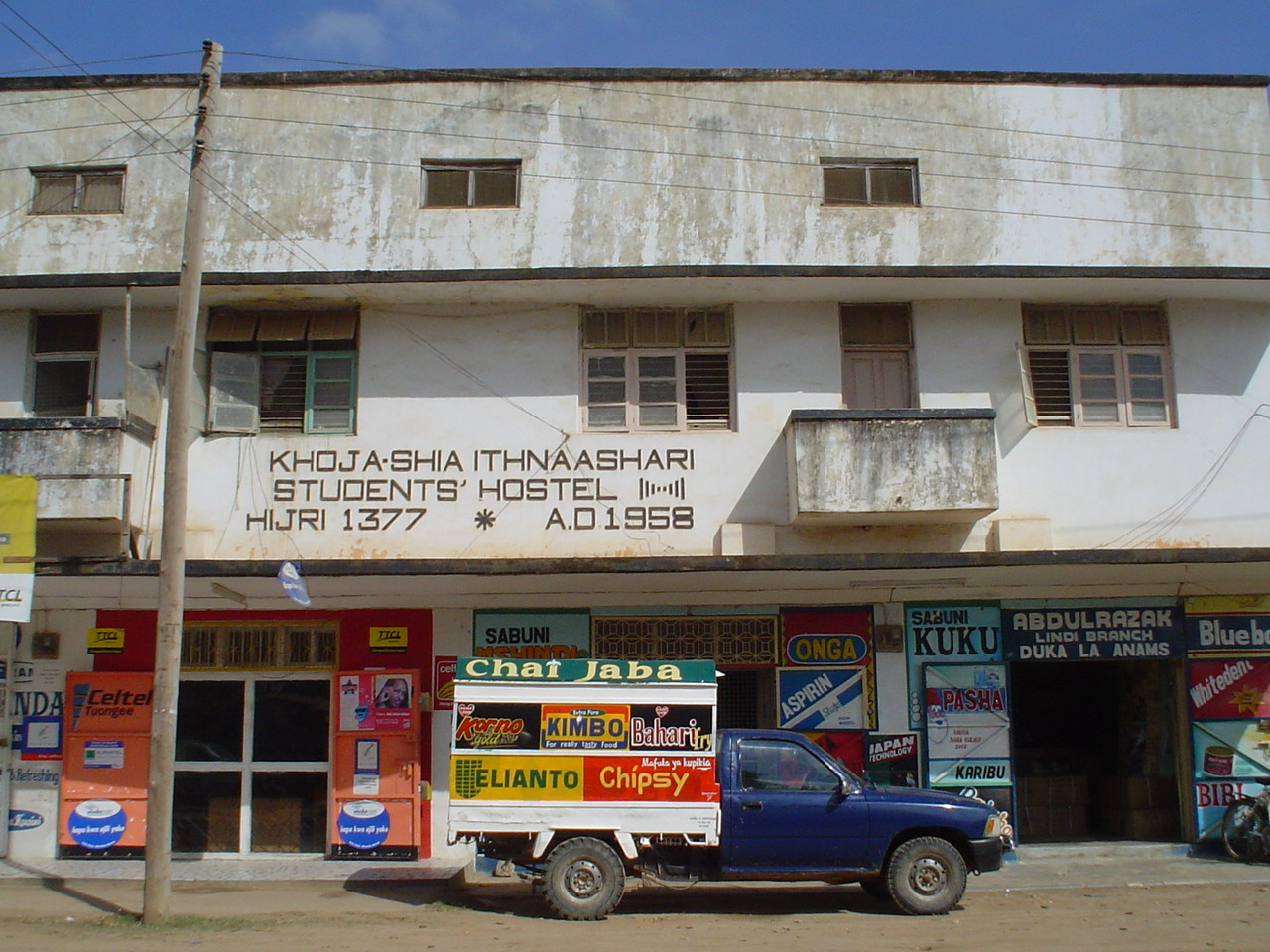
A scene on Lindi's main street with shops and a students' hostel.

Lindi is a historic coastal town in southern Tanzania and the administrative center of the Lindi Region, the least populated region in the country. Situated at the head of Lindi Bay along the Indian Ocean, the town is located approximately 105 kilometers (65 miles) north of Mtwara, the southernmost coastal town in Tanzania, and about 450 kilometers (280 miles) south of Dar es Salaam, the nation's largest city.

The town of Lindi is part of the larger municipality bearing the same name. Notably, Lindi Historic Town is recognized as a national historic site in Tanzania. Additionally, Lindi Airport, located 20 kilometers (12 miles) northeast of the town, providing air connectivity to the region.

== History ==
Lindi was founded in the 11th century. There is no record of a previous name of the Swahili town. In the 17th century, the town was renamed by the Omani Arab colonizers as Lindi meaning "deep channel". The Omanis dominated local people and used the location as a port to sell and transport ivory and slaves to the global market.

With the coming of the German occupation in the 19th century, and later on the British occupation after World War I, the town was the administrative capital of the southern province until 1952 when it was moved to Mtwara City due to its favorable harbor potential in Lindi Bay. In 1971, ten years after independence, the Nyerere administration made Lindi the regional seat for Lindi Region. However, in the following year of 1972, due to a socialist policy, urban councils were abolished in favor of rural development, negatively affecting the economy of the town. However, in 1978, urban councils were reintroduced.

== Economy ==
The main economic activities are fishing, salt production, and the farming of coconut, cashew nuts, and roselles. The 2012 national census reported the town to have a population of 78,841.

== Geography ==
Lindi is located at the mouth of the Lukuledi River. Located on Lindi Bay. Its port facilities are still rudimentary, allowing one or two small cargo and passenger boats at a time, and ocean-going ships cannot be accommodated. The region was once an important area for sisal-producing plantations, especially in Kikwetu, the Lindi airstrip, which lies 25 kilometers north of the town. Around 2012, Lindi was finally linked to Dar es Salaam by a continuous tarmac road, making Lindi accessible throughout the rainy season. An older tarmac road connects Lindi to Mtwara City, passing through Mikindani, an important historic Swahili settlement in Mtwara Region. The Rondo Forest Reserve is an important site of biodiversity which is located at the Rondo Plateau in the southern Lindi Region. Part of a Coastal Forest mosaic, the Rondo Plateau rises sharply from sea level to about 885 metres or 2,900 feet and therefore features a unique microclimate.

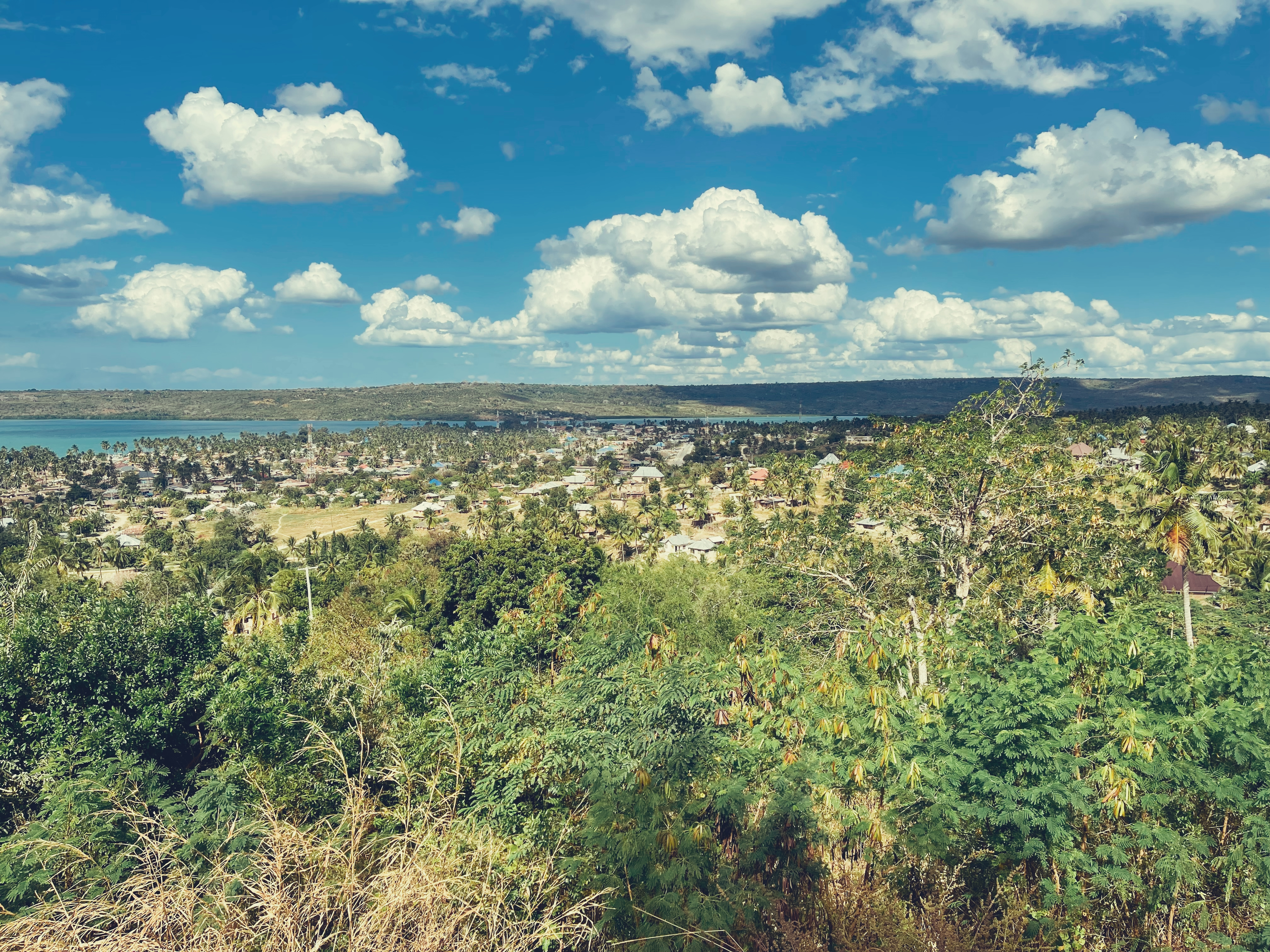
Bird's eye View of Lindi Town

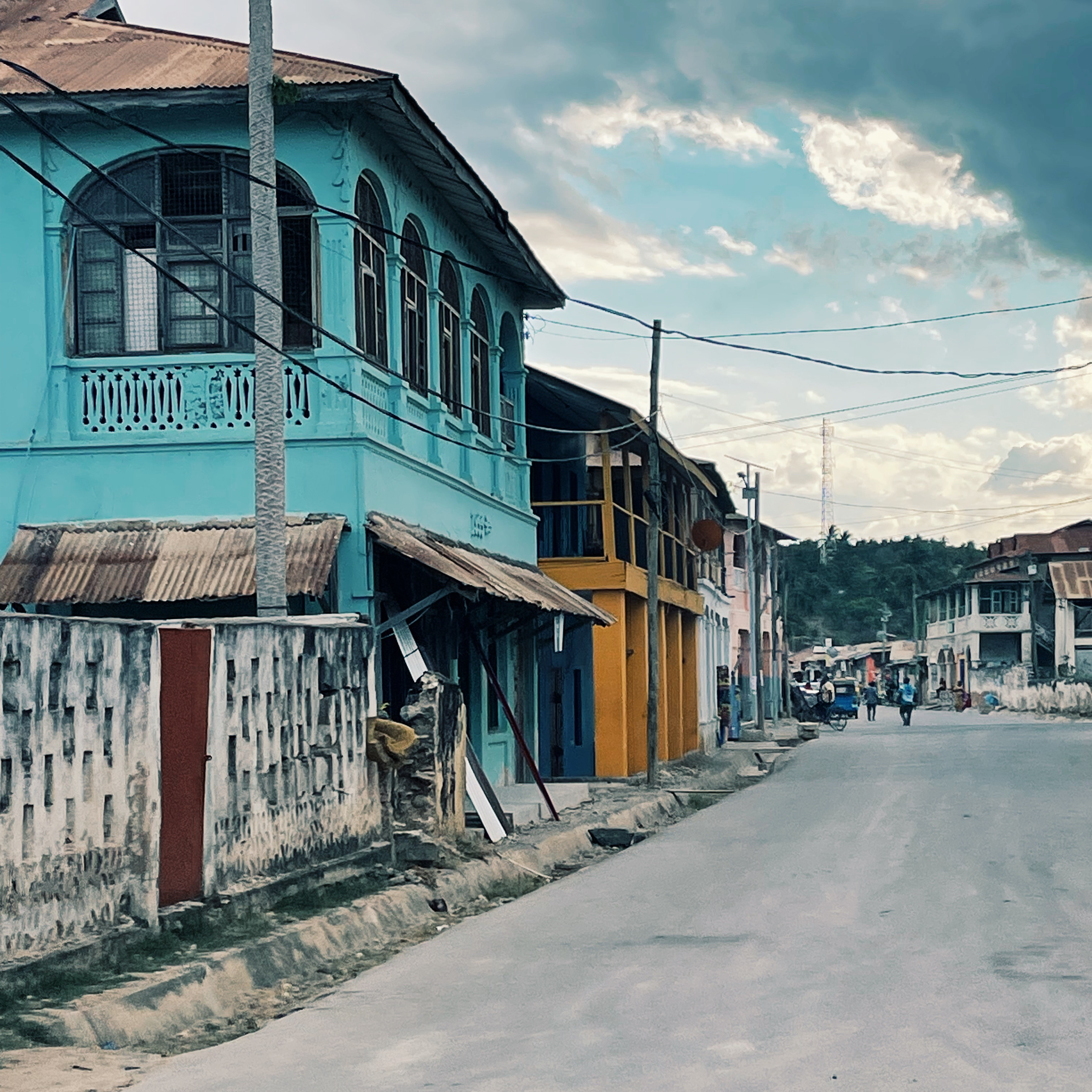
Lindi Town Street Scene

== See also ==
List of Swahili settlements of the East African coast
