= Embassy of Tanzania, Washington, D.C. =

Embassy of Tanzania, D.C.
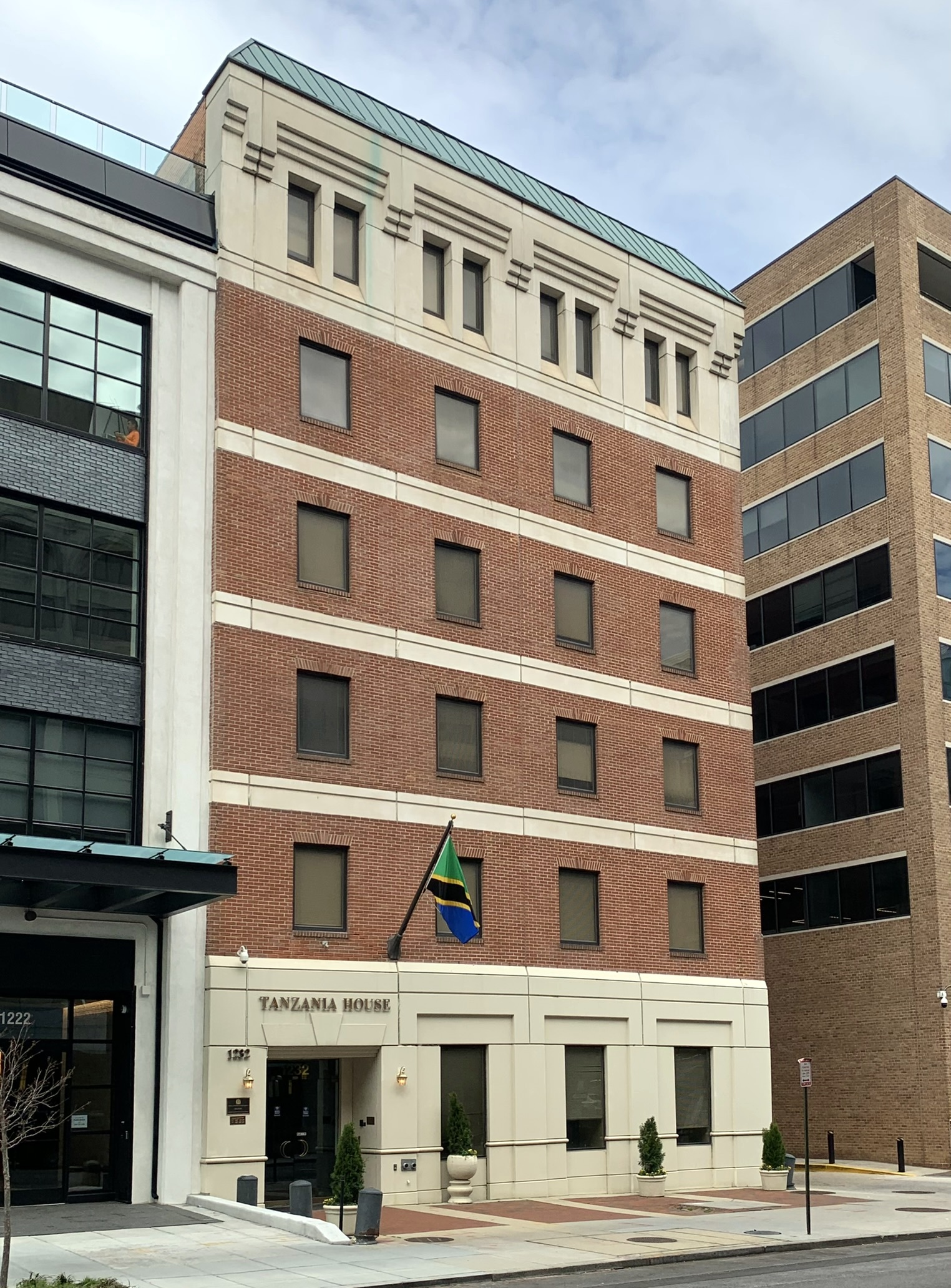
- Location: West End, Washington, D.C.
- Address: 1232 22nd St. N.W.
- Coordinates: 38°54′22″N 77°2′56.7″W
- Website: tanzaniaembassy-us.org

The Embassy of the United Republic of Tanzania in Washington, D.C. is the diplomatic mission of Tanzania in the United States. It is located at 1232 22nd Street NW in the West End neighborhood. The mission is also accredited to Mexico.

== List of Ambassadors ==
The Tanzanian ambassador in Washington, D. C. is the official representative of the Government in Dodoma to the Government of the United States.

| Diplomatic agrément | Diplomatic accreditation | Term end | Ambassador | Observations | Tanzanian Head of State | U.S. President |
|---|---|---|---|---|---|---|
| 1961 | | July 1962 | Vedastus Kyalakishaija Kyaruzi | Permanent Representative of Tanzania to the United Nations | Queen Elizabeth II | John F. Kennedy |
| July 1962 | | December 1962 | Asanterabi Zephaniah Nsilo Swai | Permanent Representative of Tanzania to the United Nations | President Julius Nyerere | John F. Kennedy |
| April 17, 1963 | | 1964 | Erasto Andrew Mbwana Mang'enya | Permanent Representative of Tanzania to the United Nations | President Julius Nyerere | Lyndon B. Johnson |
| November 24, 1964 | December 15, 1964 | February 1965 | Othman Shariff | | President Julius Nyerere | Lyndon B. Johnson |
| November 29, 1965 | December 15, 1965 | | Chief Michael Lukumbuzya | Former principal secretary in the Ministry of Foreign Affairs. Appointed October 6, 1965. | President Julius Nyerere | Lyndon B. Johnson |
| December 31, 1968 | January 3, 1969 | | Gosbert Miarcell Rutabanzibwa | | President Julius Nyerere | Lyndon B. Johnson |
| September 26, 1972 | October 2, 1972 | | Paul Bomani | | President Julius Nyerere | Richard Nixon |
| February 24, 1983 | April 7, 1983 | | Benjamin Mkapa | | President Julius Nyerere | Ronald Reagan |
| October 5, 1984 | December 10, 1989 | | Asterius Magnus Hyera | | President Julius Nyerere | Ronald Reagan |
| May 16, 1990 | May 29, 1995 | | Charles Musama Nyirabu | | President Ali Hassan Mwinyi | George H. W. Bush |
| June 1, 1995 | September 15, 1997 | | Mustafa Salim Nyang’anyi | Born at Kondoa in October 1942, he has had a long career of public and political service after starting as a journalist with Radio Tanzania. | President Benjamin William Mkapa | Bill Clinton |
| July 25, 2002 | July 30, 2002 | | Andrew Mhando Daraja | | President Benjamin William Mkapa | George W. Bush |
| June 15, 2007 | July 25, 2007 | | Ombeni Sefue | | President Jakaya Kikwete | George W. Bush |
| September 7, 2010 | September 16, 2010 | | Mwandaidi Sinare Maajar | | President Jakaya Kikwete | Barack Obama |
| July 17, 2013 | July 18, 2013 | | Liberata Mulamula | | President Jakaya Kikwete | Barack Obama |
| August 29, 2015 | September 17, 2015 | March 17, 2021 | Wilson Masilingi | | President Jakaya Kikwete | Barack Obama |

== See also ==
- Diplomatic missions of Tanzania
