= Powering Potential =

Powering Potential Inc.
- Formation: 2006
- Type: Non-profit
- Headquarters: New York, New York
- Key people: Janice Lathen, Founding Director, President; Albin Mathias, Country Director, Tanzania
- Website: www.poweringpotential.org/

Powering Potential Inc. is a 501(c)(3) non-profit organization that provides public co-ed schools in developing countries with solar-powered computer labs, open source software, offline digital libraries, and training. Its headquarters are located in New York, New York.

== History and Milestones ==
His Excellency Dr. Jakaya Kikwete, President of the United Republic of Tanzania, viewing the Powering Potential exhibit at the annual Education Week in Dodoma, Tanzanian on May 20th, 2015.

American entrepreneur Janice Lathen founded Powering Potential in 2006 after visiting the Banjika Secondary School in Karatu, Tanzania. After introducing herself to the students in Swahili, she was overwhelmed by the students' expression of appreciation.

In December 2010, the US Embassy in Tanzania and Ambassador Alfonso Lenhardt awarded Powering Potential with a grant of 8,600,000 Tsh (~$5,800).

In 2011, Janice Lathen met with Tanzanian Ambassador to the US Mwanaidi Sinare Maajar, Minister of State Stephen Wasira, former Director of Information at the Tanzania Commission for Science and Technology Theophilus E. Mlaki, Tanzanian Minister of Education Shukuru Kawambwa, and the President of Tanzania, Jakaya Mrisho Kikwete.

In 2012, Powering Potential received a grant of 13,517,874 Tsh (~$8,534) from the Tanzanian Rural Energy Agency.

In 2013, Powering Potential presented to the Tanzanian Mission to the UN (Permanent Mission of the United Republic of Tanzanian to the United Nations). Powering Potential received a grant from Tanzanian Postal Bank and the Tanzanian Rural Energy Agency.

In 2014, Powering Potential was invited by Tanzanian Ministry of Education to participate in the country's first Education Week in Dodoma, Tanzania, where they presented their project to the Prime Minister of the United Republic of Tanzania, Mizengo Pinda.

In 2015, Powering Potential received a $56,000 grant from Raspberry Pi Foundation, which was matched by the Segal Family Foundation. In May 2015, Powering Potential took part in Tanzania's second Education Week. Jakaya Kikwete, President of the United Republic of Tanzania at the time, visited the Powering Potential exhibit, saying, "Kazi nzuri! Hii ni tekinolojia tunayohitaji vijijini (Good work! This is the technology which we need for the rural areas)." In November 2015, founder Janice Lathen presented to an audience of 300 at the annual Defrag Technology Conference in Colorado.

In March 2016, Powering Potential celebrated its ten-year anniversary. In October 2016, Powering Potential was invited and unanimously accepted as the first affiliate member of Open Source Initiative operating in Africa.

In 2016, Powering Potential established in Tanzania the Potential Enhancement Foundation, a nongovernment organization, as its independent partner. Local Tanzanians comprise the staff of PEF and are responsible for procuring, installing, and maintaining the equipment. They also design and conduct training sessions for teachers and students, and they monitor and evaluate the success of programs.

In 2017, Powering Potential changed the name of its computer lab program to SPARC (Solar Powered Access to Raspberry Computing).

In 2018, the Tanzanian Ambassador to the United Nations, Modest J. Mero, was the guest of honor and spoke at the Powering Potential fundraiser.

In 2019, Powering Potential launched its award-winning program in the Peruvian Amazon in Iquitos at the San Francisco Rio Itaya School.

In 2020, Powering Potential completed three projects while maintaining Covid protocols.

In 2021, Powering Potential implemented a SPARC project at a secondary school in the Serengeti, and conducted repairs, maintenance and additional training for 16 schools on Zanzibar while maintaining Covid protocols.

In 2022, Powering Potential implemented a SPARC+ project at a secondary school in the Ngorongoro District of Tanzania.

== Awards and Recognitions ==
Powering Potential won the Energy Globe National Award for the best project in Tanzania for its solar-powered computer labs (2017).

PEF, Powering Potential's counterpart organization in Tanzania, was one of three finalists for the Energy Globe World Award in the Youth category (2019).

Wiki.ezvid.com featured Powering Potential as one of "6 Groups Making the Internet a More Accessible Resource" (2020).

O'Reilly featured Powering Potential as hack number 63 in its "Raspberry Pi Hacks" book (2014).

Powering Potential earned the 2022 Platinum Seal of Transparency from Candid (formerly Guidestar).

== Programs ==
Tanzanian students at Mekomariro Secondary School being introduced to their newly-donated Raspberry Pi systems.

- SPARC: Powering Potential's SPARC (Solar-Powered Access to Raspberry Computing) programs install solar-powered Raspberry Pi computer labs with five user computers, RACHEL (Remote Area Community Hotspot for Education and Learning) offline digital libraries including Khan Academy videos from World Possible, the Scratch coding program, office productivity software, Shule Direct digitized Tanzanian syllabi (in Tanzania), and Kolibri Learning Platform from Learning Equality (in the Peruvian Amazon), and they provide training to select rural schools. Each SPARC computer lab serves 10 students.
  - Number of SPARC installations: 14
- SPARC+: The SPARC+ program upgrades the SPARC computer labs. Each SPARC+ computer lab has an expanded solar power system and 20 user computers. With this upgrade, schools in Tanzania can offer the national Information and Computer Studies curriculum. Each SPARC+ computer lab serves 40 students.
  - Number of SPARC+ installations: 10
- Pi-oneer: Powering Potential's Pi-oneer program distributes a Raspberry Pi computer pre-installed with RACHEL offline educational content and Khan Academy media. Includes mobile projector and solar charging unit.
  - Number of Pi-oneer installations: 30
- Training Workshops: Powering Potential provides a three-week training program for teachers and students with every installation of a SPARC computer lab, and it also hosts workshops on topics such as coding.
  - Number of training workshops conducted: 42

== Impact ==
Powering Potential has seen significant expansion since its inception in 2006. The organization has achieved the following:

- 103 projects in 34 schools in 34 towns on two continents
- 34,000+ teachers and students impacted
- 60% of respondents report continuing their education
- 58% of respondents report securing employment because of their technology skills
- 3,000+ students enrolled in Tanzanian national ICT courses for secondary schools
