= Chester Crocker =

American diplomat (born 1941)

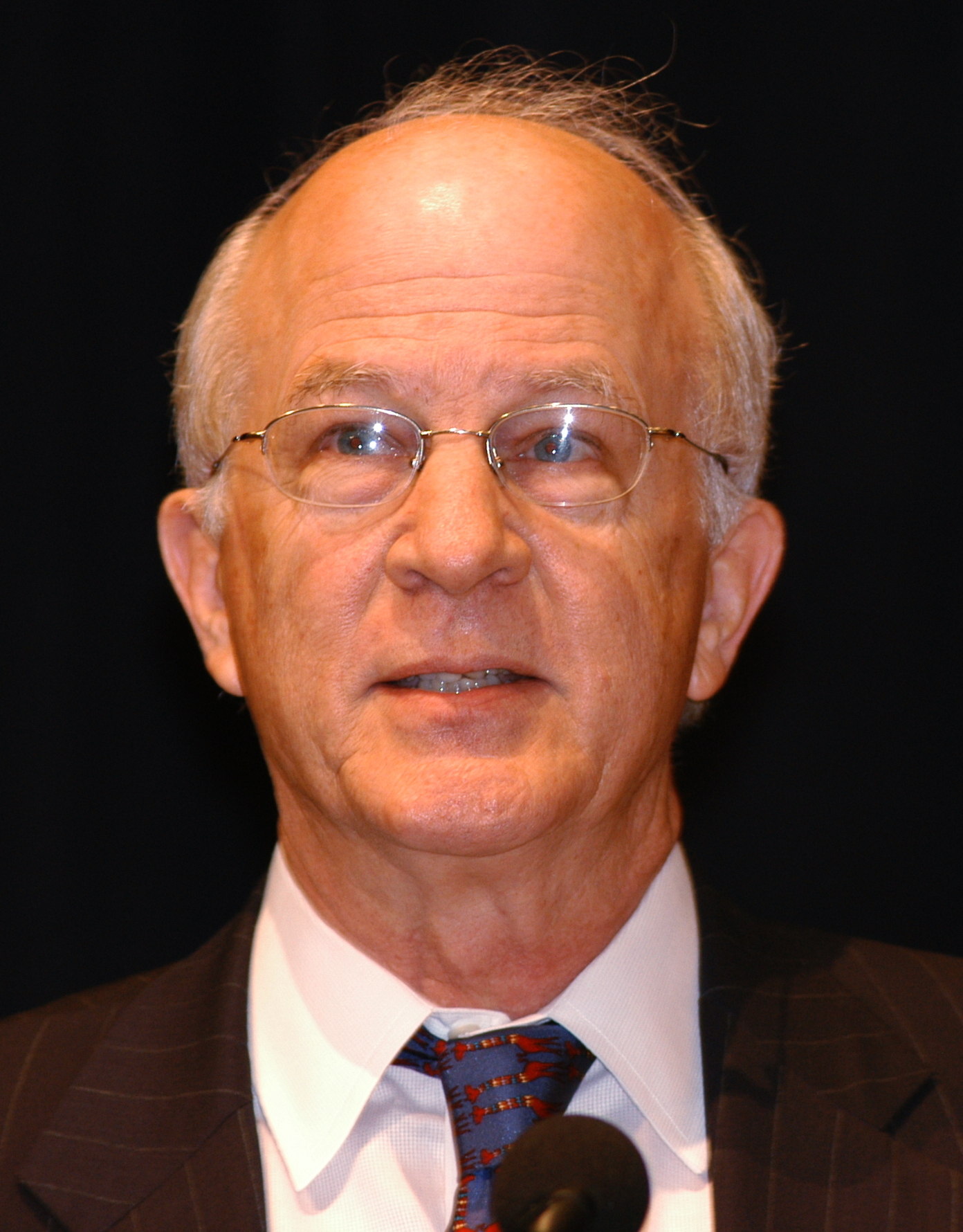
- Crocker in 2006

9th Assistant Secretary of State for African Affairs
- In office June 9, 1981 – April 21, 1989
- President: Ronald Reagan; George H. W. Bush
- Preceded by: Richard M. Moose
- Succeeded by: Herman Jay Cohen

Personal details
- Born: October 29, 1941 (age 84) New York City, New York, U.S.
- Party: Republican
- Children: Bathsheba Crocker
- Occupation: Diplomat

Chester Arthur Crocker (born October 29, 1941) is an American diplomat and scholar who served as Assistant Secretary of State for African Affairs from June 9, 1981, to April 21, 1989, in the Reagan administration. Crocker, architect of the U.S. policy of "constructive engagement" towards Southern Africa including apartheid-era South Africa, is credited with setting the terms of Namibian independence.

== Background ==
Crocker was born in New York City in 1941. He attended Ohio State University and graduated with distinction in history in 1963. He obtained a master's degree at Johns Hopkins University in 1965, followed by a Ph.D. at the School of Advanced International Studies. From 1969 to 1970, Crocker was a lecturer in African government and politics at the American University in Washington, D.C. He was recruited to join the National Security Council by Henry Kissinger in 1970, but returned to academia in 1972 as director of the Master of Science in Foreign Service program at Georgetown University, where he lectured in African politics and international relations. Over the course of the next nine years, Crocker advanced to assistant professor, and finally became associate professor at Georgetown University.

== Constructive engagement ==
As chairman of Ronald Reagan's 1980 presidential election campaign's "Africa working group", Crocker sought to change US policy on apartheid South Africa away from what he saw as the confrontational approach adopted by the Carter presidency and towards a new policy which he termed "constructive engagement." Shortly after the election, Crocker attracted the attention of the Reagan transition team with an article he wrote in the winter 1980/81 edition of the Foreign Affairs journal. In the article, Crocker was highly critical of the outgoing Carter administration for its apparent hostility to the white minority government in South Africa, by acquiescing in the United Nations Security Council's imposition of a mandatory arms embargo (UNSCR 418/77) and the UN's demand for the end of South Africa's illegal occupation of Namibia (UNSCR 435/78). Crocker's policy linked the removal of South African forces from Namibia with the removal of Cuban forces from Angola, which many U.S. diplomats considered to be of vital importance. Without Cuban withdrawal, it was deemed unlikely by diplomats that South Africa would see an incentive to begin the removal of its own troops from Namibia. It was hoped that Cuba would view the withdrawal of its troops as a successful conclusion to their efforts in Africa as it would confirm Cuba's role as a significant player on the diplomatic stage. Crocker conceived constructive engagement as a strategy toward the entire region of southern Africa, and was premised on working with those governments and parties that were prepared to work with Washington to resolve regional problems.

In addition to the focus on Namibia/Angola, he worked to reduce civil strife in Mozambique. This included overseeing the Nkomati Accord, encouraging the FRELIMO government to move towards the West and highlighting RENAMO's human rights abuses during the Mozambican civil war. In 1987-1988, Crocker alerted senior U.S. government officials to these abuses through reporting by Robert Gersony.

On February 7, 1981, Crocker formally proposed that the United States should link Namibian independence to the withdrawal of Cuban troops from Angola, where they had formed a 700 km defensive line to prevent South African assaults similar to the 'Zulu' invasion of 1975. In April 1981, Assistant Secretary of State-designate Crocker was dispatched to Africa on a two-week, eleven-nation tour to lay the groundwork for the new policy. However, Crocker was met with distrust on one side – the black leaders wary of the Reagan administration's friendly approach towards the white-minority government in South Africa – and hostility from the other, with prime minister P. W. Botha refusing to meet with him. Undeterred, Crocker continued to insist that a comprehensive solution was the only way to allay the fears on both sides. In his testimony before the House Foreign Affairs Subcommittee on February 15, 1983, he argued:

Security, of which the Cuban troop issue is an integral part, has always been a prerequisite for agreement on Namibian independence. As a practical diplomatic matter, it will not be possible to obtain a Namibian independence agreement without satisfactory regional security assurances.

Resolution 435 already required South Africa to leave Namibia so the incorporation of Cuba and Angola was deemed unnecessary in the eyes of some. The policy's requirement to cooperate with the South African government was viewed unfavorably by politicians and human rights organizations on account of the implicit condoning of apartheid. Author/journalist Christopher Hitchens gives credit for the independence agreement to the South-West Africa People's Organization, rather than to constructive engagement. However, UN diplomat Martti Ahtisaari contended that "South Africa had not the least intention of relinquishing Namibia." Crocker's analysis of the situation from the perspective of the South African government concluded that this delay would never be overcome unless the South Africans felt that the execution of resolution 435 offered them an incentive.

In spite of such criticisms and the initial distrust among black African leaders, Crocker persevered in his pursuit of a negotiated settlement for the related conflicts in Angola and Namibia. Crocker was assisted by his chief deputy, Frank G. Wisner, who had been the U.S. ambassador to Zambia between August 1979 and April 1982. Vernon Walters, an ambassador-at-large, played a secondary role conducting a tour of southern African capitals with Wisner during the course of June 1982. Crocker managed to gain the trust of Kenneth Kaunda, the Zambian president. Kaunda visited the White House for talks with Ronald Reagan in March 1983, and agreed to host an international conference in February 1984 which resulted in the Lusaka Accords, a small but significant step forward in the search for peace in southern Africa.

== Relaxing the arms embargo ==
On April 3, 1984, Richard Knight of the American Committee on Africa reported to the United Nations Special Committee against Apartheid on the effects the new policy was having:

The Reagan administration's policy of constructive engagement has already led to a significant relaxation of the arms embargo. Stressing the goal of regional stability, the American government has now adopted a policy which they see as an 'even-handed' approach to all countries in the region. Thus the Reagan administration seeks to blame all sides equally for the violence in the region, ignoring the fact that the violence stems from apartheid. In reality there is no even-handedness in the US's engagement in southern Africa: a policy which in the last three years has resulted in an increased South African ability to harass and dominate regionally. A study of the easing of the arms embargo reveals that more than $28.3 million worth of military equipment was authorised for sale to South Africa for fiscal years 1981-1984, as compared to $25,000 for 1979.

While the FNLA and UNITA were funded by South Africa and the U.S., the Soviet Union had provided billions of dollars in military support for the MPLA, which was identified as a socialist group. By the end of the 1970s, Angola had become the focus of the USSR's African policy.

== Namibian independence ==
Crocker intensified his mediation efforts in successive years. In May 1988 he headed a U.S. mediation team which brought negotiators from Angola, Cuba and South Africa, and observers from the Soviet Union together in London. Intense diplomatic maneuvering characterized the next seven months so as to implement United Nations Security Council Resolution 435 and secure Namibian independence. At the Reagan/Gorbachev summit in Moscow (May 29-June 1, 1988), the regional conflicts in Central America, Afghanistan, and Southern Africa, where the mediation effort was headed by Crocker, were discussed and ongoing negotiations received encouragement.. While an agreement was not reached, Crocker and Anatoly Adamishin, a Soviet Deputy Foreign Minister, set 29 September as a target date for resolving outstanding differences on a settlement leading to withdrawal of Cuban troops from Angola, and independence for South-West Africa. The Tripartite Accord, which gave effect to these decisions, were signed at UN headquarters in New York on December 22, 1988. Crocker attended the signing ceremony along with George Shultz. UNSR Martti Ahtisaari took over from Crocker in April 1989 and began the implementation of UNSCR 435.

In May 1989 Crocker stepped down as Assistant Secretary of State and returned to academia at Georgetown University's School of Foreign Service.

Elections were held from the 7–11 November 1989 and Namibia finally achieved independence from South Africa on 21 March 1990.

Chas. W. Freeman Jr commented at the time that "the emergence of Namibia as a stable, decent society with a well-managed economy would inspire more rapid change away from apartheid in South Africa." He later commented in a 1995 interview with Charles Stuart Kennedy for the Association for Diplomatic Studies and Training that "there is no doubt that the South African opening to the outside world, which Crocker's diplomacy ultimately brokered and which produced the Cuban troop withdrawal from Angola and the Namibian independence in 1989, was a fundamental factor in impelling P. W. Botha's successor, F. W. De Klerk, in the direction of releasing Mandela and opening the political process to black South African participation."

Martti Ahtisaari was also of the opinion that the policy of constructive engagement acted as an undeniable catalyst for resolution. He remarked that "those of us close to the matter were aware that if nothing new was put forward we would remain in this situation for the rest of our lives. But we couldn't declare publicly that this was an excellent idea – although in the final analysis it was a bold and adroit move by Crocker." The Washington Post editors opined that constructive engagement "was a comprehensive policy for dealing with all of southern Africa" and considered that the December 1988 accords had "established the U.S. as the arbiter of peace in a racially torn, politically important region". Former diplomat and Carter Administration domestic policy advisor Stuart Eizenstat concluded that Crocker's "policy of constructive engagement and applying "carrots and sticks" by linking the withdrawal of South Africa from Namibia and Cuban troops from Angola played a major role in ending the conflict".

== Notable positions held ==
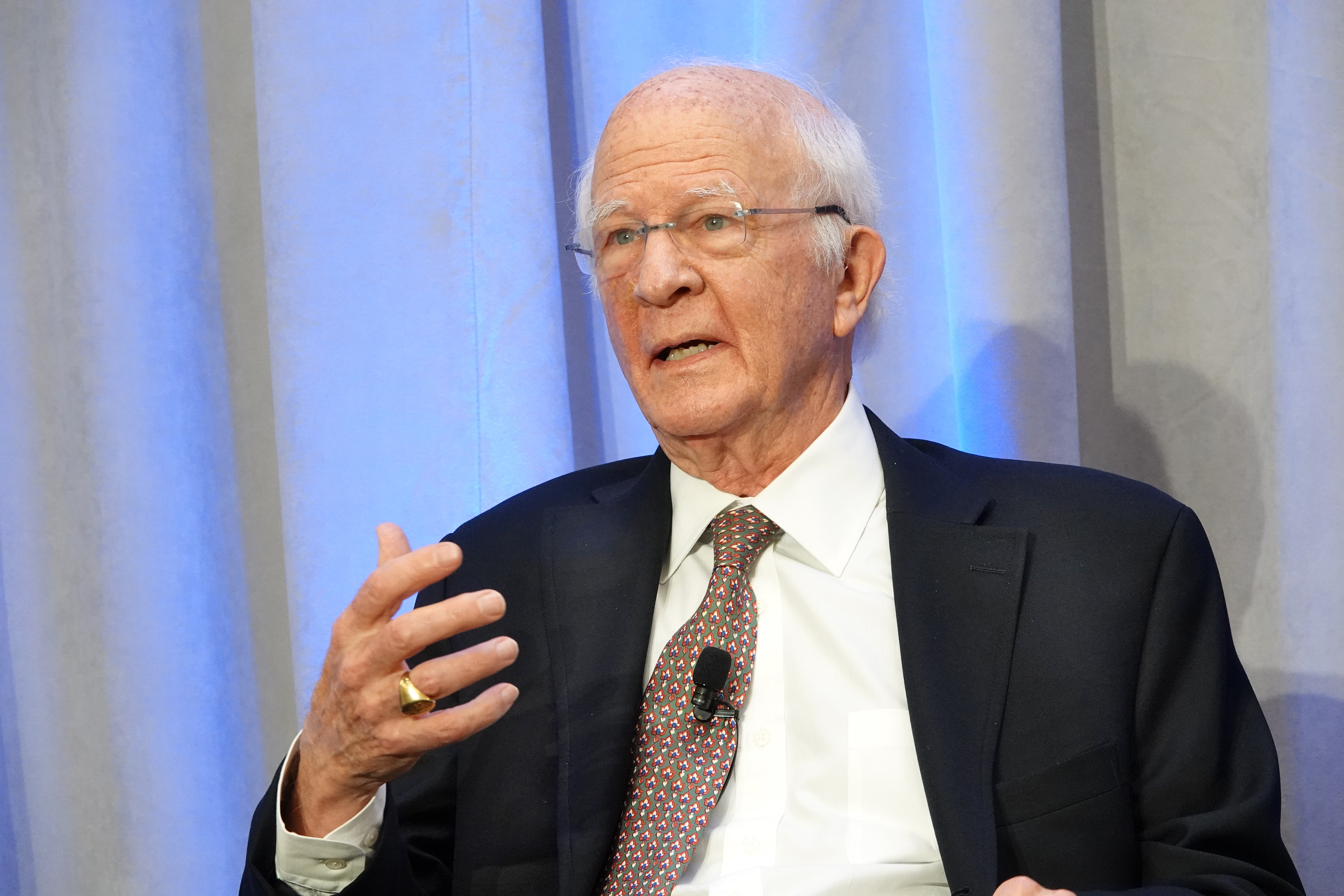
Crocker in 2023

From 1969 to 1970 Crocker was professional lecturer in African government and politics at the American University, before he left to join the Kissinger National Security Council staff. He returned to academia in 1972, as director of the Master of Science in Foreign Service program at Georgetown University, a position he held until 1978. He concurrently served as director of African studies at the Center for Strategic and International Studies (1976–80). Crocker became the James R. Schlesinger Professor in the Practice of Strategic Studies at Georgetown University. He also serves as Schlesinger fellow in strategic studies at the School's Institute for the Study of Diplomacy.

Other notable positions held include service at the United States Institute of Peace, which supports research, education and training, as well as operating programs in conflict zones. He held the position of chairman of the board from 1992 to 2004, after which Crocker continued on as a board member until 2011.

He is also a member of the Global Leadership Foundation, an independent, non-profit organisation which lends the expertise of established diplomats and world leaders to current governments. From May 2014 Crocker acted as a distinguished fellow with CIGI's Global Security & Politics Program, leading a project that examined Africa's regional conflict management strategy.

In addition to these, Crocker sat on the board of directors of the International Peace and Security Institute, which offered intensive education and training to young professionals from world leaders in an effort to promote peaceful diplomacy. On September 18 2008, Crocker was appointed to the World Bank's new Independent Advisory Board (IAB).

In 2020, Crocker, along with over 130 other former Republican national security officials, signed a statement that asserted that President Trump was unfit to serve another term, and "To that end, we are firmly convinced that it is in the best interest of our nation that Vice President Joe Biden be elected as the next President of the United States, and we will vote for him."

== Personal and family life ==
Crocker married Saone Baron with whom he had three daughters including Bathsheba Crocker. After her death he married Pamela Aall, with whom he has written several books.

== Awards ==
In 1989, Ronald Reagan awarded Crocker with the Presidential Citizen's Medal.

In 1992, Crocker was awarded an honorary doctorate from Rhodes University.

On September 18, 2008, Crocker was appointed to the World Bank's new Independent Advisory Board, (IAB), which will provide advice on anti-corruption measures.

== List of affiliations ==
- G3 Good Governance Group – group executive chairman
- Global Leadership Foundation – founder and board member
- International Peace and Security Institute, board of directors
- U.S. Institute of Peace – board of directors
- Georgetown University School of Foreign Service – James R. Schlesinger Professor in the Practice of Strategic Studies
- Center for International Governance Innovation – Distinguished Fellow
- Universal Corporation, Inc – board member
- Ngena Foundation – board member
- International advisory board, international affairs (Chatham House) – member
- Council on Foreign Relations – member
- International Institute of Strategic Studies – member
- American Academy of Diplomacy – member

== List of published works ==
- Chester Crocker, High Noon in Southern Africa: Making Peace in a Rough Neighborhood. New York, NY: W. W. Norton, 1992.
- Chester Crocker and David Smock, African Conflict Resolution: The U.S. Role. Washington, DC: U.S. Institute of Peace, 1995.
- Chester Crocker and Fen Osler Hampson, Managing Global Chaos: Origins of and Responses to International Conflict. Washington, DC: U.S. Institute of Peace, 1996.
- Chester Crocker, Fen Osler Hampson and Pamela Aall, Herding Cats: Multiparty Mediation in a Complex World. Washington, DC: U.S. Institute of Peace, 1999.
- Chester Crocker, Fen Osler Hampson and Pamela Aall, Turbulent Peace: The Challenges of Managing International Conflict. Washington, DC: U.S. Institute of Peace Press, 2001.
- Chester Crocker, Fen Osler Hampson and Pamela Aall, Taming Intractable Conflicts: Mediation in the Hardest Cases. Washington, DC: U.S. Institute of Peace Press, 2004.
- Chester Crocker, Fen Osler Hampson and Pamela Aall, Grasping the Nettle: Analyzing Cases of Intractable Conflict. Washington, D.C.: United States Institute of Peace, 2005.
- Chester A Crocker, Fen Osler Hampson, and Pamela Aall, ed. Leashing the Dogs of War: Conflict Management in a Divided World. Washington D.C.: United States Institute of Peace, 2007.
- Chester Crocker, Casimir Yost, and Thomas Pickering, America's Role in the World: Foreign Policy Choices for the Next Administration. Washington D.C.: Institute for the Study of Diplomacy, 2008.
- Chester Crocker, Fen Osler Hampson, and Pamela Aall, Rewiring Regional Security in a Fragmented World. Washington, DC: U.S. Institute of Peace Press, 2010.
- Chester A. Crocker, Fen Osler Hampson and Pamela Aall (ed.), Managing Conflict in a World Adrift (2015)
- Chester A. Crocker and Pamela Aall, ed. Minding the Gap: African Conflict Management in a Time of Change. Canada: Centre for International Governance Innovation, 2016.
