= Tuvako Manongi =

Tanzanian diplomat

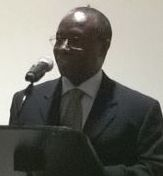

14th Permanent Representative of Tanzania to the United Nations
- In office 19 September 2012 – March 2017
- Appointed by: Jakaya Kikwete
- Preceded by: Ombeni Sefue
- Succeeded by: Modest Mero

Personal details
- Born: Same District
- Children: 4
- Education: University of Dar es Salaam; Centre for Foreign Relations

Tuvako Nathaniel Manongi is a Tanzanian diplomat who has served as the Permanent Representative of Tanzania to the United Nations since 19 September 2012.
