= Hoyce Temu =

Tanzanian diplomat and journalist

Hoyce Anderson Temu
- Born: March 20, 1978 (age 47); Mount Meru Hospital, Arusha, Tanzania
- Education: Arusha Secondary School (O-Level); Zanaki High School (A-Level)
- Alma mater: Arizona State University (BA); Centre for Foreign Relations (PGDip in Diplomacy); St. Augustine University of Tanzania (MA, PhD)
- Occupations: Diplomat; Journalist; Public relations professional; Beauty queen
- Years active: 1996–present
- Title: Deputy Head of Mission; Tanzanian Embassy in Geneva, Switzerland

Hoyce Anderson Temu (born 20 March 1978) is a Tanzanian diplomat, journalist, public relations professional and former beauty queen, who was appointed as the deputy head of mission at Tanzania's Embassy in Geneva, Switzerland, on 23 May 2021. She took up her position in August 2021.

== Early life and education ==
Temu was born in March 1978 at Mount Meru Hospital in the city of Arusha in the Arusha Region of northeastern Tanzania. She attended Arusha Primary School and Arusha Secondary School. She is reported to have excelled there. She then transferred to Zanaki High School in Dar es Salaam.

She was admitted to Arizona State University in the United States, where she graduated with a Bachelor of Arts degree in public relations. She returned to Tanzania and graduated with a Postgraduate Diploma in Diplomatic Relations from the Centre for Foreign Relations in Dar es Salaam.

She also holds a Master of Arts degree in Mass Communication, awarded by St. Augustine University of Tanzania (SAUT), in Mwanza, along the shores of Lake Victoria. As of 2021, she was pursuing a Doctor of Philosophy (PhD) in Mass Communication from SAUT as well.

== Career ==
At the time she was appointed ambassador in 2021, she had professional experience of 15 years going back to 1996, in public relations, journalism and communication. Past employers include Standard Chartered Bank, the United Nations and the Government of Tanzania. She served as the Public Relations Officer at the Food and Agriculture Organization (FAO), in Tanzania in 1999. She then served for the next three years as Secretary of the Telefood Committee whose Patron was the former president of Tanzania, the late Benjamin Mkapa and the Matron was the former First Lady Anna Mkapa. Temu also served as television presenter in that time period.

== Miss Tanzania ==
In 1999, Hoyce Temu then aged 21, participated in the Miss Tanzania beauty contest as a contestant. She won and went on to participate in the Miss World contest held in the United Kingdom later that year. She did not win there and was persuaded to go back to university by her friend and mentor, Angellah Jasmine Kairuki, the current Minister of Tourism and Natural Resources in Cabinet of Tanzania.

== Philanthropy ==
Leveraging her fame as beauty queen, her journalism training and her public relations experience, Temu launched a television program, where she showcased her work helping Tanzanian adults and children find solutions to their problems including education, health and economic issues. Sometimes she used her own money, sometimes donations and other times corporate scholarships. The TV program was called "Me and Tanzania" (Swahili: "Mimi na Tanzania").

== Ambassador ==
In May she was appointed ambassador by President Samia Suluhu Hassan, the President of Tanzania. She was sworn in on 27 July 2021 and assumed her position as the deputy head of mission at Tanzania's Embassy in Geneva, accredited to Switzerland, Austria and the offices of the United Nations based in Geneva.

== Personal life ==
Ambassador Hoyce Temu is a married mother.
