= Maryam Msabaha =

Tanzanian politician

Honorable Maryam Msabaha MP

Member of Parliament Special Seats
- In office 2015–2020

Personal details
- Born: 12 May 1971 (age 55) Kilimanjaro Region, Tanzania
- Party: CHADEMA
- Education: Kindikati Primary School, Arusha Secondary School
- Alma mater: Open University of Tanzania BA

Maryam Salum Msabaha (born 12 May 1971) is a Tanzanian CHADEMA politician and Member of Parliament representative for women special seats from 2015 to 2020.
