= Erasto =

Erasto is a given name common in Tanzania, Mexico and the Caribbean. Notable people with the name include:

- Atiba Erasto Harris, Kittitian football administrator and former professional footballer.
- Erasto Andrew Mbwana Mang'enya, Tanzanian diplomat
- Erasto B. Mpemba, Tanzanian game warden
- Erasto Cortés Juárez, Mexican artist
- Erasto Nyoni, Tanzanian footballer
- Erasto Sampson, sprinter
- Martín Erasto Torrijos, 35th president of Panama
- Raúl Erasto Gutiérrez, Mexican professional football manager and former player
