= David Crane (lawyer) =

American lawyer

David M. Crane
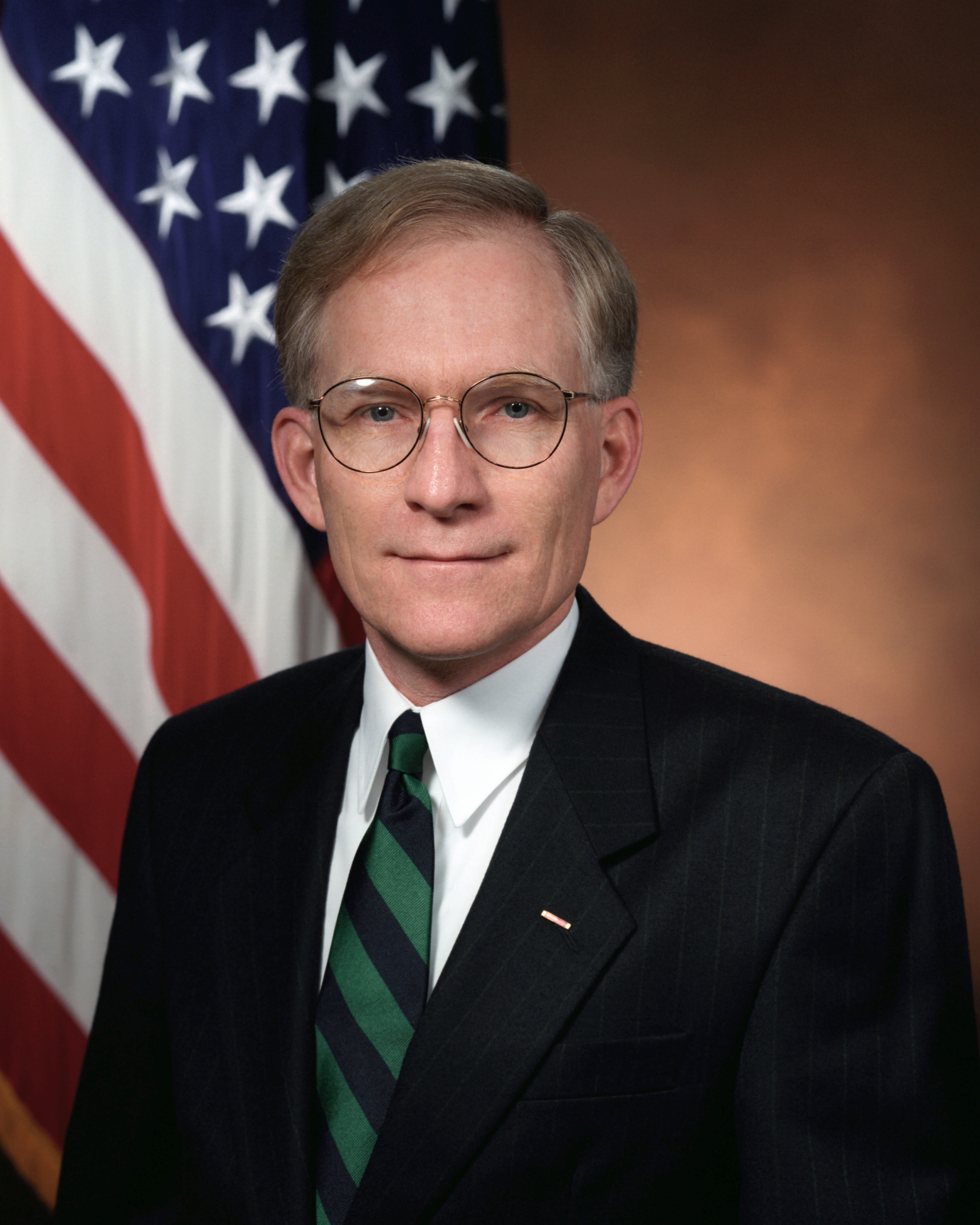
- Crane in January 1999
- Born: May 29, 1950 (age 76); Santa Monica, California
- Education: Ohio University; Syracuse University
- Occupation: Lawyer

David Michael Crane (born May 29, 1950) is an American lawyer who was the Chief Prosecutor of the Special Court for Sierra Leone (SCSL) from April 2002 until July 15, 2005. During his tenure, he indicted, among others, the then-President of Liberia, Charles Taylor. Crane was replaced as chief prosecutor by his deputy Desmond de Silva. On April 26, 2012, the SCSL, sitting in The Hague, convicted Taylor on various charges. Crane served as Professor of Practice at Syracuse University College of Law from 2006 until 2018.

== Early life and education ==
Born in Santa Monica, California, Crane attended Ohio University, earning a Bachelor of General Studies degree in history in 1972 and an M.A. in African Studies in 1973. Commissioned as an Army officer after graduation, he trained to be a paratrooper. His time as an officer included a stint as a platoon leader in the 101st Airborne Division during the Vietnam War. While still on active duty, he earned a J.D. degree from Syracuse University College of Law in 1980 and joined the Judge Advocate General's Corps.

== Career ==
Crane served on active duty in the Army for over twenty years, retiring as a lieutenant colonel. He then spent about ten more years working for the United States federal government. His former posts include Director of the Office of Intelligence Review, assistant general counsel of the Defense Intelligence Agency and the Waldemar A. Solf Professor of International Law at the United States Army Judge Advocate General's School.

Crane served as Professor of Practice at Syracuse University College of Law from 2006 until 2018. He taught international criminal law, international law, national security law, and the law of armed conflict.

In conjunction with Syracuse University College of Law students, Crane started Impunity Watch, an online publication which seeks to inform the world of human rights violations in real-time. Another Syracuse University College of Law project is the Syria Accountability Project (SAP). SAP was begun in 2011 as a project of Crane's International Legal Practice course at SU Law and now involves 50 SU law students. SAP works collectively with several international organizations to provide impartial analysis of open source materials so that President Bashar al-Assad and his subordinates—as well as members of the Syrian opposition—can be prosecuted openly and fairly under the Geneva Conventions, the Rome Statute, and/or Syrian Penal Law.

Following his time as founding Chief Prosecutor of the Special Court for Sierra Leone, Crane and his fellow prosecutors DeSilva and Brenda Hollis traveled to The Hague, Netherlands on September 26, 2013, to witness the upholding of Taylor's 50-year sentence by the special court's appeals judges. On October 29, 2013, Crane testified in front of the U.S. House of Representatives Committee on Foreign Affairs Subcommittee on Africa, Global Health, Global Human Rights, and International Organizations about the possible establishment of a Syrian War Crimes Tribunal. He later co-authored the 2014 Syrian detainee report.

In July 2018, the United Nations Human Rights Council appointed Crane to co-chair (alongside Sara Hossain and Kaari Betty Murungi) a three-person Commission of Inquiry into the killing of at least 140 Palestinians by the Israeli army. Only one month later, he resigned "due to a personal circumstance that has arisen."

He is currently a member of the Crimes Against Humanity Initiative Advisory Council, a project of the Whitney R. Harris World Law Institute at Washington University School of Law in St. Louis to establish the world's first treaty on the prevention and punishment of crimes against humanity.

In 2017, Crane founded the Global Accountability Network to investigate international crimes in Syria, Yemen, Venezuela, and China. In 2022, the organization published a white paper titled "Russian War Crimes Against Ukraine: The Breach of International Humanitarian Law By The Russian Federation".

== Other activities ==
- Robert H. Jackson Center, chairman of the Board (2012–2015), Board Director (2012-present)
- International Peace and Security Institute, Member of the Board of Directors

== Publications ==
- Every Living Thing: Facing Down Terrorists, Warlords, and Thugs in West Africa—A Story of Justice. Durham, North Carolina: Carolina Academic Press. 2020. ISBN 978-1-5310-1621-0.

== Awards ==
Crane is a recipient of the Legion of Merit and the Defense Distinguished Civilian Service Medal. He was awarded an honorary Doctor of Laws degree by Case Western Reserve University in May 2008. His alma mater Ohio University conferred an honorary Doctor of Letters degree in April 2017.
