= Kundo Mathew =

Tanzanian politician

Honorable Kundo Mathew MP

Deputy Minister for Information, Communication and information Technology
- Incumbent
- Assumed office December 2020
- President: John Magufuli; Samia Suluhu
- Preceded by: office established

Member of Parliament
- Incumbent
- Assumed office November 2020
- Preceded by: Andrew Chenge
- Constituency: Bariadi Constituency

Personal details
- Born: Kundo Andrea Mathew Shinyanga Region
- Party: Chama Cha Mapinduzi
- Education: St.Anthony's High School
- Alma mater: Centre for Foreign Relations; Hunan University; Coventry University; Open University of Tanzania
- Occupation: Civil Servant
- Profession: Engineer

Kundo Mathew, also known as Kundo Andrea Mathew, is a Tanzanian politician and former Deputy Minister for Information, Communication and information Technology and presently serving as the Chama Cha Mapinduzi's member of parliament for Shinyanga Urban constituency since November 2020. He is currently the Deputy Minister for Water in Tanzania.

== Education ==
Kundo Mathew pursued higher education in information technology, project management, and international relations in Tanzania, China, and the United Kingdom.

He obtained a Bachelor of Engineering in Computer Technology from Hunan University (2004–2009). He later completed a Postgraduate Diploma in Management of Foreign Relations at the Centre for Foreign Relations (2015–2016).

Mathew earned two master’s degrees: a Master’s degree in Information Management from Coventry University (2011–2012) and a Master’s degree in Project Monitoring and Evaluation from the Open University of Tanzania (2015–2017).

For his secondary education, he attended Tabora Boys Secondary School, where he completed the Certificate of Secondary Education Examination (CSEE) (1997–2000), and later studied at St. Anthony's High School, completing the Advanced Certificate of Secondary Education (ACSE) (2001–2003).

== Career ==
Kundo Mathew has worked in information systems, communications, and public administration across the private sector, international organizations, and the Tanzanian government.

From 2004 to 2008, he served as a Systems and Communication Coordinator at Web International China, where he was involved in systems coordination and communications support.

Between 2009 and 2010, he worked as an Assistant Operations Manager at Yongshun Construction Co. Ltd.

From 2010 to 2014, Mathew was employed as a Systems Analyst and Operational Officer with the United Nations High Commissioner for Refugees (UNHCR), where he worked on information systems and operational support.

He later served as a Systems Analyst at the Ministry of Home Affairs from 2014 to 2020, contributing to the management and analysis of government information systems. Kundo believes Tanzanian youth should embrace digital and information technology to discover solutions for social change and become assets to the country.

He works as the Deputy Minister of Water, addressing water challenges in Tanzania while visiting different regions. In 2026, he revealed that the government had completed 3,714 water projects, with 778 projects still being implemented, reassuring the public of his hard work in the current administration.
