= IPSI =

IPSI may refer to:

- International Peace and Security Institute
- Ipsilateral, an anatomical term of location
- Irish Progressive Services International
