= International Peace and Security Institute =

Nonprofit organization

International Peace and Security Institute (IPSI)
- Formation: 2009
- Type: International nonprofit organization education and training
- Headquarters: Washington, D.C., United States
- Location: Washington, D.C.
- Official language: English
- Executive Director: Cameron M. Chisholm
- Key people: Dr.I. William Zartman, Dr. Terrence Hopmann, George Foote, Alex Little, Kevin Melton, William Stuebner
- Website: www.ipsinstitute.org

The International Peace and Security Institute or IPSI is a division of Creative Learning an international nonprofit organization with 501(c)(3) status headquartered in Washington, D.C. Founded in 2009, IPSI was acquired by Creative Learning in November 2016. The Institute's objective is to train young peacebuilding and International Justice leaders in the skills needed to effectively intervene in violent conflict scenarios in pursuit of sustainable peace.

Currently IPSI has two flagship symposiums in Bologna, Italy, and The Hague, The Netherlands. Between 2009 and 2014 more than 400 young professionals and practitioners from over 100 countries have received training from the Institute.

== Programs ==
=== Bologna Symposium on Conflict Prevention, Resolution, & Reconciliation ===
Since 2010 and in cooperation with Johns Hopkins University SAIS, IPSI hosts a 4-week symposium in Italy, each year attended by more than 50 young professionals. Participants learn directly from world leaders, and undergo training from experts, notable academics, and advocates.

=== The Hague Symposium on Post-Conflict Transitions and International Justice ===
In partnership with the Netherlands Institute of International Relations Clingendael, this symposium brings together young leaders in the fields of international law, Human Rights, international relations, and the military, to participate in a month-long training on restorative justice, post conflict development and security, reconciliation, among other topics.

Panelists and speakers in this symposium have included:

- ICC Chief Prosecutor Fatou Bensouda
- UN Special Rapporteur on Torture Juan E. Méndez
- Dutch minister and Former UN Special Representative to Sudan Jan Pronk
- Corps Commander, German/Dutch Corps; Former Commander, International Security Assistance Force ISAF, Regional Command South Lieutenant General Ton van Loon
- Prosecutor of the Special Court for Sierra Leone Brenda Hollis

=== Peace and Security Report ===
The Peace and Security Report or (PSR) is free a weekly electronic publication researched and distributed by IPSI. The report reaches about 40 thousand readers per week in most countries around the world.

=== Thought Leadership ===
IPSI coordinates regular meetings of influential personalities and panels on relevant contemporary events.

== Board of directors ==
- Pamela Aall: Former Vice President, Domestic Programs, Education and Training Center, United States Institute of Peace
- Cameron M. Chisholm: Executive Director, International Peace & Security Institute
- Chester Crocker: Former U.S. Assistant Secretary of State
- David Crane: Former Prosecutor, Special Court for Sierra Leone
- Chic Dambach: Former President & CEO, Alliance for Peacebuilding
- George Foote: Partner, Dorsey & Whitney LLP; General Counsel, United States Institute of Peace
- Melanie Greenberg: President & CEO, Alliance for Peacebuilding
- Dr. Philip Terrence Hopmann: Director, Conflict Management Department, Johns Hopkins School of Advanced International Studies (SAIS)
- J. Alexander Little: Assistant U.S. Attorney, Nashville, TN
- Kevin Melton: Senior Engagement Manager, AECOM
- William Stuebner: Former Special Adviser to the Prosecutor of the International Criminal Tribunal for the Former Yugoslavia (ICTY); Former Chief of Staff and Senior Deputy for Human Rights of the OSCE Mission to Bosnia and Herzegovina
- Dr. I. William Zartman (Chairman): Professor Emeritus, Johns Hopkins School of Advanced International Studies (SAIS)

== Board of Advisors ==
The International Peace and Security Institute was founded by some of the world's foremost leaders in the fields of conflict resolution and security to address critical unfulfilled educational priorities.

- Ahmedou Ould-Abdallah: Special Representative for the UN Secretary-General
- Betty Bigombe: State Minister for Water Resources in the Cabinet of Uganda, Member of Parliament, Chief Mediator between the Uganda Government and the LRA
- Dr. Francis Deng: Under-Secretary-General of the United Nations; UN Special Adviser for the Prevention of Genocide
- Jan Eliasson: UN Deputy Secretary General; Former President of the sixtieth session of the United Nations General Assembly
- The Hon. Gareth Evans: Former Foreign Minister, Australia; President Emeritus, International Crisis Group
- Dr. Ted Robert Gurr Distinguished University Professor Emeritus, University of Maryland
- Amb. Jacques Paul Klein Special Representative of the Secretary-General and Coordinator of United Nations Mission in Liberia; Special Representative of the Secretary-General to Bosnia and Herzegovina
- Peter Kyle: Lead Counsel, The World Bank
- Dr. John Paul Lederach Professor of International Peacebuilding, University of Notre Dame
- Jeffrey Mapendere: Executive Director, CIIAN; Sudan Country Director, The Carter Center International Observation Program
- John Marks: President, Search for Common Ground
- Susan Collin Marks: Senior Vice President, Search for Common Ground
- Dr. Joyce Neu: Founder and Senior Associate, Facilitating Peace; Former Team Leader, UN Standby Team of Mediation Experts
- John Prendergast: Founder, The Enough Project
- Dr. Valerie Rosoux: Research Fellow, Belgian National Fund for Scientific Research
- Dr. Ruth Wedgwood: Director, International Law and Organizations Program, Paul H. Nitze School of Advanced International Studies
- Dr. Craig Zelizer: Associate Director, Conflict Resolution Program, Georgetown University
