= Bonnah Kaluwa =

Tanzanian politician

Bonnah Kamoli Kaluwa (born 29 December 1978) has been a representative of the Segerea constituency in the Parliament of Tanzania since 2015. Prior to winning the general election, Bonnah was a ward councillor of Kipawa where she lived for five years from 2010.

== Early life and education ==
Bonnah was born on 29 December 1978 in the Geita Region to Moses Moses Kaluwa. She attended Kalangalala Primary School from 1985 to 1991 and Mwenge Secondary School from 1992 to 1996. She joined the University of Dar es Salaam Computing Centre in 2007 and obtained a certificate in Business Information and Technology. In 2012, she graduated with a Bachelor of Science in IT and Business Management. She then joined the Centre for Foreign Relations where she was awarded a Post Graduate Diploma in Management and Foreign Relations; her research involved the impact of illegal immigration on human security.

== Individual activities ==
Bonnah is the CEO and Administration Manager of “For You Classic Boutique”, a chain of boutiques that sells designer handbags and shoes. She is also the Director of S & B Marketing Consultants.

== Entry in politics ==
From an early age. Bonnah was a regular member of the Chama Cha Mapinduzi. In 2010 she decided to officially enter into competitive politics and ran for the thirteen wards council of the Kipawa ward and emerged victorious.

== Development projects for the Kipawa ward ==
Wamama Na Maendeleo

As the councilor, Bonnah initiated Wamama Na Maendeleo (WaNaMa) which helped at least 500 women of the Kiapawa ward get small loans to do business through unit groups.

Mazingira Bora Kwa Elimu Bora

Through this project 7 schools were built within the ward; extra classrooms were added to schools; desks were provided to nursery schools, 2 high schools, and 5 primary schools. Water wells were also drilled at 2 secondary schools and 3 primary schools.

Maji Safi Na Salama Campaign

Each household in Kipawa constituency received water service through the boreholes constructed.

Construction of Dispensaries

Dispensaries were built in Kipawa ward for the first time since independence.

Bonnah Education Trust Fund

This special fund was established in 2012 with the aim of educating children with special needs, orphans, and those from unjustified families. Since its inception, they have been able to educate at least 100 children every year.
