= Ahmedou Ould-Abdallah =

Mauritanian diplomat

Ahmedou Ould-Abdallah أحمدو ولد عبد الله
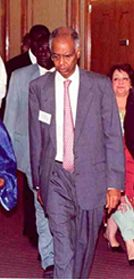
- Ahmedou Ould-Abdallah at a conference in Dakar in 2003.

United Nations Special Envoy for Somalia
- In office 12 September 2007 – 9 June 2010
- Appointed by: Ban Ki-moon
- Succeeded by: Augustine Mahiga

Special Representative of the Secretary-General for West Africa
- In office 2003–2007
- Succeeded by: Lamine Cissé

Personal details
- Born: 21 November 1940 (age 85)
- Education: University of Grenoble; University of Paris

Ahmedou Ould-Abdallah (Arabic: أحمدو ولد عبد الله) (born November 21, 1940) is a Mauritanian diplomat who was a senior United Nations official.

== Background ==
Ould-Abdallah was born on November 21, 1940, in Mauritania. He graduated from a secondary school in Dakar, Senegal. He studied economics at the University of Grenoble and the University of Paris and political science at the Sorbonne.

== Career ==
=== Ambassador for Mauritania ===
From 1968 to 1985 he held several cabinet-level posts in the Mauritanian government, serving as Minister for Foreign Affairs and Cooperation and as Minister of Trade and Transportation. He also served as Mauritania's Ambassador to Belgium, Luxembourg, the Netherlands, the European Union and the United States. Moreover, he was Chief Executive Officer at the Société Nationale Industrielle et Minière de Mauritanie, the largest mining company and cooperation in Mauritania.

=== UN Special Representative ===
Between 1985 and 1993, Ould-Abdallah worked as adviser on energy, including renewable energies and African issues, to the United Nations Secretary-General. From 1993 to 1995, he was Secretary General Boutros Boutros-Ghali's Special Representative in Burundi, during the first part of the Burundi Civil War. Between 1996 and 2002, he served as the Executive Secretary of the Global Coalition for Africa, a Washington D.C.–based intergovernmental forum dedicated to African issues. In 2002, Secretary General Kofi Annan appointed him Special Representative for West Africa at the head of the United Nations Office for West Africa.

From 2003 to 2007, Ould-Abdallah was jointly Special Representative of the Secretary-General for West Africa and Chairman of the Cameroon-Nigeria Mixed Commission. He was successful in supporting the peaceful settlement of the land and maritime border dispute between the two countries.

In 2006, the United Nations Secretary-General Kofi Annan sent him on a short-term mission as Special Envoy to Sudan to clarify the agreement with the Sudanese Government on the proposed UN-AU joint peacekeeping force.

Ould-Abdallah has also been active in the work of non-governmental organizations, including the Global Coalition for Africa and the World Future Council, the International Centre for Ethics, Justice and Public Life of Brandeis University, ICRC, and Search for Common Ground. He is a co-founder and a member of the Advisory Board of Transparency International. He is member of the International Advisory Board of the African Press Organization (APO), as well as serving on the Board of Advisors of the International Peace and Security Institute (IPSI). He served on the Board of Directors of Search for Common Ground from 1997 to 2004, is a current member since 2011.

==== Somalia ====
From September 2007 until July 2010, Ould-Abdallah served as Special Representative for the UN Secretary-General for Somalia. In this position he mediated peace talks between the Transitional Federal Government of Somalia and the Union of Islamic Courts (UIC) and the Alliance for the Reliberation of Somalia (ARS) based in Asmara, Eritrea.

He successfully negotiated the agreement between the two parties. This agreement is known as the Djibouti Agreement It was the first agreement of this kind not sponsored by a specific country, but signed under the auspices of the United Nations. African Union, the Arab league, the Organisation of Islamic Cooperation, the United States, the European Union, the United Kingdom and France were co-signatures to the agreement. Mr. Ould-Abdallah established the well acclaimed steering committee on Somalia, composed of the United Nations, African Union and Intergovernmental Authority on Development.

In July 2010, after the longest term in Somalia of any United Nations Special Representative, Ould-Abdallah announced his retirement from the United Nations in a farewell letter to the Somali diaspora. He also thanked the leadership of Somalia's Transitional Federal Government (TFG) with whom he had worked closely. Ould-Abdallah returned to United Nations Headquarters in New York City as the Mediator-in-Residence to the Department of Political Affairs of the United Nations Secretariat in November 2010 for his de-briefing.

Ouid-Abdallah is on the Board of Advisors for the International Peace and Security Institute.

== Books ==
- Ould-Abdallah, Ahmedou, Burundi on the Brink, 1993-95: A UN Special Envoy Reflects on Preventive Diplomacy, Washington: United States Institute of Peace Press, 2000. ISBN 1-929223-00-5
- Ould-Abdallah, Ahmedou, La Diplomatie Pyromane : Burundi, Rwanda, Somalie, Bosnie… : Entretiens avec Stephen Smith, Paris : Calmann-Levy, 1997. ISBN 978-2-7021-2672-1

== Awards ==
Officier de l’Ordre National du Mérite, Mauritanie.

Commandeur de la Légion d’Honneur, France.

Officier de l’Ordre du Lion, Sénégal.

Officier de l’Ordre Léopold II, Belgium.

Knight Golden Lion Order of the House of Nassau, Luxemburg.
