= Augustine Mahiga =

Tanzanian diplomat (1945–2020)

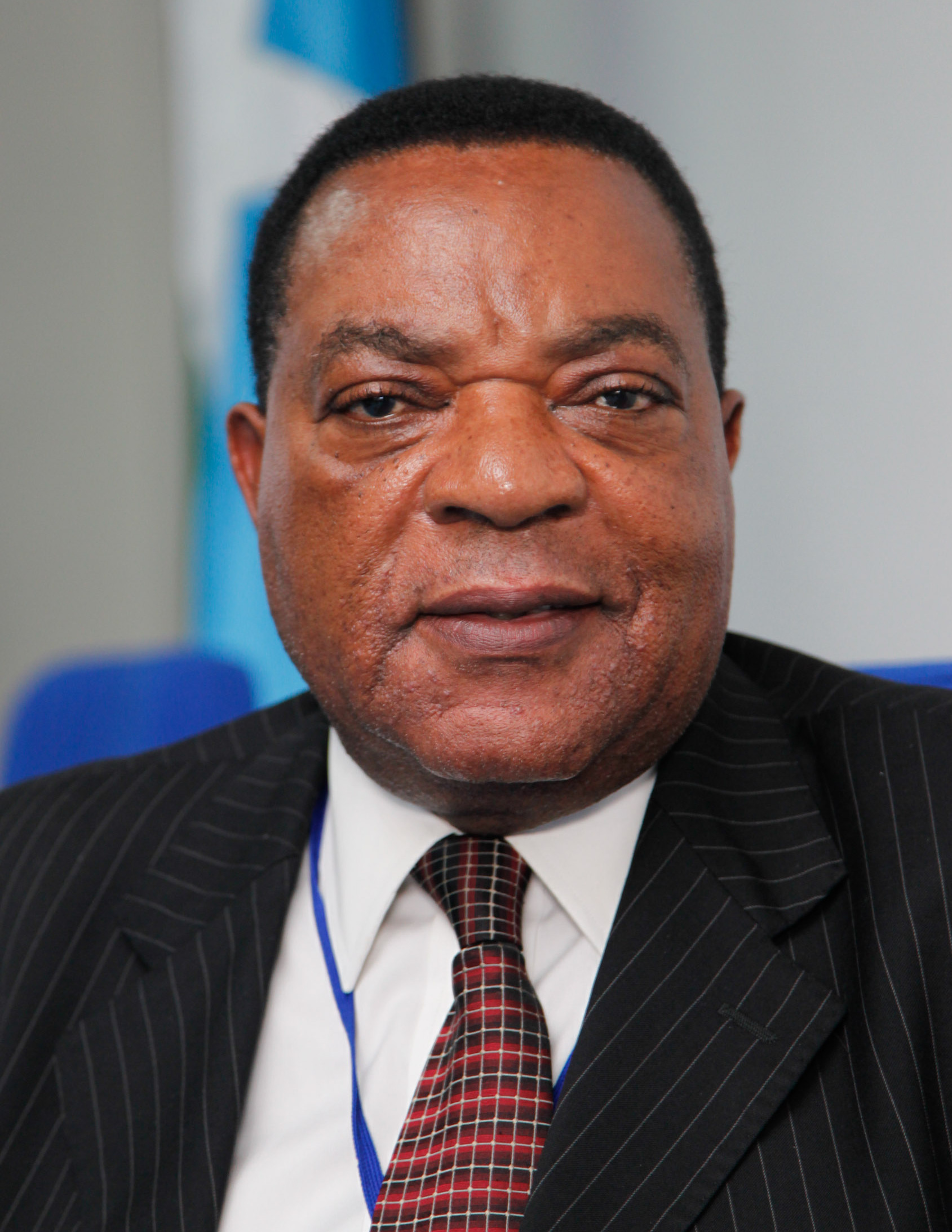

5th Minister of Justice and Constitutional Affairs
- In office 3 March 2019 – 1 May 2020
- President: John Magufuli
- Preceded by: Palamagamba Kabudi
- Succeeded by: Mwigulu Nchemba

14th Minister of Foreign Affairs
- In office 12 December 2015 – 3 March 2019
- Preceded by: Bernard Membe
- Succeeded by: Palamagamba John Aidan Mwaluko Kabudi

United Nations Special Envoy for Somalia
- In office 9 June 2010 – 3 June 2013
- Appointed by: Ban Ki-moon
- Preceded by: Ahmedou Ould-Abdallah
- Succeeded by: Nicholas Kay

Permanent Representative of Tanzania to the United Nations
- In office 2003–2010
- Preceded by: Daudi Mwakawago
- Succeeded by: Ombeni Sefue

Personal details
- Born: 28 August 1945 Tosamaganga, Iringa, Tanganyika
- Died: 1 May 2020 (aged 74) Dodoma, Tanzania
- Party: CCM
- Education: UDSM (BA); UToronto (MA), (PhD)

Augustine Philip Mahiga (28 August 1945 – 1 May 2020) was a Tanzanian diplomat and Minister of Justice and Constitutional Affairs in 2019 and 2020. He served as Minister of Foreign Affairs from 2015 to 2019. He previously served as the Permanent Representative of Tanzania to the United Nations from 2003 to 2010 and as the UN Special Representative and Head of the United Nations Political Office for Somalia from 2010 to 2013.

In December 2015, he was nominated as a Member of Parliament by President John Magufuli and thereafter appointed to the Cabinet as Minister of Foreign Affairs.

== Early life and education ==
Mahiga was born in Tosamaganga, Iringa on August 28, 1945. He had his primary education between 1952 and 1955 at Tosamaganga primary school, between 1956 and 1959 at Tosamaganga middle school, between 1960 and 1963 at Tosamaganga secondary school and between 1964 and 1965 at Tosamaganga High School. In 1971, he earned a Bachelor of Arts (Education) at the University of East Africa in Dar es Salaam, Tanzania. That same year, Mahiga completed a Masters of Arts at the University of Toronto (U of T). He also received a PhD in International Relations in 1975 from the same institution.

== Personal life ==
Mahiga was married and had three children.

== Career ==
=== Permanent Representative to the United Nations ===
Mahiga served as Permanent Representative of Tanzania to the United Nations from 2003 to 2010.

=== UN Special Representative ===
Between 2010 and 2013, he also served as the United Nations Special Representative and Head of the United Nations Political Office for Somalia. He was appointed to the positions by UN Secretary General Ban Ki-moon on 9 June 2010, replacing Ahmedou Ould-Abdallah.

==== Kampala Accord ====
On 9 June 2011, Mahiga, along with the Ugandan President Yoweri Museveni, oversaw a signed agreement in Kampala between Somalia's incumbent President Sharif Sheikh Ahmed and the Speaker of Parliament Sharif Hassan Sheikh Aden. After months of political infighting over whether to hold presidential elections in August 2011, the two politicians agreed to postpone the vote for a new president and parliamentary Speaker for one year in exchange for the resignation of the Premier within a period of thirty days. The signed Kampala Accord would also see the well-regarded technocratic Cabinet that Prime Minister of Somalia Mohamed Abdullahi Mohamed had assembled in November 2010 re-composed to make way for a new government. Political analysts suggested that the agreement may have been a bid on President Sharif Ahmed's part to fend off attempts by the Speaker of Parliament Sharif Hassan to force him from power by pre-emptively "sacrificing" the Premier. Hassan was reported to harbour presidential ambitions of his own.

The announcement of Prime Minister Mohamed's proposed resignation was immediately met with protests in various cities. Thousands of civilians, many government soldiers, and some legislators marched through the streets of Mogadishu, calling for the dismissal of the President, the Parliament Speaker and the Parliament. The crowd also demanded that the Premier be reinstated and described Mohamed as the "only honest leader in recent years". Posters of the UN Special Envoy were symbolically burned, with protestors appealing to the UN Secretary General to dismiss Mahiga due to what many felt was the latter's infringement on Somalia's sovereignty through his signing of the Kampala agreement. Attacks on hotels in which members of parliament were staying and at least five deaths were also reported. Additional demonstrations against the Premier's resignation were held in Galkacyo, a key trading city in the north-central Mudug region, as well as in Belet Hawo in the far south. Internationally, protests also reportedly took place in Cairo, Nairobi, Johannesburg, Sydney, London, Rome, Stockholm, Minneapolis and Toronto.

In response, Prime Minister Mohamed released a statement through the state-run Radio Mogadishu commending the military for its rapid response and urging its troops to exercise restraint. He also appealed to the public to calm down, and indicated that "I have seen your expressions and heard your calls[...] You are part of the decision making – what you want must be heard." Additionally, in a press conference, the Premier called for the immediate release of all protestors who had been detained, and stated that his administration would launch an independent investigation into their arrest. Weighing in on the demonstrations, Mogadishu's Mayor Mohamed Nur suggested that "what [the demonstrators] have a problem with is that two people go and decide the fate of this government without considering the feelings of this population", and that putting the issue before Parliament for approval is a more democratic course of action.

On 11 June 2011, Prime Minister Mohamed released a statement indicating that the Kampala decision ought to be presented in Parliament for debate and appraised according to the laws stipulated in the national constitution. The Premier also stated that he would only step down if lawmakers voted to uphold the accord. This was echoed by the Cabinet, which indicated in a press release that, after having convened to discuss the Kampala decision, the Ministers agreed that the accord must be put before Parliament for evaluation. In addition, over 200 parliamentarians reportedly sought to urge the Prime Minister to reconvene Parliament so as to deliberate the decision, indicating in a separate statement that the accord deprived MPs of their legislative role vis-a-vis the government.

On 12 June 2011, President Sharif Ahmed released a statement wherein he condemned the protests, describing them as "illegal". He also suggested that some government officials were financing the rallies in Mogadishu, and warned that the Al-Shabaab group of Islamists that is waging war against the federal government could try to exploit the gatherings to launch terrorist attacks.

The same day, news reports surfaced indicating that UN Secretary General Ban Ki-Moon would sack Special Envoy Augustine Mahiga on account of a lack of tangible progress made and public confidence in Mahiga's work in Somalia. UN sources also stated that, due to prevalent allegations of graft, the Secretary General would fire half of the senior staff in various UN bureaus, including the UNPOS, UNDP, UNICEF, WHO and OCHA.

In an interview on 16 June 2011, Undersecretary for Foreign Affairs of Italy, Alfredo Mantica, expressed support for Prime Minister Mohamed's position with regard to the Kampala agreement. Mantica stated that the Italian government believed that the accord ought to be reviewed in Parliament. He also indicated that "the prime minister has been in office five months. And [it is too] early to judge his work. But what he has done so far has been very positive. It has achieved important results. The government already seemed a miracle[...] The strength of the instability in Somalia is a constant. And the prime minister represents stability."

On 19 June 2011, Mohamed Abdullahi Mohamed resigned from his position as Prime Minister of Somalia. Part of the controversial Kampala Accord's conditions, the agreement would also see the mandates of the President, the Parliament Speaker and Deputies extended until August 2012, after which point new elections are to be organised. In his farewell speech, Prime Minister Mohamed indicated that he was stepping down in "the interest of the Somali people and the current situation in Somalia". He also thanked his Cabinet for its efforts in improving the security situation and the standards of governance in the country.

Abdiweli Mohamed Ali, Mohamed's former Minister of Planning and International Cooperation, was appointed as Acting Premier later the same day. A few days later, on 23 June 2011, Ali was named permanent Prime Minister.

Prime Minister Mohamed's resignation was immediately met with anger by the general public and many lawmakers. Apprehension regarding a possible resurgence of governmental corruption and lassitude, long-standing problems which Mohamed's administration had made significant strides toward eradicating, were cited as primary reasons for the consternation. According to one legislator, many policy-makers are trying to repeal the Kampala decision, as it also "subject[s] the country to trusteeship." Another MP indicated that "lawmakers are united in their opposition to the deal" and "will object [to] it until we throw it away".

Observers have suggested that Mohamed's resignation could offer militants an opportunity to capitalise on the situation and set back the territorial gains made by his administration in the ongoing insurgency in southern Somalia. They have also opined that firing the Premier would not resolve the long-standing power struggle between President Sharif Ahmed and Parliament Speaker Sharif Hassan, but may inadvertently exacerbate and prolong it. Additionally, political analysts have suggested that the Kampala agreement presents other potential long-term issues, such as facilitating intervention and meddling by neighbouring countries, with the Ugandan government's role as the final arbiter, in particular, cited as problematic.

Responding to the Kampala decision, the Al-Shabaab insurgent group's head of policy and regions, Sheikh Hussein Ali Fidow, told reporters on 22 June 2011 that the accord ended in failure since it was "an example [of how] the country is managed by Uganda" and that "it is clear for the Somali people and the international community that [the] Kampala meeting [on] Somalia was aimed to coerce the Prime Minister Mohamed Abdullahi Mohamed to step down". In addition, the spokesman suggested that Somalia's citizenry was aware of what was going on and that it did not recognise President Sharif Ahmed and the Parliament Speaker Sharif Hassan as legitimate governmental authorities. He also reiterated his group's call for Ugandan troops to withdraw from the country.

On 24 June 2011, lawmakers reaffirmed their opposition to and intention of repealing the Kampala decision. The chairman of the federal Information, Public Awareness, Culture and Heritage Committee, Awad Ahmed Ashareh, indicated that 165 legislators had tendered a motion in Parliament opposing the agreement, but the Speaker rebuffed it. Ashareh also stated that MPs would issue a vote of no confidence vis-a-vis the Speaker Hassan if he continued to refuse to permit debate to take place, suggesting that Hassan's refusal "contravenes the Charter and rules of procedure."

Following talks with parliamentarians, President Sharif Ahmed asserted on 28 June 2011 that, on account of opposition amongst legislators to the Kampala decision, the accord would be brought before Parliament for deliberation. He also indicated that the agreement would not be implemented unless approved by lawmakers.

==== End of term and extended career ====
Mahiga's term as the UN Special Representative for Somalia ended on 3 June 2013. Secretary General Ban Ki-Moon commended him on his close work with the Somali authorities, which saw the end of the transitional period and the establishment of a permanent Federal Government of Somalia. UK diplomat Nicholas Kay was concurrently appointed as Mahiga's replacement.

After his retirement, he joined the Chama Cha Mapinduzi presidential nomination ticket in 2015, but lost to current President John Magufuli.

As Minister of Foreign Affairs, he addressed climate change as "an existential challenge to the planet", saying that it was "disheartening" to see melting ice from the Kilimanjaro. In the same address, he acknowledged the threat of terrorism in Africa, noting the killing of a Tanzanian soldier in the Democratic Republic of the Congo by the Allied Democratic Forces insurgents and said that while his country was receiving refugees from that country, they would implement the peace agreement with the promise of timely elections in that country. As Foreign Minister, he also expressed the position of Tanzania on nuclear weapons, commending the Comprehensive Nuclear-Test-Ban Treaty and condemning North Korea for its tests.

In 2019, after a cabinet reshuffle, he was appointed to the Ministry of Justice and Constitutional Affairs. As Minister of Justice and Constitutional Affairs, he blocked the right of individuals and NGOs to directly file cases against the country at the African Court on Human and People's Rights (AfCHPR). Amnesty International condemned the move by saying that "the withdrawal of rights will rob people and organizations in Tanzania a vital avenue to justice". In that decision, Tanzania became the second country after Rwanda to withdraw the right of individuals and NGOs to directly access the African Court.

== Death ==
Mahiga died, after a short illness, believed to be COVID-19, while being taken to medical facilities from his Dodoma home on 1 May 2020.

== See also ==
- List of foreign ministers in 2017
