= I. William Zartman =

American academic (1932–2025)

Ira William Zartman (January 9, 1932 – July 28, 2025) was an American academic who was a professor at the Paul H. Nitze School of Advanced International Studies (SAIS) of Johns Hopkins University. He earlier directed the school's Conflict Management and African Studies programs. He held the Jacob Blaustein Chair in International Organizations and Conflict Resolution. He was a founder and board chairman of the International Peace and Security Institute (IPSI). Zartman died in Silver Spring, Maryland, on July 28, 2025, at the age of 93.

== Bibliography ==
=== Books ===
- Destiny of a Dynasty: The Search for Institutions in Morocco's Developing Society (1964)
- Collapsed States: The Disintegration and Restoration of Legitimate Authority (1995)
- Peacemaking in International Conflict (1997) Ed. United States Institute of Peace
- International Negotiation: Actors, Structure/Process, Values (1999)
- International Multilateral Negotiations; Approaches to the Management of Complexity (1999)
- Power and Negotiation (2000)
- Preventive Negotiation: Avoiding Conflict Escalation (2001)
- A Strategic Vision for Africa: The Kampala Movement (2002)
- Getting It Done: Post-Agreement Negotiation and International Regimes (2003)
- Rethinking the Economics of War: The Intersection of Need, Creed, and Greed (2005)
- Zartman, I. William, ed. (2015). Arab Spring : negotiating in the shadow of the intifadat. Athens, Ga.: University of Georgia Press.
- Rethinking Conflict Management and Resolution with Siniša Vuković (2023)

=== Critical studies and reviews of Zartman's work ===
Arab Spring

- Hodge, Timothy (Spring–Summer 2016). "Negotiating transition". Book Reviews. Journal of International Affairs. 69 (2): 215–216. Archived from the original on 2022-05-01.
