= Permanent Representative of Tanzania to the United Nations =

"representative of Tanzania to the UN"

Permanent Representative of the United Republic of Tanzania
- Flag of the United Nations
- Inaugural holder: Vedast Kyaruzi
- Formation: 1962
- Website: Permanent Mission website]

This is a list of the Permanent Representatives of the United Republic of Tanzania to the United Nations. The current office holder is Modest Jonathan Mero.

== List ==
№	Permanent Representative	Years served	United Nations Secretary-General
1	Vedast Kyaruzi(1921-2012)	1962 January–July	U Thant
2	A. Z. Nsilo Swai (1925-1994)	1962 July–December	U Thant
3	Erasto A. M. Mang'enya (1915-1986)	1963-1964	U Thant
4	John Malecela (1934- )	1964-1968	U Thant
5	Akili B.C. Daniel(1934-1969)	1968-1969	U Thant
6	Salim Ahmed Salim	1970-1972	U Thant
6	Salim Ahmed Salim	1972-1980	Kurt Waldheim
7	Paul Milyango Rupia	1981-1982	Kurt Waldheim
7	Paul Milyango Rupia	1982-1984	Javier Pérez de Cuéllar
8	Muhammed Ali Foum	1984-1986	Javier Pérez de Cuéllar
9	Wilbert Kumalija Chagula	1986-1989	Javier Pérez de Cuéllar
10	Anthony B. Nyakyi	1989-1992	Javier Pérez de Cuéllar
10	Anthony B. Nyakyi	1992-1994	Boutros Boutros-Ghali
11	Daudi N. Mwakawago	1994-1997	Boutros Boutros-Ghali
11	Daudi N. Mwakawago	1997-2003	Kofi Annan
12	Augustine Mahiga	2003-2007	Kofi Annan
12	Augustine Mahiga	2007-2010	Ban Ki-moon
13	Ombeni Sefue	2010-2012	Ban Ki-moon
14	Tuvako Manongi	2012-2017	Ban Ki-moon
15	Modest Jonathan Mero	2017 -2021	António Guterres
16	Prof. Keneddy G. Gastorn 2020 - 2023 17   Hussein A. Katanga 2023-2025  1		António Guterres

== See also ==
- Foreign relations of Tanzania
