= Mange Kimambi =

Tanzanian activist and social media influencer (born 1980)

- Born: 1980 (age 45–46), potentially Dar Es Salaam
- Other name: Dada wa Taifa (en: Sister of the Nation)
- Education: University of Dar Es Salaam
- Occupations: Social media influencer, activist

Mange Kimambi (born 1980) is a Tanzanian activist and social media influencer. She first became known for her social media content and for creating the Mange Kimambi App, the first successful pay-to-read gossip and news app in Tanzania. She began as a strong supporter of the government of Tanzania, but has since become a prominent opposition activist against the government. She is known as Dada wa Taifa, or Sister of the Nation.

== Early life ==
Kimambi was born in Dar es Salaam, Tanzania. According to her passport, she was born in 1980, but her birth certificate disagrees by four years. She was raised in Dar Es Salaam by her father and stepmother: her family had disputes over custody of her when she was young. She studied at Arusha Secondary School and also was educated in Zimbabwe. She first sought to attend college in the United States, but left due to the birth of her first child, and ultimately earned her Bachelor of Business Administration from University of Dar es Salaam through an online program. She also earned a MBA from a school in Dubai.

== Mange Kimambi App ==
In 2009, she became a blogger focused on lifestyle and gossip content, and the same year launched news and gossip platform U-Turn, which requires a paid subscription to access. The platform became better known as the Mange Kimambi App. It has been one of the most highly-viewed apps in Tanzania, despite its paid status, receiving between 5,000 and 8,000 views per day on weekdays, and was the first successful paid gossip and news app in Tanzania. Her work during this period has been compared to Perez Hilton by fellow Tanzanian opposition activist Maria Sarungi Tsehai.

The Mange Kimambi App has been criticized for the information it presents, including outing LGBTQI+ Tanzanians. In one incident, the app distributed a video of a gay Tanzanian engaged in sexual relations without his consent, identifying him by name. In 2022, the app's then-director and other employees were arraigned for a video of Joseph Haule taken without his permission while he was entering the hospital. In 2023, the app was banned by the Tanzanian government, and it became only accessible by virtual private networks. However, it continued to be used.

== Political activism ==
Her first entry into political debate was in 2011, when she was in support of the government. In 2015, she became a vocal supporter of ruling-party candidate John Magufuli. She actively campaigned for him after being recruited by the ruling party, utilizing social media posts ridiculing his opponent and praising him and creating a social media "push-up trend" to support him.

However, due to actions of his such as banning opposition party political activities and removing the live broadcast of parliamentary activities, by 2016 she was a vocal leader of the opposition, and organized rallies against the government in 2018 over Telegram. The government declared this to be treason, and mobilized riot police. According to Reuters, however, very few people attended. During this period, she stated she would never return to Tanzania unless as a corpse. She was the main mobilizer of major rallies in 2021.

Later in 2021, though, after the ascension of Samia Suluhu Hassan, relations were seen as thawing. She met Hassan in person in the United States in September 2021, where she was greeted with Hassan saying "nimefurahi kukuona", or "I'm glad to see you". The two were photographed together. Relations later deteriorated, and she returned to activism in opposition of the government. She urged protests instead of voting in 2025. In the same year, she was charged with money laundering through her Mange Kimambi app by the government of Tanzania: they asserted that she posed as a journalist without accreditation and pushed subjects to pay. Tanzanian Attorney General Hamza Johari announced he would be seeking to extradite her from the United States. In response, she asserted that "The US government will laugh at you like the fools you are." As of December 2025, the case had been adjourned until late January 2026.

In 2025, her accounts on Instagram were blocked, which she alleged was due to Meta being pressured by the Tanzanian government. Meta has disputed this, as has the government. At the time of her being blocked, she had nearly 3,000,000 followers. Subsequently, many of her followers wrote to Meta and CEO Mark Zuckerberg demanding the restoration of her account. In August 2026, she sued Meta for her accounts being blocked, under these same allegations. She is popularly known as Dada wa Taifa, or Sister of the Nation.

== Personal life ==
Outside of her political activism, she has been described as the nemesis of Zari Hassan. She has still continued her gossip blogging. In 2026, she removed her breast implants, and announced that for a week after the surgery she would be inactive on social media: she stated she had to announce this "so no one worries". She has resided in Los Angeles since 2012.
