= John William Kijazi =

Tanzanian diplomat and university chancellor (1956–2021)

John Kijazi

Chief Secretary to the President
- In office 9 March 2016 – 17 February 2021
- President: John Magufuli
- Preceded by: Ombeni Sefue
- Succeeded by: Bashiru Ally

Chancellor to the UDOM
- In office 12 August 2020 – 17 February 2021
- President: John Magufuli
- Preceded by: Benjamin Mkapa

Personal details
- Born: 18 November 1956 Tanga District, Tanganyika
- Died: 17 February 2021 (aged 64) Dodoma, Tanzania
- Spouse: Francisca Kijazi
- Children: David Kijazi, Emmanuel Kijazi and Richard Kijazi
- Relatives: William Kijazi( grandson), Mikaela Kijazi(granddaughter), John-William Kijazi (grandson), Anna Kijazi(granddaughter)
- Education: University of Dar es Salaam, University of Birmingham
- Profession: Engineer, Diplomat, Civil servant

John William Kijazi (18 November 1956 – 17 February 2021) was a Tanzanian diplomat and Chancellor of the University of Dodoma. He was appointed the Chief Secretary to the President of Tanzania on 9 March 2016 by the President John Magufuli.
