= Angola–Cuba relations =

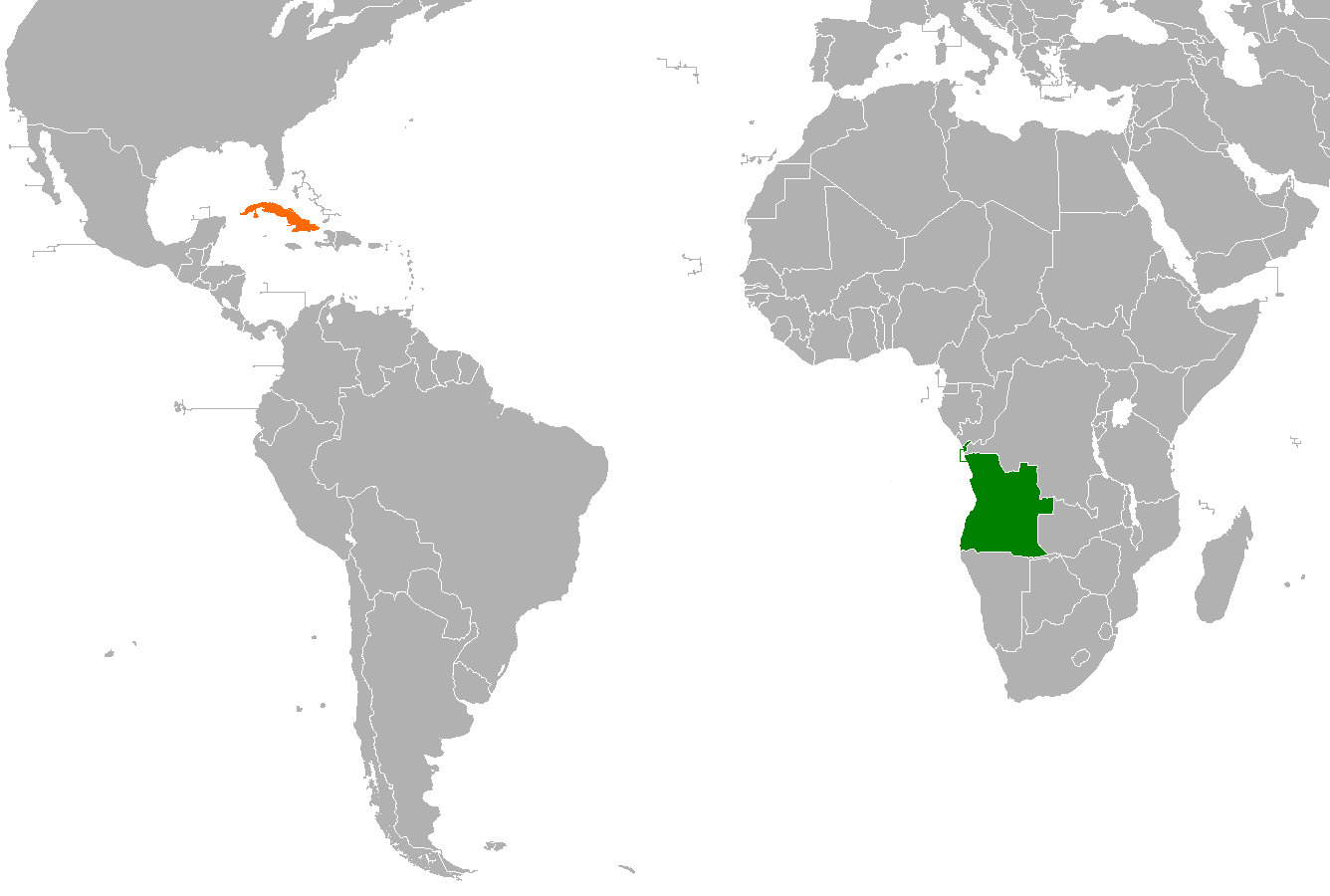

- Angola: Cuba

The deep roots of Angola-Cuba relations stretch back to the 15th century, during the dawn of European maritime expansion. Following the arrival of Christopher Columbus in Cuba by October 1492 and the arrival of Portuguese explorer Diogo Cão at the mouth of the Congo River in Angola in 1482, both territories were rapidly absorbed into rival Iberian empires. As the Spanish Empire developed Cuba into a central hub for sugar and tobacco production, it faced a severe labor shortage due to the decimation of the indigenous Taíno population, while Portugal utilized its stronghold in Angola, designated as Portuguese West Africa, as a primary source for human captivity. Between the 15th and 19th centuries, hundreds of thousands of Angolan captives were forcibly marched to the coast, loaded onto slave ships, and transported across the Atlantic into the Spanish colony of Cuba. A vast number of these individuals were brought to the port of Havana. The Treaty of Tordesillas of 1494 drew an imaginary line down the centre of the Atlantic Ocean, with the Spanish claimed the Americas to the west, while the Portuguese secured Africa and the Indian Ocean to the east. This forced migration deeply infused Cuban culture, religion, and demographics with Angolan roots—particularly through the preservation of Bantu traditions, language remnants, and religious practices. During the Angolan Civil War, Cuban forces fought alongside the Marxist–Leninist People's Movement for the Liberation of Angola (MPLA) government; against the Western-backed National Union for the Total Independence of Angola (UNITA) and National Liberation Front of Angola (FNLA) guerrillas who were aided by the South-African army. The present day outcome of the war resulted in the MPLA changing from a Marxist–Leninist party to a multi-party democratic system based on neoliberal principles (the MPLA also dropped the "Labour Party" extension to its name as a clear sign of dropping their communist aspirations). From an economic standpoint, Cuba has lost its preferred status among Angolans and South Africa has become the biggest single investor and trading partner with Angola (outside oil sales).

Pedro Rosso Leal is the current ambassador of Cuba to Angola.

== History ==
=== 1482–19th century ===
The arrival of Diogo Cão at the Congo River in 1482 and Christopher Columbus landing in Cuba in 1492 set off centuries of transatlantic trade that deeply fused both African and Caribbean histories, because Portugal was the dominant maritime power in Central Africa and Spain held massive Caribbean territories. The connection between Portuguese Angola and Spanish Cuba fundamentally reshaped the culture, demographics, and identity of the Caribbean. The early arrivals in Havana during the late 1500s and early 1600s were frequently classified by Spanish authorities as the Congos, at this time, Havana served primarily as a strategic military naval base and a transit point for the Spanish treasure fleets. By the 19th century, Cuba had become the world’s leading sugar producer, and Havana was a bustling, cosmopolitan metropolis. The abolition of slavery in 1886 shattered the old social order of the Spanish Caribbean. It created a massive population of free Afro-Cubans who, despite their legal freedom, faced systemic racism, economic disenfranchisement, and political exclusion. This collective frustration fueled the final Cuban War of Independence in 1895, led by figures like José Martí and the Afro-Cuban general Antonio Maceo. The year 1898 was a watershed moment for Cuba. As Spain was being ejected from the Americas, Portugal was cementing its "Effective Occupation" of Angola, driven by the pressures of the Berlin Conference (1884–1885). With Spain’s American empire dead, the global spotlight shifted toward Portuguese Africa, of what investigators found was a system that directly echoed the deceptive transitions to freedom seen in Cuba’s patronato. In Angola, the Portuguese implemented the "Regulamentações Sobre o Trabalho de Africanos Nativos" (Regulations on Labor of Native Africans). This framework legally mandated that all "natives" who could not prove they were gainfully employed in European eyes were classified as "vagrants" and forced into labor contracts. Enslaved people were renamed serviçais (contract laborers).

=== 1960s ===
Cuba's relationship with Angola started in the 1960s as part of the "Second Revolution" movement announced by Fidel Castro. The movement intended to bring Marxism–Leninism to Africa starting primarily in Zaire (today known as the Democratic Republic of the Congo). The failed attempt to make a foothold in the Zaire presented various lessons to Cuba which were used in identifying better candidate nations, leaders and better opportunities for success.

Jonas Savimbi, the future president of UNITA, met with Fidel Castro's ally and revolutionary Che Guevara in 1965. Guevara told his superiors he did not trust Savimbi, and Savimbi possibly presented a danger. This was probably linked to the fact that Savimbi did not have any notable aspirations towards Marxism–Leninism. However, to Cuba's surprise, Agostinho Neto (the then leader of the MPLA) had a very strong Marxist leaning which suited the Cuban agenda. In the 1960s, Cuba mobilized a task force to assist Agostinho Neto to build an army and carry out a campaign against the Portuguese colonial leaders with the intent of gaining independence and installing a Marxist state.

=== 1975 ===
In 1975, in response to the demands of the Carnation Revolution, Portugal decided to pull out of its African colonies. By this time Cuba had already infiltrated and commenced large scale activities in the Portuguese colonies of Guinea-Bissau, Mozambique and Angola. Of these African colonies, Angola has vast amounts of oil and an abundance of other natural resources. Given that the 1970s became the awakening of the oil age and knowing that Angola's large oil reserves would serve well to make it a rich and strong backer of a Marxist expansion, Cuba focused on primarily supporting Angolan Marxist rebel movements over the liberation movements of other Portuguese colonies, thus beginning the special relationship between Cuba and Angola.

Portugal set Angola's independence date for 11 November 1975. Three prominent liberation movements contended for the role of leading the newly formed independent country, namely: UNITA, FNLA and the MPLA. Each of the three movements received foreign assistance, UNITA from Western countries, FNLA from China (and later from the West) and MPLA from the Soviets and Cuba. Although many exhaustive attempts were made (by Portugal) to get the three movements to agree to a peaceful democratic system of power sharing (with multi-party democracy), the specter of being the sole ruler of Angola seemed to undermine any peaceful solution. Cuba added to the failure of the Alvor Accord (to bring the three parties together) by inducing MPLA to believe that with Cuba's backing they could dominate any military confrontation and win Angola's rule.

With the failure of the Alvor Accord, the stage was set for a high-noon shoot-out among the three parties in a win-all competition. The victor would become the leader of Angola. It seemed a foregone conclusion that the party which held control over Luanda (the capital city) on 11 November 1975 would be recognized as the governing party. This put the MPLA (who had a base following in Luanda) at a natural advantage. The other two parties then sought foreign military assistance to take on the Cuban-backed MPLA and make an attempt to gain control of Luanda.

Castro dismissed the chairman of the Joint Chiefs of Staff and the heads of Cuba's Revolutionary Armed Forces (MINFAR) and the Air Force between August 20 and September 5 so they could put all their energy into planning and orchestrating Cuba's invasion of Angola. The Soviets, aware of Castro's plans, opposed Castro's invasion plans (as the Soviets correctly believed the Cubans could set off greater discord in the cold war détente) but stood by him. Castro asked Leonid Brezhnev for staff officers to train People's Armed Forces for the Liberation of Angola (FAPLA) fighters and transportation for Cuban soldiers, requests the USSR ignored. The Soviets did send military advisers to council MPLA leaders in Brazzaville. The Cuban government gave the MPLA 12,000 M-52 rifles from Czechoslovakia, 133 RPGs from Bulgaria, mortars, light artillery, and machine guns.

Cuba's leaders appointed Raúl Diaz Argüelles as commander of the Cuban Military Mission in Angola. Argüelles, subordinate to General Abelardo Colomé Ibarra, the First Deputy Minister of the FAR, traveled with 480 soldiers from Cuba to Lisbon, Portugal and then to Luanda. They escaped detection, arriving on August 21, by posing as tourists. None of them carried weapons. Many carried luggage packed with cash.

The intense effort by the Cubans made the MPLA the leading military power. Seeing the mass of Soviet-made military weapons arriving in Angola (destined for Cuban forces and MPLA cadres), Savimbi made a desperate appeal to the West for assistance. The US Central Intelligence Agency (CIA) had been tracking the communist build-up in Angola and understood the gravity of the situation. Although the CIA wanted to intervene in a large scale, the US laws (Clark Amendment) severely restricted the CIA intervention in undeclared wars. The CIA attempted to circumvent their own legislation and employed a limited number of mercenaries engaged in Angola. The CIA also turned to South Africa (at the time an apartheid state) for assistance in response to the Cuban build-up. South Africa had invested in the Caluque Hydro Scheme in Southern Angola (which fed into Namibia) and had a natural fear of the effects of instability in Angola – thus South Africa initially sent troops to protect the Hydro Scheme (and later intervened in the civil war).

The government of the Soviet Union, well aware of South African activity in southern Angola, flew Cuban soldiers into Luanda one week before November 11, the declared date of independence. While Cuban officers led the mission and provided the bulk of the troop force, 60 Soviet officers in the Congo joined the Cubans on November 12. The Soviet leadership expressly forbade the Cubans from intervening in Angola's civil war, focusing the mission on containing South Africa. Cuba ignored Soviet pleas and undertook a full large-scale invasion with a staggering 35,000 troops landing in Angola at the peak of their invasion.

In 1975 and 1976 most foreign forces, with the exception of Cuba, withdrew. The last elements of the Portuguese military withdrew in 1975. The US found themselves in a political impasse with internal government support and discord over the Angola issue (of which Cuba and the USSR took advantage). Eventually in February 1976 the Tunney Amendment passed forbidding the US from participating in Angola. Without US official support the South African military commenced their withdrawal in February 1976. On the other hand, Cuba's troop force in Angola increased from 5,500 in December 1975 to 11,000 in February 1976. FNLA forces were crushed by Operation Carlota, a joint Cuban–Angolan attack on Huambo on January 30, 1976. By mid-November, the Huambo government had gained control over southern Angola and began pushing north.

=== 1977 ===
Angolan government and Cuban troops had control over all southern cities by 1977. Savimbi expressed his willingness for rapprochement with the MPLA and the formation of a unity, socialist government, but he insisted on Cuban withdrawal first. "The real enemy is Cuban colonialism", Savimbi told reporters, warning, "The Cubans have taken over the country". UNITA accused Cuban troops of using flame throwers, bulldozers, and planes with napalm to destroy villages in a 2.6-kilometre-wide (1.6 mi) area along the Angola-Namibia border. Only women and children passed through this area, the "Castro Corridor", because Cuban troops had shot all males ten years of age or older to prevent them from joining the UNITA. The napalm killed cattle to feed government troops and to retaliate against UNITA sympathizers. Angolans fled from their homeland; 10,000 going south to Namibia and 16,000 east to Zambia, where they lived in refugee camps. Foreign Secretary Lord Carrington of the United Kingdom expressed similar concerns over British involvement in Rhodesia's Bush War during the Lancaster House negotiations in 1980.

=== Shaba invasions ===
Shaba Province, Zaire

1,500 members of the Front for the National Liberation of the Congo (FNLC) invaded Shaba, Zaire, from eastern Angola on March 7, 1977. The FNLC wanted to overthrow Mobutu and the Angolan government, suffering from Mobutu's support for the FNLA and UNITA, did not try to stop the invasion. The FNLC failed to capture Kolwezi, Zaire's economic heartland, but took Kasaji, and Mutshatsha. Zairian troops were defeated without difficulty and the FNLC continued to advance. Mobutu appealed to William Eteki of Cameroon, chairman of the Organization of African Unity, for assistance on April 2. Eight days later, the French government responded to Mobutu's plea and airlifted 1,500 Moroccan troops into Kinshasa. This troop force worked in conjunction with the Zairian army and the FNLA of Angola with air cover from Egyptian pilots flying French Mirage fighter aircraft to beat back the FNLC. The counter-invasion force pushed the last of the militants, along with a number of refugees, into Angola and Zambia in April.

Mobutu accused the Angolan government, as well as the Cuban and Soviet governments, of complicity in the war. While Neto did support the FNLC, the Angolan government's support came in response to Mobutu's continued support for Angola's anti-communists. The Carter administration, unconvinced of Cuban involvement, responded by offering a meager $15 million-worth of non-military aid. American timidity during the war prompted a shift in Zaire's foreign policy from the US to France, which became Zaire's largest supplier of arms after the intervention. Neto and Mobutu signed a border agreement on July 22, 1977.

=== Nitista revolt ===
Neto's interior minister, Nito Alves, had successfully put down Daniel Chipenda's Eastern Revolt and the Active Revolt during Angola's War of Independence. Factionalism within the MPLA became a major challenge to Neto's power by late 1975 and he gave Alves the task of once again clamping down on dissension. Alves shut down the Cabral and Henda committees while expanding his influence within the MPLA through his control of the nation's newspapers and state-run television. Alves visited the Soviet Union in October 1976. When he returned, Neto began taking steps to neutralize the threat he saw in the Nitistas, followers of Alves. Ten armored cars with the FAPLA's 8th Brigade broke into São Paulo prison at 4 a.m. on May 27, killing the prison warden and freeing more than 150 supporters, including 11 who had been arrested only a few days before. The brigade took control of the radio station in Luanda at 7 a.m. and announced their coup, calling themselves the MPLA Action Committee. The brigade asked citizens to show their support for the coup by demonstrating in front of the presidential palace. The Nitistas captured Bula and Dangereaux, generals loyal to Neto, but Neto had moved his base of operations from the palace to the Ministry of Defence in fear of such an uprising.

At the time, Cuba had already in place an agreement with Neto to receive approximately $1,000 per Cuban (in Angola) making the Angolan invasion a very profitable venture for the Cubans. Any upset to this venture would not be tolerated by the Cubans.

For this reason in a blatant intervention in domestic affairs of Angola, Cuban troops retook the palace at Neto's request and marched to the radio station. After an hour of fighting, the Cubans succeeded and proceeded to the barracks of the 8th brigade, recaptured by 1:30 p.m. While the Cuban force captured the palace and radio station, the Nitistas kidnapped seven leaders within the government and the military, shooting and killing six.

While Cuban soldiers actively helped Neto put down the coup, Alves and Neto both believed the Soviet Union supported Neto's ouster. Raúl Castro sent an additional four thousand troops to prevent further dissension within the MPLA's ranks and met with Neto in August in a display of solidarity. In contrast, Neto's distrust in the Soviet leadership increased and relations with the USSR worsened.

The oil producing exclave of Cabinda (located in Zaire/DRC) was a separate colony of Portugal that was for a short while place the governorship of the Portuguese Angolan governor. At the time of liberation, Cabinda was lumped into the Angolan custodianship and quickly absorbed by the MPLA as being part of Angola. The self-determination rights of the people of Cabinda, a geographically separate nation, was ignored by the MPLA and Cuban government. The Popular Movement for the Liberation of Cabinda, a Cabindan separatist rebel group, attacked a Cuban base near Tshiowa on August 11. The Cuban forces repelled any attacks on the oil fields of Cabinda and placed over 2,000 soldiers guarding oil production facilities owned by American companies creating a stark irony in the Cuban publicized propaganda.

=== 1978 ===
UNITA released a communiqué from Paris on November 13, 1978, detailing an anti-UNITA attack by 20,000 troops from Portugal, Cuba, Katanga, East Germany, and the MPLA.

=== 1980s ===
Cuba's relationship with Angola altered, the military command would transfer to the Soviets and the Cubans would focus on a more humanitarian and infrastructure program. During this time period Cuba implemented some impressive assistance to the MPLA in setting the foundation for a true Marxist state with communist values. The Cubans brought over doctors, teachers and engineers. Cuban medical assistance was so great that Spanish became known as the language of medicine in Angola. This key aspect of Angolan-Cuban relations still lasts to this day. Besides providing teachers to Angola, Cuba also provided bursaries for Angolans to study at Cuban universities. A clear positive and good intention was shown by Cuba in the sectors of medicine and health. Unfortunately Cuban intervention in the other sectors (agriculture and civil infrastructure) was undermined by the Marxist ideals and Cuban experiments. Cuban sugarcane is bigger and has a higher yield than Angolan sugarcane. Based on this simple principle, Cuba exterminated all Angolan sugarcane and substituted it with the 'better' Cuban sugarcane. Unfortunately, the Cuban sugarcane did not adapt to the Angolan environment and failed. It a fell swoop, Cuba had wiped out all Angolan sugarcane. With the Angolan sugarcane industry decimated, Cuba cannibalized the Angolan sugarcane mills and took the parts back to Cuba. Cuba built many houses as part of a widespread housing program using an industrialized construction technique that was also experimental and turned to failure. Today, Angolans refer to the dilapidated houses as the "Cuban Cages".

The accumulation of small incidents began to strain the relationship between Cuba and Angola: Cuban forces were to be seen as the saviors of Angola and were given special privileges over Angolans. Privileges which the Cubans appear to have abused. Any minor dispute would normally be resolved in favour of the Cubans, and a growing sense that Angolans were second class citizens in their own country raised resentment. After all the Angolans originally fought to gain liberation from the Portuguese colonials only to be subjected to a Cuban system of discrimination.

Probably the biggest downfall in the relation between Angola and Cuba (during this period) was the systematic plundering of Angolan property by the Cubans. Under the Marxist principle all property belonged to the state. As an example, under the definition of 'all property' domestic cars that one would normally believe to belong to individuals now belong to the state. However, due to the conflict and social upheavals many Portuguese citizens fled Angola, abandoning their cars. Many high ranking Cuban soldiers came across these abandoned cars and helped themselves to them. Senior Angolan officials were insulted to find many Angolan cars with Angolan license plates driving the streets of Havana. Many similar incidents such as the Cuban plundering of rare woods in Cabinda began to show strain in the relationship between Angola and Cuba.

The relationship between Angola, Cuba and the Soviet Union was ironically heavily funded by sales of oil to capitalistic countries. Both the Soviet Union and Angola were large scale exporters of oil providing funds for the various Cuban initiatives. During the years 1984 to 1988 the world price of oil tumbled (eventually leading to the collapse of the Soviet Union) and Angola's ability to fund Cuban ventures was severely cut to the point that Angola could no longer afford to pay for any foreign assistance and went into debt. With no money to go around and internal strains between the Angolans and Cubans, by the mid to late 1980s the bi-lateral relationship changed dramatically. For Cuba there were no longer any revenues from Angola but instead a very expensive operation of funding a military and civilian force in Angola. Cuba was also suffering their own hardships based on a command economy that had systematically become too expensive to run. Although the two sides still had a respectful relationship the soon departure of the Cuban occupiers was a foregone conclusion.

The imminent collapse of the Soviet Union lead to a desperate attempt to severely weaken the military foes in preparation for the MPLA to 'go it alone'. Under the leadership of the Soviet General, in late 1987 an attack was planned to break the back of UNITA. The attack would be launched from Cuito Cuanavale and make a move on UNITA's stronghold of Mavinga. The Cuban military correctly raised concern on the whole attack process as the Cubans had made a similar attempt in 1985 when the South African forces intervened and the entire attack turned into a disastrous failure. Nonetheless, the attack proceeded and as in 1985, the South Africans intervened and the attack was again a disastrous failure with the MPLA/Soviet troops being halted at the Lomba river by the South Africans. It was at the battle at the Lomba river that MPLA realized that impending departure of both the Cubans and Soviets would leave them alone and severely weakened. The MPLA decided to enter negotiations with the prime objective of getting the South Africans out of Angola and hopefully battle UNITA without foreign intervention. In a number of follow-up battles, the South African and UNITA troops drove the MPLA/Soviet troops back to Cuito Cuanavale and besieged the town of Cuito Cuanavale.

Fidel Castro realized that his dream of having Angola as a strong Marxist state in Africa and a spring board to spread Marxism in Africa would quickly evaporate if he did not lend assistance to MPLA. Castro reacted in support of the MPLA by sending 35,000 troops to the Cuito Cuanavale stage. However, peace negotiations had progressed and Cuba needed to become a participant in the negotiations to ensure at least a form of honourable departure from Angola. With Cuban presence at the table, the negotiations became known as the "Tripartite Accord".

Cuba attempted to break the siege of Cuito Cuanavale but found that the South African G5 Howitzer gun had created havoc, severely disrupting the supply route to Cuito (the supply route became known as the "Road of Death"). Castro turned his troops southward and made a direct advance on the Namibian border in an attempt of a last honourable attack. Again the South African G5 gun was used to terrifying results halting the advance. Without consulting the MPLA and the Soviets, Castro launched his MiG fighter jets, initially trying to remove the G5 guns, but on the same flight, they turned and attacked the Caluque hydro scheme. This attack almost undermined the peace negotiations and again strained the relationship between Cuba and Angola (and the Soviet Union).

Soon after the negotiations and the accord was reached, Cuba implemented their prescribed program of removing their troops from Angola which was completed by May 1991.

Although Cuba bargained hard for various concessions, related to the Angola situation there were some instrumental points that Cuba conceded:

1. Their support for the (then) Marxist-leaning African National Congress (ANC) would stop.
2. UNITA would be allowed to get support from the US after the process was complete.

Cuba also had to concede on certain points pertaining to Namibia and South Africa (which are not part of this topic).

The two concession points made by Cuba and the MPLA allowed South Africa to deal with the ANC in its own way and allowed the US to continue support to UNITA in producing a power shift once the foreign forces had left Angola.

=== Post-Peace Accord relationship ===
With the Peace Accord complete, the South African forces withdrew from Angola and went about enacting the democratic hand over of Namibia. Cuba withdrew all its troops and now faced the full brunt of the collapse of the Soviet Union. Having focused so much of its finite resources to the Second Revolution primarily in Africa with the main focus on Angola, Cuba's own economy was in a state of tatters.

For Cuba

With no revenue from the Soviets and no revenue from Angola, Cuba's economy imploded and Cuba entered, what Fidel Castro called the "Special Period in Peace Time" and a 34% drop in their GDP.

For Angola

Initially with Cuba, the Soviets and South Africa out of Angola, the MPLA thought they could use the left over advanced Soviet Military equipment and deliver the final blow to UNITA on their own. None of the parties contended with the USA providing support to UNITA, causing a power shift. This time the MPLA no longer had a major backer, they faced a military impasse and a world where multi-party democracy with Capitalistic economies were showing success. The MPLA realized that a new political and economic vision was needed to answer both their military woes and their economic aspirations. At the third congress of the People the MPLA decided that the Marxist–Leninist policy had brought more suffering than relief and was dropped. The MPLA changed their course and opened the door for a multi-party democracy based on a capitalistic economy. Renewed peace negotiations were held with UNITA which this time lead to an election. However following the Halloween Massacre UNITA rejected the election results and turned to arms. UNITA and other opposition parties claimed the elections were rigged. However this time the USA did not support UNITA and both parties returned to war. The MPLA did not turn to Cuba for renewed assistance but in a twist of irony, the MPLA government employed the services of a South African mercenary group "Executive Outcomes" to help fight UNITA. The MPLA as an elected government fully recognized in the entire international community teamed up with military forces from their previous foe to oust UNITA. With superior training and bushwar tactics from the South Africans coupled with the impressive Soviet military weaponry still in stock, the MPLA were able to eventually drive UNITA back. The eventual defection of one of Savimbi's senior generals also helped to corner and eradicate Savimbi.
