= World Possible =

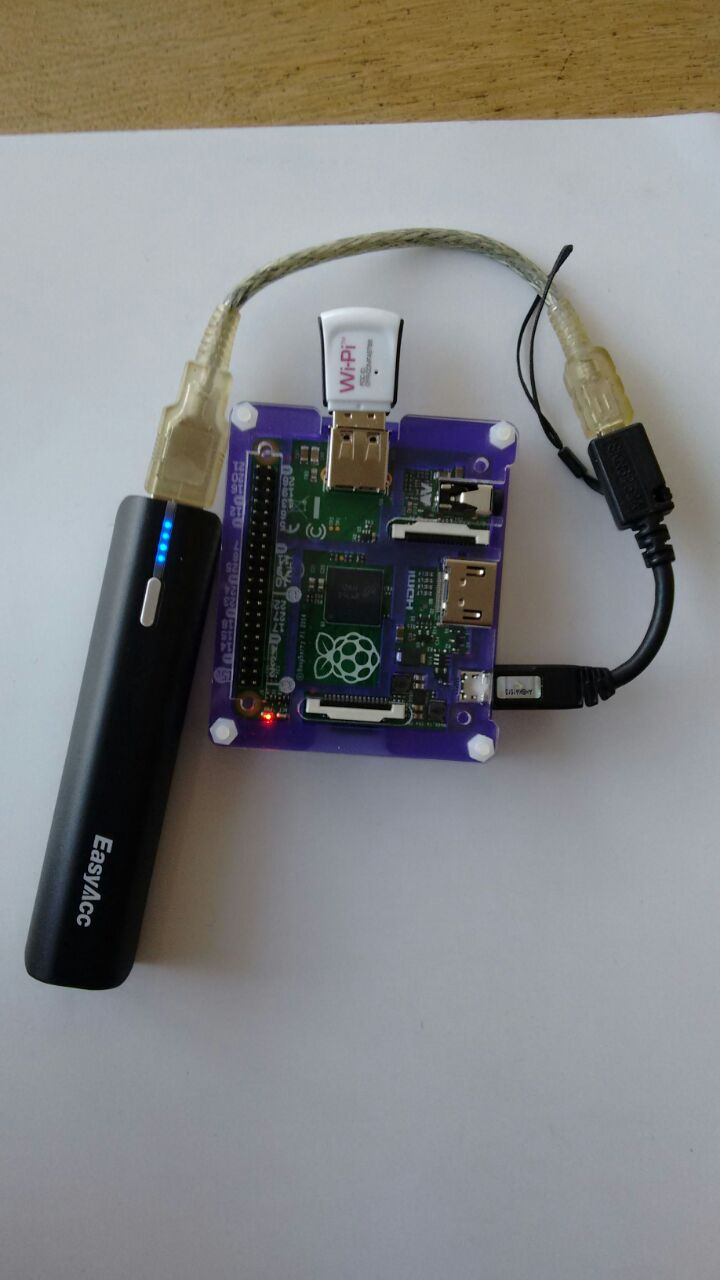
Raspberry Pi using RACHEL, powered by a battery

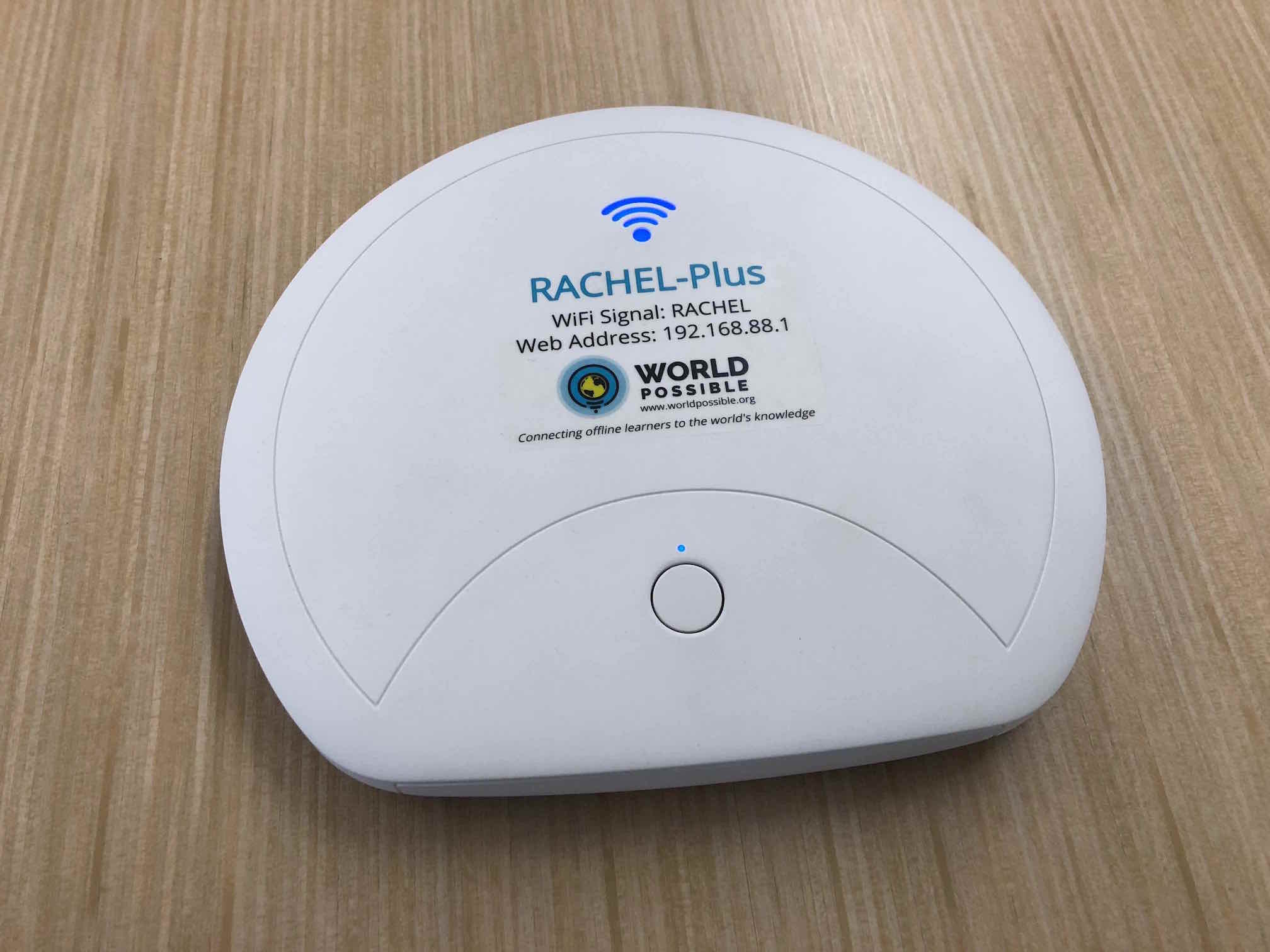
Remote Area Community Hotspot for Education & Learning (RACHEL-Plus) model released by World Possible in June 2018.

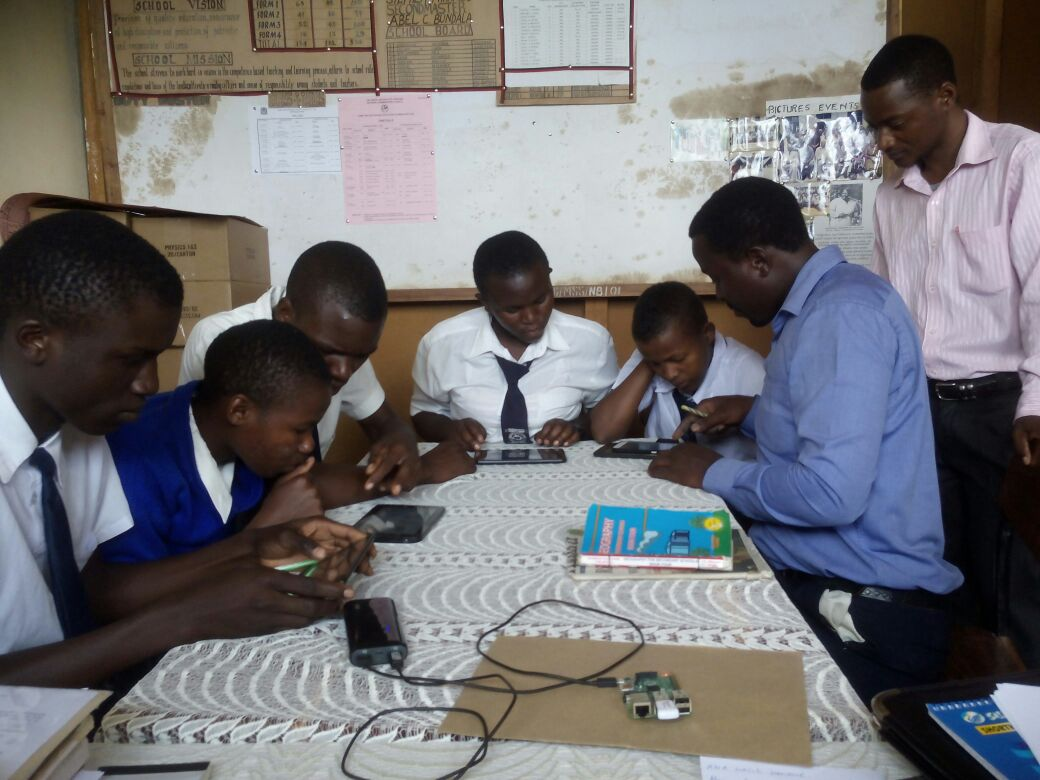
Students in a Tanzanian high school without electricity using RACHEL on a donated Raspberry Pi computer.

World Possible is a non-profit organization based in California with a mission to connect offline learners to the world's knowledge.

== Devices ==
World Possible makes and distributes RACHEL (Remote Area Community Hotspot for Education and Learning), a server/router that hosts offline free educational content such as Khan Academy, Wikipedia, Project Gutenberg and others via Wi-Fi on a Raspberry Pi or Intel CAP computer. RACHEL is designed so that students or schools that do not have internet connections, but may already have devices (such as cellphones, tablets, laptops or desktops) that can receive data via wi-fi, can access educational content via RACHEL as a server. Content has been tailored to meet locally-relevant demand.
