= Vedastus Kyalakishaija Kyaruzi =

Tanzanian diplomat and politician

ASAS DARUL HUDA

Permanent Representative of Tanzania to the United Nations
- In office 1961 – 1962 July
- Succeeded by: Asanterabi Zephaniah Nsilo Swai

Personal details
- Born: February 21, 1921 Bukoba, Tanzania
- Died: May 23, 2012 (aged 91) Dar es Salaam
- Spouse: married 1949, Dorothy Gayita
- Children: one daughter one son
- Education: 1930–33 Kashasha Primary School.; 1933–34 Mugana Primary School.; 1934–39 Kajunguti Primary School.; 1940–1942 St Mary's Secondary School, Tabora.; 1942–1949 Makarere College, Kampala.
- Alma mater: He studied at the White Fathers School at Kajunguti, Bukoba, St Mary's Tabora, and Makerere University College, where he obtained a degree in Medicine.; Attended the University of Edinburgh, was awarded a Diploma in Public Health, and in 1964 was admitted (in absentia) as a Member qua Physician of the Royal College of Physicians and Surgeons of Glasgow.; 1958–59 University of Edinburgh, Scotland.; 1949 diploma in Medicine and Surgery.; 1959 diploma in Public Health.

Vedastus Kyalakishaija Kyaruzi (1921-2012) was a Tanzanian diplomat and politician.

He attended the University of Edinburgh in which he was awarded a Diploma in Public health, and in 1964 he was admitted (in absentia) a Member qua Physician of the Royal College of Physicians and Surgeons of Glasgow.

- He played an active role in Tanganyika African Association and the formation of Tanganyika African National Union (TANU).
- From 1949 to 1961, he was government medical officer.
- From 1950 to 1951, he was president of the Tanganyika African Association, before giving him the seat to Julius Nyerere, and was posted to Kingolwira Prison Hospital near Morogoro then to the even more remote Nzega.
- From 1961 to July 1962, he was the first Tanganyikan Permanent Representative to the United Nations.
- From 1962 to 1963, after independence he was Permanent Secretary, External Affairs and Defence.
- From 1963 to 1969, he was UNICEF director for Africa south of Sahara.
