= Ombeni Sefue =

Tanzanian diplomat

Ambassador Ombeni Sefue

Chief Secretary to the President
- In office 31 December 2011 – 6 March 2016
- President: John Pombe Magufuli
- Preceded by: Phillemon Luhanjo
- Succeeded by: John William Kijazi

Permanent Representative of Tanzania to the United Nations
- In office 31 August 2010 – December 2011
- Preceded by: Augustine Mahiga
- Succeeded by: Tuvako Manongi

Tanzanian Ambassador to the United States
- In office 15 June 2007 – 14 August 2010
- President: Jakaya Kikwete

Tanzanian High Commissioner to Canada
- In office October 2005 – June 2007

Personal Assistant to the President
- In office May 1993 – September 2005
- President: Ali Hassan Mwinyi (1993–95); Benjamin Mkapa (1995–2005)

Personal details
- Born: 26 August 1954 (age 72) Same District, Tanganyika
- Spouse: Anita
- Children: 2
- Education: Mzumbe University; ISS (MA); CFR (PGDip)
- Profession: Diplomat

Ombeni Yohana Sefue (born 26 August 1954) is a former Tanzanian diplomat. He was appointed as the Chief Secretary to the President of Tanzania on 31 December 2011. Previously he was the Permanent Representative of Tanzania to the United Nations.

== Honours ==
- Tanzania: Order of the United Republic of Tanzania (First Class), December 2012
