= Global Leadership Foundation =

The Global Leadership Foundation (GLF) is a non-profit, non-governmental organization consisting of a network of former heads of state/government and other distinguished leaders (GLF Members), who seek to assist developing countries in improving governance, bolstering democratic institutions, and resolving conflicts. The organization does so by arranging for GLF Members to provide confidential peer-to-peer advice to current heads of government, who are committed to peace, democracy, and development. The Global Leadership Foundation is active across the world, works via invitation from a head of government, and its work is confidential.

== Organization ==
The Global Leadership Foundation (GLF) was set up in 2004 by F. W. de Klerk as a network of former national leaders to advise newly-democratic countries on issues of governance and stability. GLF works discreetly on policy issues with these leaders. The initial members were Václav Havel, Quett Masire, and Aníbal Cavaco Silva.

Since its establishment in 2004, GLF's engagements have included advice on the following:

- Democratic institutions, effective governance, and transition from authoritarian rule
- Effective election management
- Regional and national security
- Political reconciliation and implementation of international agreements
- Tackling armed resistance movements and terrorist organizations
- Economic reform, resource management, and trade
- Access to humanitarian aid

In addition to the provision of direct but discreet advice on an ever-increasing range of topics to serving national leaders, GLF engages in the following:

- Active discussion of important global issues
- Proactive consideration of national crisis situations with international implications
- Dialogues with the heads of key multilateral institutions
- International conferences on topical issues
- Consultation and working with like-minded organizations

While GLF does not seek to publicize its work with world leaders, some visits are in the public domain, such as the 2011 visit to the Maldives by Cassam Uteem, the 2013 visit to Kenya by Joe Clark and Quett Masire, the 2014 and 2015 visits to Ghana by FW de Klerk, Quett Masire and Kaspar Villiger, and the mediation role Quett Masire played in negotiating a ceasefire agreement in Mozambique in 2016.

Upon de Klerk's death in late 2021, Helen Clark became the new GLF chair.

There are currently43 GLF Members. New members are selected by existing members.

The Foundation is supported by the GLF International Council, which consists of organizations and individuals who recognize the importance of GLF's work and support the foundation financially. A limit is placed on the size of each donation to preserve the foundation's independence.

GLF is registered in the Canton of Bern, Switzerland. It has two associate foundations: GLF (USA), a 501(c)(3) foundation registered in Delaware, US; and GLF (UK), a charity registered in England and Wales.

A recent publication by BBC documentary producer Giles Edwards titled "The Ex Men – How Our Former Presidents and Prime Ministers Are Still Changing the World" examines the many ways that GLF Members, amongst other former presidents and prime ministers, have played an important role in public life after leaving elected political office.
