= Asanterabi Zephaniah Nsilo Swai =

Tanzanian politician (1925–1994)

Minister of Commerce and Industry of Tanzania
- In office 1960–1961

Minister of Health and Labour of Tanzania
- In office January – March 1962

Permanent Representative of Tanzania to the United Nations
- In office July 1962 – December 1962
- Preceded by: Vedastus Kyalakishaija Kyaruzi
- Succeeded by: Erasto Andrew Mbwana Mang'enya

Personal details
- Born: 20 April 1925 Moshi, Tanzania Kilimanjaro
- Died: 1 January 1994 (aged 68)
- Education: He received his school education at the Moshi Secondary School. He was trained as a teacher at Makerere University in Uganda and taught at Alliance High School (Kenya). Till 1954 he was second principal of the Lyamongu Secondary School in Moshi.
- Alma mater: University of Bombay, India, University of Delhi, India;

Asanterabi Zephaniah Nsilo Swai (1925–1994) was a pioneer Tanzanian politician of Chagga heritage.

- From 1952 to 1954 he was assistant warden at the Makerere University.
- From 1958 to 1960 he was general manager, Meru Cooperative Union and was provincial chairman, Tanganyika African National Union (TANU) of the Northern Province.
- From 1960 to 1962 he was chairman, TANU Economics and Social Development Committee.
- From 1962 to 1967 he was national treasurer TANU.
- In 1960 he was appointed member of the Legislative Council.
- From 1960 to 1961 he was Minister of Commerce and Industry.
- From January to March 1962 he was Minister of Health and Labor.
- From July to December 1962 he was Minister without Portfolio and Permanent Representative of Tanzania to the United Nations
- From 1962 to 1963 he was Minister of Development Planning Tanganyika.
- In 1962 Nelson Mandela was his guest.
- From 1964 to 1965 he was Minister of State, President's Office Directorate of Planning.
- On October 13, 1965 he held a speech before the 1360th meeting of United Nations General Assembly
- From September 1965 to March 1967, he was Minister of Industries, Mineral Resources and Power,
- From March 1967 to June 1967, he was Minister of Economic Affairs and Development Planning and chairman of the National Development Corporation.
- In 1967 he was Minister of East African Affairs.
- From 1967 to 1968 he was East African Community Minister for Communications, Research and Social Services and member, East African Legislative Assembly.

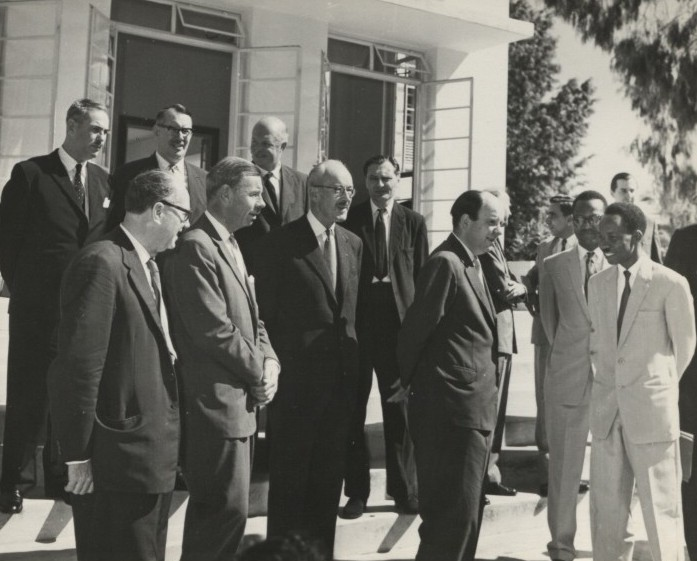
The British Secretary of State for the Colonies, Iain Macleod, on the second day of his first visit to Tanganyika, 18 December 1959, meets Tanganyika Government ministers and political leaders. Right to left, front row: Ernest Albert Vasey, Minister of Finance; Mr John Fletcher-Cooke, Deputy Governor; Richard Turnbull (colonial governor), Governor of Tanganyika; Iain Macleod; Julius Nyerere; back row: John Sydney Richard Cole, Attorney General, William Bonnar Leslie Monson (1912–1993), Under-Secretary, Colonial Office; next two unknown; on right, behind Julius Nyerere, Mr Nsilo Swai (later a minister),
