= Brenda Hollis =

American lawyer

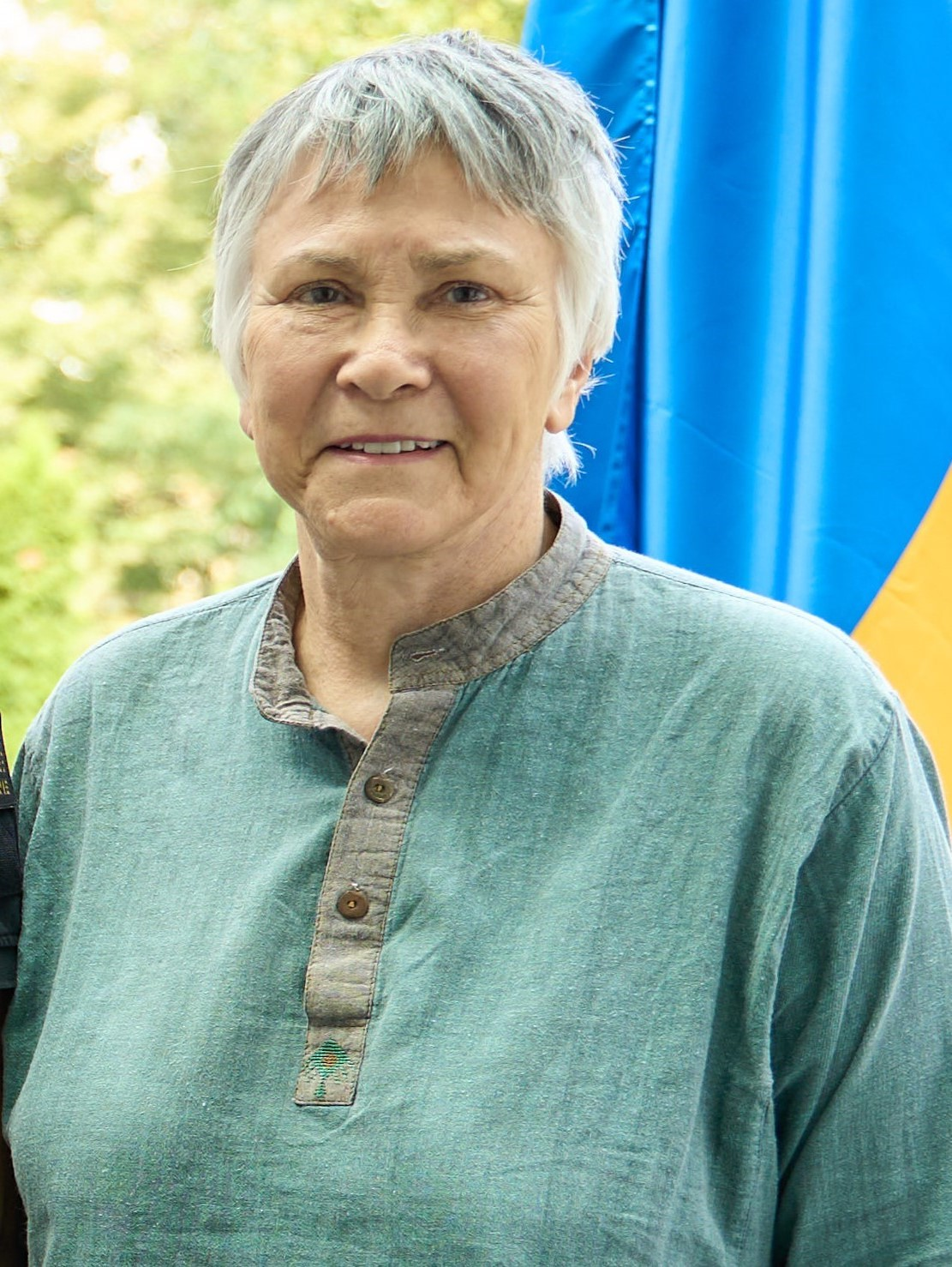
Brenda Hollis in Kyiv in 2023

Brenda J. Hollis is an American jurist who is the Principal Trial Lawyer in charge of the Ukraine investigation at the International Criminal Court.

Previously, she served as Prosecutor of the Special Court for Sierra Leone after being appointed by United Nations Secretary-General Ban Ki-moon in February 2010, replacing Stephen Rapp. Hollis was the Chief Prosecutor at the Special Court and served as the lead prosecutor in the trial and appeal of the case against Charles Taylor, the former President of Liberia.

Hollis had worked as a consultant to the Prosecutor of the Special Court in 2002 and 2003, taking part in the initial investigations and providing advice on the requirements of international criminal law. In 2006, she again worked as a consultant for the Special Court, amending the indictment against Charles Taylor and preparing the case for trial.

Hollis subsequently served as the Prosecutor of the Residual Special Court for Sierra Leone, which replaced the Special Court in December 2013; currently James Johnson, an adjunct professor at Case Western Reserve University School of Law, serves as the Chief Prosecutor for the Residual Special Court for Sierra Leone. She also served as the Reserve International Co-Prosecutor for the Extraordinary Chambers in the Courts of Cambodia (the Khmer Rouge Tribunal), and works as a consultant in international criminal law and procedure.

Hollis worked as a legal consultant for judges, prosecutors and investigators of the Indonesian ad hoc Human Rights Courts and the Special Tribunal for Iraq. She worked with NGO groups to prepare submissions to the Prosecutor of the ICC, and providing technical assistance to the Extraordinary Chambers in the Courts of Cambodia.

Prior to her legal consultancy work, Hollis worked in a variety of capacities in the Office of the Prosecutor at the International Criminal Tribunal for the Former Yugoslavia, organizing, preparing and participating in the prosecution of its first cases, including the Tadic case - the first litigated case in an international tribunal since Nuremberg, and the Furundzija case, the first case to charge sexual violence as torture.

Hollis served as a US Air Force Officer for 22 years. She retired with the rank of Colonel.

Hollis has a Juris Doctor from the University of Denver and a Bachelor of Arts from Bowling Green State University. She has received honorary degrees from Case Western School of Law and Bowling Green State University.
