= Arusha Secondary School =

School in Arusha, Tanzania

Coordinates: 03°22′11″S 36°41′17″E

Information
- Gender: Girls
- Enrollment: 800 (2018)

Arusha Secondary School is a secondary school in Arusha, Tanzania, the first school in Tanzania to be headed by a Tanzanian woman educated in the United States.

In 2018 the school had 800 female students.

== Notable alumni ==
- Mange Kimambi
