= Erasto Andrew Mbwana Mang'enya =

Permanent Representative of Tanzania to the United Nations
- In office April 17, 1963 – 1964
- Preceded by: Asanterabi Zephaniah Nsilo Swai
- Succeeded by: John Malecela

Personal details
- Born: April 17, 1915 (age 111) Mkuzi Village in Muheza District Tanga Region, German East Africa.
- Parent(s): He is the eldest son of Canon Henry and Mary Eleanor Mang'enya
- Education: From 1919 to 1933 he went through a number of schools in the Anglican Diocese of Zanzibar and Tanga. The schools he attended were Mkuzi, Magila, Kiwanda, and finally Minaki Teacher Training School.; In 1934 he joined King's College Budo another Anglican institution, where he sat for the Makerere College Entrance Examination.; From 1935 to 1937 he was at Makerere College.

Erasto Andrew Mbwana Mang'enya (17 April 1915 – 4 April 1991) was a Tanganyikan/Tanzanian diplomat and politician.

- He was a chief of the Bondei people, from the Usambara Mountains in north – eastern Tanzania. Before becoming chief of the Bondei, Mang’enya was head teacher at Old Moshi Secondary School. He was, one of the earliest Tanganikans to receive a university degree, had a strong involvement with Bondei nationalism in the late fifties, yet was successfully able to rewrite his life history to make an accommodation with Tanganyikan nationalism, downplaying the ethnic component in favour of his role within the civil service
- In 1938 he entered Tanganyika's Department of Education, a fore-runner of Tanzania's Ministry of Education, and worked at the following Secondary Schools:
- 1938—1943 Malangali;
- 1943—1947 Moshi;
- 1947—1952 Tanga;
- 1953–1957 Tabora;
- In 1958 he taught at Songea Secondary School.
- At the end of 1958, Mang'enya was elected Mtema (Chief) of the Wabondei of Muheza District.
- In 1960 he entered Parliament on Tanganyika African National Union Party ticket and was elected Deputy Speaker.
- In 1962 he was appointed Junior Minister in the Ministry of Communications, Power & Works of the Government of newly independent Tanganyika.
- In 1963 he was transferred to the Ministry of Foreign Affairs and was sent to New York as Tanganyika's Chief Delegate at the United Nations.
- From April 17, 1963 to 1964 he was permanent representative to the United Nations.
- From 1964 to 1965 he was minister of community development and national culture.

- In 1965 he became the first Chairman of the Tanzania's Permanent Commission of Enquiry (Ombudsman).
- In 1970 he was appointed Chairman of the Tribunal that heard appeals on Acquired Buildings.
- In 1972 he became again Chairman of the Permanent Commission of Enquiry.
- As a Chairman, he visited Australia, New Zealand and Israel.
- In 1967 he travelled to the Scandinavian countries, East Germany and visited the Soviet Union.

He was the Speaker of the National Assembly from November 1973 to November 1975.
