= Centre for Foreign Relations =

International relations school in Dar es Salaam, Tanzania

Coordinates: 6.8518326°S 39.2818683°E

Mozambique-Tanzania Centre for Foreign Relations
- Swahili: Chuo Cha Diplomasia
- Logo
- Motto: CFR For International Relations and Diplomatic Training
- Type: Public
- Established: 1978
- Chairperson: Ombeni Sefue
- Director: Amb.Kaniki
- Location: Dar es Salaam, Tanzania
- Website: www.cfr.ac.tz

The Mozambique-Tanzania Centre for Foreign Relations (CFR) is a higher learning institution in Dar es Salaam, Tanzania. It is located in the Kurasini ward.

== Introduction ==
The Centre for Foreign Relations is one of the high learning institutions in Tanzania. The CFR was established in 1978, as a result of an agreement between the governments of the United Republic of Tanzania and the Republic of Mozambique. The Centre has been incorporated in Immunities and Privileges Act No. 5 (1986). This incorporation conferred the Centre with the status of a Diplomatic Institution, a status which the Centre continues to enjoy to date.

The Centre was originally designed to train nationals of the two countries in the field of International Relations and Diplomacy. However, the expansion of foreign policy constituency and the demands of each country out of global changes enabled the Centre to admit students from other ministries, the private sector as well as other countries. New demanded programmes namely; Economic Diplomacy, Language and Communication Skills and Strategic Studies were introduced in the Centre’s training programmes. International Relations is an important discipline offered in other higher learning institutions. However, the CFR combines the study of International Relations and Diplomacy into one meaningful training programme. Moreover, the CFR offers a comprehensive programme for the low and medium level government and private sector personnel dealing with International Relations and Diplomacy.

The Vision of the Centre is to become a regional Centre of excellence in diplomatic and strategic studies.

The Mission of the Centre is to create and sustain national and regional capacity for conflict prevention, management, resolution and early warning systems through research and analysis, policy advocacy and advice, outreach and training.

== History ==
It was founded in 1978 by the governments of Mozambique and Tanzania in order to train foreign service officers of the two countries' foreign ministries.

== Academic Programmes ==
The Centre offers courses in International Relations and Diplomacy, Strategic Studies, Economic Diplomacy and Foreign Languages.

== Governance, management and administration ==
The Centre for Foreign Relations (CFR) is a corporate body with an established agreement and constitution. It has a Governing Council, the Director, Deputy Director - Academics, Research and Consultancy (DD – ARC), Deputy Director -Planning, Finance and Administration (DD - PFA) and various heads of departments.

== Notable alumni ==
- Ombeni Sefue, Tanzanian politician and diplomat
- Bonnah Kaluwa, Member of Parliament
- Raphael Maganga, CEO Tanzania Private Sector Federation
- Irene Tarimo, Researcher and Lecturer at OUT
- Wanu Hafidh Ameir, Tanzanian politician
- Hoyce Temu, Tanzanian diplomat
- Paul Siniga popular as "Rio Paul", Tanzanian fashion model.
