= Modest Mero =

Tanzanian diplomat

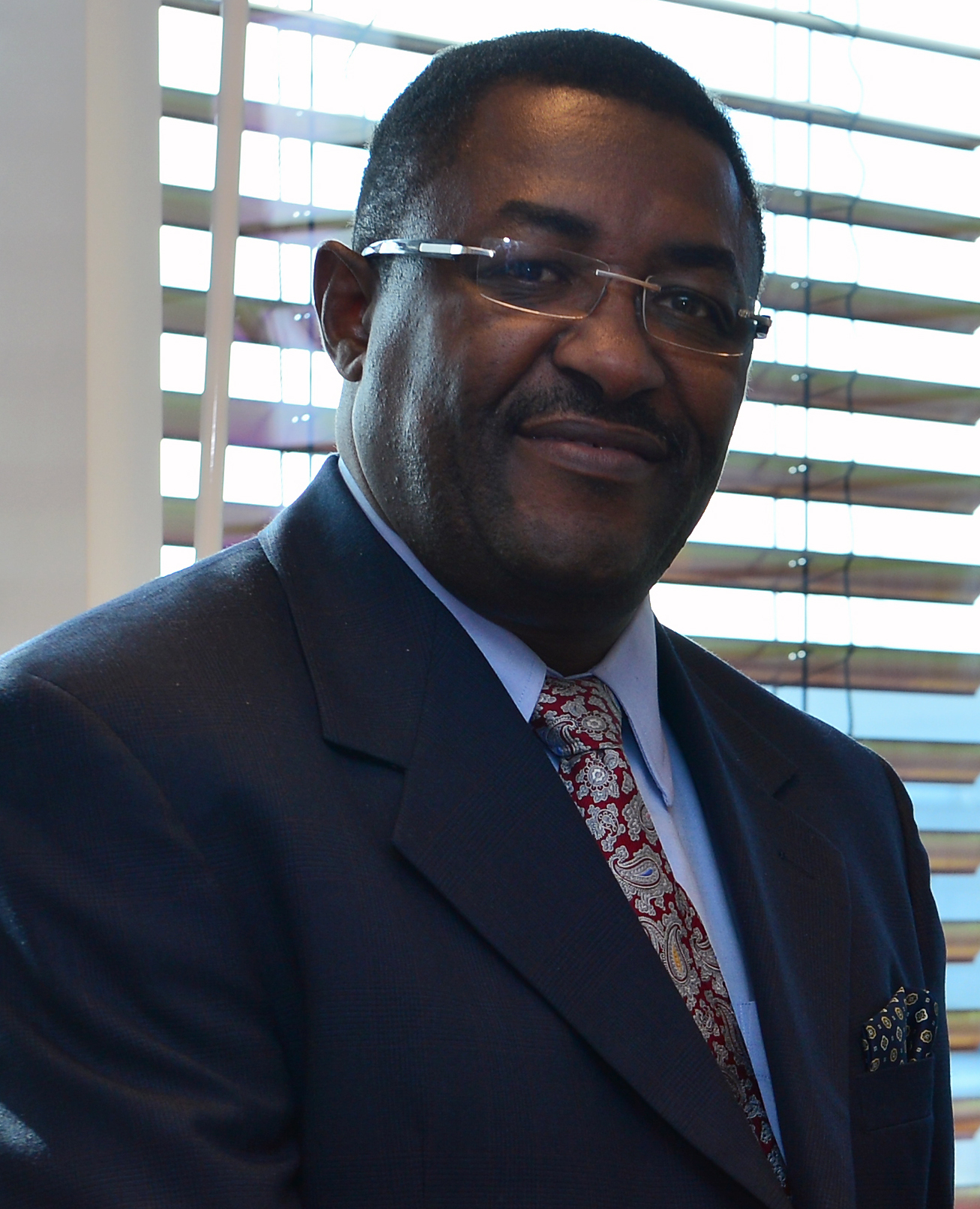

Permanent Representative of Tanzania to the United Nations Office at Geneva
- In office 2013–2015
- Appointed by: Jakaya Kikwete
- Preceded by: Matern Lumbanga

Personal details
- Education: University of Dar es Salaam; Strathclyde Business School

Modest Jonathan Mero is a Tanzanian diplomat. He has been Permanent Representative of Tanzania to the United Nations Office at Geneva since 2013 to 2015.
