= High commissioner (Commonwealth) =

Senior diplomatic position

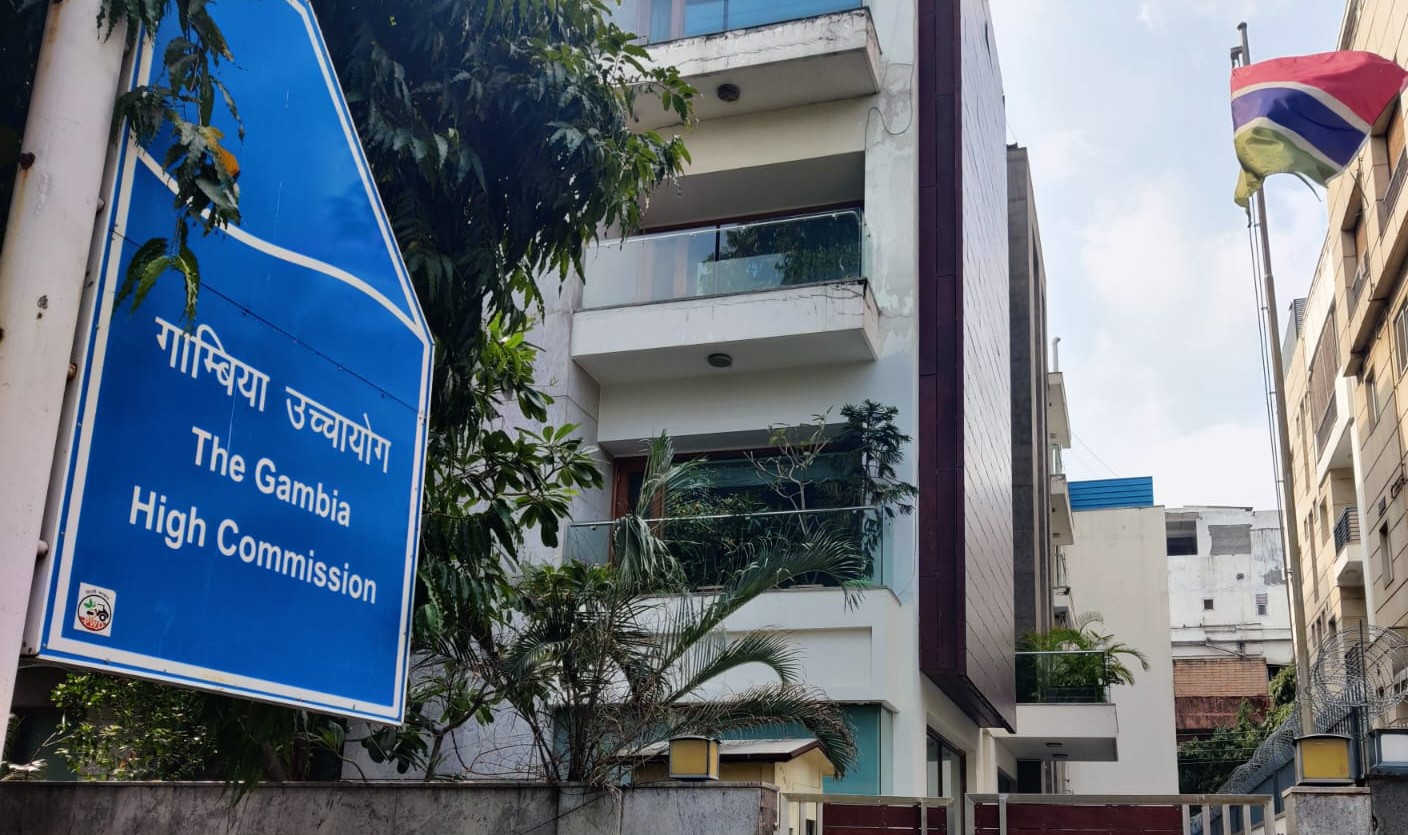
The high commission of The Gambia in New Delhi.

In the Commonwealth of Nations, a high commissioner is the senior diplomat, generally ranking as an ambassador, in charge of the diplomatic mission of one Commonwealth government to another. Instead of an embassy, the diplomatic mission is generally called a high commission.

== History ==
In the British Empire (most of the territories of which became the Commonwealth), high commissioners were envoys of the Imperial government appointed to manage protectorates or groups of territories not fully under the sovereignty of the British Crown, while Crown colonies (British sovereign territories) were normally administered by a governor, and the most significant possessions, large confederations and the self-governing dominions were headed by a governor-general.

For example, when Cyprus came under British administration in 1878 it remained nominally under the suzerainty of the Ottoman Empire. The representative of the British government and head of the administration was titled high commissioner until Cyprus became a Crown colony in 1925, when the incumbent high commissioner became the first governor. Another example were the high commissioners for Palestine.

A high commissioner could also be charged with the last phase of decolonisation, as in the Crown colony of the Seychelles, where the last governor became high commissioner in 1975, when self-rule under the Crown was granted, until 1976, when the archipelago became an independent republic within the Commonwealth.

=== Other usage ===
As diplomatic residents (as diplomatic ranks were codified, this became a lower class than ambassadors and high commissioners) were sometimes appointed to native rulers, high commissioners could likewise be appointed as British agents of indirect rule over native states. Thus high commissioners could be charged with managing diplomatic relations with native rulers and their states (analogous to the resident minister), and might have under them several resident commissioners or similar agents attached to each state.

In regions of particular importance, a commissioner-general was appointed to have control over several high commissioners and governors, e.g. the commissioner-general for South-East Asia had responsibility for Malaya, Singapore and British Borneo.

The first high commissioner of India to London was appointed in 1920; he had no political role, but mostly dealt with the business interests of the 'Indian Federation'. The first agent of the Indian government was appointed to South Africa in 1927.

Although not a dominion, the self-governing colony of Southern Rhodesia was represented in the United Kingdom by a high commission in London, while the United Kingdom similarly had a high commission in Salisbury. Following the Unilateral Declaration of Independence by the government of Ian Smith in 1965, the Rhodesian high commissioner, Andrew Skeen was expelled from London, while his British counterpart, Sir John Johnston, was withdrawn by the British government.

=== Governors also acting as high commissioners ===
The role of high commissioner for Southern Africa was coupled with that of British governor of the Cape Colony in the 19th century, giving the colonial administrator in question responsibility both for administering British possessions and relating to neighbouring Boer settlements.

Historically, the protectorates of Bechuanaland (now Botswana), Basutoland (now Lesotho) and Swaziland (now Eswatini) were administered as high commission territories by the Governor-General of the Union of South Africa who was also the British high commissioner for Bechuanaland, Basutoland, and Swaziland until the 1930s, with various local representatives, then by the British high commissioner (from 1961 ambassador) to South Africa, who was represented locally in each by a resident commissioner.

The British governor of the Crown colony of the Straits Settlements, based in Singapore, doubled as high commissioner of the Federated Malay States, and had authority over the resident-general in Kuala Lumpur, who in turn was responsible for the various residents appointed to the native rulers of the Malay states under British protection.

The Governor of Fiji doubled as High Commissioner for the Western Pacific from 1877 to 1953. The High Commissioner was responsible for the Western Pacific High Commission, which filled a variety of roles during its existence – initially exercising jurisdiction over British subjects in the Pacific Islands, then filling an administrative role in British protectorates via the appointment of resident commissioners and the Western Pacific High Court. After 1953, the High Commission was based in the British Solomon Islands Protectorate and was responsible for the government of the Solomon Islands until 1976.

The British High Commissioner to New Zealand is also ex-officio the governor of the Pitcairn Islands.

=== Dominions ===
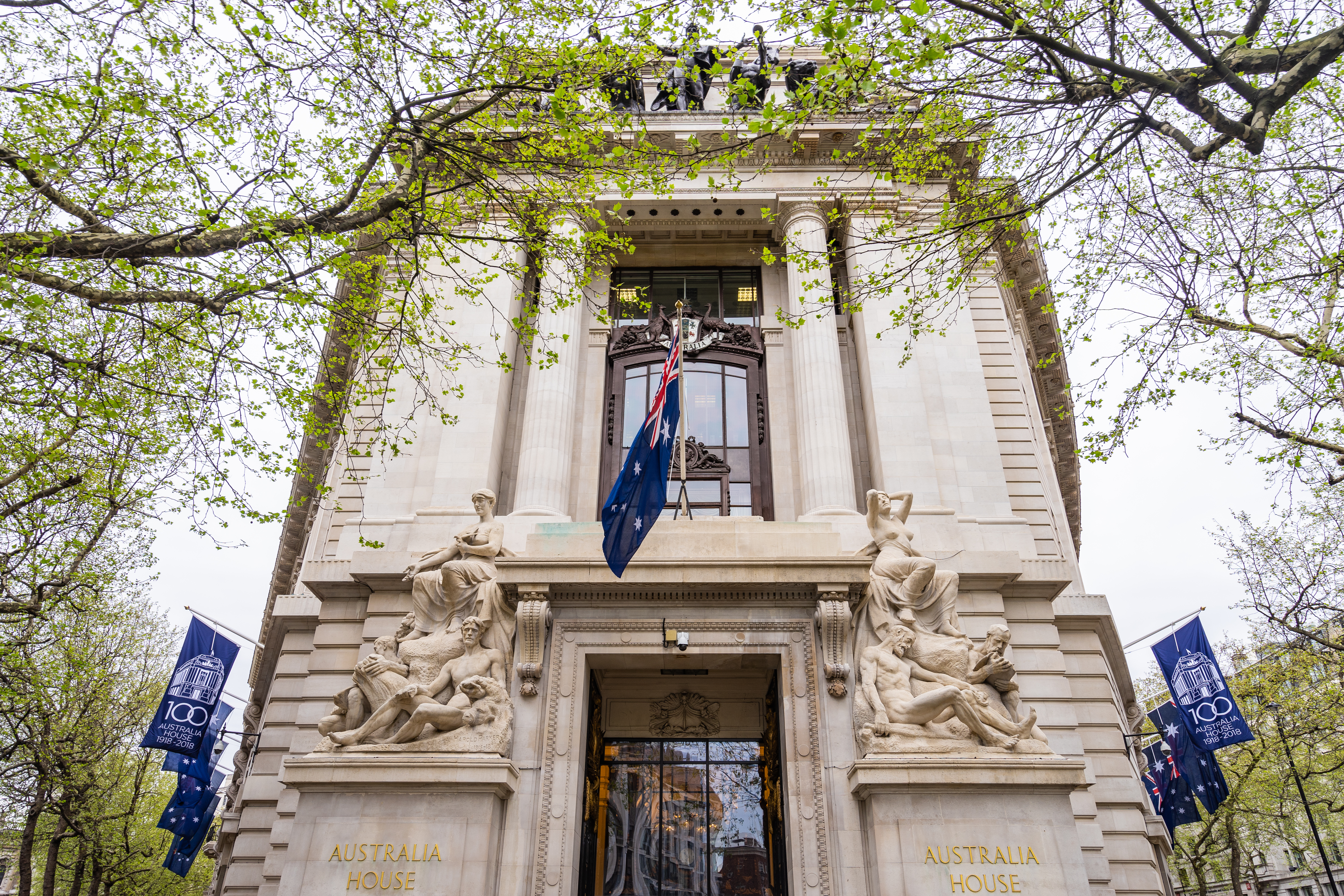
Australia House, home of the Australian high commission in London.

The first dominion high commissioner was appointed by Canada as its envoy in London. Previously, Sir John Rose, 1st Baronet, a Canadian businessman resident in London and former Canadian finance minister, had acted as the personal representative of the Canadian prime minister Sir John A. Macdonald, from 1869 to 1874 and then was given the title of Financial Commissioner from 1874 until 1880. Alexander Mackenzie, while he was prime minister, appointed Edward Jenkins a British Member of Parliament with links to Canada, to act as the government's representative in London as agent-general (1874–1876), followed by former Nova Scotia premier William Annand (1876–1878). When Macdonald returned to power in 1878 he requested to elevate the position of financial commissioner to resident minister, but was denied the request by the British government who instead offered to allow the designation of high commissioner. The Canadian government appointed Alexander Tilloch Galt as the first high commissioner of Canada to the United Kingdom in 1880.

New Zealand appointed a high commissioner in 1905, in place of a resident agent-general who had been appointed since 1871. Australia did the same in 1910, and South Africa in 1911.

The British government continued not to appoint high commissioners to the Dominions, holding that the British government was already represented by the relevant governor-general or governor. This arrangement began to create problems after the First World War with Dominions expecting a greater degree of control over their external and foreign affairs and beginning to challenge the constitutional role of their governors-general. In Canada, matters came to a head during the King–Byng affair of 1926, when the governor-general refused the advice of the Canadian prime minister to dissolve parliament and call elections, as would normally apply under the Westminster system. The incident led to the Balfour Declaration made at the Imperial Conference of 1926 that established that governors-general in the independent Dominions were not the representatives of the United Kingdom government but the personal representatives of the monarch. In 1930, Australia broke another tradition by insisting that the monarch act on the advice of the Australian prime minister in the appointment of the governor-general, and insisted on the appointment of Sir Isaac Isaacs, the first Australian-born person to serve in the office. The practice became the norm throughout the Commonwealth. The first British high commissioner to a dominion was appointed in 1928 to Canada. South Africa received a British high commissioner in 1930; Australia in 1936; and New Zealand in 1939.

The first high-ranking official envoy from one dominion to another was appointed by South Africa to Canada in 1938. Yet, because of various procedural complications, only in 1945 was South African envoy to Canada designated officially as high commissioner. New Zealand appointed a high commissioner to Canada in 1942, and a high commissioner to Australia in 1943.

In 1973, the then Australian Prime Minister, Gough Whitlam, proposed that the title be replaced with that of ambassador, but other Commonwealth members in Asia, Africa and the Caribbean indicated a preference for keeping the separate title and status of high commissioner, and the matter was not pursued further.

== Current practice ==
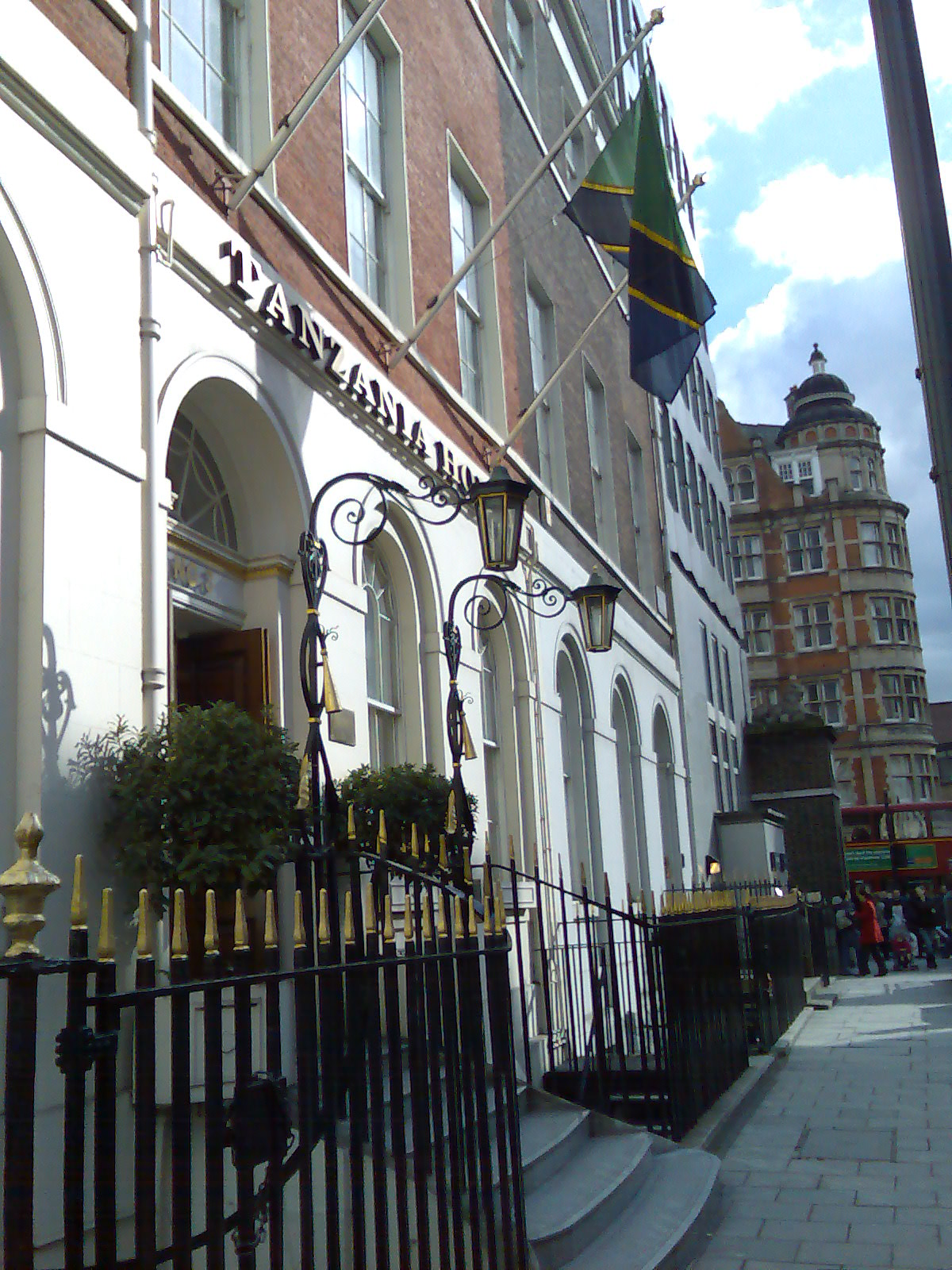
The Tanzanian High Commission in London. Tanzania and the United Kingdom are both members of the Commonwealth of Nations.

The term is used across all 56 member states of the Commonwealth of Nations, as diplomatic relations between these countries are traditionally at a governmental level rather than at the Head of State level, as is otherwise common. This is because traditionally these Commonwealth states shared a head of state, the Monarch of the United Kingdom (currently Charles III). In diplomatic usage, a high commissioner is considered equivalent in rank and role to an ambassador, and carries the full title of "High Commissioner Extraordinary and Plenipotentiary".

A high commissioner from one Commonwealth state to another carries a simple and often informal letter of introduction from one head of government (prime minister) to that of another, host country, while ambassadors carry formal letters of credence from their head of state addressed to the host country's head of state. The difference in accreditation is also reflected in the formal titles of envoys to Commonwealth and non-Commonwealth states: e.g., British high commissioners to the Commonwealth countries are formally titled "The High Commissioner for His Majesty's Government in the United Kingdom", whereas British ambassadors to non-Commonwealth countries are known as "His Britannic Majesty's Ambassador".

For historical reasons, high commissioners are also appointed even in the case of republics in the Commonwealth and indigenous monarchies (e.g. the kingdoms of Tonga, Eswatini, etc., who have monarchs other than the reigning British monarch) within the Commonwealth. In this case, letters of commission are usually issued by one head of state and presented to the other. However, some Commonwealth governments may choose to use the more informal method of issuing prime-ministerial letters of introduction, while other governments have opted instead for letters of credence.

Instead of embassies, the diplomatic missions of Commonwealth countries are called high commissions, although it is possible for a country to appoint a high commissioner without having a permanent mission in the other country: e.g. the British high commissioner in Suva, Fiji, is also accredited as high commissioner to Kiribati, Tuvalu and Tonga. Zimbabwe, as a Commonwealth country, traditionally had high commissioners in other Commonwealth countries. When it withdrew from the Commonwealth, it changed the style of its high commissions to embassies.

Outside the capital, practice is less standard. Subordinate deputy high commissioners or assistant high commissioners may be appointed instead of consuls-general, with the mission being known as a "deputy high commission" or "assistant high commission", for example the British Deputy High Commission in Chennai, India, and the Indian Assistant High Commission in Mombasa, Kenya. Historically, in British colonies, independent Commonwealth countries were represented by commissions. For example, Canada, Australia and New Zealand maintained commissions in Singapore, while following its independence in 1947, India established commissions in Kenya, Trinidad and Tobago, and Mauritius which became high commissions on independence.

Similarly, when Hong Kong was under British administration, Canada, Australia New Zealand India, Malaysia and Singapore were represented by commissions, but following the transfer of sovereignty to China in 1997, these were replaced by consulates-general, as in other non-capital cities in non-Commonwealth countries, with the last commissioner becoming the first consul-general. Canada formerly had a commissioner to Bermuda, although this post was held by the consul-general to New York City, but there is now an honorary Canadian consulate on the island.

Despite the differences in terminology, Commonwealth high commissioners have, since 1948, enjoyed the same diplomatic rank and precedence as ambassadors of foreign heads of state, and in some countries are accorded privileges not enjoyed by foreign ambassadors. For example, the British Sovereign receives high commissioners before ambassadors, and sends a coach and four horses to fetch new high commissioners to the palace, whereas new ambassadors get only two horses. High commissioners also attend important ceremonies of state, such as the annual Remembrance Sunday service at The Cenotaph in Whitehall (commemorating Commonwealth war dead) and royal weddings and funerals.

== See also ==
- Vienna Convention on Consular Relations
- List of ambassadors and high commissioners of Australia
- List of ambassadors and high commissioners of Canada
- List of ambassadors and high commissioners to India
- List of ambassadors and high commissioners to and from New Zealand
- List of ambassadors and high commissioners to the United Kingdom
- List of heads of missions of Tanzania
