= Tanzanian nationality law =

Tanzania Citizenship Act

Parliament of Tanzania
- Long title: Tanzania Citizenship Act No. 6 of 1995
- Enacted by: Government of Tanzania
- Status: Current legislation

Tanzanian nationality law is regulated by the Constitution of Tanzania, as amended; the Tanzania Citizenship Act, and its revisions; and various international agreements to which the country is a signatory. These laws determine who is, or is eligible to be, a national of Tanzania. The legal means to acquire nationality, formal legal membership in a nation, differ from the domestic relationship of rights and obligations between a national and the nation, known as citizenship. Nationality describes the relationship of an individual to the state under international law, whereas citizenship is the domestic relationship of an individual within the nation. Commonwealth countries, including Tanzania, often use the terms nationality and citizenship as synonyms, despite recognising their legal distinction and the fact that they are regulated by different governmental administrative bodies. For much of Tanzania's history racist policy curtailed domestic rights and nationality. Tanzanian nationality is typically obtained under the principle of jus soli, i.e. by birth in the territory, or jus sanguinis, i.e. by birth in Tanzania or abroad to parents with Tanzanian nationality. It can be granted to persons with an affiliation to the country, or to a permanent resident who has lived in the country for a given period of time through naturalisation.

== Acquisition of nationality ==
Persons can acquire nationality in Tanzania by birth or later in life through naturalisation.

=== By birth ===
Any child born within the borders of the United Republic of Tanzania, on or after Union Day, 26 April 1964, is granted Tanzanian nationality, except for children of a father who has diplomatic immunity, or parents who were enemy aliens and the territory was under enemy occupation. In practice, for a child to acquire nationality at birth one of its parents must be Tanzanian, or the parents must be unknown, as in the case of an abandoned child. A person born outside Tanzania also has the right to Tanzanian nationality by birth provided that at least one of their parents is Tanzanian by birth or naturalization. However, Tanzanian fathers born abroad are not able to pass their nationality on to their children, meaning that if a child's father acquired nationality by birth abroad, his child can only acquire nationality through naturalisation. The same rule does not apply to children born abroad to Tanzanian mothers who have acquired nationality by birth abroad.

=== By naturalisation ===
Any foreign national with no ancestry or birth ties with Tanzania may apply for naturalisation. In order for a foreign national to become Tanzanian they must have resided in the territory for a sufficient period of time to confirm they understand either Swahili or the English language and the customs and traditions of the society. General provisions are that applicants must be of the age of majority and have legal capacity; have good character; have the ability to contribute to the growth of the social and cultural advancement of the country; and intend to permanently reside in the territory. Residency for the full year preceding an application is required, as well as evidence that over the preceding ten-year period, the applicant has cumulatively lived in Tanzania for at least seven years. Following the lodging of the application and paying fees to the Ward Executive Secretary or Zanzibari Sheha, local village administrators, the application is sent to the District Immigration Office. The applicant must publish a notice of intention to naturalise in two consecutive issues of the registered newspapers. After the application has been scrutinised by various officials, a final recommendation is made to the Minister of Home Affairs. If the application is successful, applicants must renounce foreign nationality and take an oath of allegiance. Besides foreigners meeting the criteria, other persons who may be naturalized include:

- Children born abroad to a father who acquired nationality by descent because of his birth abroad may naturalise without meeting other requirements;
- Minor children may be naturalised simultaneously with their parents;
- Adoptees may apply for naturalisation upon completion of a legal adoption;
- Any minor may be naturalised at the discretion of the Minister of Home Affairs if special circumstances exist;
- The wife of a Tanzanian husband may upon request become naturalised, if she is willing to renounce other nationality and take an oath of allegiance, unless she previously was denaturalised or renounced Tanzanian nationality; or
- Wives who previously lost Tanzanian nationality must obtain approval from the Minister of Home Affairs.

== Loss of nationality ==
Tanzanian nationals can voluntarily renounce it by registering a request, providing proof of other nationality, surrendering their Tanzanian passport, and obtaining approval from the Minister of Home Affairs. Nationals by birth or naturalisation may be denaturalized in Tanzania for obtaining other nationality. Those who acquired Tanzanian status by naturalisation may have their citizenship revoked for acting in a foreign country in a manner, such as voting or holding elected office, which is an exclusive right of a citizen; for fraud in a naturalisation application; for criminal convictions carrying a sentence of at least twelve months within five years of naturalisation; for disloyal behaviour or crimes against the state; or for five years residence abroad without registering with authorities their intention to retain Tanzanian nationality. Re-acquisition of nationality that has been lost through renunciation by a woman who married a foreigner, may be granted at the discretion of the Minister of Home Affairs.

== Dual nationality ==
Tanzania does not allow its nationals to hold dual nationality, except in the case of persons under the age of eighteen who had multiple nationality from birth. Multiple nationals automatically lose their Tanzanian citizenship at majority, unless they renounce all other nationality.

== Commonwealth citizenship ==
The State of Tanganyika became a member of the Commonwealth of Nations on 9 December 1961 and Zanzibar joined the Commonwealth on 10 December 1963. Since 26 April 1964, following the merger of the Tanganyika and Zanzibar, the United Republic of Tanganyika and Zanzibar (known as the United Republic of Tanzania since 29 October 1964) was a Commonwealth country. Being that it is a member of the Commonwealth of Nations, in the United Kingdom, Tanzanian citizens are also Commonwealth citizens, a status which entitles them to certain rights and benefits in that country. Amongst some of the benefits, in some countries without Tanzanian consular representation, citizens of the United Republic may enquire or seek assistance with the United Kingdom's High Commission. Tanzanians may not hold office, vote, or enter or work in other Commonwealth countries without visas or permits.

== East African Community citizenship ==
In 1967, Kenya, Tanzania, and Uganda signed the Treaty for East African Cooperation, creating the East African Community. It collapsed in 1977, but negotiations continued until 1984 on final dissolution because of an inability to reach agreement on the distribution of the organizations assets and liabilities. In November 1999, the three countries signed a new treaty to reestablish the organization effective on 7 July 2000. The community expanded to include Burundi, Rwanda and since 2016, has included South Sudan. The organization has a shared East African Legislative Assembly, East African Court of Justice and issues an East African Passport to assist in free movement of EAC citizens in member countries. National identity cards can also be used to verify that an individual is a national of a member country. It also has developed policies to assist local business in facilitating trade and attracting foreign investments, through a common market system launched in 2010. Under the terms of the common market treaty capital, goods, labour and services were to be allowed free movement within the member countries, meaning tariff barriers and obstacles to trade were removed; workers and their family members would not be subject to discriminatory labour laws or permits; and business, communication, distribution, education, financial, tourist, and transport services would operate freely among members.

== History ==
Humans began settling in the region some ten thousand years establishing small villages throughout the eastern part of the Rift Valley. The first known people were Khoisan-speakers, who were joined by Cushitic migrants from Ethiopia around 1000 BC, and later Bantu peoples who arrived in the western region around 1000 AD. These various groups had little interaction. By the tenth century, semi-nomadic Nilotic peoples had begun to settle in the north and northwestern region. Most of these Nilotic people settled in permanent villages and intermarried with Bantu people, but some groups, like the Maasai people retained their nomadic traditions. Through the eighteenth century, most settlements in the region were scattered and independently governed. Between 1000 and 1300 AD Persian and Arab merchants began settling along the Swahili coast and offshore islands, establishing villages and Afro-Arab trade networks. By the fifteenth century, these trade networks dominated the coastal area.

=== African and outsider contact (1498–1884) ===
In 1498, Portuguese navigator Vasco da Gama reached the African Great Lakes coast, and landed at Quelimane, before proceeding north to encounter hostile Arab sultanates, which were aligned with the Kilwa Sultanate. In 1500, Pedro Álvares Cabral landed on Kilwa Island and two years later, da Gama returned to the island and claimed it for Portugal. In 1503 or 1504, Ruy Lourenço Marques Ravasco (also known as Rui Lourenço Ravasco) landed on Unguja and engaged in a battle with the local inhabitants. Defeating the local ruler, Portugal laid claim to Zanzibar. In 1505, Francisco de Almeida seized the island and began construction of a trading fort at São Thiago. In 1652, Omani tribesmen from Muscat attacked the Portuguese settlements on Pemba Island and Zanzibar. They continued attacks along the coast to the Ruvuma River in the 1660s and by 1698 had captured Fort Jesus, on Mombasa Island. By the late eighteenth century the Omani Empire had established control over Kilwa and the coastal region.

Few foreign explorers or merchants attempted to travel into the interior until the eighteenth century. By 1800, Nyamwezi people had begun participating in trade with the coast. Between 1811 and 1820, the Sultan of Zanzibar sent caravans inland in search of ivory and slaves. By 1830, Arab-Swahili merchants had networks running from the coastal towns to trading posts in Tabora and as far west as Ujiji and from Lake Tanganyika in the south to the Kingdom of Buganda in the north. Increased activity from Europeans and Americans began in the early nineteenth century. Britain signed the Moresby Treaty with the Sultan of Zanzibar, outlawing the sale of slaves to Christian merchants. Further treaties were conclude in 1833 with the United States, 1844 with France, and 1858 with Germany to allow trade in the region. By the end of the nineteenth century, Germany and Britain were competing for control of the area.

=== Tanganyika ===
==== German rule (1884–1922) ====
In November 1884, Carl Peters was sent to the area by the Society for German Colonization and secured twelve treaties with local rulers granting Germany territorial rights to an area of around 2,500 square miles stretching from Usagara southward to the Nguru Mountains and then east to the Uzigua Forest in the current Pwani Region, before meeting the coast at Ukami, near Dar es Salaam. In February 1885, Kaiser William I issued a decree acknowledging the annexations and gave Peters a charter to colonize and govern the area. Dar es Salaam was ceded to the Germans on 19 August 1885, and Britain agreed to Germany's establishment of a protectorate over the area between the Ruvuma River and the Kenyan border. In 1886 an Anglo-German agreement divided the territories controlled by the Sultan of Zanzibar between Britain and Germany, leaving the Sultan in control of the Lamu Archipelago, Mafia and Pemba Islands, and Zanzibar as well as a strip of land on the mainland coast from Kipini to Tunghi Bay near Mikindani, extending inland ten miles. In 1888, Germany was granted a fifty-year lease over the coastal strip by the Sultan of Zanzibar, giving it virtual control of the mainland territory of modern Tanzania.

Under the terms of the German Colonial Act of 1888, German colonies were not part of the federal union, but they were also not considered foreign. Thus, laws that were extended to the colonies sometimes treated residents as nationals and other times as foreigners. German law applied to those subjects who had been born in Germany. Native subjects in the colonies were not considered to be German, but were allowed to naturalize. Naturalization required ten years residence in the territory and proof of self-employment. It was automatically bestowed upon all members of a family, meaning children and wives derived the nationality of the husband. In 1894 the German government established German East Africa, including parts of present day Burundi, Rwanda, and Tanzania as a formal colony under its protection. Under German rule, British Indians, who had first migrated as traders to the region in 1832 and later served as indentured workers to build the railway, were not considered to be British, and held a status akin to natives in German East Africa. The Nationality Law of 1913 changed the basis for acquiring German nationality from domicile to patrilineality, but did not alter derivative nationality. In 1914 during World War I, German and British forces skirmished in the northern border region of German East Africa. By the end of 1916, Belgian and British forces established a military occupation for the territory north of the Tanganyika Railway. By March 1918, the Germans had been driven south to Portuguese Mozambique and a British military administrator took over the management of German East Africa. Three years after the Treaty of Versailles was signed in 1919, Tanganyika Territory became a League of Nations mandated territory, under the authority of Britain.

==== British mandate/trust territory of Tanganyika (1922–1961) ====
Britain officially began its mandate over Tanganyika on 20 July 1922 acquiring extraterritorial jurisdiction over British subjects in the territory. Under British law, mandated territories were outside the Crown's dominions, meaning that British nationality laws did not apply to natives, but only to British subjects born to British fathers who may have been domiciled in a mandated place. (Note: A commission was convened in 1946 to review nationality of the inhabitants in former German colonies. It concluded that inhabitants of mandates did not acquire British nationality and if they had been German nationals under the terms of the 1913 Nationality law, they became stateless when Germany abandoned its territories. According to D. P. O'Connell, they were deemed to be "lacking nationality but enjoying an administrative status analogous to that of inhabitants of British protectorates".) As a protected territory, Britain took responsibility for both internal and external administration, including defense and foreign relations. Indigenous persons who were born in a mandate were treated as British Protected Persons and were not entitled to be British nationals. On 13 December 1946, the territory officially became a United Nations Trust Territory. By the 1949 British Order in Council, persons who were indigenous to Tanganyika were defined as Protected Persons, outside the nationality schemes for British subjects, and acquisition of protected status depended upon birth in the territory or abroad to father who was a native of Tanganyika.

=== Zanzibar Protectorate (1890–1963) ===
The British established a protectorate over the islands of Zanzibar and Pemba on 4 November 1890, acquiring extraterritorial jurisdiction over British subjects. To gain Germany's acceptance for the creation of the protectorate, Britain ceded Heligoland to Germany that year. British Nationality Acts did not extend beyond the bounds of the United Kingdom of Great Britain and Ireland, meaning that under Britain's rules of conquest, laws in place at the time of acquisition remained in place until changed. Because the Sultan of Zanzibar had an existing government, Zanzibar was treated as a Protected State under British laws, rather than a protectorate, for which Britain would have administered internal and external government functions.

==== Zanzibari subjects in the protectorate (1911–1963) ====
In 1911, the Sultan of Zanzibar passed the Nationality and Naturalsation Decree (No. 12), which defined Zanzibari subjects as persons born or naturalised in Zanzibar, persons born abroad to a Zanzibari father, and wives of Zanzibari husbands. In 1952, the 1911 Decree was repealed, but persons who had acquired Zanzibari nationality under its provisions were confirmed as continuing to be Zanzibari subjects. The new Nationality Decree (No. 30-52) provided that anyone born in Zanzibar was Zanzibari, unless they were subjects of Belgium, France, or Portugal, as well as anyone born anywhere to a Zanzibari father. For those born abroad, their children could not derive their nationality without being born in Zanzibar, meaning that only one generation could acquire nationality abroad by descent. Minor children and wives of any Zanzibari subject could be registered as nationals upon request and taking an oath of allegiance. Requirements for naturalisation included legal majority and capacity; a continuous residency in the dominions of the Sultan of three years or five years if not continuous; knowledge of Arabic, English, or Kiswahili; and evidence of good character. A minor amendment was made to these provisions by Decree No. 16 in 1958, which required continuous residence in the dominions of the Sultan for the year prior to application and cumulative residency of four years over the previous seven-year period.

==== Indian and other British protected persons living in the Zanzibar Protectorate (1914–1963) ====
When British protectorates were established in 1815, there was little difference between the rights of British subjects and protected persons. Other than common law, there was no standard statutory law which applied for subjects throughout the realm, meaning different jurisdictions created their own legislation for local conditions, which often conflicted with the laws in other jurisdictions in the empire. Thus, a person who was naturalised in Canada, for example, would be considered a foreigner, rather than a British national, in Australia or South Africa. Similarly, Indians born in the British Raj were considered to be British subjects with full rights throughout the realm, but Indians born in the Princely states or the territories Britain governed in East Africa were considered to be British Protected Persons (BPPs).

By 1914, British protectorates were considered to be foreign territories lacking an internal government. When Britain extended this status over a territory, it took responsibility for both internal and external administration, including defense and foreign relations. Indigenous persons who were born in a protectorate were known as British Protected Persons and were not entitled to be British nationals. BPPs had no right of return to the United Kingdom and were unable to exercise rights of citizenship; however, they could be issued a passport and could access diplomatic services when traveling abroad. In 1914, the Alien Restriction Act clarified that while BPPs were not nationals, neither were they aliens. When the law was amended in 1919, that provision remained the same, meaning that BPPs could not naturalise. Until 1934, when the British Protected Persons Order was drafted, the status of BPP was not statutory, but rather granted at the prerogative of the monarch. Under the 1934 Order, belonger status with regard to protected territories was defined to mean persons born before or after the Order in a protectorate who possessed no nationality and were not a British subject, or persons born abroad to a native of a protectorate who were stateless and not British subjects. The statute extended BPP status to children and wives of BPPs, if they were stateless, and specifically provided that if a woman married someone who was a national of another nation, she lost her BPP status.

In 1943, the British Nationality Act clarified that BPPs born abroad in territories that were within the Crown's dominions were British subjects by virtue of jus soli, but those born within a protectorate were not subjects. The terms of the British Nationality Act 1948, retained the provisions that BPPs were not aliens and could not naturalise, but allowed BPPs to register as BPP of a protected place or as a British subject under certain conditions. In 1949, the British Protectorates, Protected States and Protected Persons Order in Council repealed former orders about BPPs and detailed provisions for conferring protected status. It provided that protected persons were BPPs of a protectorate if they were born there; if they were born abroad to a father who was a native of a protectorate; or if at the time of their birth their father was a BPP. It also allowed women married to BPPs to register as a BPP and allowed certain nationals of foreign countries to register as BPPs. Under its terms, BPPs of the Zanzibar Protectorate were allowed to naturalise as British subjects. Minor changes to protected persons' status were made by Orders of Council in 1952, 1953, 1958, 1960, 1961, and 1962, but major changes did not occur until 1965.

==== British and British-Indian subjects living in the Tanganyika Territory and Zanzibar Protectorate (1890–1963) ====
In Britain, allegiance, in which subjects pledged to support a monarch, was the precursor to the modern concept of nationality. The crown recognized from 1350 that all persons born within the territories of the British Empire were subjects. Those born outside the realm — except children of those serving in an official post abroad, children of the monarch, and children born on a British ship — were considered by common law to be foreigners. Marriage did not affect the status of a subject of the realm, but under common law, single women, including divorcées, were not allowed to be parents thus their children could not derive nationality maternally and were stateless unless legitimated by their father. For British subjects, and their descendants, throughout the British Empire, in 1911, at the Imperial Conference a decision was made to draft a common nationality code.

The British Nationality and Status of Aliens Act 1914 allowed local jurisdictions in the British self-governing territories to continue regulating nationality in their jurisdictions, but also established an imperial nationality scheme for use in the realm. Under the terms of the Act, common law provisions were reiterated for natural-born persons born within the realm on or after the effective date. By using the word person, the statute nullified legitimacy requirements for jus soli nationals, meaning an illegitimate child could derive nationality from its mother. For those born abroad on or after the effective date, legitimacy was still required, and could only be derived by a child from a British father (one generation), who was natural-born or naturalized. It also provided that a married woman derived her nationality from her spouse, meaning if he was British, she was also, and if he was foreign, so was she. It stipulated that upon loss of nationality of a husband, a wife could declare that she wished to remain British. It allowed that if a marriage had terminated, through death or divorce, a British-born national who had lost her status through marriage could reacquire British nationality through naturalization without meeting a residency requirement. Naturalization required five years residence or service to the crown.

Amendments to the British Nationality Act were enacted in 1918, 1922, 1933 and 1943 changing derivative nationality by descent and modifying slightly provisions for women to lose their nationality upon marriage. Because of a rise in statelessness, a woman who did not automatically acquire her husband's nationality upon marriage or upon his naturalization in another country, did not lose her British status after 1933. The 1943 revision allowed a child born abroad at any time to be a British national by descent if the Secretary of State agreed to register the birth. Under the terms of the British Nationality Act 1948, British nationals in the Tanganyika Territory and Zanzibar Protectorate were reclassified at that time as "Citizens of the UK and Colonies" (CUKC). The basic British nationality scheme did not change overmuch, and typically those who were previously defined as British remained the same. Changes included that wives and children no longer automatically acquired the status of the husband or father, children who acquired nationality by descent no longer were required to make a retention declaration, and registrations for children born abroad were extended.

=== Pre-union (1961–1963) ===
On 9 December 1961, Tanganyika gained its independence. Under the Independence Constitution, Tanganyikan nationality was conferred on that date upon anyone who had previously been born in Tanganyika or any person who had previously been a CUKC or BPP of Tanganyika, if one of its parents had also been born in Tanganyika. Persons born outside of the territory were conferred nationality if their father became, or would have become except for his death, Tanganyikan by birth. Those who acquired Tanganyikan status ceased to be British; however provisions were made for persons, such as the large Indian population who might have been born in the territory but whose father was not or wives of persons who did not acquire Tanganyikan nationality, to retain their status as CUKCs or BPPs if they had been born, registered, or naturalised in a place which remained part of the British realm or a state protected by Britain. Those born after independence acquired nationality by birth in Tanganyika, as long as neither parent was an enemy alien or had diplomatic immunity or by birth abroad through a father who had been born in Tanganyika, as long as the father had not been a CUKC or BPP. For a two-year period after independence persons, or their guardians for minor children, who had been born in Tanganyika to foreigners prior to independence; wives of Tanganyikans whose husbands became Tanganyikan at independence or would have become nationals except for their death, wives whose husbands registered in the transitional period or divorcées of such a person; and persons who had previously been naturalised or registered as CUKCs in Tanganyika were allowed to register as nationals. (Note: A 2020 report on nationality prepared by Caroline Nalule and Anna Nambooze states that processing delays on the transitional applications resulted in registration of only 21,557, out of some 60,000 Asians who were eligible for registration, by the 1963 deadline.) After independence, wives could be naturalised upon marriage to a Tanganyikan, but naturalisation rules were to be provided in the nationality law. Dual nationality was permissible only to minors born with multiple nationalities. Upon reaching majority, one nationality was required to renounced.

On the one-year anniversary of independence Tanganyika became a republic within the Commonwealth and adopted verbatim the rules contained in the Independence Constitution as the Citizenship Act 1961. In 1962, Tanganyika amended its Citizenship Act (Law No. 69) to allow "persons of African descent from Angola, the Cape Verde Islands, the Comorian Islands, French Somaliland, Mozambique, Portuguese Guinea, the San Tome and Principe Islands, Spanish West Africa, and the Republic of South Africa" to acquire Tanganyikan nationality after a five-year residency if they were proficient in English or Swahili. It was also amended in 1963 (Law No. 19) to allow any woman married after independence to be registered as a national upon marriage to a Tanganyikan. On 10 December 1963, Zanzibar acquired independence and persons who had been BPPs in the protectorate ceased to hold that status. Anyone who had been a subject prior to independence was conferred Zanzibari nationality at independence, thus even CUKCs who had been born in Zanzibar were no longer British nationals. The only exceptions were persons (and their wives) who were born, registered, or naturalised in a place that remained within the British realm after independence. After independence, nationality was acquired by persons born in the Sultan's dominions to Zanzibari parents, as long as the father did not have diplomatic immunity or was classed as an enemy alien. Persons born outside the Sultan's territories could acquire nationality through a Zanzibari father. Wives of Zanzibari husbands and parents or guardians of minor children who were not Zanzibari could apply on behalf of the child for nationality through registration. Nationality provisions did not change from the 1958 Decree.

On 12 January 1964, the Zanzibar Revolution broke out and the sultan was deposed. The Afro-Shirazi Party took over the government, established a one-party state, and repealed the independence constitution. Under the Existing Laws Decree (No. 1-1964) the nationality statutes of 1911, as amended in 1958 became law again, meaning that certain Asian nationals who had become nationals at independence were deprived of their nationality and became stateless for approximately four months.

=== Post-union (1964–present) ===
On 26 April 1964, the United Republic of Tanganyika and Zanzibar was formed, which was renamed as the United Republic of Tanzania on 29 October 1964. Effective with the date of union, Tanganyika's Citizenship Act 1961 was modified (Tanganyika Extension and Amendment Decree, Law No. 5, 1964) to recognise nationals of the United Republic as those born prior to the union in either state as nationals of the new republic and those born after the union as nationals if they were born in any part of the territory. In 1980, refugees fleeing from violence in Burundi and Rwanda were granted the right to apply for Tanzanian nationality as a group. Typical application processes and fees were waved and upon completion of the process, former refugee camps transitioned to Tanzanian villages. The process of receiving documents and nationality certificates was slow and many former refugees had still not received them after decades. Burundi and Rwandan refugees migrated again in excellerated numbers from the mid-1990s, causing strain to Tanzania's ability to integrate the population and causing security concerns. In reaction, refugees were both expelled by the government and the army forceably removed refugees and closed the border with Rwanda in 1996. Though political developments in the country caused the constitution to be rewritten and amended, no changes were made to the nationality requirements or laws until 1995.

In 1995, the Citizenship Act 1961 was repealed though nationality gained under the former Act continues to be recognized. Under the terms of the Tanzania Citizenship Act 1995 anyone who was a national of Tanzania on or before 26 April 1964 and was born in either Tanganyika and Zanzibar, or was born abroad to parents who were nationals before the union, or had been previously naturalised or registered was conferred nationality. Those born after the union, acquire nationality by birth in the territory to parents who are Tanzanian, unless the father had diplomatic immunity or either parent was an enemy alien, or by descent through a parent who is a Tanzanian national. The Act eliminated nationality by registration, consolidating former categories with naturalisation. Persons wishing to naturalise must renounce other nationality, speak one of the languages of the country, be of good character and able to contribute to the country's development, and have lived in the country for a minimum of eight years. Wives of Tanzanians may naturalize after proving that they are legally married, that their husband is Tanzanian, hold a valid passport, and have immigrated. Neither widows nor divorcées are entitled to naturalise. Dual nationality is prohibited except for minor children who acquired multiple nationality from birth. At majority only one nationality is allowed.

In 1997, the army again was ordered to expel refugees residing outside of designated camps. In 1998, a Refugee Act was passed requiring refugees to live in designated areas. This policy was updated as the National Refugee Policy in 2003 with plans to extend nationality to certain refugees. In June 2003, the Tanzanian government offered Somali refugees who had fled the civil war in their country the opportunity to acquire Tanzanian nationality. It extended a similar offer in 2007 to Burundi nationals and their descendants who had left their homeland since 1972. In 2011, a Constitutional Review Commission was formed which carried out public consultations before preparing a Draft Constitution in 2013. The draft proposals would recognise nationality based on birth to a Tanzanian and would replace the naturalisation scheme by reintroducing registration. Under its provisions either spouse would be able to register as Tanzanian by marriage and would be unaffected by a termination of the marriage if registered. It would make provisions for foundlings who are under age seven to acquire nationality and does not address dual nationality or deprivation of nationality, but does contain a provision that laws concerning acquisition will be made by the national parliament. A referendum to adopt the proposed draft in 2015 was postponed and the process has stalled. In September 2013, the refugee program was suspended while the naturalisation processes were incomplete. Approximately 35,000 refugees were forcibly expelled, before the policy resumed processing naturalisation petitions for Burundi refugees in 2014.

== See also ==
- Tanzanian passport
- Visa requirements for Tanzanian citizens
