= List of diplomatic missions of Tanzania =

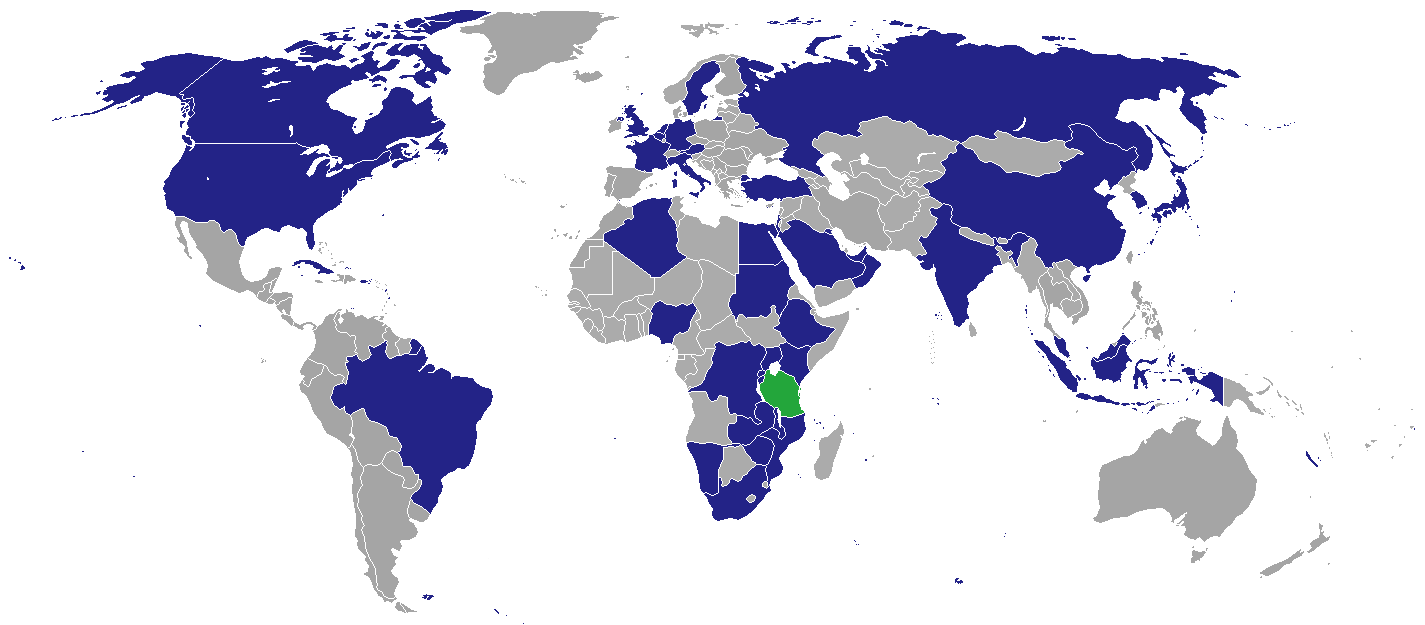
Location of diplomatic missions of Tanzania: Tanzania Embassy or High Commission

This is a list of diplomatic missions of Tanzania, excluding honorary consulates.

== Current missions ==
=== Africa ===
Host country	Host city	Mission	Concurrent accreditation	Ref.
Algeria	Algiers	Embassy		
Burundi	Bujumbura	Embassy		
Comoros	Moroni	Embassy		
Congo-Kinshasa	Kinshasa	Embassy	Countries: Cameroon; Central African Republic; Congo-Brazzaville; Gabon	
Congo-Kinshasa	Lubumbashi	Consulate-General	Countries: Cameroon; Central African Republic; Congo-Brazzaville; Gabon	
Egypt	Cairo	Embassy	Countries: Iraq; Jordan; Lebanon; Libya; Palestine; Syria	
Ethiopia	Addis Ababa	Embassy	Countries: Djibouti; Yemen; International Organizations: African Union; United Nations Economic Commission for Africa	
Kenya	Nairobi	High Commission	Countries: Eritrea; Seychelles; Somalia; South Sudan; International Organizations: United Nations; United Nations Environment Programme; United Nations Human Settlements Programme	
Kenya	Mombasa	Consulate-General	Countries: Eritrea; Seychelles; Somalia; South Sudan; International Organizations: United Nations; United Nations Environment Programme; United Nations Human Settlements Programme	
Malawi	Lilongwe	High Commission		
Mozambique	Maputo	High Commission	Countries: Eswatini; Madagascar	
Namibia	Windhoek	High Commission		
Nigeria	Abuja	High Commission	Countries: Benin; Burkina Faso; Gambia; Ghana; Guinea; Guinea-Bissau; Ivory Coast; Liberia; Mali; Mauritania; Niger; Senegal; Sierra Leone; Togo; International Organizations: Economic Community of West African States	
Rwanda	Kigali	High Commission		
South Africa	Pretoria	High Commission	Countries: Botswana; Lesotho; International Organizations: Southern African Development Community	
Sudan	Khartoum	Embassy		
Uganda	Kampala	High Commission		
Zambia	Lusaka	High Commission	Countries: Angola; São Tomé and Príncipe	
Zimbabwe	Harare	Embassy	Countries: Mauritius	

=== Americas ===
Host country	Host city	Mission	Concurrent accreditation	Ref.
Brazil	Brasília	Embassy	Countries: Argentina; Barbados; Chile; Colombia; Guyana; Jamaica; Peru; Trinidad and Tobago; Venezuela	
Canada	Ottawa	High Commission	International Organizations: International Civil Aviation Organization	
Cuba	Havana	Embassy		
United States	Washington, D.C.	Embassy	Countries: Mexico	

=== Asia ===
Host country	Host city	Mission	Concurrent accreditation	Ref.
China	Beijing	Embassy	Countries: Mongolia; North Korea; Vietnam	
China	Guangzhou	Consulate-General	Countries: Mongolia; North Korea; Vietnam	
India	New Delhi	High Commission	Countries: Bangladesh; Nepal; Sri Lanka	
Indonesia	Jakarta	Embassy	Countries: Australia; New Zealand; Singapore	
Israel	Tel Aviv	Embassy	Countries: Cyprus	
Japan	Tokyo	Embassy	Countries: Papua New Guinea	
Kuwait	Kuwait City	Embassy		
Malaysia	Kuala Lumpur	High Commission	Countries: Brunei; Cambodia; Laos; Philippines; Thailand	
Oman	Muscat	Embassy		
Qatar	Doha	Embassy		
Saudi Arabia	Riyadh	Embassy		
Saudi Arabia	Jeddah	Consulate-General		
South Korea	Seoul	Embassy		
Turkey	Ankara	Embassy	Countries: Azerbaijan	
United Arab Emirates	Abu Dhabi	Embassy	Countries: Bahrain; Iran; Pakistan	
United Arab Emirates	Dubai	Consulate-General	Countries: Bahrain; Iran; Pakistan	

=== Europe ===
Host country	Host city	Mission	Concurrent accreditation	Ref.
Austria	Vienna	Embassy	International Organizations: United Nations	
Belgium	Brussels	Embassy	Countries: Luxembourg; International Organizations: European Union; Organisation of African, Caribbean and Pacific States	
France	Paris	Embassy	Countries: Morocco; Portugal; Spain; Tunisia; International Organizations: OECD; UNESCO; World Tourism Organization	
Germany	Berlin	Embassy	Countries: Bulgaria; Czechia; Holy See; Hungary; Poland; Romania; Slovakia; Switzerland	
Italy	Rome	Embassy	Countries: Albania; Bosnia and Herzegovina; Croatia; Greece; Malta; Montenegro; North Macedonia; Serbia; Slovenia; International Organizations: Food and Agriculture Organization; International Fund for Agricultural Development; World Food Programme	
Netherlands	The Hague	Embassy	International Organizations: Organisation for the Prohibition of Chemical Weapons	
Russia	Moscow	Embassy	Countries: Armenia; Belarus; Kazakhstan; Kyrgyzstan; Moldova; Tajikistan; Turkmenistan; Uzbekistan	
Sweden	Stockholm	Embassy	Countries: Denmark; Estonia; Finland; Latvia; Lithuania; Norway; Ukraine	
United Kingdom	London	High Commission	Countries: Ireland	

=== Multilateral organizations ===
Organization	Host city	Host country	Mission	Concurrent accreditation	Ref.
United Nations	New York City	United States	Permanent Mission		
United Nations	Geneva	Switzerland	Permanent Mission		

== Gallery ==
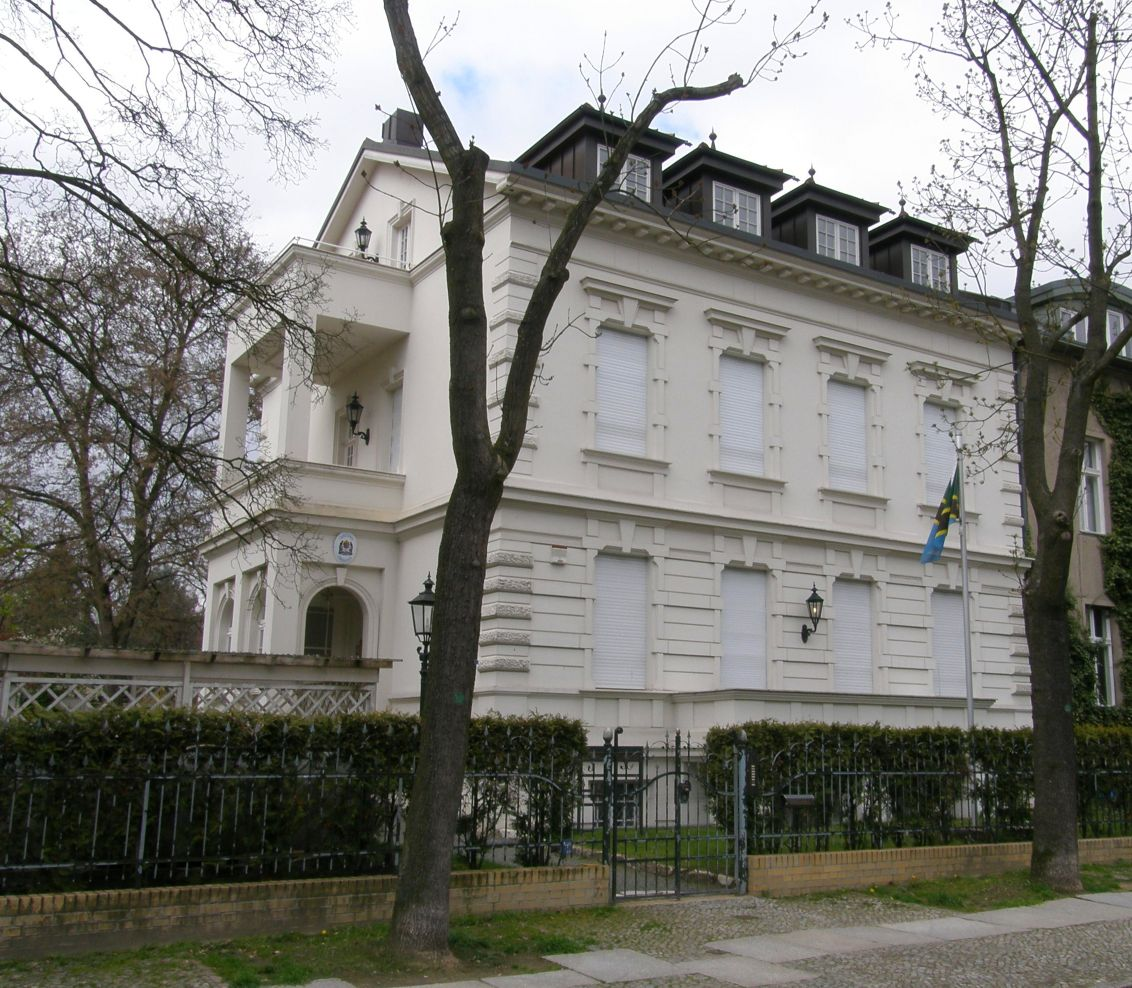
Embassy in Berlin

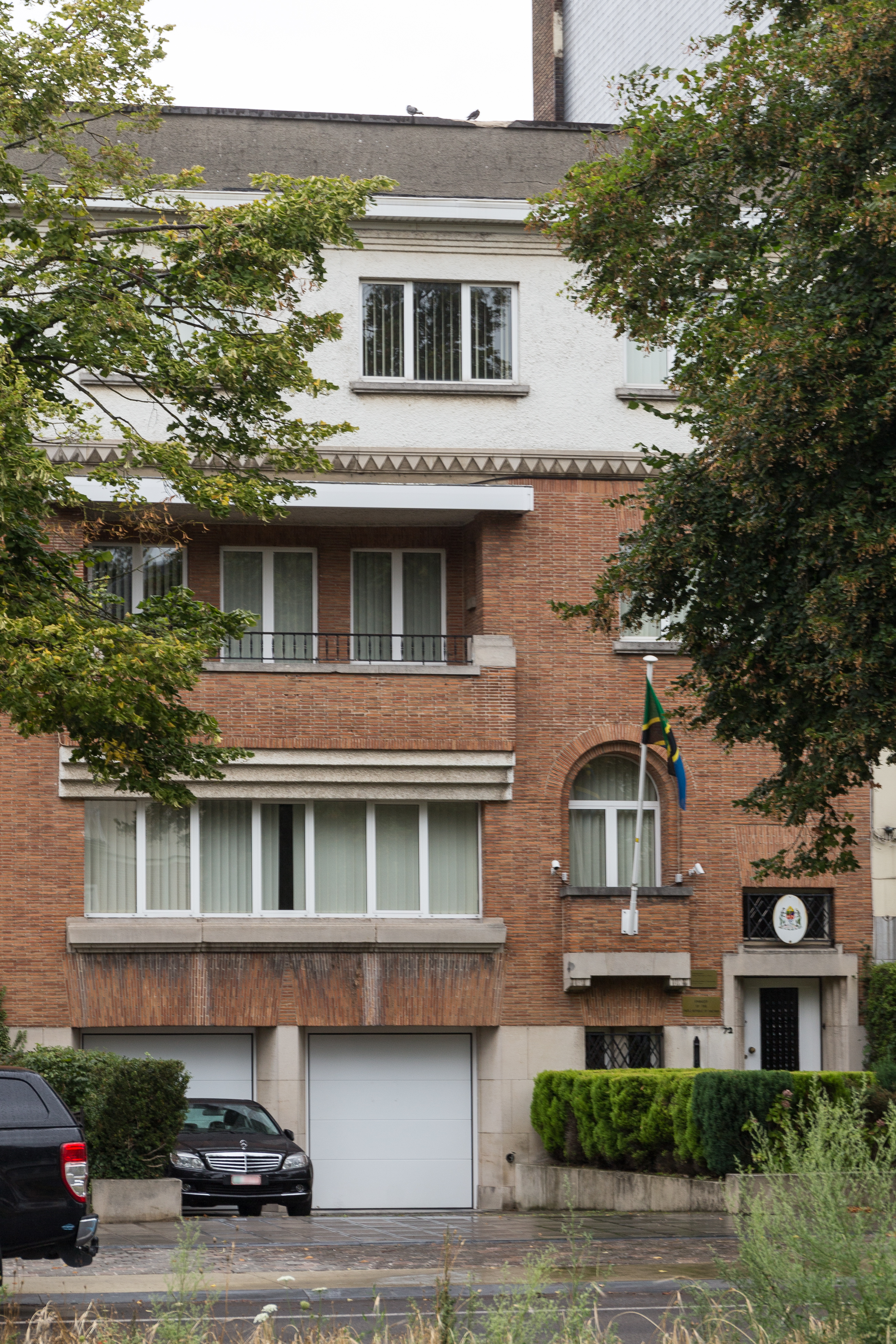
Embassy in Brussels

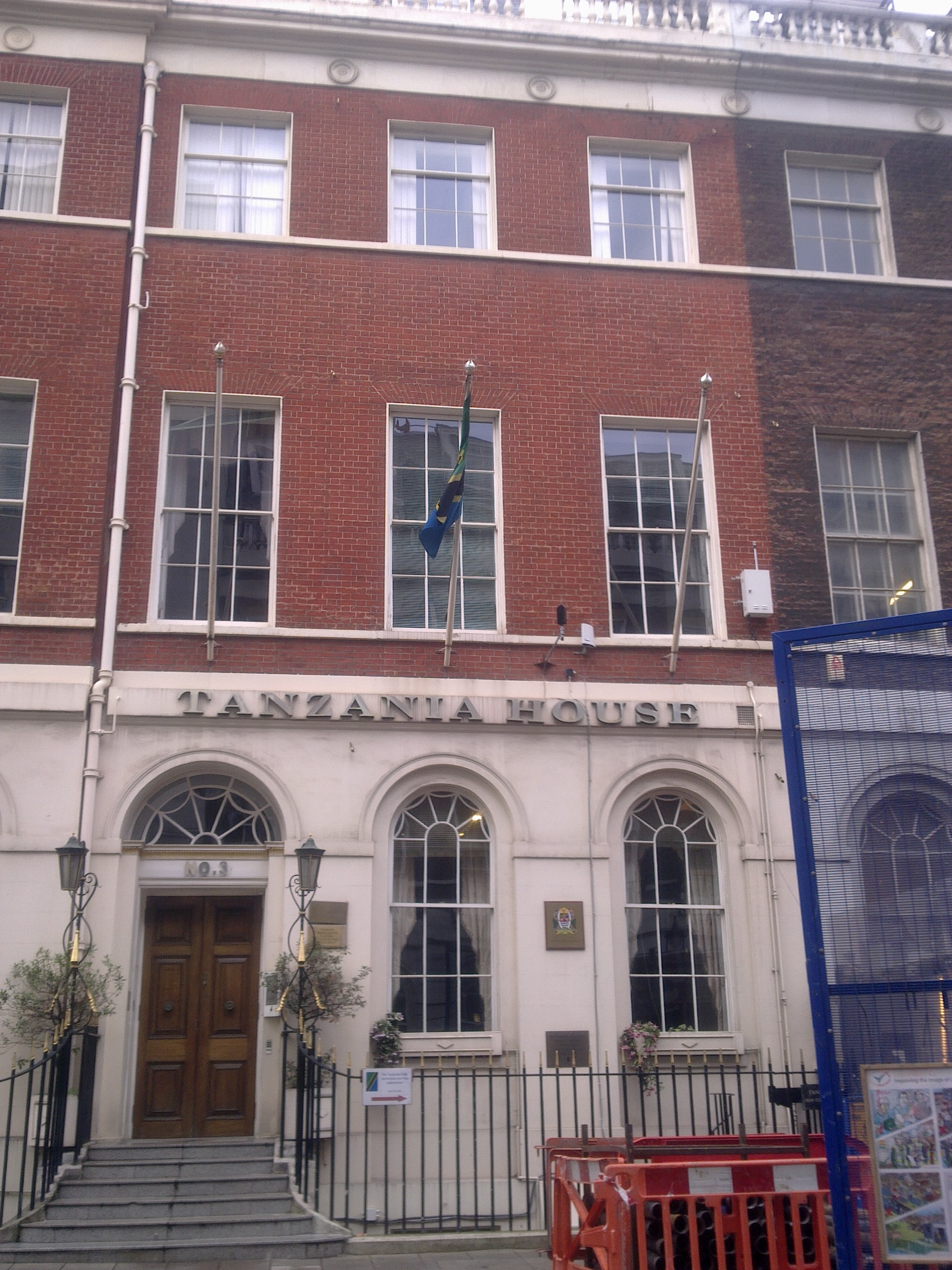
High Commission in London

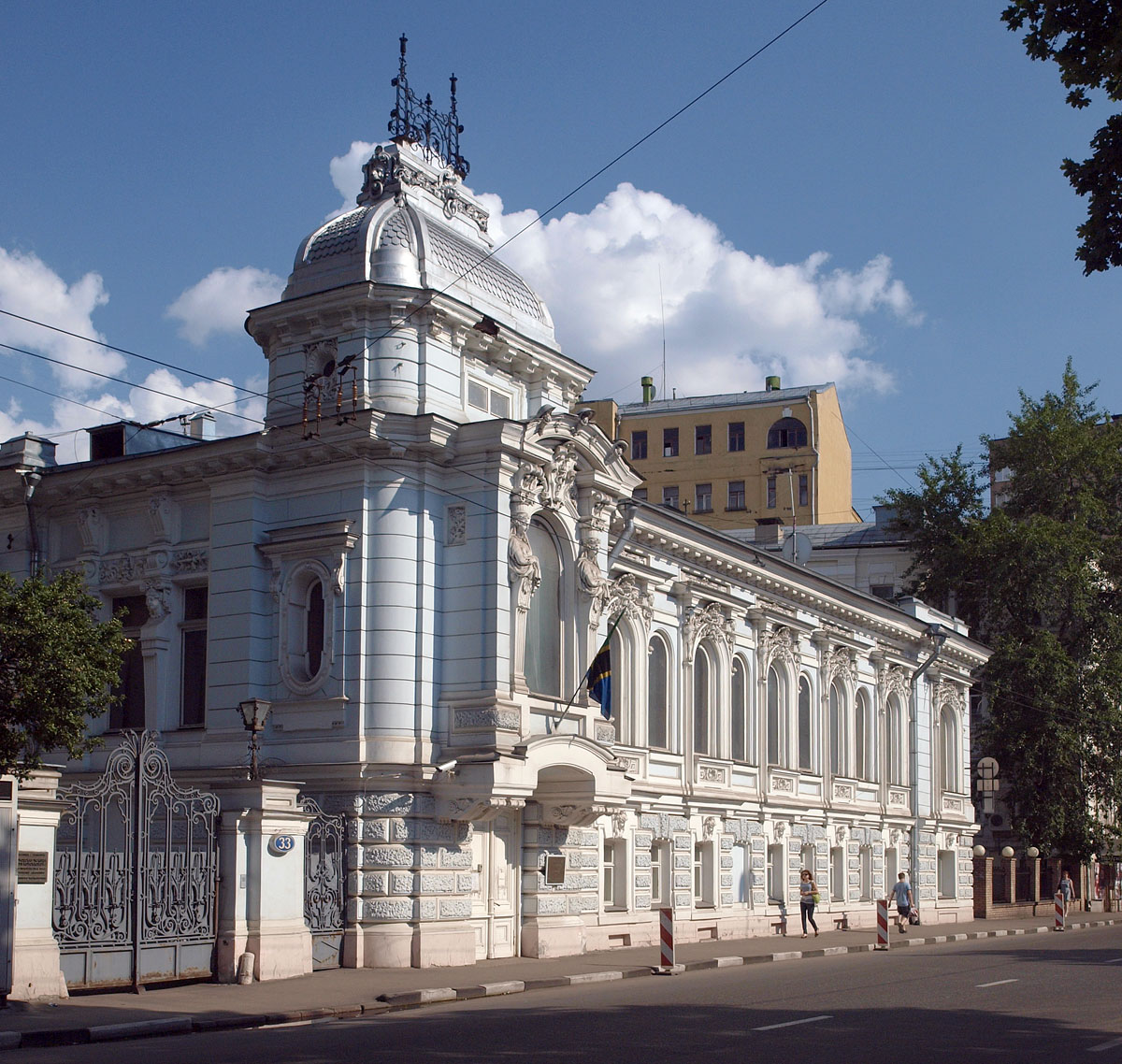
Embassy in Moscow

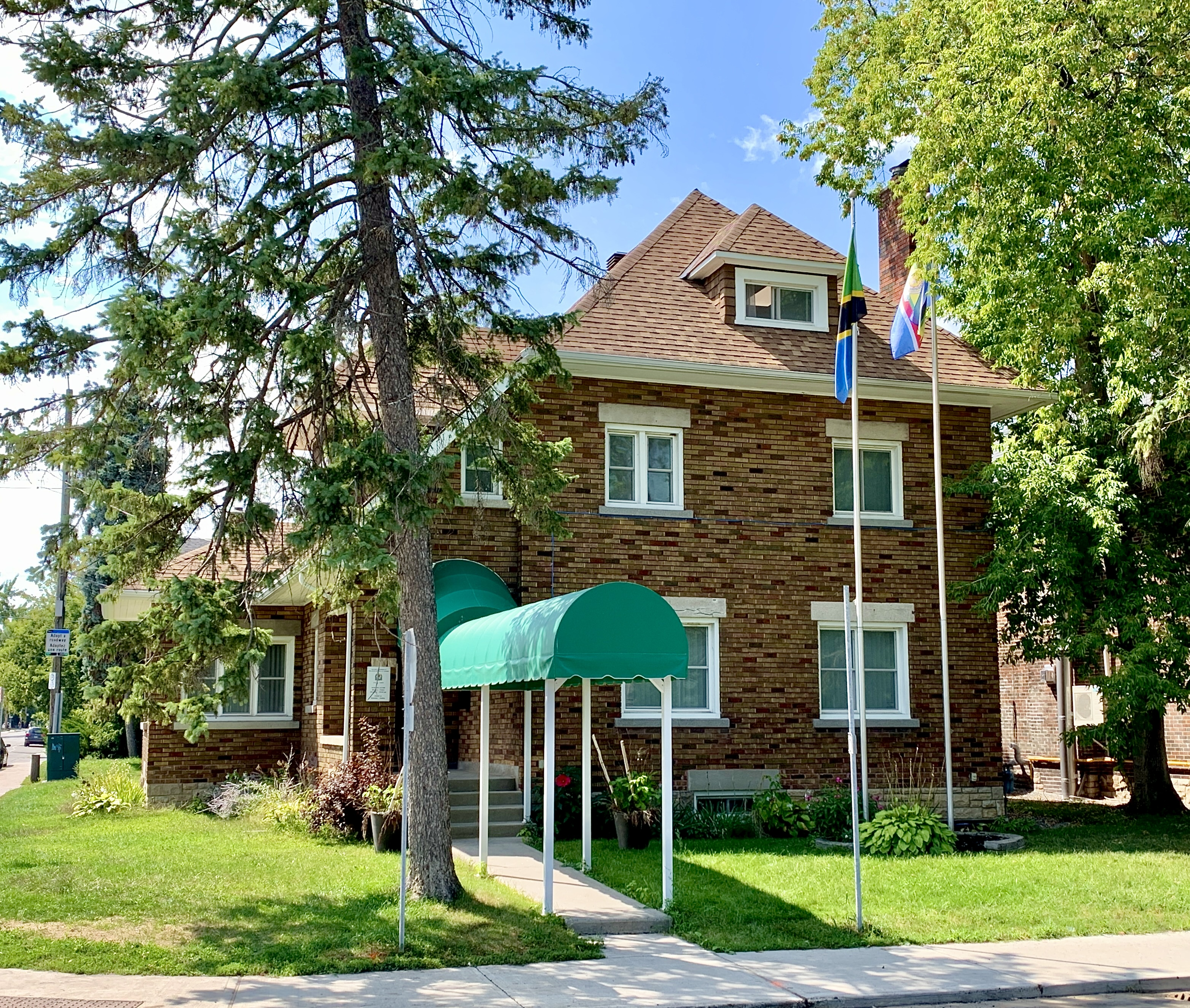
High Commission in Ottawa

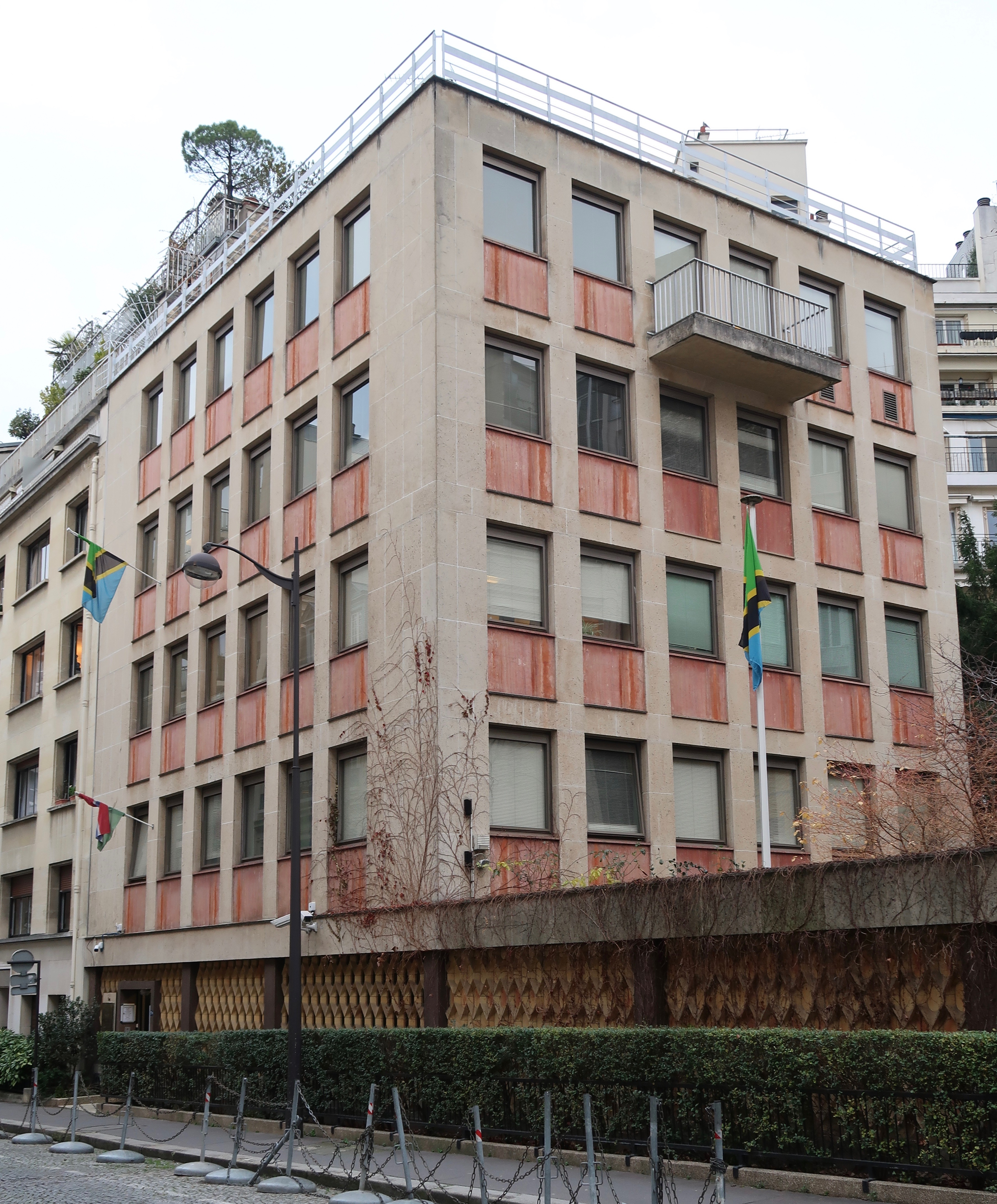
Embassy in Paris

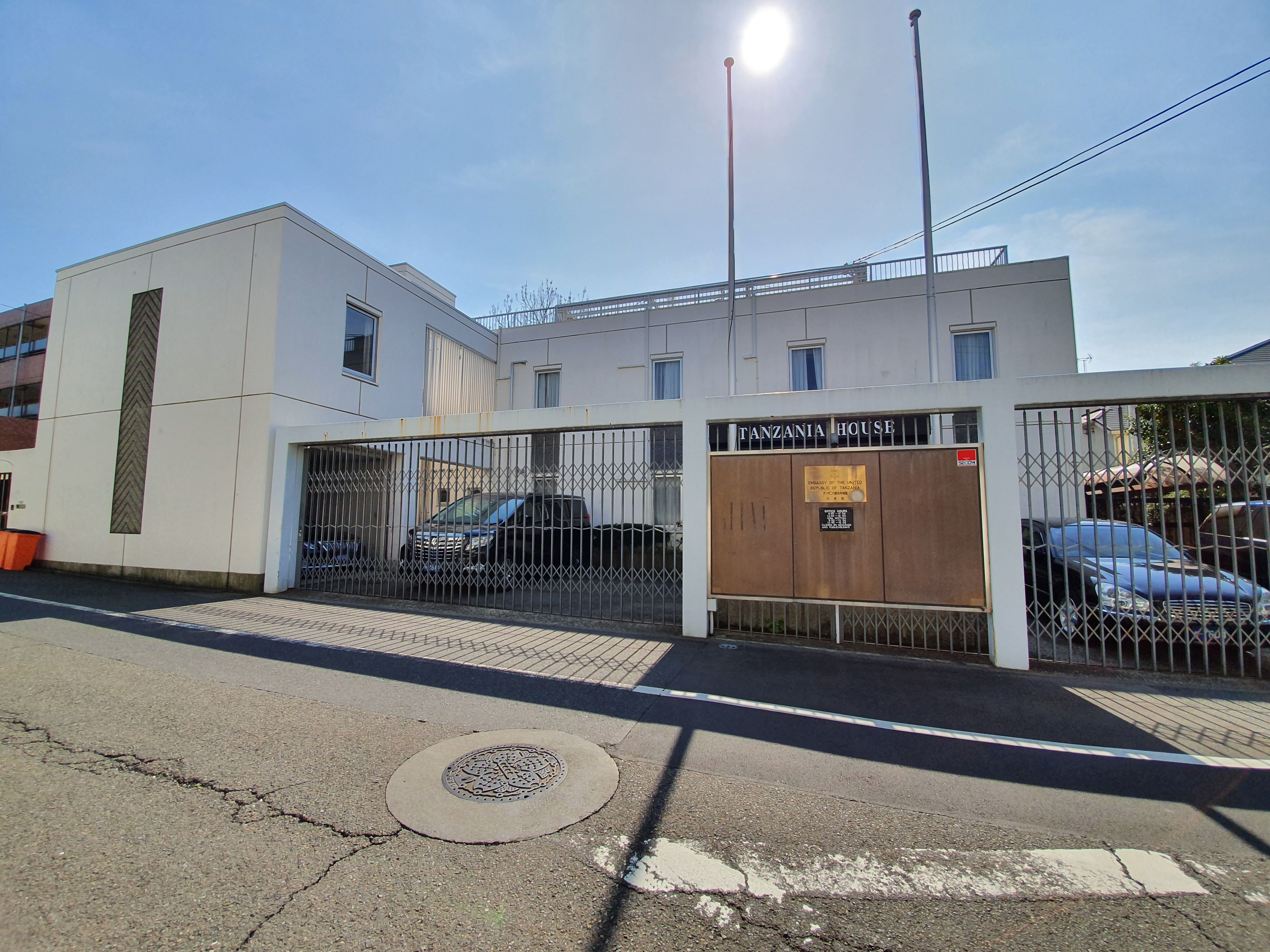
Embassy in Tokyo

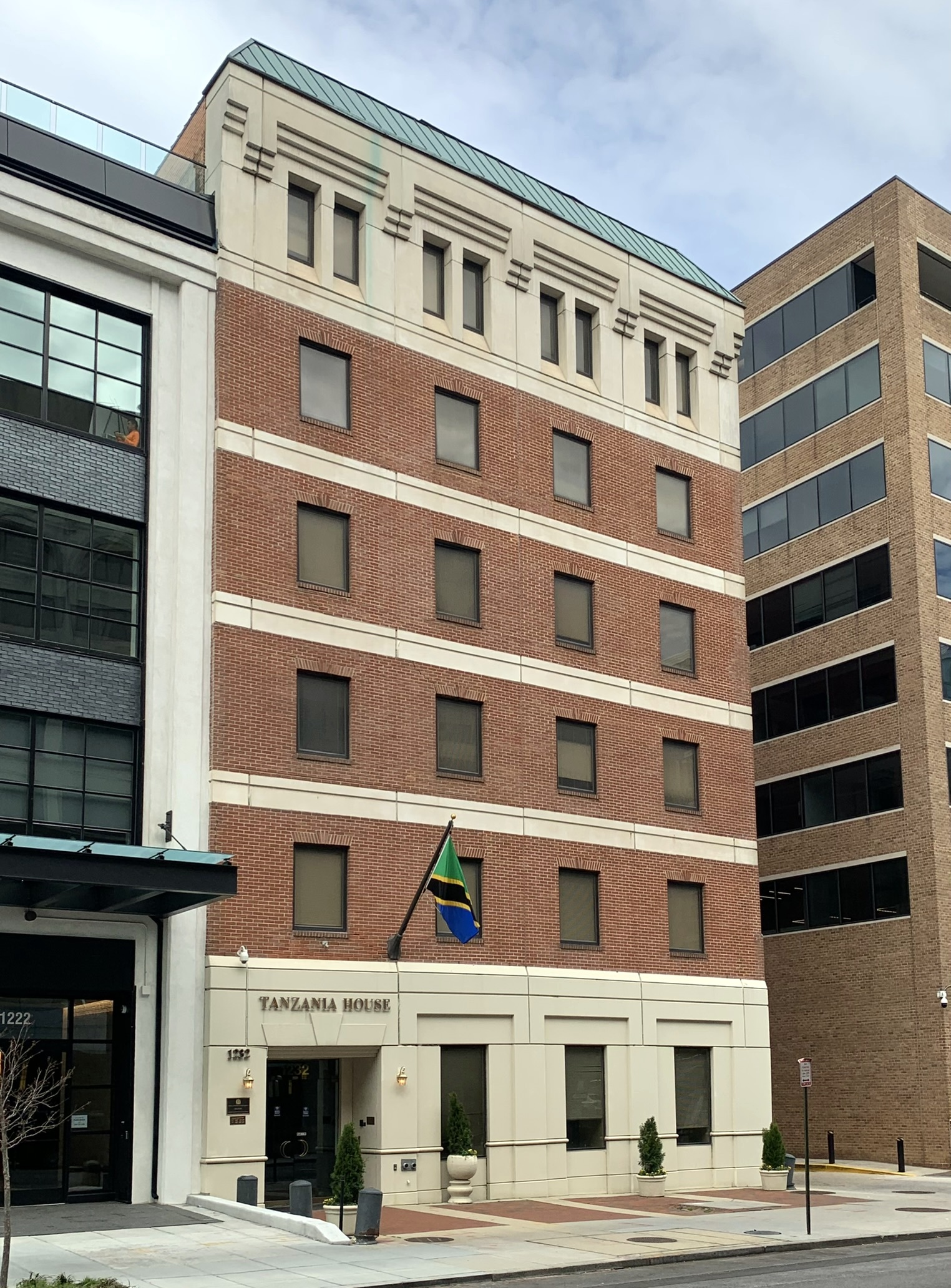
Embassy in Washington, D.C.

== Future missions ==
- Vietnam
  - Hanoi (Embassy)
- India
  - Mumbai (Consulate-General)

== Closed missions ==
=== Africa ===
Host country	Host city	Mission	Year closed	Ref.
Angola	Luanda	Embassy (Note: Resident in Lusaka, Zambia)	Unknown	
Libya	Tripoli	Embassy (Note: Resident in Cairo, Egypt)	Unknown	

== See also ==
- Foreign relations of Tanzania
- List of diplomatic missions in Tanzania
- List of heads of missions of Tanzania
- Visa policy of Tanzania
