= Visa policy of Tanzania =

Policy on permits required to enter Tanzania

Visitors to Tanzania must obtain either a visa on arrival or an e-Visa unless they are citizens of one of the visa-exempt countries or citizens who must obtain a visa from one of the Tanzanian diplomatic missions.

Sample of Tanzanian visa

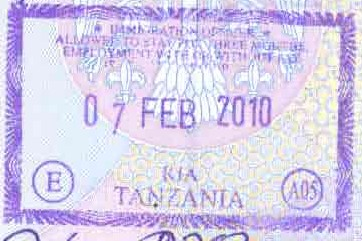
Entry stamp

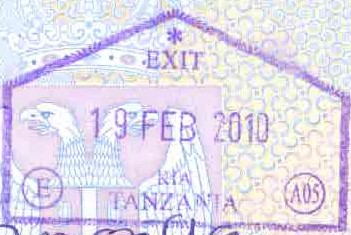
Exit stamp

== Visa policy map ==
Visa policy of Tanzania Tanzania Visa not required (90 days) Visa on arrival / eVisa Visa required

== Visa exemption ==
=== Ordinary passports ===
Holders of ordinary passports of the following countries and territories may enter Tanzania without a visa for up to 90 days:

- Angola
- Antigua and Barbuda
- Bahamas
- Barbados
- Belize
- Botswana
- Brunei
- Burundi
- Cyprus
- Dominica
- Democratic Republic of Congo
- Eswatini
- Gambia
- Ghana
- Grenada
- Guyana
- Hong Kong
- Jamaica
- Kenya
- Kiribati
- Lesotho
- Macau
- Madagascar
- Malawi
- Malaysia
- Malta
- Mauritius
- Mozambique
- Namibia
- Nauru
- Papua New Guinea
- Romania
- Rwanda
- Saint Kitts and Nevis
- Saint Lucia
- Saint Vincent
- Samoa
- Seychelles
- Singapore
- Solomon Islands
- South Africa
- South Sudan
- Tonga
- Trinidad and Tobago
- Tuvalu
- Uganda
- Vanuatu
- Zambia
- Zimbabwe

In addition, visa exemption applies to holders of passports issued to residents of the following territories:

Holders of the following British passports:

British Overseas Territories Citizens:

- Anguilla
- Bermuda
- British Virgin Islands
- Cayman Islands
- Falkland Islands
- Gibraltar
- Montserrat
- Saint Helena, Ascension and Tristan da Cunha
- Turks and Caicos Islands

British Citizens:

- Isle of Man
- Guernsey
- Jersey

Holders of the following New Zealand passports:

- Cook Islands residents
- Niue residents
- Tokelau residents

Holders of the following Australian passports:

- Ashmore and Cartier Islands residents
- Christmas Island residents
- Cocos (Keeling) Islands residents
- Heard Island and McDonald Islands residents
- Norfolk Island residents

Date of visa changes
- 28 March 1972: Romania
- 25 August 2023: Democratic Republic of Congo
- 8 April 2025: Angola

=== Non-ordinary passports ===
Holders of diplomatic or service/official/special passports issued to citizens of Brazil, China, India, South Korea and Turkey may enter Tanzania without a visa.

== Visa on arrival ==
Citizens of other countries may obtain a visa on arrival. Visa must be paid with notes of USD 50 or USD 100. The length of stay is determined at ports of entry.

== Electronic visa (e-Visa) ==
Tanzania introduced an e-Visa system on 26 November 2018. It is obligatory to have a visa to enter Tanzania unless you are from one of a few countries which are visa exempt. When travelling to the country this normally presents you with two options. You can either enter with a prearranged Tanzanian eVisa or get a visa on arrival.

== Visa required in advance ==
Citizens of the following countries and territories must obtain a visa in advance, as they require approval of the Commissioner General of Immigration or the Commissioner of Immigration:

- Afghanistan
- Bangladesh
- Burkina Faso
- Chad
- Guinea
- Guinea Bissau
- Eritrea
- Iran
- Iraq
- Kyrgyzstan
- Lebanon
- Mali
- Mauritania
- Niger
- Pakistan
- Palestine
- Sierra Leone
- Somalia
- Syria
- Tajikistan
- Turkmenistan
- Uzbekistan
- Yemen

The same regulation applies to stateless persons and persons with refugee status.

== Mandatory vaccination ==
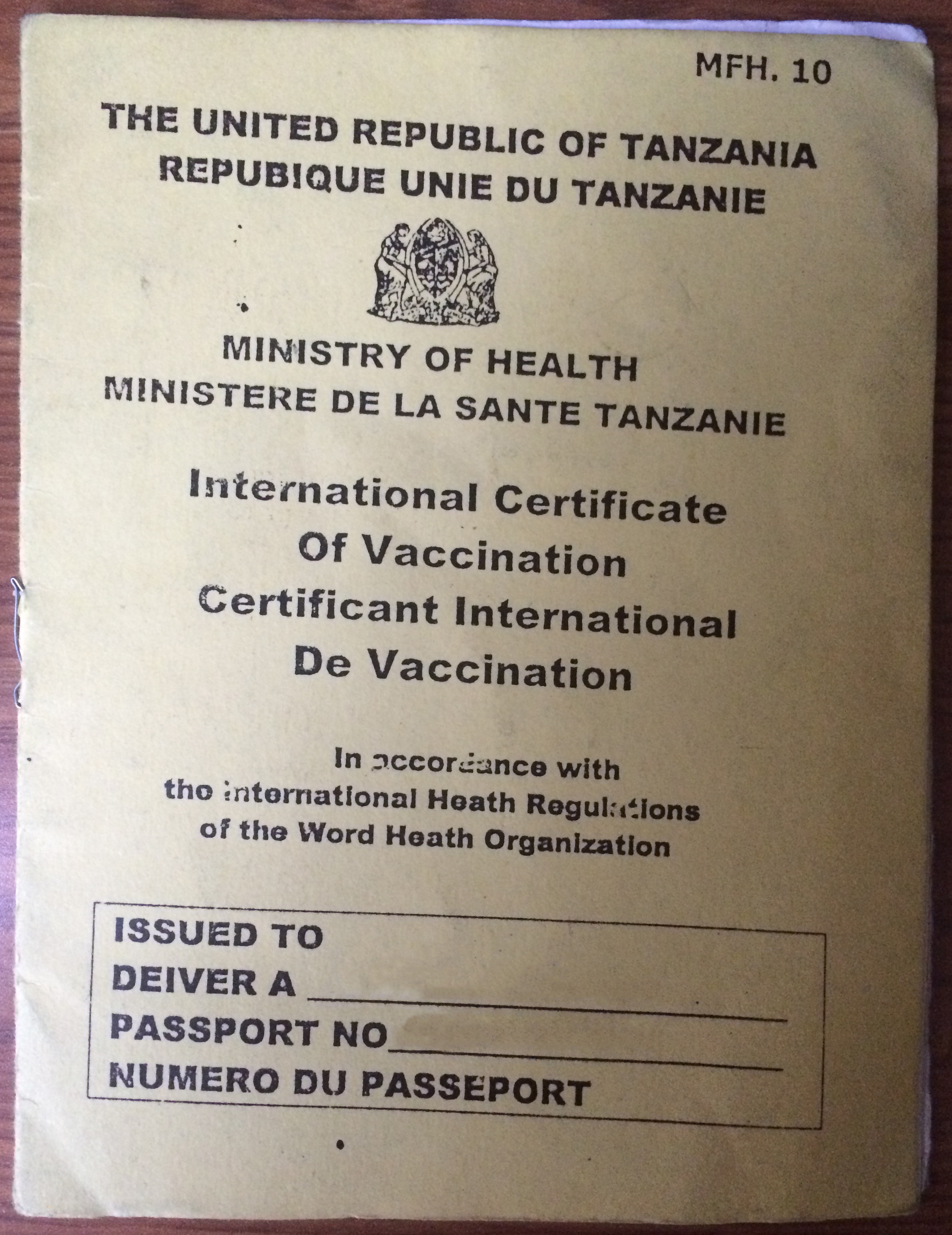
Yellow Fever vaccination certificate issued by Tanzania

Proof of Yellow fever vaccination is required for all travellers travelling through or from the following countries: Angola, Argentina, Benin, Bolivia, Brazil, Burkina Faso, Burundi, Cameroon, Central African Republic, Chad, Colombia, Republic of the Congo, Democratic Republic of the Congo, Côte d'Ivoire, Ecuador, Equatorial Guinea, Ethiopia, French Guiana, Gabon, Gambia, Ghana, Guinea, Guinea-Bissau, Guyana, Kenya, Liberia, Mali, Mauritania, Niger, Nigeria, Panama, Paraguay, Peru, Rwanda, Senegal, Sierra Leone, South Sudan, Sudan, Suriname, Togo, Trinidad and Tobago, Uganda, Venezuela, Zambia. The Tanzanian ministry of health mandates a transit time of more than 12 hours or a disembarkment from the immediate airport area from the above mentioned countries during transit as a possible health threat and requires travelers in such situations to possess Yellow Fever Certificates.

== Mandatory insurance ==
Since 1 October 2024, all visitors to Zanzibar must have mandatory travel insurance from Zanzibar Insurance Corporation.

== Visitor statistics ==
Tourist Admissions into Tanzania by country in calendar year 2024

Most visitors arriving in Tanzania were from the following countries of nationality:

Country/Territory	2024	2022	2021	2019	2018	2017	2016	2015	2014	2013
Kenya	233,115	166,324	89,842	128,287	126,479	230,922	233,730	197,562	188,214	193,078
Burundi	201,080	100,851	75,507	32,070	37,643	66,357	63,530	48,210	51,553	34,873
United States	143,378	100,600	48,537	218,394	234,890	82,283	86,860	66,394	80,489	69,671
France	110,431	100,371	51,647	94,688	54,205	34,505	24,611	28,683	33,585	33,335
Italy	106,177	45,282	7,013	99,270	58,722	51,758	50,715	53,742	49,518	57,372
Germany	102,798	67,718	25,081	82,470	81,308	58,394	57,643	52,236	47,262	53,951
United Kingdom	88,345	60,116	18,276	122,178	114,433	61,048	67,742	54,599	70,379	59,279
DRC	70,174	32,159	29,031	n/a	n/a	n/a	n/a	n/a	n/a	n/a
China	69,651	13,974	9,351	36,654	45,171	29,197	34,472	25,444	21,246	17,001
Zambia	66,491	46,787	28,076	35,126	34,631	22,561	28,836	32,694	36,679	64,825
India	63,391	36,925	28,431	21,687	31,921	38,487	69,876	32,608	27,327	27,334
Rwanda	62,977	44,288	34,929	7,025	8,733	50,431	47,056	45,216	50,038	46,637
Uganda	60,170	38,435	23,855	30,545	48,182	37,160	37,870	37,253	36,420	39,488
Poland	55,196	46,431	38,860	n/a	n/a	n/a	n/a	n/a	n/a	n/a
South Africa	53,737	39,755	29,690	58,035	67,757	47,777	43,468	30,288	26,614	31,144
Mozambique	42,977	22,188	n/a	n/a	n/a	n/a	n/a	n/a	n/a	n/a
Netherlands	42,007	27,810	9,634	83,998	42,160	26,542	24,197	20,150	23,710	20,633
Zimbabwe	39,641	28,897	16,791	31,308	33,878	26,543	22,148	30,533	36,497	30,765
Malawi	37,492	44,438	41,906	3,818	4,668	29,197	19,246	15,807	18,242	18,197
Spain	31,635	25,434	13,150	70,253	36,137	14,599	15,411	11,940	9,121	13,149
Australia	14,641	6,527	1,825	29,017	28,458	15,926	15,411	15,807	15,962	17,336
Russia	12,314	8,174	77,422	n/a	n/a	n/a	n/a	n/a	n/a	n/a
Israel	9,586	17,292	6,303	9,163	6,173	37,160	22,967	14,754	7,403	5,344
Ukraine	6,701	12,890	20,736	n/a	n/a	n/a	n/a	n/a	n/a	n/a
Total	2,141,895	1,454,920	922,692	1,527,230	1,505,702	1,327,143	1,284,279	1,137,182	1,140,156	1,095,885

== See also ==
- Visa requirements for Tanzanian citizens
