= List of heads of missions of Tanzania =

This is a list of current Heads of Tanzania Missions abroad.

== Resident heads of mission ==
Host city	Host country	Mission type	Head of mission
Africa
Algeria	Algiers	Embassy	Imani Salum Njalikai
Burundi	Bujumbura	Embassy	Gelasium Gaspar Byakanwa
Comoros	Moroni	Embassy	Said Othman Yakubu
Democratic Republic of the Congo	Kinshasa	Embassy	Said Juma Mshana
Democratic Republic of the Congo	Lubumbashi	Consulate-General	–
Egypt	Cairo	Embassy	Richard Mutayoba Makanzo
Ethiopia	Addis Ababa	Embassy	Innocent E. Shiyo
Kenya	Nairobi	High Commission	Dr. Benard Yohana Kibesse
Kenya	Mombasa	Consulate-General	–
Malawi	Lilongwe	High Commission	Agnes Kayola
Mozambique	Maputo	High Commission	Phaustine Martin Kasike
Namibia	Windhoek	High Commission	Caesar Chacha Waitara
Nigeria	Abuja	High Commission	Benson Alfred Bana
Rwanda	Kigali	Embassy	Ramson Godwin Mwaisaka
South Africa	Pretoria	High Commission	Gaudence Milanzi
Sudan	Khartoum	Embassy	Silima Haji Kombo
Uganda	Kampala	High Commission	John Stephen Simbachawene
Zambia	Lusaka	High Commission	Mathew Edward Mkingule
Zimbabwe	Harare	Embassy	Simon Nyakoro Sirro
Asia
China	Beijing	Embassy	Khamis Mussa Omar
China	Guangzhou	Consulate-General	Khatibu Makenga
India	New Delhi	High Commission	Anisa K. Mbega
Indonesia	Jakarta	Embassy	Macocha Moshe Tembele
Israel	Tel Aviv	Embassy	Alex Gabriel Kalua
Japan	Tokyo	Embassy	Baraka H. Luvanda
Kuwait	Kuwait City	Embassy	vacant
Malaysia	Kuala Lumpur	High Commission	Mahadhi Juma Maalim
Oman	Muscat	Embassy	Fatma Rajab
Qatar	Doha	Embassy	Habibu Awesi Mohamed
Saudi Arabia	Riyadh	Embassy	Mohamed Juma Abdallah
Saudi Arabia	Jeddah	Consulate-General	–
South Korea	Seoul	Embassy	Togolani Edriss Mavura
Turkey	Ankara	Embassy	Iddi Seif Bakari
United Arab Emirates	Abu Dhabi	Embassy	Lt. Gen. Yacoub Mohamed
United Arab Emirates	Dubai	Consulate-General	–
Americas
Brazil	Brasília	Embassy	Adelardus Kilangi
Canada	Ottawa	High Commission	Joseph Edward Sokoine
Cuba	Havana	Embassy	Humphrey Polepole
United States	Washington, D. C.	Embassy	Elsie Sia Kanza
Europe
Austria	Vienna	Embassy	Naimi Hamza Aziz –
Belgium	Brussels	Embassy	Jestas Abouk Nyamanga
France	Paris	Embassy	Ali Jabir Mwadini
Italy	Rome	Embassy	Mahmoud Thabit Kombo
Germany	Berlin	Embassy	Hassan Iddi Mwamweta
Netherlands	The Hague	Embassy	Caroline Kitana Chipeta
Russia	Moscow	Embassy	Fredrick Ibrahim Kibuta
Sweden	Stockholm	Embassy	Grace Alfred Olotu
Switzerland	Bern	Embassy	Abdallah Saleh Possi
United Kingdom	London	High Commission	Mbelwa Brighton Kariuki
Multilateral organizations
United Nations	New York City	Permanent Mission	Dr Suleiman H suleiman
UN Office at Geneva	Geneva	Permanent Mission	Hoyce Anderson Temu

== See also ==
- List of diplomatic missions of Tanzania
- Ministry of Foreign Affairs and International Co-operation (Tanzania)
