= Tanzanian passport =

Passport of the United Republic of Tanzania issued to Tanzanian citizens

Tanzanian Ordinary e-Passport
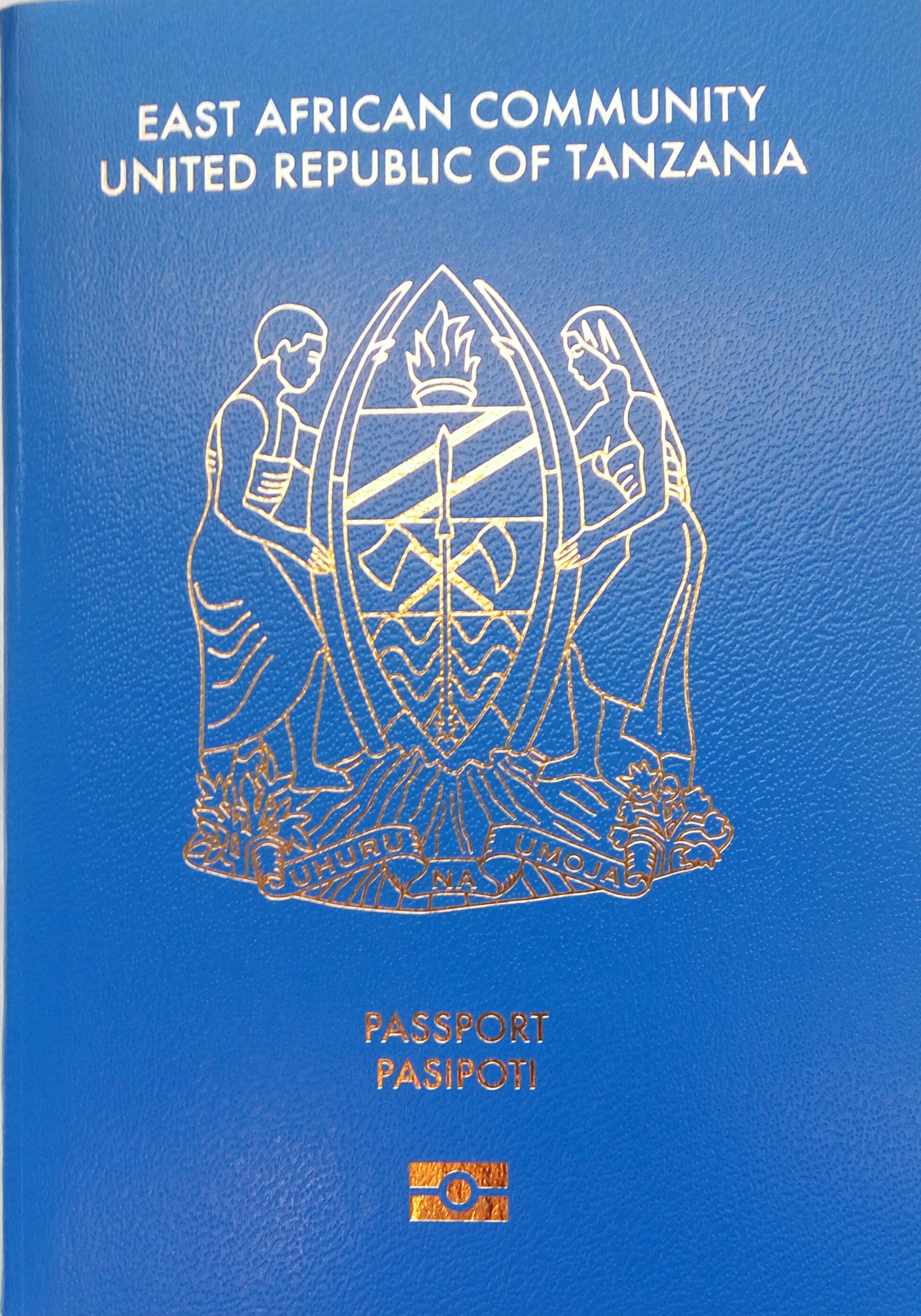
- Type: Passport
- Issued by: Tanzania
- First issued: December 2020 (biometric passport)
- Purpose: Identification
- Eligibility: Tanzanian citizenship
- Expiration: 10 years from date of issuance.

The Tanzanian passport is issued to citizens of the United Republic of Tanzania for international travel. The Immigration Department is responsible for the issuance of Passports for the purpose of international travel.

The Immigration Department falls under the Tanzanian Ministry of Home Affairs (In Kiswahili: Wizara ya Mambo ya Ndani ya Nchi). This passport is issued only to the citizens of Tanzania. There are three types of Passports, which are Ordinary, Service and Diplomatic.

As of January 2018, Tanzania began issuing the new East African format ePassport, in line with the East African Community integration plans.

Features of the Tanzanian ePassport;;

- –Electronic chip holding the same information as the old model passport
- –Enhanced Security features.
- –Biometric identifier
- –Digital photograph of the passport holder

The new ePassport is issued under different colours for Ordinary (navy blue), Diplomatic (red) and Service (green). The new ePassport has been made available to all Tanzanians seeking passports for international travel from January 2018.

The old ordinary passport was in use until January 2020 when it was officially retired.

== History ==
Before issuing the new ePassports, the Passport Control Authority of Tanzania used to issue machine-readable passports. The previous model before the machine readable version, was designed in the 1970s, before computer technology became widely available, hence the holder's data was typewritten or even handwritten on it.

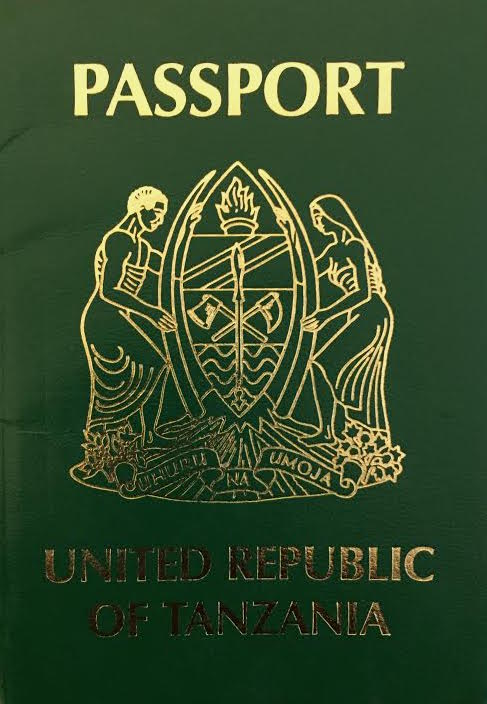
The front cover of the old machine readable Tanzanian Passport

In contrast to the current ePassports, the previous ordinary Tanzanian passport was green in colour, while the Diplomatic Passport was Black and Service Passport was blue. The new Tanzanian ePassport complies with the ICAO standards. When the passport was first issued, the holder's fingerprints, signature and photograph would be digitally acquired and stored in a database, but only the holder's digital picture was coded in the physical passport, in a two-dimensional barcode. The latter, as well as the holder's personal identification data and his or her picture are directly laser-printed on the passport.

== Validity ==
The Tanzanian passport is usually valid for a period of ten years from the date of issuance. Once expired it must be renewed in order to continue travelling. However, it can be renewed a few months before expiring so as not to inconvenience frequent travellers.

== Languages ==
Details inside the passport are provided in Swahili (the national language) and English, which are the two de facto official languages. There are captions in the data page that are translated in these two languages as well.

== Description ==
The new ePassports are navy blue colour for ordinary citizens. They have the Tanzanian coat of arms emblazoned in gold in the centre of the front cover. The coat of arms reads, "Uhuru na Umoja", which means "Freedom and Unity". The words "East African Community" are inscribed at the top followed by "The United Republic of Tanzania" inscribed in gold text above the coat of arms, while the words "Passport" is inscribed in gold text the coat of arms and "Pasipoti" inscribed in gold text at the bottom.

The first page of the passport includes the passport note followed by the identity information page. The pages inside the passport feature various designs including the 'big five game' animals found in Tanzanian national parks and the unification of Tanzania and Zanzibar by former President Julius K. Nyerere.

The Data Page Includes:

1. Type
2. State code
3. Passport number
4. Surname
5. Name
6. Nationality
7. Date of birth
8. Sex
9. Issue date
10. Expiry date
11. Place of birth
12. Issuing authority
13. Electronically printed signature

== Visa requirements ==
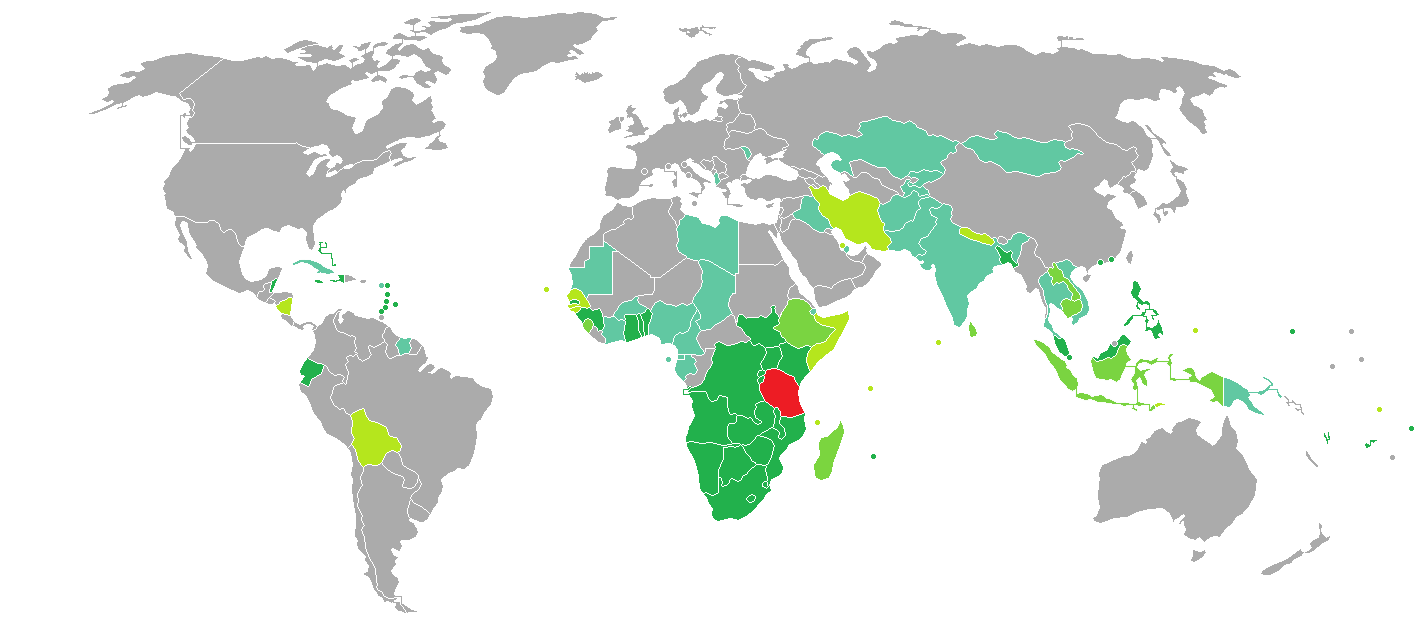
Tanzania Visa free access Visa on arrival eVisa Visa required

As of 30 April November 2026, Tanzanian citizens had visa-free or visa on arrival access to 68 countries and territories, ranking the Tanzanian passport 67th (tied with The Gambian Passport) in terms of travel freedom according to the Henley visa restrictions index.

== See also ==
- Tanzanian nationality law
- Visa requirements for Tanzanian citizens
