= High Commission of Tanzania, London =

Coordinates: 51°30′53″N 0°08′57″W

High Commission of Tanzania in London
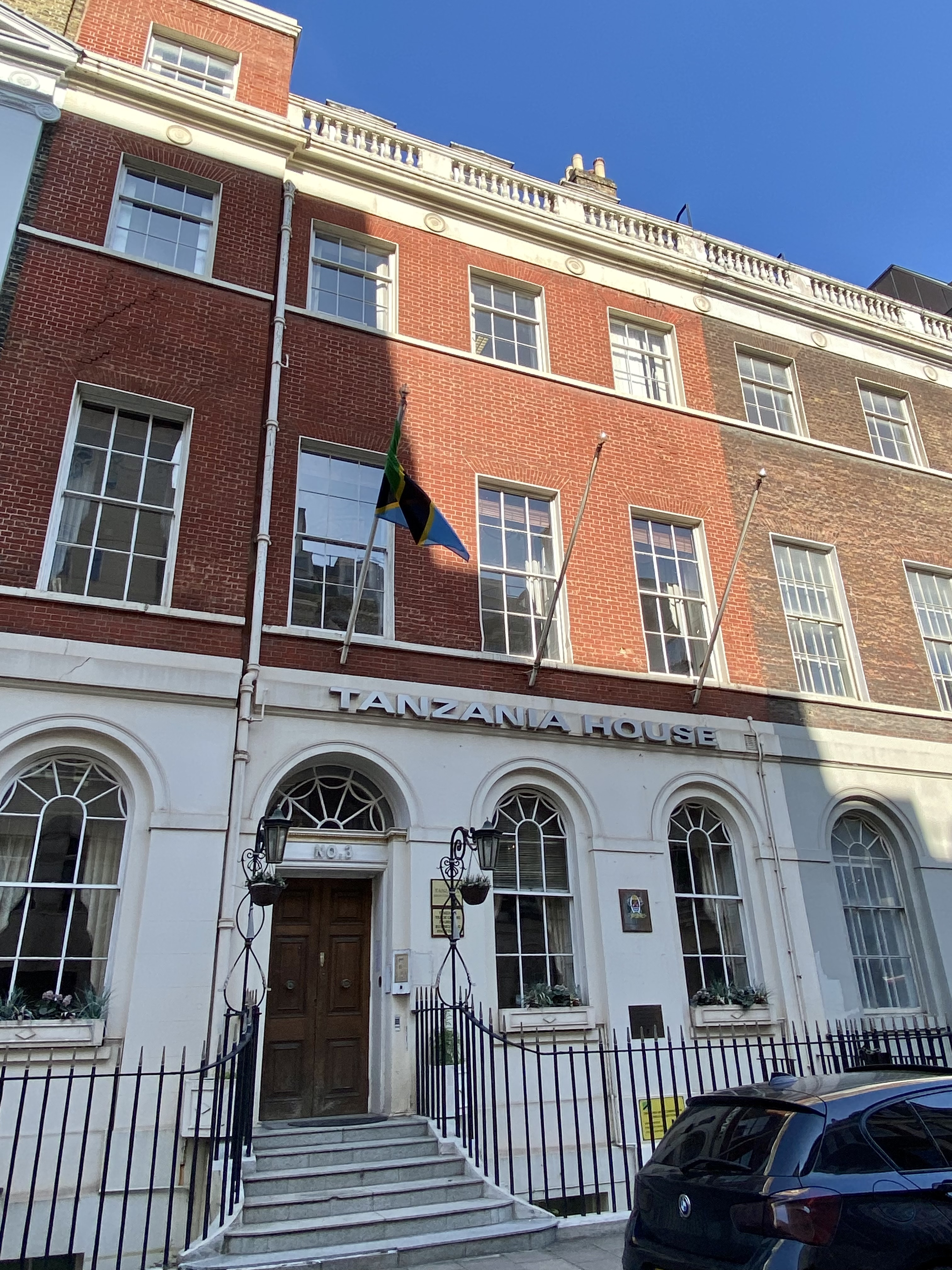
- Location: Marylebone, London
- Address: 3 View Road, London, N6 4DJ (Temporary)
- High Commissioner: Mbelwa Kairuki

The High Commission of the United Republic of Tanzania in London is the diplomatic mission of Tanzania in the United Kingdom. It is located in Stratford Place, a small cul-de-sac just off Oxford Street which it shares with the High Commission of Botswana, although due to renovations, is located at 3 View Road, London, as of August 2026. It was the former residence of Alice Liddell, the inspiration for the heroine of the children's book Alice's Adventures in Wonderland.

== See also ==
- List of diplomatic missions of Tanzania
