= Indians in Tanzania =

Ethnic diaspora

Watanzania wenye asili ya Kihindi (Swahili)

Total population
- c. 60,000 (2015) ^{[a]}

Regions with significant populations
- Dar es Salaam, Zanzibar

Languages
- Kutchi-Swahili, Odia, English (lingua franca), Kiswahili, Gujarati, Kutchi, Hindi

Religion
- Islam, Hinduism, Zoroastrianism, Sikhism; significant minorities Christianity

Related ethnic groups
- PIO, NRI and Desi
- a. includes about 10,000 expatriates

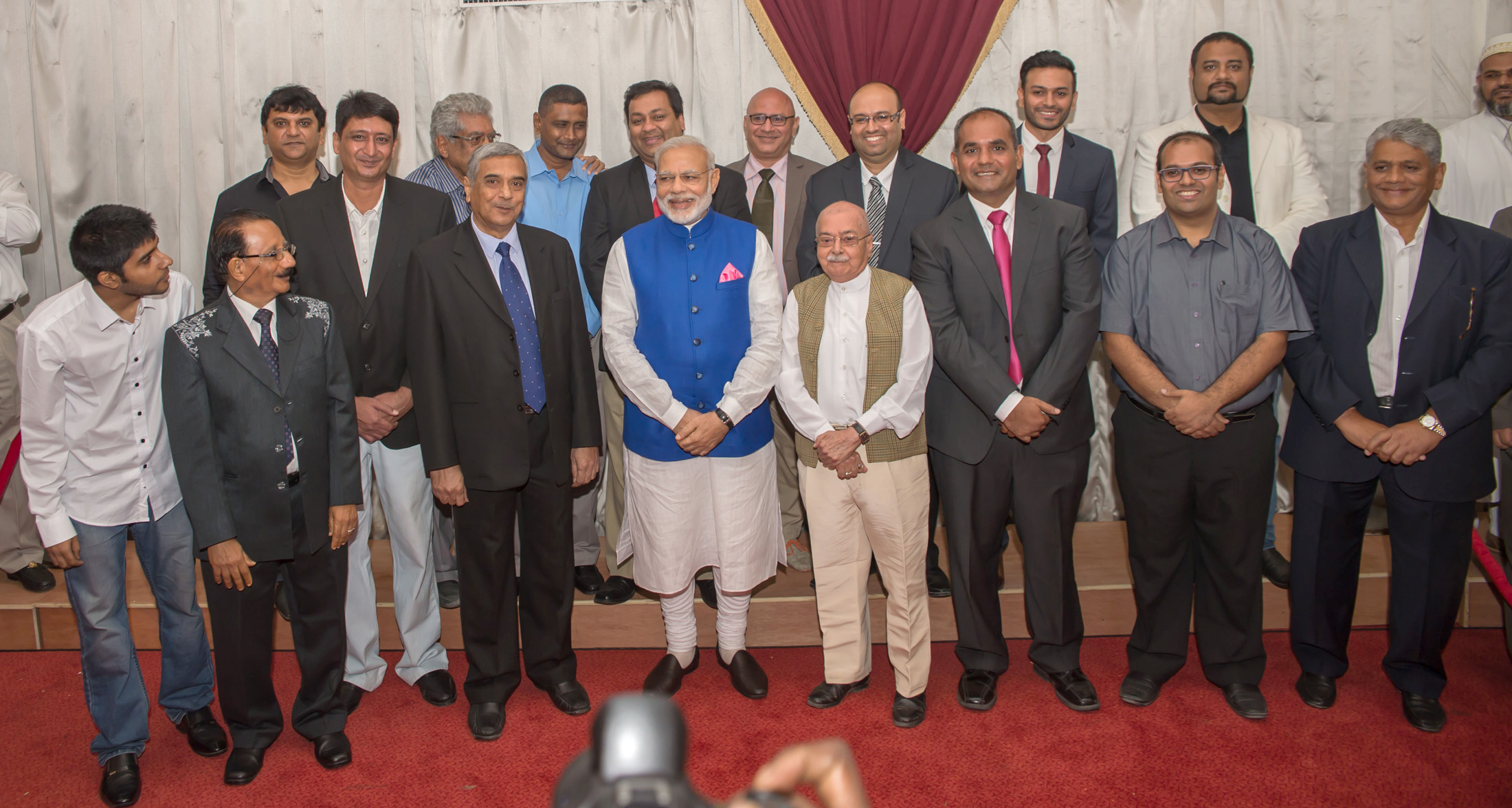
Indian Prime Minister Narendra Modi meets members of Indian community in Dar es Salaam, 10 July 2016

Indian Tanzanians constitute a significant demographic minority within Tanzania; more than 60,000 Tanzanian citizens of Indian descent reside in the country. Many among them are wealthy traders and entrepreneurs. Despite making up only 0.2% of the population, they are considered by the Hindu Council of Tanzania to have disproportionate ownership of Tanzanian companies. Indians have a long history in Tanzania, starting with the seasonal arrival of Gujarati traders who used the trade winds. They gradually settled there and came to control the trade in Zanzibar. Several buildings from that period still stand in Stone Town, the primary trading center on the island.

== History ==
Indian merchant and artisan community settlements are attested in both archaeological and literary sources. During the 13th and 14th centuries, Indian craftsmen utilized tube drawing technology to produce glass beads in Zanzibar. Trade between Malindi and Bengal is also attested during the Early Middle Ages. When Vasco da Gama landed on the East African Coast, he had encountered Indians residing in Kilwa Kisiwani, Mombasa and Mozambique.

== Notable people ==
- Richa Adhia, Miss Tanzania 2007
- Andy Chande, businessman and philanthropist
- Mohammed Dewji, CEO of MeTL, Member of Parliament (2005–2015)
- Benjamin Fernandes, Tanzanian entrepreneur
- Ammaar Ghadiyali, 2012 Olympic swimmer
- Mustafa Hassanali, fashion designer
- Amir H. Jamal, former Minister of Finance
- Ismail Jussa, opposition politician
- Abdulkarim Yusufali Alibai Karimjee, Speaker of the National Assembly
- Raheem Kassam, conservative British political activist. His parents were Tanzanian immigrants of Indian origin.
- Al Noor Kassum, former Energy Minister
- Mustafa Jaffer Sabodo, economist and philanthropist
- Freddie Mercury, rock musician (of Parsi descent)
- Sangita Myska, BBC journalist, documentary maker, TV & Radio presenter
- Deepak Obhrai PC MP, longest continuously-serving Conservative Member of Canadian Parliament
- Rakesh Rajani, civil society and global development leader
- Ian Iqbal Rashid, filmmaker
- Mohamed Raza, Member of the Zanzibar House of Representatives
- Ally Rehmtullah, fashion designer
- Abdul Sheriff, historian
- Issa G. Shivji, author and academic
- Sonia Tumiotto, athlete and influencer

== Gallery ==
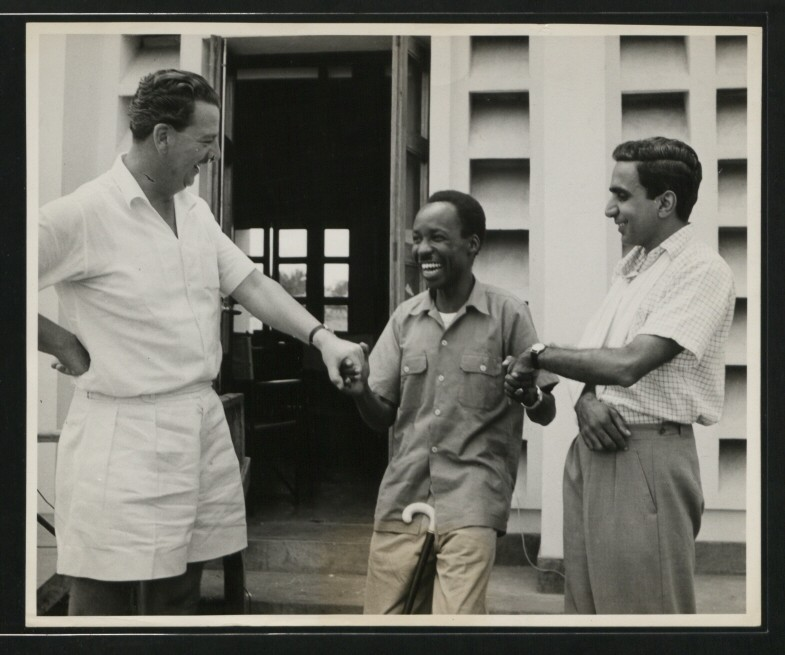
Julius Nyerere with Amir Jamal (r)

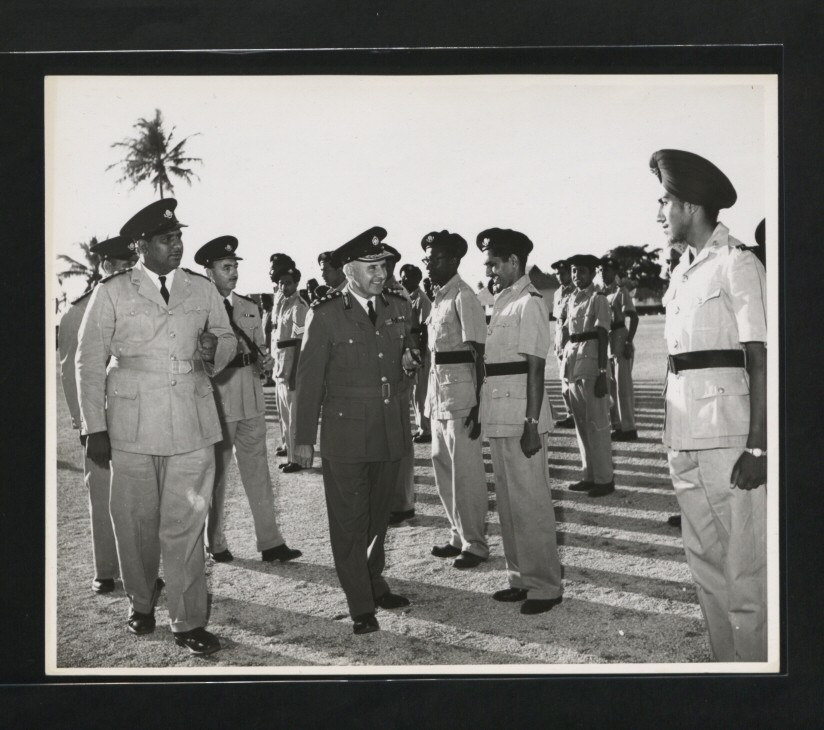
St. John Ambulance Brigade parade

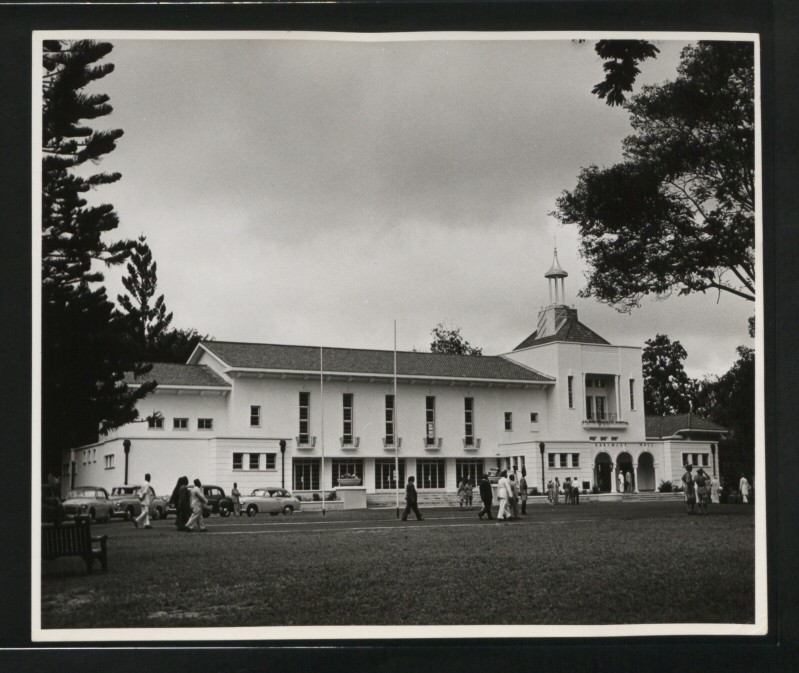
Karimjee Hall, seat of the parliament in Dar es Salaam

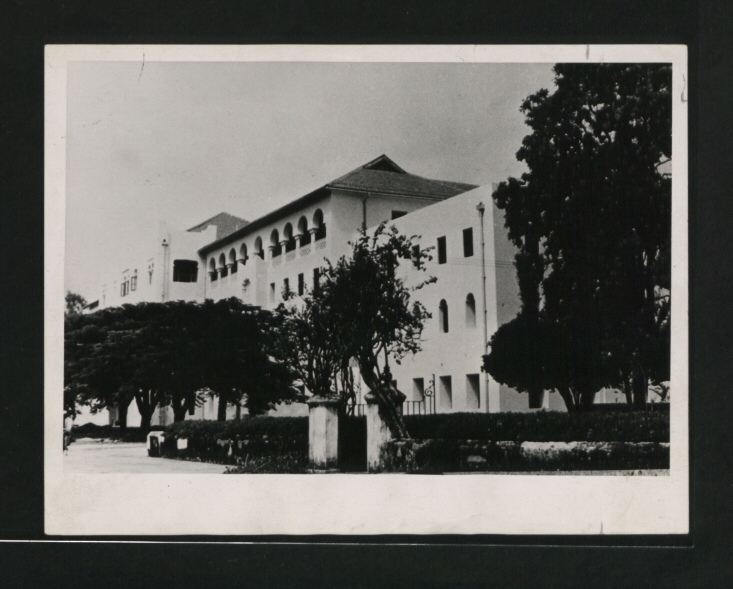
The Hassanali Karimjee Jivanjee Hospital, Zanzibar

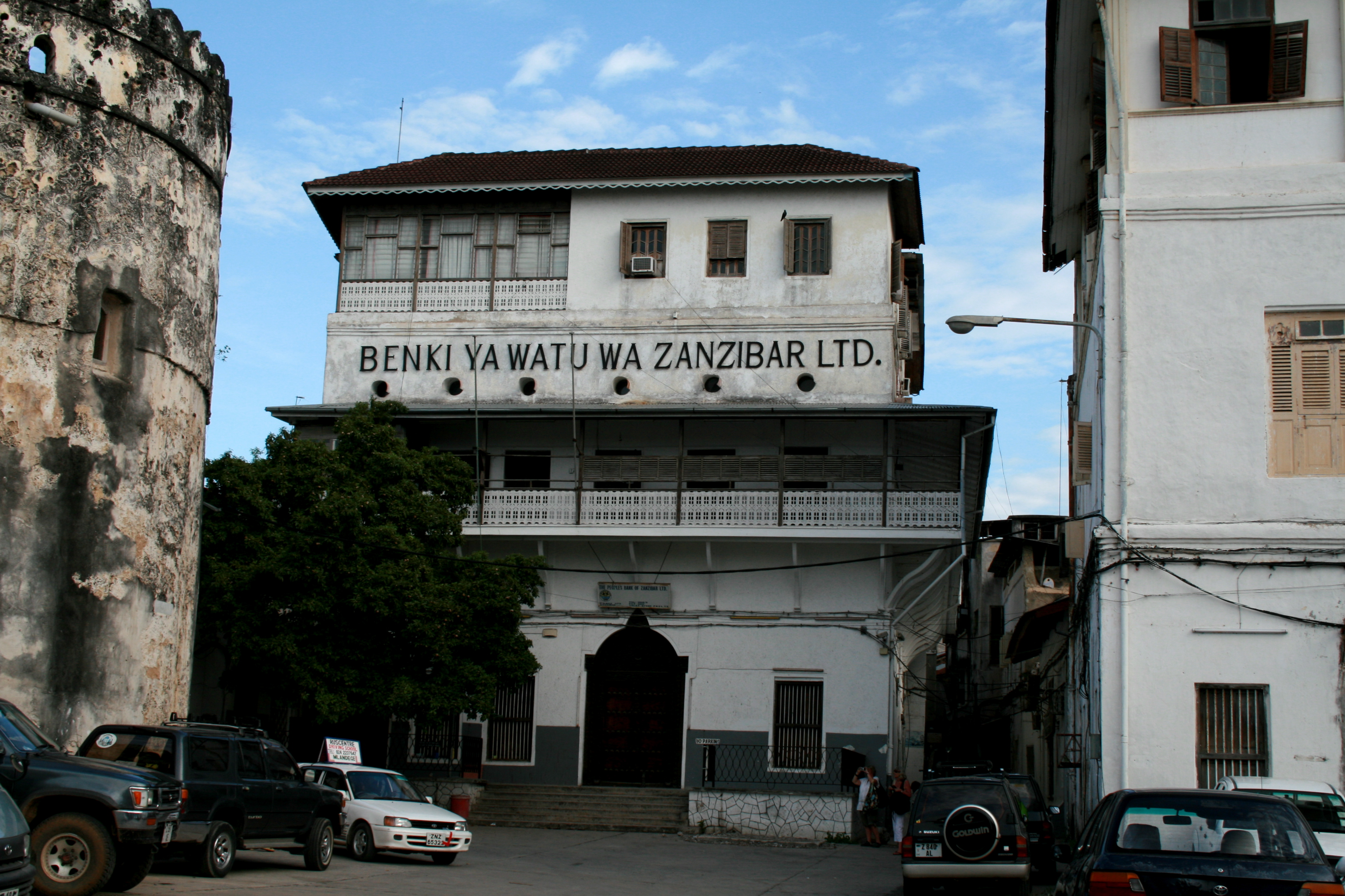
The former headquarters of Karimjee Co in Zanzibar

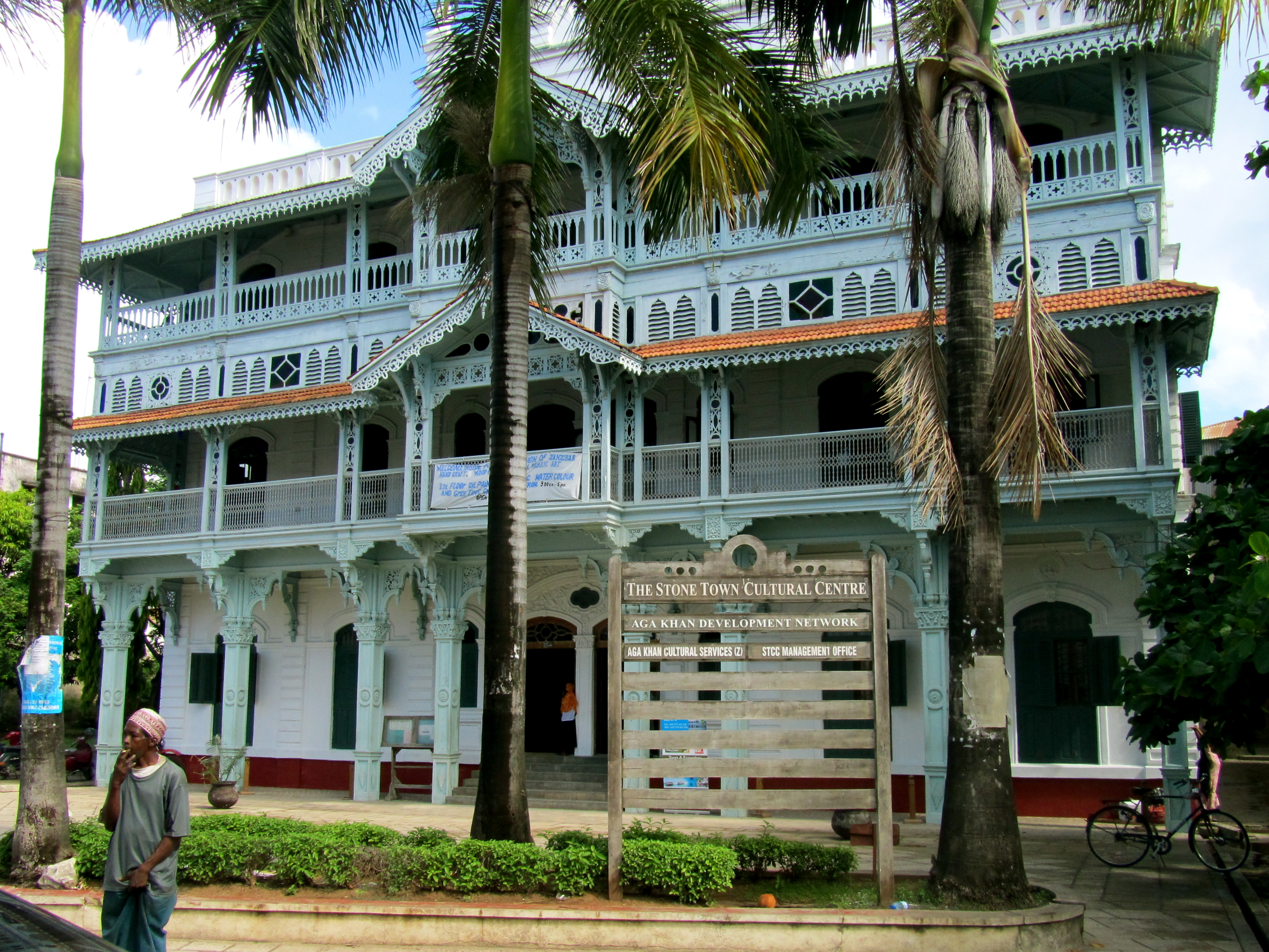
The former Ithnashiri Dispensary, Zanzibar

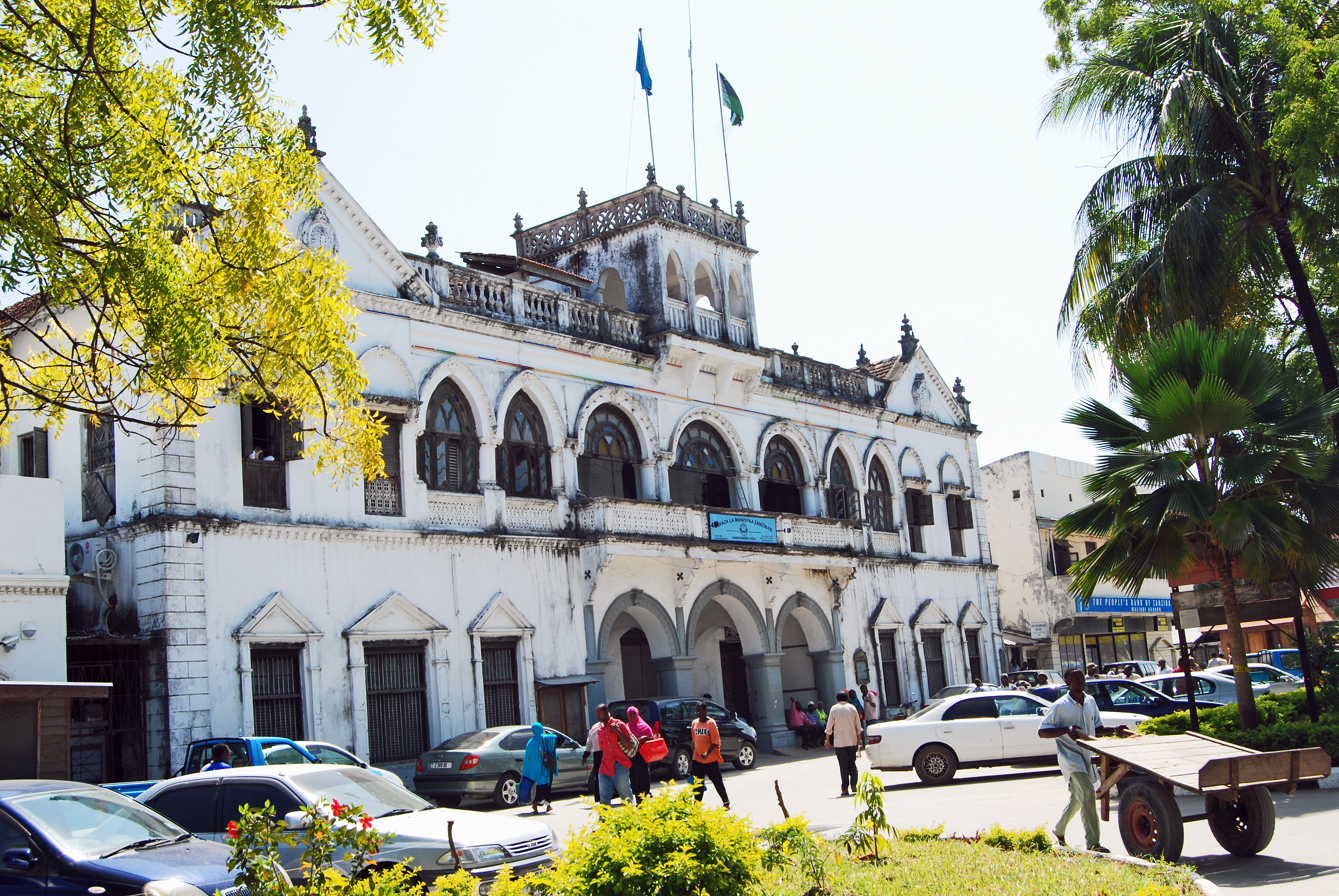
Bharmal Building, currently used as a municipal building

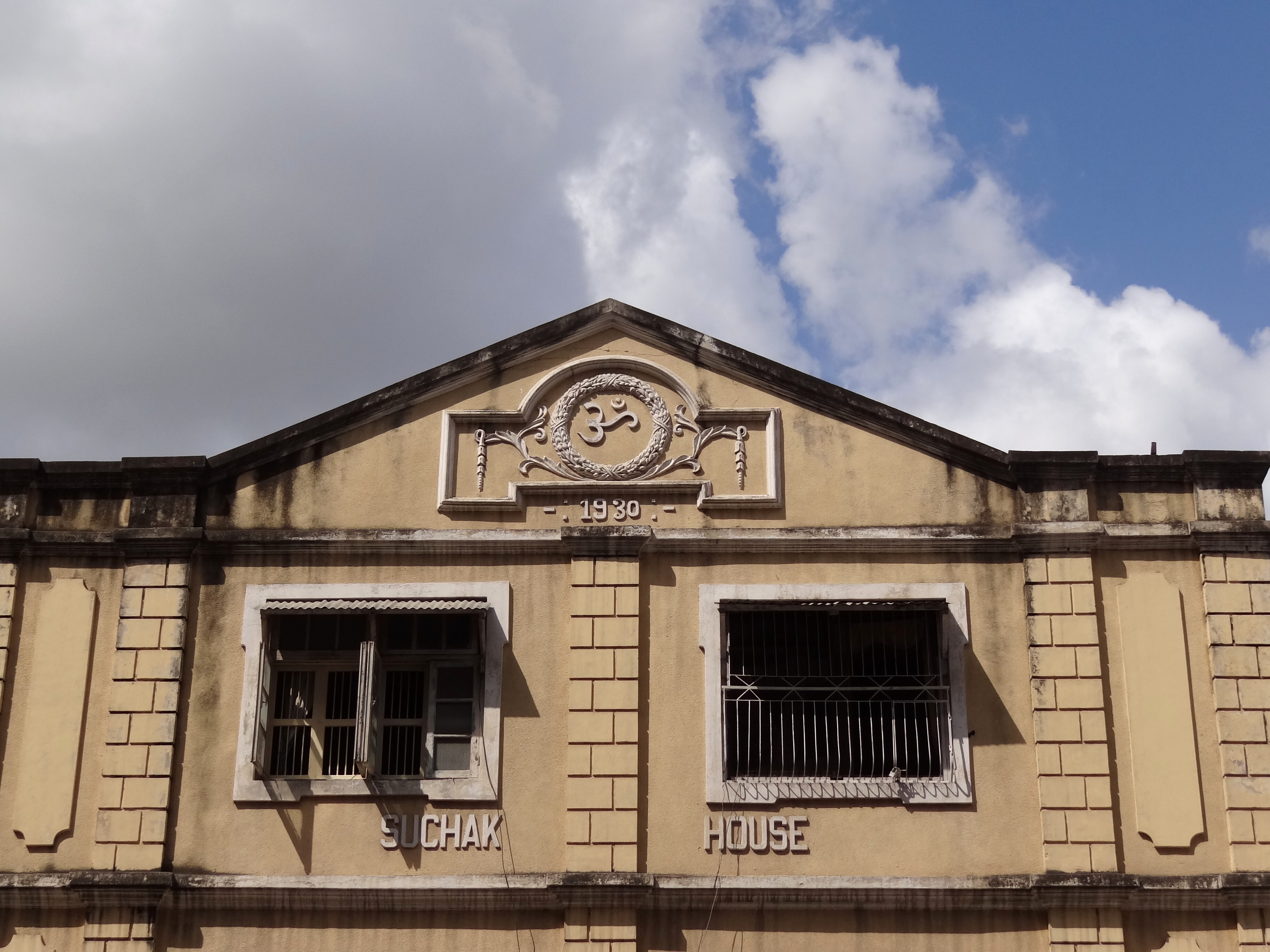
A colonial era building with the Om symbol (1930)

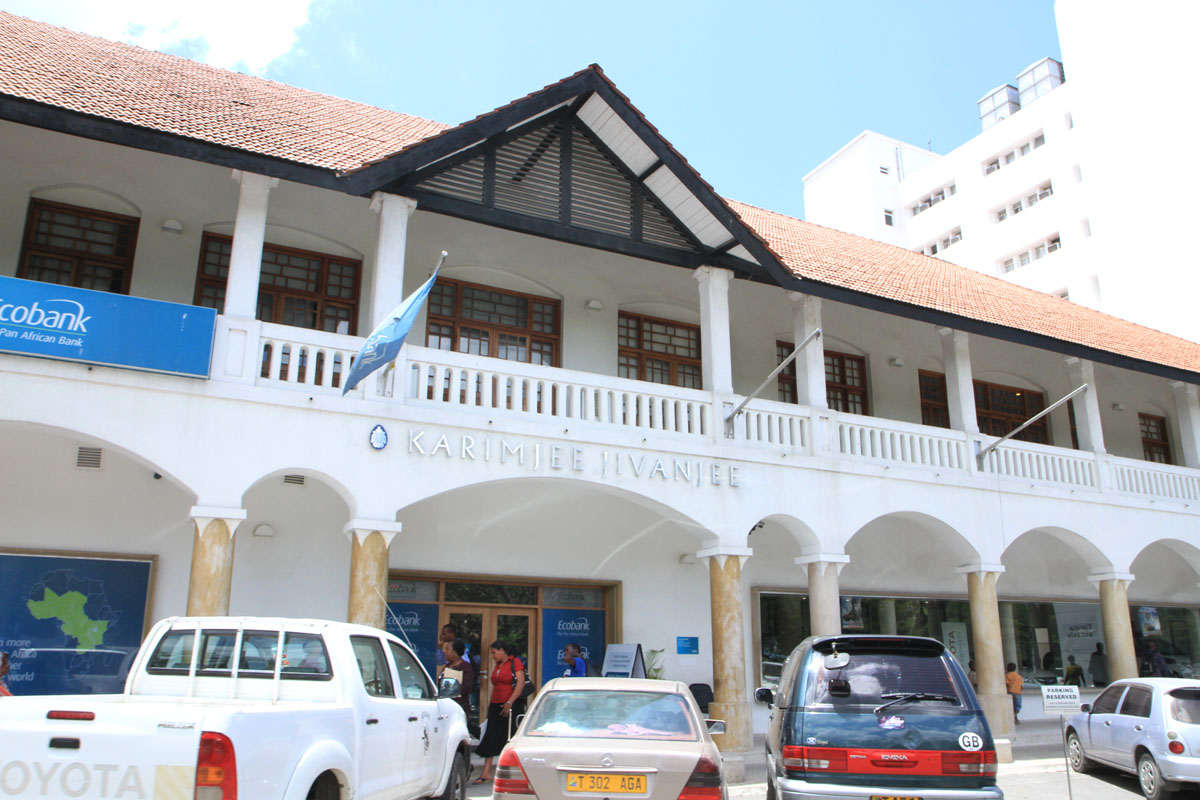
Karimjee Jivanjee Office in Dar es Salaam

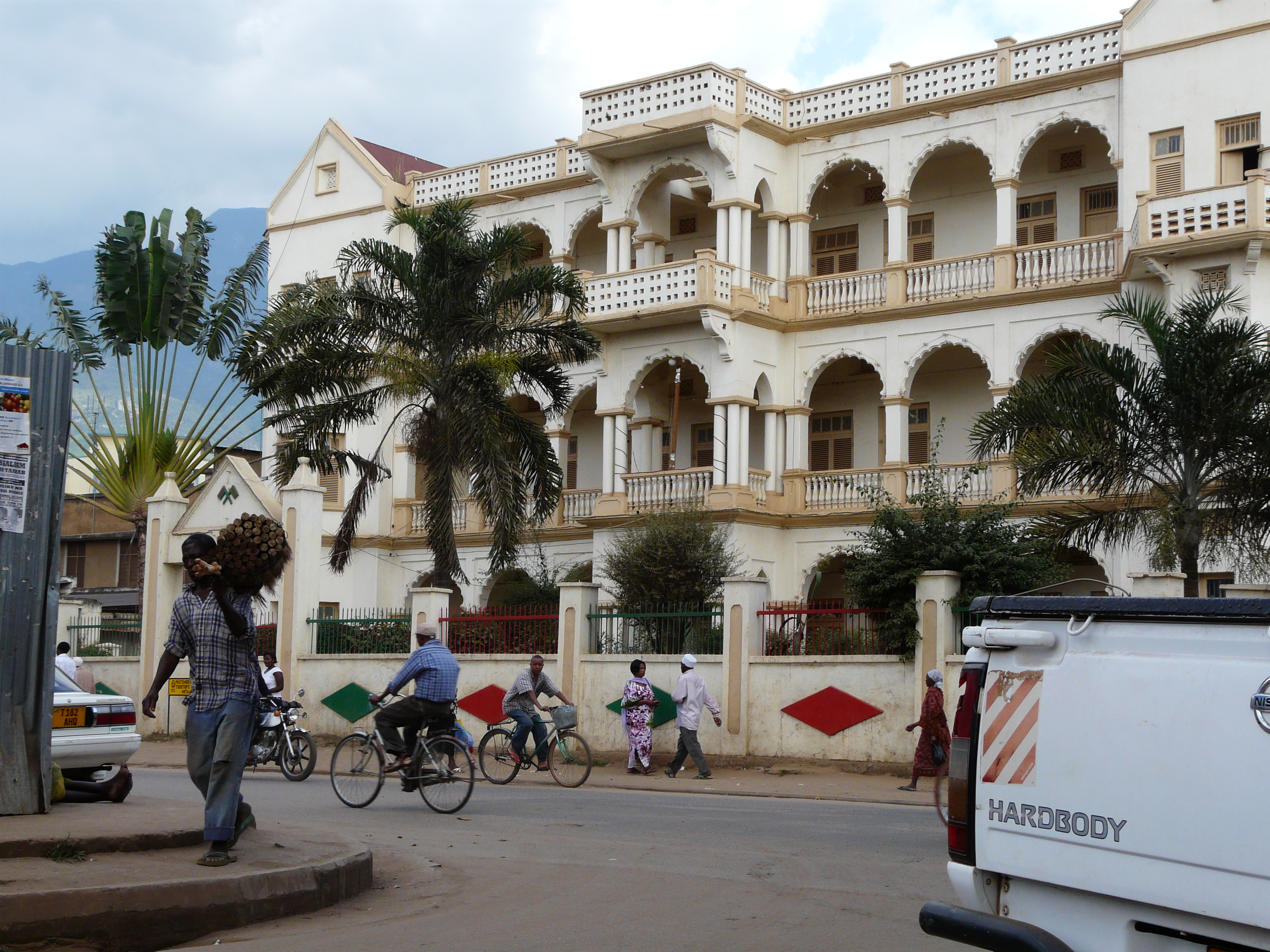
Morogoro Jamatkhana

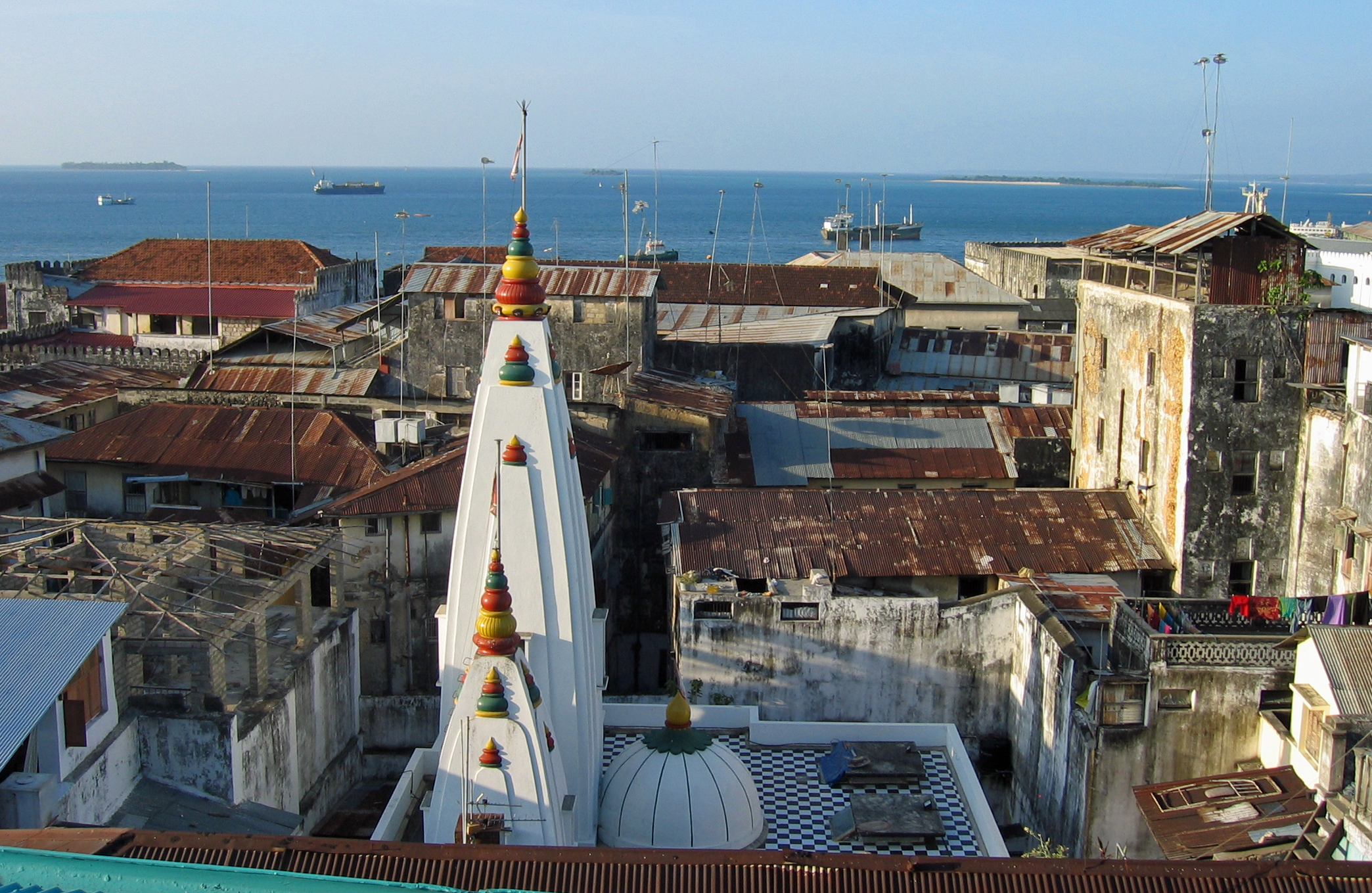
Shakti Temple, Zanzibar

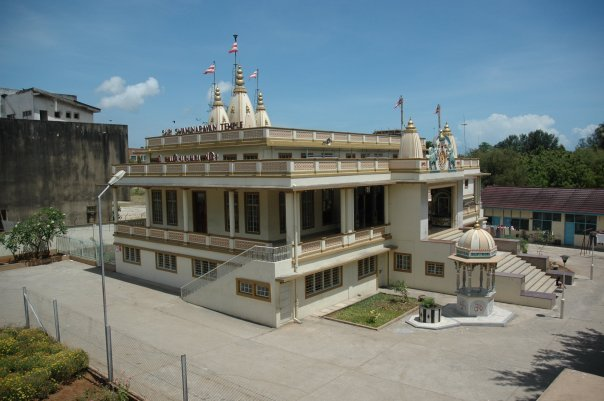
Swaminarayan Temple

== See also ==
- Indian diaspora in Southeast Africa
- Chinese people in Tanzania
- Shirazi people
- India–Tanzania relations
