= Tulia Ackson =

Speaker of the National Assembly of Tanzania

The Honourable Tulia Ackson MP
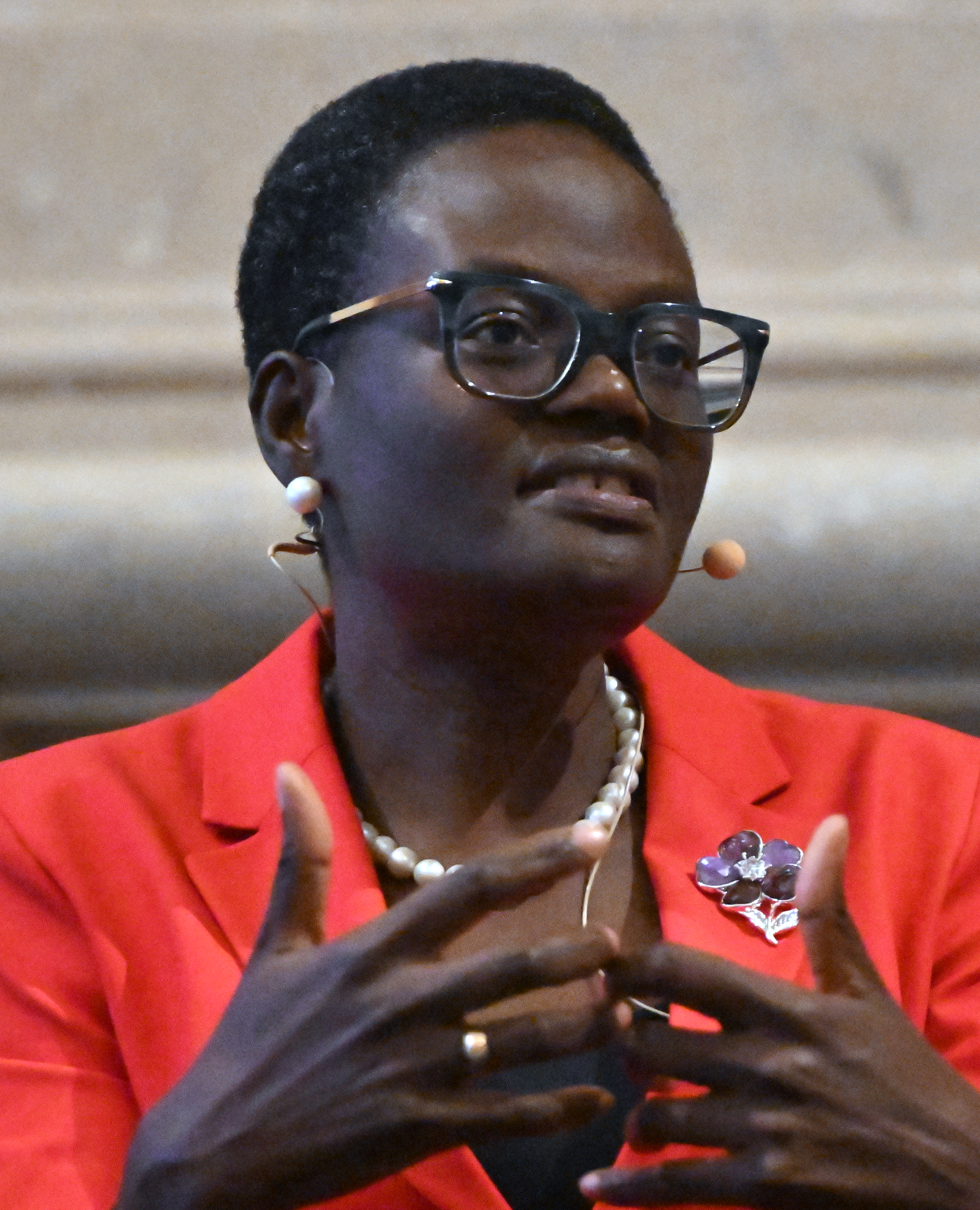
- Ackson in 2024

31st President of the IPU
- In office 27 October 2023 – 9 October 2026
- Preceded by: Duarte Pacheco
- Succeeded by: Milton Dick

7th Speaker of the National Assembly of Tanzania
- In office 1 February 2022 – 10 November 2025
- President: Samia Suluhu
- Preceded by: Job Ndugai
- Succeeded by: Mussa Zungu

Deputy Speaker of National Assembly of Tanzania
- In office November 2015 – 31 January 2022
- President: John Magufuli
- Preceded by: Job Ndugai
- Succeeded by: Iddi Azzan

Member of the National Assembly of Tanzania
- Incumbent
- Assumed office 19 November 2015
- Preceded by: Anna Makinda

16th Deputy Attorney General of Tanzania
- In office 9 September 2015 – 15 November 2015
- President: Jakaya Kikwete
- Preceded by: George Masaju

Member of the 1st Constituent Assembly of Tanzania
- In office 18 February 2014 – 2 October 2014
- Appointed by: Jakaya Kikwete
- President: Jakaya Kikwete

Personal details
- Born: 23 November 1976 (age 49) Bulyaga, Tukuyu, Rungwe District, Mbeya Region, Tanzania
- Education: University of Dar es Salaam (LL.B); University of Dar es Salaam (LL.M); University of Cape Town(PhD)
- Profession: Lawyer
- Website: https://www.agctz.go.tz/

Tulia Ackson LL-Q7838 (swa)-Byera04-Tulia Ackson.wav (born 23 November 1976) is a Tanzanian politician who served as the Speaker of the National Assembly of Tanzania from 2022 to 2025. She was appointed a Member of Parliament by President John Magufuli. On 27 October 2023, she is the President of the Inter-Parliamentary Union (IPU) through the meeting convened at Luanda Angola where she passed other contestants by a great margin.

== Early life ==
Ackson was born on 23 November 1976 in Bulyaga Ward, Tukuyu Division, Rungwe District, Mbeya Region.

== Education ==
Ackson passed her primary education at Mabonde Primary School in Tukuyu from 1984 to 1990 where she obtained a certificate of Primary Education. She was selected to join Loleza Girls Secondary School in Mbeya where she obtained a certificate of Secondary Education in 1994, and obtained an Advanced Certificate of Secondary Education at Zanaki Girls Secondary School. She then joined the University of Dar es Salaam in 1998 where she obtained a bachelor's degree in Laws in 2001. Ackson graduated with a master's degree in Law in 2003. In 2004 she did her bar examinations and obtained a Certificate for Legal Practice in Tanzania. She was admitted at the University Cape Town in 2005 for doctoral studies and obtained a doctorate in Philosophy in 2007.

== Career ==
Ackson joined the University of Dar es Salaam in 2001 as a postgraduate teaching assistant. She was promoted in 2004 to an assistant lecturer after successful completion of her master's degree in Law. In 2007 she was promoted to a lecturer after obtaining a doctorate. In 2009 she became the Associate Dean of the University of Dar es Salaam School of Law and served in that position for a total of six years, thus, two terms of three years consecutively. She was promoted to a senior lecturer in 2011. In February 2014 Ackson was appointed by the President of Tanzania, Jakaya Kikwete, as a member of the first Constituent Assembly of Tanzania, representing higher learning institutions. She is a Member of Tanganyika Law Society, East African Law Society, and Southern African Development Law Society.

Ackson is an expert in social security law, labour law, wildlife management laws, trusts, probate and administration of estates law, project financing and mining law.

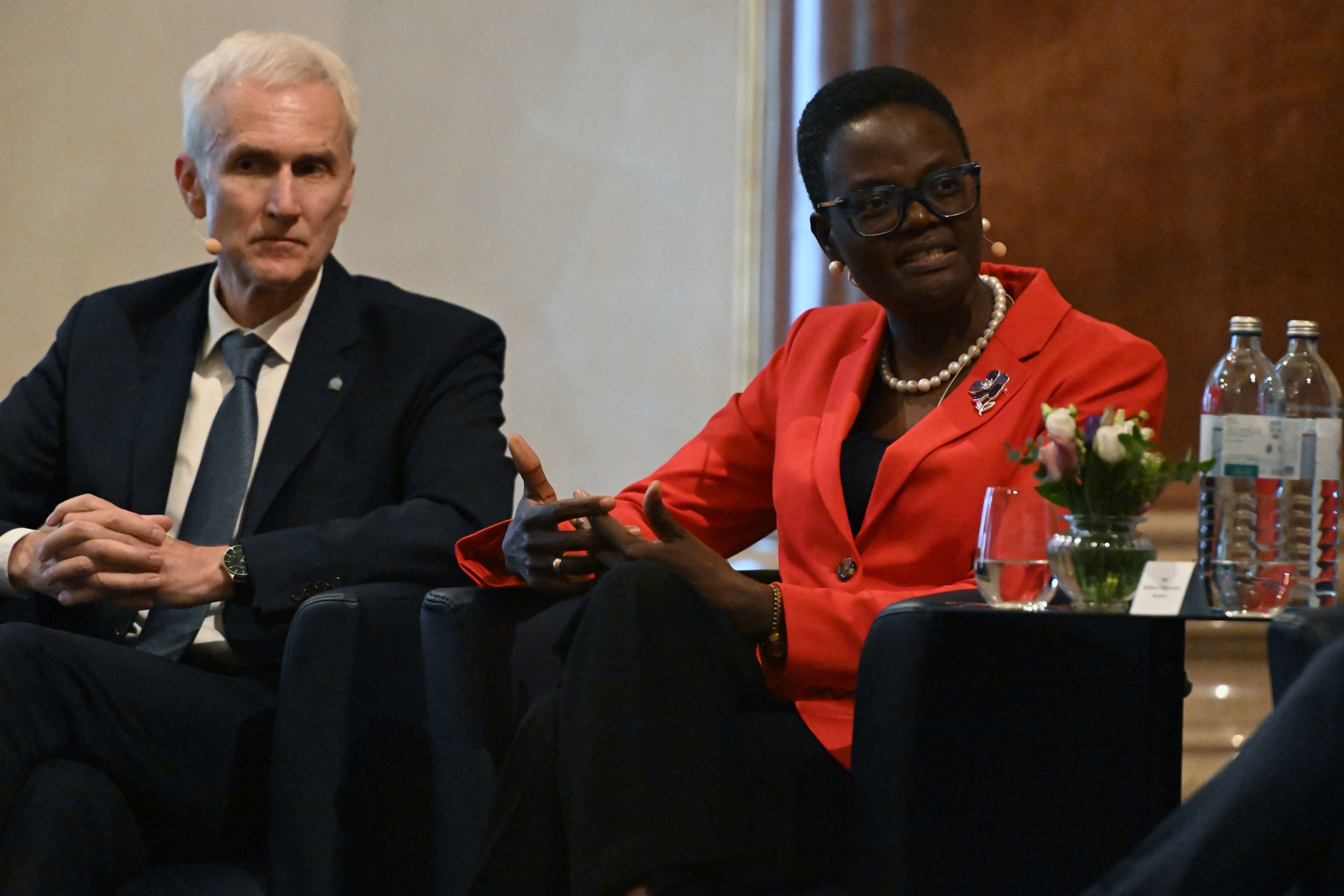
IAEA (International Atomic Energy Agency) in 2024 - Tulia Ackson (icons2024ns1479) (53734930669)

Ackson's experience also includes general commercial agreements, such as joint ventures, agency agreements, distributorship agreements, service agreements, mergers and acquisitions, initial public offerings, management buy-outs, employment, commercial and competition law.

Ackson is a practitioner with over 10 years' experience in employment law. She regularly writes articles and talks on employment law matters and her practice covers all aspects of Tanzania employment law, from hiring, to firing, to handling disputes between employers and employees.

She was appointed 7th Speaker of the National Assembly on 1 February 2022.

== Presidential appointments ==
Ackson was appointed by President Jakaya Kikwete as Deputy Attorney General, serving from 9 September 2015 to 15 November 2015.

On 16 November 2015 Ackson Mwansasu was appointed a Member of Parliament by President John Magufuli.
