= Reggae music in Kenya =

Kenyan musical scene

Reggae music by most Kenyan artists is mainly a fusion of Jamaican reggae and local styles that incorporate benga music and other genres popular in Kenya like hip hop. There's however, artists who have embraced the genre staying true to its Jamaican roots like Lavosti, Shamir & Cathy Matete.

In Kenya, reggae music is accessed through radio stations, night clubs, privately owned minibuses commonly known as matatus, private CD collections, unlicensed CD compilations, shared MP3 collections, YouTube, and other websites.

Reggae music has had a significant influence on the entertainment, culture, craft occupations and development of Sheng slang in Kenya. Reggae music in Kenya is viewed as a powerful agent of both positive and negative social changes such as calls for freedom, tolerance, unity and the drugs subculture.

== History ==
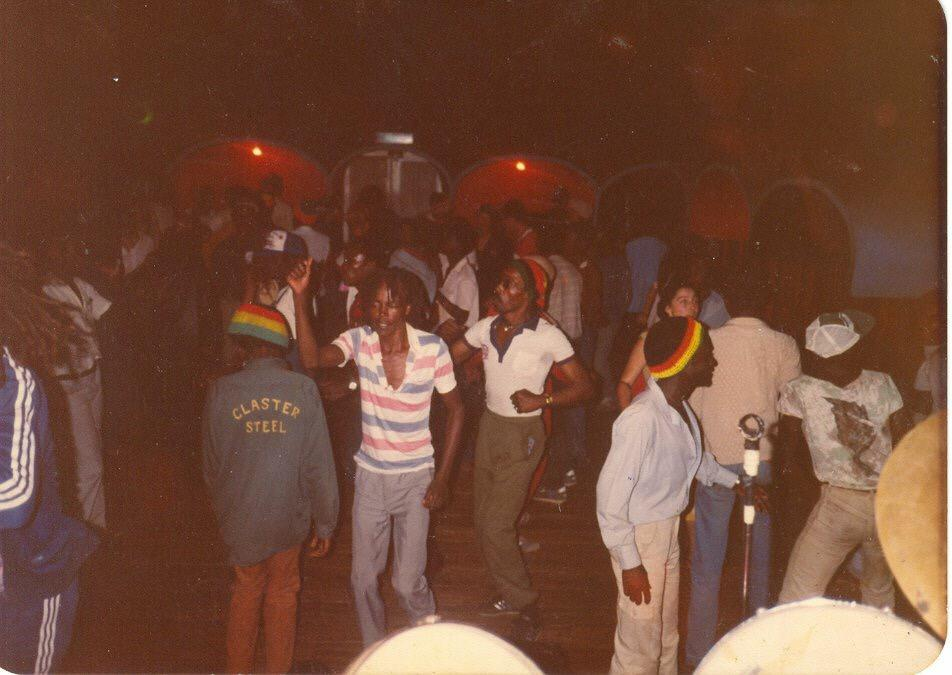
Club Shashamane International in Nairobi Kenya was among the first Kenyan night clubs to host reggae shows

While reggae music had already made its way in Kenya by the late 1970s, it was not until the early 1990s that local radio stations and television began making shows and programmes solely for reggae music despite it being formally banned on the Voice of Kenya, then the sole national broadcaster owned and controlled by the State. Reggae groups and artists like Bob Marley, Jimmy Cliff, Don Carlos, Burning Spear, Wailing Souls and Peter Tosh were the most loved and had a profound impact that went on to shape most of the local artists, reggae shows and even the development of culture and entertainment in Kenya. A number of nightclubs, themed with reggae music burgeoned up and down Nairobi city, most notably; Monte Carlo night club on Accra Road, Shashamane International and Hollywood club.

=== Kenyan reggae DJs ===
Reggae Sounds, derived from Jamaican sound system is a term use to describe a group of reggae Disk jockeys in Kenya who provide entertainment mainly by hosting reggae related events and shows, first gained popularity in the 1990s with notable groups such as Omega Sounds, King Lions Sounds, Livity Sounds, Jahmbo Sounds, King Jahmbo Sounds and Shashamane Intl being among the first to be formed. These groups assisted most reggae djs in their careers, a notable example is a more recent group called Dohty Family Sounds, founded by Chris Odhiambo popularly known as DJ Kriss Darling.

Other reggae sounds that emerged in recent years include; Rastyle Sounds (Formerly Firehouse Sounds) Mau Mau Sounds, Supremacy Sounds (formerly Black Supremacy Sounds), Rebel Liberation Sounds, Trench Town Entertainment Jahfulnoize Intl, Shanachie Sounds, One Vibe Entertainment, Dynamic Spellbound Sounds, Big Ship Sounds and FieldMarshall Entertainment.

Kenyan Djs have also helped in pioneering reggae music in the country with Legendary Jah'key Malle, the late Papa Lefty, Papa Charlie, Papa nasty (Radio Citizen FM), Selector King Monday (deceased), King Tubbs, Prince Otach (UK), Papa Bingi (based in USA), DJ Ras JahKim, Selector FieldMarshall, Dj lastborn ((deceased) One and Junior Dread being one of the earliest pioneers.

Other Djs who have recently been championing reggae music include; Zj Heno, Selector Denoh, DJ Stevo Junior, Dj Mohwak, Dj Tsunami, Deejay Stitchy, Selector King Rebel (Peter Kamau Waithera) DJ Stichie, Talia Oyando, G. Money, Kriss Darling (Christone Odhiambo, Muzikal Sheriff, DJ Rytrap, Dj robah, Dj mahgoz, Dj natty bwoy, Dj mantell, selekta willie and Dj Chara.

=== Reggae on Kenyan radio ===
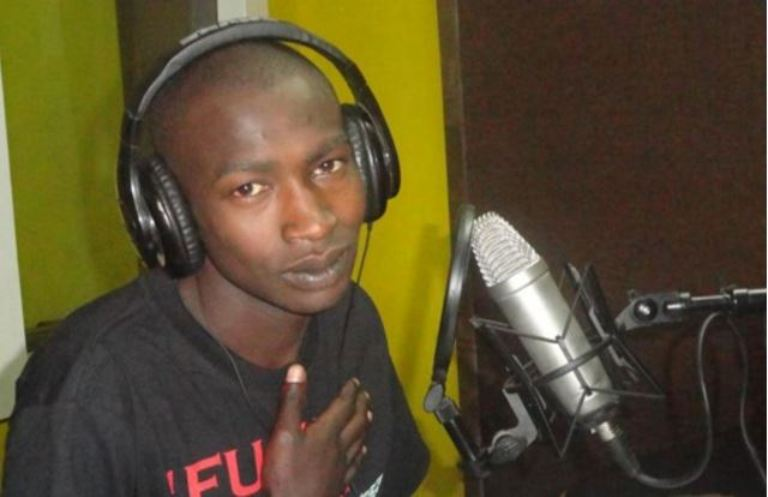
James Kang'ethe, popularly known as Bonoko, is a radio presenter at Ghetto radio, a station known for its reggae themed programmes

Reggae and the associated Jamaican culture became so popular in Kenya that in the early 1990s, the government-owned Kenya Broadcasting Corporation KBC radio station launched the program Reggae Times for reggae fans who tuned to the English service on Tuesday mornings. The show was presented by veteran reggae disk jockey, Jeff Mwangemi.

In August 2005, Metro FM, a subsidiary of the government-owned Kenya Broadcasting Corporation (KBC), became an exclusive 24-hour reggae station whose slogan was House of Reggae. Four years later after its launch on 30 January 2009, Metro FM hosted the first Ever Radio Sound Clash in Kenya Between Rebel Liberation Sounds from Githurai 45 Vs Existenz Sounds from Jericho and also in Africa. It was hosted By Dj Stano and Njambi Koikai. Later on in 2011, Metro FM switched from reggae and became Venus FM, a station that mainly focused on women, this left many Kenyan reggae fans disappointed, however, this did not help with the struggling status of metro FM even after rebranding itself, and in the same year the radio station went completely off-air.

The gap left by Metro FM was soon filled by Ghetto Radio, a sheng speaking radio station claiming to be the voice of the youth in the Kenyan Ghettos. James Kang'ethe, popularly known as 'Bonoko' alongside 'Ambuside' who is currently a radio presenter at Radio Jambo worked together on the show in its early years.

Drop Zone Assembly, a reggae show hosted on Hot 96 is among many of the recent radio shows at the forefront of championing reggae music in Kenya. Drop Zone is hosted by Rapcha the Sayantist.

=== Rise of dancehall reggae in Kenya ===
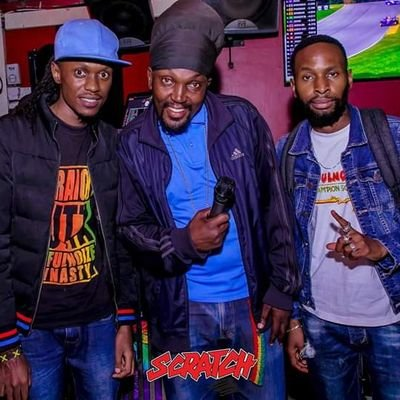
Stephantom wargamble (middle) is a Kenyan dancehall reggae artist

Up until the late 1990s, reggae in Kenya was known as the poor man's music, its popularity, however, caught the attention of the emerging FM radio stations and in order to deal with the perception that reggae music was odious and only belonged to the underprivileged members of the community and also to attract listeners who could generate advertising revenue, the new FM radio stations concentrated on the emerging Dancehall brand of reggae.

Dancehall reggae had softer and simpler beats than roots or ragga and it rarely projected the Rastafarian culture, anti-colonialism or African emancipation, but rather it mostly focused on love songs in an urban setting with extensive use of Jamaican Patois. Some Kenyan fans of roots reggae expressed disappointment with the emergence of Dancehall reggae. The criticism was mostly based on lack of a communal African agenda within dancehall reggae and the watering down of reggae into mere expressions of bodily desire and materialism. This brought together reggae artists and groups like Badman collage, Stephantom Wargamble and Daddy poa who recorded single tracks on dancehall reggae songs that were unprejudiced, tracks like "Wacha Icheze"(let the music play) which became an instant hit in the clubs and radio stations, this wave introduced another form of music distribution where most local reggae artists felt they didn't get enough air play on the station and street mixtapes were born.

=== Reggae on Kenyan TV ===
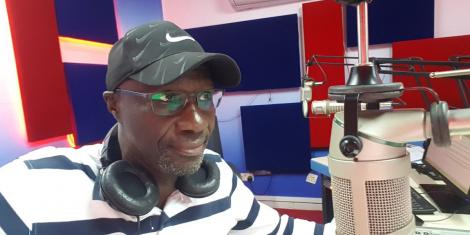
Fred Obachi Machoka, a veteran journalist was among the first television presenters to host the earliest reggae shows on Kenyan TV

Kenya Broadcasting Corporation hosted the first reggae show on Kenyan TV, the show, Music Time was hosted by Fred Obachi Machoka, a veteran journalist and radio presenter, however, the cost of purchasing a television set was too high at the time for most fans and this was only perhaps a leisure only afforded to the privileged members of the society. Reggae artist's featured at that time included Shabba Ranks, Yellowman, Ras Kimono and the popular English reggae and pop band UB40.

Around 1992, Kenya Television Network launched the program Rastrut, a thirty-minute show dedicated to reggae music and hosted by Jimmy Gathu, a top media personality in Kenya. The free to air Kenyan Television Network KTN continues to be the only Kenyan television station that has ever had a show dedicated to reggae and specifically associated it with the religious and cultural ideas of the Rastafarian movement. This is seen in the choice of the name Rastrut and the use of the characteristic Green-Yellow-Red as the background colours of the show.

After the digital television transition in 2013, the number of TV stations hosting reggae shows rose steadily, most notably Island vibes on Y254TV (a channel owned by KBC and launched on 6 February 2017) hosted by Stephantom Wargamble and Mc scertchie, the show revolves around discussions on the most pressing topics of society and things that affects the life of the Kenyan youth. The station also links local artists to producers and supports underground reggae artist. Kenyatta University's Television (KUTV) also hosts a roots reggae music show called Reggae Iration. The show has various segments namely: Inner Mi yard, Wisdom knowledge and overstanding, Artiste of the day, Live interviews and updates on the latest news in the reggae world.

Citizen TV has had one of the longest running shows on Kenyan TV, the One Love show that is hosted by Dominic Kariuki Ngori popularly known as Coco Soboo and Tallia Oyando.

=== Past reggae events in Kenya ===
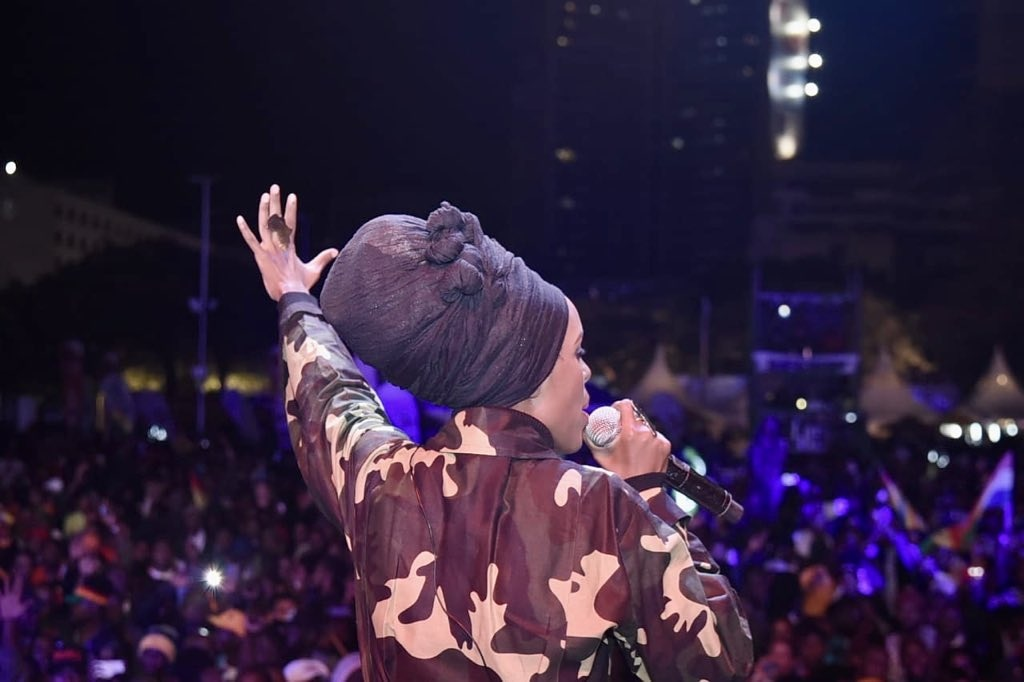
Njambi koikai popularly known as fayah mama, has been featured in reggae events in Kenya

Over the years, many top reggae artists have visited Kenya and hosted their shows in the country's big cities like Nairobi and Mombasa. Among them were Lucky Dube, Gregory Isaacs, Joseph Hill, Buju Banton and Tarrus Riley. The most notable event, however, was the Lucky Dube show that took place at Ngong Racecourse on 4 December 1998, dubbed the most spectacular music event ever staged in Kenya, it included other notable reggae artists like Levi Roots, Johnny Clark, and Jah Shakah. According to a journalist at nation media, 'Lucky Dube gave-it-all stage gymnastics, and belting out melodies in three octaves to send the crowd into a stampede that had bouncers called in'. The show was sponsored by the East African Breweries. On 20 October 2018 Tarrus Riley and Everton Blender hosted an anticipated reggae show at KICC, other reggae artists have also performed at KICC most notably, Chronixx in 2013 and 21 July 2018 and Buju Banton on 15 February 2020. Other reggae events hosted in Kenya include International Reggae Day hosted on 1 July 2018.

== Reggae MCs ==
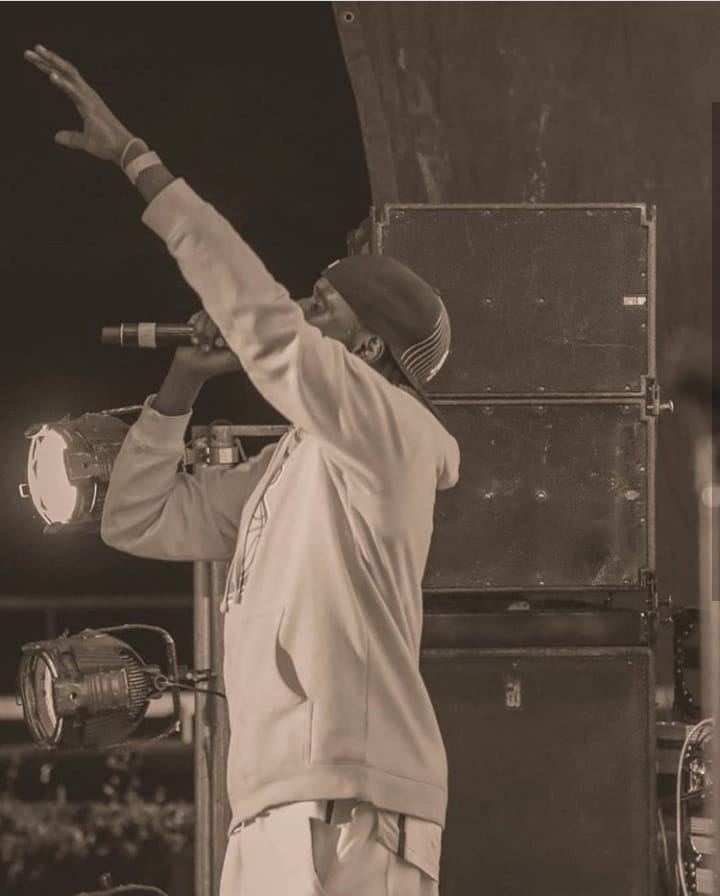
MC Supa Marcus, a popular Kenyan reggae MC

Kenyan reggae MCs, like Jamaican deejays, chant, make statements (however unorthodox) and act as conventional hosts to jam sessions, raves, local and international reggae events in Kenya. Along with reggae DJs (also known as selectors), reggae MCs in Kenya host events where they play a compilation of songs (mostly reggae and dancehall music) which is later compiled, distributed and sold to clubs, matatus, resellers and individuals. Kenyan reggae MCs mostly sing along or chant over a rhythm or song while engaging a crowd. Most notable Kenyan MCs include; Mc Fullstop (deceased), Ras Burner, Mc Supa marcus, Mc Daddy Konia (deceased), Njambi Koikai, MC Jahwatchy, Mc Teargas, Mc Stephantom Wargamble, Mc Ghettochild, Mc CureZediambo and Mc Kadamawe, Mc Smarter Upscale Clan (Dj Mullaz & Mc Dido) .

== Themes of Kenyan reggae songs ==
- criticism to political systems and social injustice
- love, humanity, intimacy and relationships
- advocacy for social reformation and behavioral change
- anti colonialism and anti racism.

=== Reggae influence on Kenyan gospel music ===
Kenyan gospel music producers often overlay conventional Swahili singing on reggae styled tracks and this partly obscures the reggae nature of the drum beats, guitar chops and bass-guitars in the songs. Consequently, only a few listeners would identify such songs as reggae especially when the singers are not Rastafarians or lack Jamaican patois. Such Kenyan gospel songs include; Damu Ya Yesu and Yesu Wangu na Mpenda by Mary Atieno Ominde, Mbingu Zahubiri by Paul Kigame and Waraka wa Hamani by Bahati Bukuku. The nature of the rhythms among these songs strongly suggest the hidden correlation with reggae music.

Between 1997 and 2002, the US-based Christian Reggae group Christafari enjoyed notable popularity in Kenya through KTN, Family FM (now Radio 316) and Tune in Music Stores. During one of their visits to Kenya, they witnessed the tragic state of the Kibera slums in the capital city of Nairobi and composed the song Nairobi.

== Reggae influence on Kenyan culture ==
Reggae music has had a profound influence on the culture and entertainment in Kenya, however, this influence is greatly prevalent among people living in ghettos, shanty towns and a small but rising number in urban areas. This is mostly due to the presence of night clubs, video parlours and public transport vehicles that continuously or regularly feature reggae music and shows as part of daily routine. Themes derived from reggae music are used to decorate mini-buses, alter the way of speech, ideas and conduct among Kenyans.

=== Reggae influence on Kenyan slang (sheng) ===
Reggae music is so loved in Kenya that it is common to hear Kenyan youth speaking Jamaican Patois on the streets of Nairobi, especially in the slum areas. There are Kenyan Rastafarians who learnt English by listening to reggae music and reggae fans. Examples of words added to the Sheng vocabulary are-

- Jah meaning a reference to the underclass entertainment culture in Kenya. To many Kenyan Sheng speakers who may also be reggae fans, the word Jah does not necessarily refer to the All-Mighty or the ideals of the Rastafarian movement;
- Jah blessings! Jah guidance! Meaning the All-Mighty bless you or may the All-Mighty be with you;
- Massive meaning great and also as a positive reference to a place that has reggae fans e.g., Buruburu Massive, Jericho Massive etc.;
- true sound and true dat which are a way of telling someone that what you have said is true;
- tings a guan. Although the original Jamaican word guan means trouble or a bad situation, many Kenyans slang speakers use it with a positive or commendable meaning!
- the use of man as a prefix (e.g., Youtman meaning the youth or Man Joshua meaning Joshua our man or friend);
- use of the phrase Man like as a respectful title e.g. Man Like Joshua, Man Like James etc.;
- use of the word Respect as a salutation, greeting or in place of bye bye to express good wishes;
- use of the pronoun I as a title for reggae fans for example, Wale ma I wame kuja meaning the reggae fans have come.

The usage of the words massive and man like were creations of DJ. Jeff Mwangemi of KBC, presenter of Reggae Times

=== Reggae and Rastafarian culture in Kenya ===
The state of reggae music in Kenya cannot be divorced from the Kenyan versions of the Rastafarian culture and the matatu sub-culture of Nairobi. It has to be judged within the context of how the Kenyan population perceives the local Rastafarian movement and the messages in the reggae music of the 1990s. Even more significant is the position of the Rastafarian movement within the social-economic divide between the middle class and the poor lower class population of the Kenyan urban areas. Most of the genre's pioneers like Bob Marley, Peter Tosh and Bunny Wailer were all Rastafarians.

The Kenyan Rasta movement is mostly made up of men who are marginalized from the regular education system and are poor slum dwellers living at the edges of the urban areas. Many Kenyan craftsmen, matatu conductors, music instrumentalists, acrobats, traditional dancers and casual labourers express some form of Rastafarian expression as an alternative religion whose language and ideologies they can identify with.

For them, the Rastafarian movement is a social or religious grouping that does not have the formalism and officialdom of foreign western Christianity. Rasta culture offer them a flexible language and a cultural worldview that accommodates people of their economic class. It offers them a sense of social dignity derived from the mythical story of historic oppression.

=== Reggae, Rastafarian Culture and Kenyan dress ===
The spotting of dreadlocks by Kenyan women and men is not always an indicator of their inclinations to the Rastafarian movement or their love for reggae music. Many Kenyan Rastafarians spot a scarf, headband, bangle or shirt that has the black, green, yellow and red colours which are known as Rasta colours in Kenya. Many Kenyan craftsmen tend to associate themselves with the Rastafarian movement and consequently, almost half of the items sold in Kenyan curio shops have the green, yellow, red and black colours that characterize the Rastafarian movement. The use of the cannabis leaf symbol in Kenyan ghetto art works, dress items and matatu stickers has increased and this has only exacerbated negative publicity associated with reggae music in Kenya.

In some parts of Kenya and among some social groups, especially those in the coast province, rasta-colours are often associated with social groups that have nothing to do with either reggae or Rastafarians and may have a connection with drug dealing and petty theft.

=== Rastafarian ideology among Reggae fans ===
Kenyan Rastafarians display a noticeable ideological understanding of the lyrics in reggae songs and non-musical teachings of reggae musicians and writers. For example, whenever Kenyans confront a news item touching on racism, some Kenyan Rastas may be heard quoting Lucky Dube's song Different Colours One People as a moral proverb towards racial tolerance.

=== Reggae as the poor man's music ===
In Kenya, there is a stereotypical perception that reggae is the poor man's music. This is probably due to the recurrent themes of poverty and emancipation in Jamaican Roots reggae and its popularity among disenfranchised Kenyan youth.

The association of reggae with the lower class and economically sidelined population is suspected to be the reason why in 2011, the financially struggling 6 year old Metro FM changed from a purely reggae station to Venus FM with a programming scheme that could attract advertisements targeting typical urban office-class ladies.

The gap left by Metro FM was soon taken filled by Ghetto FM, a Sheng (Kenyan slang) speaking station that claims to be the voice of the youth in the Kenyan ghettos.

=== Reggae music and disability awareness ===
Due to the same factors that make reggae the style of choice by the underclass, reggae seems to be the style of choice by Kenyan persons who have disabilities or wish to create concern among able bodied persons. Professor Naaman, Mighty King Kong and Baba Gurston Opar of the Leonard Cheshire Disability Young Voices chose reggae as their medium. Gospel musicians Reuben Kigame and Mary Atieno also chose some of their songs to be in reggae style. Daddy Owen's song, Mbona explores the marginalization of persons living with disabilities and is done in a mild reggae style.

=== Reggae and the matatu industry ===
In the early 1990s, during the explosion of personal and portable music systems, it became fashionable for matatus (privately owned public service vehicles) to blast loud music despite protests by passengers and the illegality of the practice. Matatu serving different parts of Nairobi, the capital city, became associated with different styles of music. For example, those serving the eastern side were famous for ragga while those serving Kangemi were known for pop, RnB and the developing hip hop styles.

The matatus plying Kikuyu, Dagoretti, and Ngong areas focused on reggae and even today, they preferentially play Roots and Dancehall reggae. The liking for reggae spread to Kabete and Thika Matatus. It is worth noting that these matatu routes serve areas dominated by the Kikuyu ethnic group and its historic desire for emancipation from colonialism and oppression by the KANU government. Dagoretti is on the outskirts of Nairobi and has the social environment in which reggae music can flourish- a contradicting mix of poverty, wealth and rich ethnic history. The reggae bands Chaka Lion and Survivors are based in Dagoretti.

=== Reggae and East African history ===
Some researchers (Horace Campbell) associate the origin of the dreadlocks of the Rastafarian movement with those of the Kikuyu freedom fighters who were branded Mau Mau by the colonial authorities. Jamaican Rastafarian symbols such as the name Ras Tafari, the Lion of Judah and the green, yellow and red flag are derived from Ethiopia, which borders Kenya to the north. The Nyabinghi section of the Rastafarian movement derives its name from the Uganda and Rwandese regions west of Kenya.

Jamaican reggae groups and artists such as Black Uhuru and Ras Kenyatta derived their names from the Mau Mau related news that was flowing from Kenya in the 1950s. Rita Marley's song, Harambee is derived from the slogan call introduced by the former and first President of Kenya, Jomo Kenyatta, who was a Kikuyu.

In the late 1990s and early 2000s, at the climax of the anti-KANU efforts that were mostly led by Kikuyu politicians, the Kikuyu youth groupings known as Mungiki became indistinguishable from the Kenyan Rastafarians. Both groups spotted dreadlocks, reproductions of the Ethiopian green, yellow and red flag and both were known for heavy smoking of cigarettes, raw tobacco and marijuana. Due to their low-class and peri-urban status, many Kikuyu matatu drivers, conductors and operators who were reggae lovers inadvertently became members of the Mungiki movement. Even today, the average Kenyan associates the Rastafarian green, yellow and red regalia with Mungiki although the Mungiki sect officially identifies itself with the colours green, white, red and black.

== Negative publicity ==
=== Drug sub-culture ===
The reggae sub-culture in Kenya is strongly associated with beer partying, rowdy and theft-prone gigs, heavy cigarette smoking, khat chewing (locally known as miraa) and the use of cannabis (locally known as bhangi, weed, herb, marijuana, hazard, bomb, boza or stone

=== Theft of artistes' items ===
In Kenya, Reggae events are the most chaotic and theft laden gigs. Some local TV comedians make fun of this by stereotypically presenting all reggae fans as thieves who have no interest in reggae music. Due to the wide underclass following, many reggae fans see the reggae events as opportunities to steal from well-off fans. Some notable cases are as listed below Mismanagement of artistes

In June 2013, Alpha Blondy and Tarrus Riley jetted into Kenya but failed to show up at the KICC grounds where their fans rioted at 3 a.m. on realizing that the expected artistes would not perform.

=== Rowdiness of revelers ===
Due to the value attached towards cannabis by some reggae musicians and sections of the Rastafarian movement, reggae music is seen by some Kenyan youth as an expression of the licence to engage in unrestrained indulgence. Lucky Dube's concert in December 1998 at the Ngong Race Course grounds was so packed with revelers and numerous reported offenses that for the first time, Kenya Police transported drunkards and suspected petty thieves in police helicopters.

=== Violence and murder ===
According to Hillary Koech, a Kenyan media blogger and freelance journalist, underclass Kenyan reggae fans often carry ghetto- neighbourhood hostilities to reggae gigs and sometimes engage in murders over petty conflicts.

=== Gangsterism ===
The Kenyan brand of the Rastafarian movement is plagued by associations with social actions that are contrary to those regular rasta movements and the messages in reggae music. Bernard Matheri, a Most Wanted gangster who was shot dead by police in 1997 and was known as Rasta because of his dreadlocks. The mingling of Kenyan Rastafarians with the murderous acts of the Mungiki sect only tarnished the reputation of the rasta movement and reggae music further.

In parts of the Coast province of Kenya, the rasta colours green, yellow and red are a gangster identity that has nothing to do with either reggae or Rastafarians and is often associated with violent theft, drug dealing and homosexual unions that may involve European tourists.

=== Unauthorized distribution of reggae music ===
Reggae music is the most copied and plagiarized genre of music in Kenya. As of 2014, it is practically impossible to gain legitimate access to original CDs of reggae music originating from outside Kenya. It is also quite difficult to get full versions of reggae songs that do not have interjections, interruptions and self-promoting announcements by mixing DJs.

Unlike the 1990s, Kenyan DJs no longer mention the titles of the songs they play nor do they state the names of the singers or give a background history of the songs. Some DJs create mix-tapes or remixes of songs and then announce their own names over the remixes and unintentionally creating the impression that the songs are their own works.
