= Richard Bezuidenhout =

Tanzanian-Canadian actor

- Born: 10 August 1982 (age 44); Ilala, Tanzania
- Occupation: Actor
- Years active: 2007–present
- Known for: Winner of the Big Brother Africa (season 2)

Richard Dyle Bezuidenhout (born 10 August 1982) is a Tanzanian-born Canadian film actor and producer who won the first came to public attention for winning the second season of the reality competition Big Brother Africa in 2007.

== Career ==
=== Big Brother ===
Bezuidenhout is often cited as one of the most controversial Big Brother Africa winners. This is due to his sexual affair, despite being married himself with Nigerian contestant, Ofunneka Molokwu while intoxicated. Despite Ofunneka telling the show that she understood what was going on, many viewers accused Bezuidenhout of sexual abuse.

Even after winning, rumors of an affair between Bezuidenhout and his Angolan housemate Tatiana, was revealed. Also, fellow housemate Kemens blamed the show managers for his exit from the show labeling it as "planned" when to compared to Bezuidenhout's behaviour.

=== Acting and producing ===
Bezuidenhout's acting and producing careers began after winning Big Brother Africa in 2007. Right after the show, he was cast in Nollywood film Player no.1 with Ini Edo, Jackie Appiah. He followed these up with Bongo films including the 2008 film Family Tears collaborating with the Steven Kanumba and Wema Sepetu. He used part of the money he won in Big Brother Africa to buy filming equipment to start producing his own films. In 2011, he starred in the film, Zamora starring by Richa Adhia.

== Filmography ==
Television
Year	Name	Role	Notes
2007	Big Brother Africa (season 2)	Himself	
Film
Year	Name	Role	Notes
2007	Player no.1 (PT 1)	Playboy	Web
2008	Family Tears	Rich	DVD-Video
2011	Zamora		Web
