= Anna Abdallah =

Tanzanian politician

Honourable Anna Abdallah MP

Minister of Health
- In office 2000–2005
- President: Benjamin Mkapa

Minister of Works
- In office 1995–2000
- President: Benjamin Mkapa

Minister of State for Regional Administration and Local Government
- In office 1991–1995
- President: Ali Hassan Mwinyi

Personal details
- Born: 26 July 1940 (age 86) Mbeya Region,Tanganyika Territory
- Party: CCM
- Spouse: Pius Msekwa
- Education: Open University of Tanzania

Anna Margareth Abdallah (born 26 July 1940) is a Tanzanian Chama Cha Mapinduzi politician and a special seat Member of Parliament. She was a member of the National Legislative Assembly from 1987 to 1996. Anna has been the chairman of the National Movement People's Democratic Front Party since 2005, since she took over the reins as party leader, she has promoted women's rights, advocated for change in the gender-biased criminal justice system, supported education in indigenous languages, and campaigned for ethnic minority rights. She is the author of ten books, including Shettawa I kwannage ni kwijut, Hauta kwa! – Shettawa and Joy! Women Empowerment in Tanzania and much more.

== Education ==
For her primary education, Abdallah went to both Mtandi Primary School and Loleza Girls Middle School in Mbeya, Tanzania. Abdallah went to Tabora Girls Secondary School for secondary education. Abdallah received a Bachelor of Arts degree in sociology and housing from the University of Missouri, Columbia in the United States in 1963. In 1967, she received a diploma in Home Economics from the University of London (Queen Elizabeth College) in the United Kingdom.

== Career ==
Abdallah is a member of the ruling Chama Cha Mapinduzi party. Her experience in government began when she was named as one of the first female district commissioners in 1973. She first became a member of parliament in 1975, when there were only five other women members of parliament. As a qualified nurse, she was the Minister of Health for Tanzania from 2000 to 2005. Other government posts she has held include Minister for Public Works (1995–2000), Minister for Agriculture and Livestock Development (1991), and Minister for Local Government, Community Development, Co-operatives and Marketing and many others. Abdallah was the first woman chairperson of the committee on Defense and Security. In 1983, Abdallah was also given direct oversight of the construction of the new capital in Dodoma. She served as National Chairperson of the Union of Tanzanian Women from 1994 to 2008. Abdallah was also the principal of Buhare College from 1969 to 1973.

Abdallah was important in the foundation of Mazimbu, which would later house a school, called Solomon Mahlangu Freedom College. At the Mazimbu's establishment, Abdallah planted a "friendship" tree and drove to the sight on occasion. She made it a priority to have Mazimbu known as a place that was internationally recognized, placing it on the world map everywhere she went. Abdallah became an unofficial ambassador for the ANC, a national liberation movement, because she'd championed for its cause and spread knowledge about its existence. During Abdallah's time in the Ministry of Home Affairs, she approved of more land being utilized in Dakawa (unused land in Tanzania) for the purpose of creating more space for the ANC people who had no educational connection to the institution being built in Mazimbu.

In 1991, she inspired the launch of the Creators of Peace (CoP) global peacemakers network at the Initiatives of Change conference centre in Caux, Switzerland, urging the participants and everyone to “create peace wherever we are, in our hearts, our homes, our workplace and our community. We all pretend that someone else is the stumbling block… Could that someone be myself?” CoP has since been active in many countries, particularly in Africa (South Africa, Burundi, Kenya, Rwanda, Uganda, South Sudan, Sudan, Cameroon, Nigeria, and Tanzania).

In 1995, she was awarded the Order of the United Republic of Tanzania.
