= Adhia =

Adhia is a surname. Notable people with the surname include:

- Hasmukh Adhia (born 1958), Indian banker and government official
- Richa Adhia (born 1988), Tanzanian model and beauty pageant contestant
