= Mussa Zungu =

Speaker of the National Assembly of Tanzania

The Honourable Mussa Azzan Zungu MP

8th Speaker of the National Assembly of Tanzania
- Incumbent
- Assumed office 10 November 2025
- President: Samia Suluhu
- Preceded by: Tulia Ackson

Deputy Speaker of the National Assembly of Tanzania
- In office 2021 – November 2025
- President: Samia Suluhu
- Preceded by: Tulia Ackson

Member of Parliament for Ilala
- Incumbent
- Assumed office December 2005
- Preceded by: Iddi Simba

Minister of State in the Vice President's Office (Union and Environment)
- In office 23 January 2020 – 16 June 2020
- President: John Magufuli
- Preceded by: George Simbachawene
- Succeeded by: Ummy Mwalimu

Personal details
- Born: 25 May 1952 (age 74) Tanganyika
- Party: CCM
- Education: Military College of Aviation – Tanzania/Canada

Mussa Azzan Zungu (born 25 May 1952) is a Tanzanian CCM politician and Deputy Speaker of the Tanzania National Assembly. He is also the incumbent Member of Parliament for Ilala constituency since 2005.

He has continued to retain the parliamentary seat in 2010 and 2015. He was appointed as the Minister of State in the Vice President's office on 24 January 2020 and server for 6 months before the parliament was dissolved on 16 June 2020. He became the Deputy Speaker following the resignation of the former Speaker Job Ndugai and the accession of Tulia Ackson.
