= Mohamed Raza =

Zanzibari businessman and politician (born 1962)

Member of the Zanzibar House of Representatives for Uzini
- In office 28 March 2012 – 2020
- Preceded by: Mussa Khamis Silima
- Succeeded by: Haji Shaban Wazir
- Majority: 5,377 (91.1%)

Sports Advisor to the President of Zanzibar
- In office 1995–2000
- President: Salmin Amour

Personal details
- Born: 18 July 1962 Unguja, Sultanate of Zanzibar
- Died: 8 June 2023 (aged 60) Aga Khan Hospital
- Resting place: Dar es Salaam, Tanzania
- Party: CCM

Mohamed Raza Hassanali Dharamsi (born 18 July 1962), popularly known as Mohamed Raza, was a Zanzibari businessman and CCM politician who represented the Uzini constituency in the Zanzibar House of Representatives.

== Early life and education ==
Raza was born in the Sultanate of Zanzibar to parents of Indian ancestry. He was educated at the Shaaban Robert Secondary School from 1977 to 1980.

== Political career ==
He was elected in February 2012 to represent the Uzini constituency in the Zanzibar House of Representatives. He was sworn into office on 28 March 2012.
