= Ally Rehmtullah =

Tanzanian fashion designer (born 1986)

- Born: 18 January 1986 (age 40)
- Education: Baum School of Art; Lehigh College
- Occupation: Fashion designer
- Label: Dollywood Modeling Agency
- Website: www.allyrehmtullah.co.tz

Ally Rehmtullah (born 18 January 1986) is a Tanzanian fashion designer.

== Early life and career ==
He is a fourth generation Tanzanian of Indian descent, who studied at Baum School of Art and Lehigh Valley College in the United States, before moving back to Tanzania to work as a teacher of graphic arts while gradually shifting his career to fashion design. In September 2008, he became the first East African designer to show at London Fashion Week.
