= Law School of Tanzania =

Bar school in Tanzania

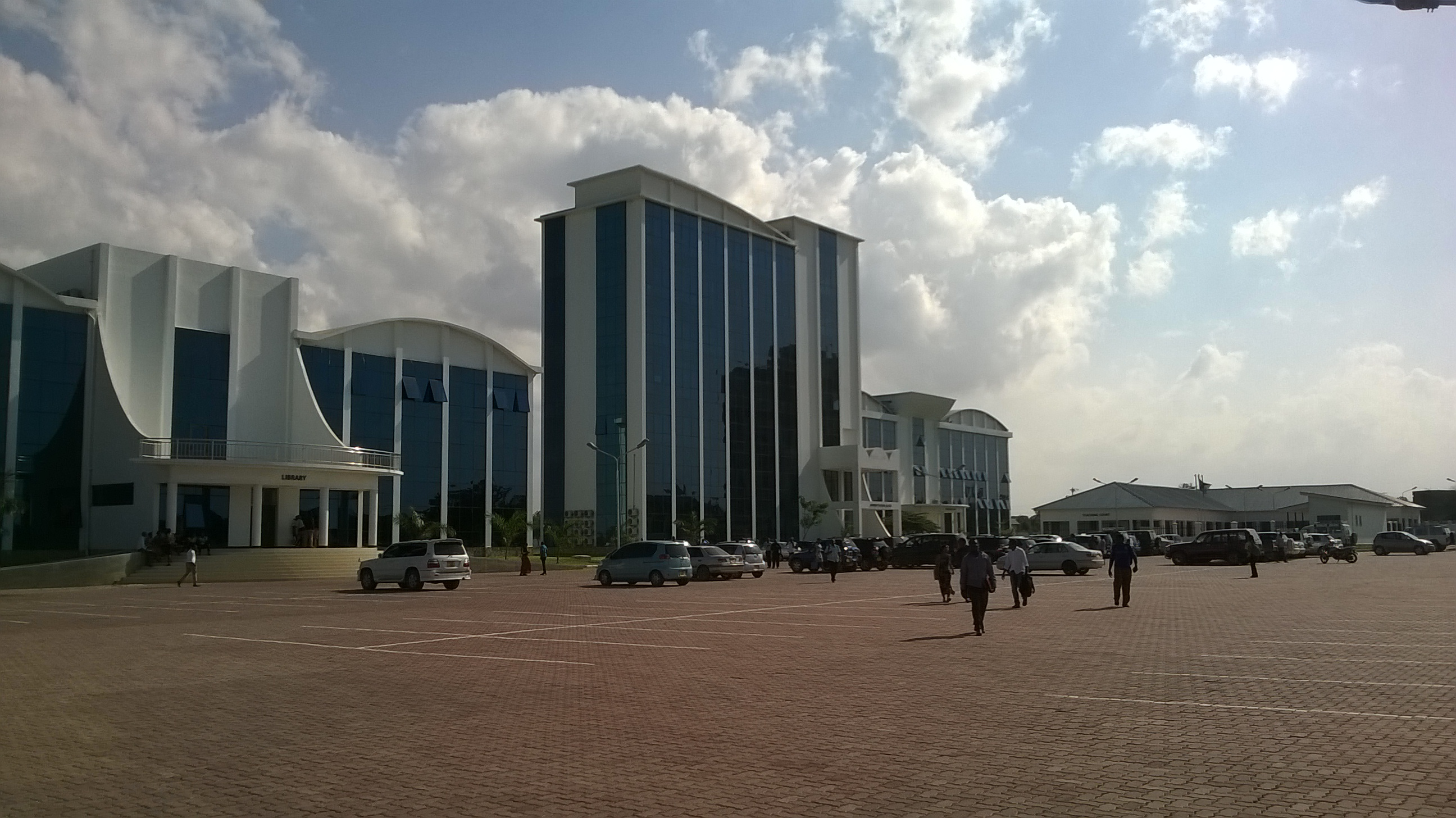
- Motto: Excellence in Legal Practice
- Established: 2008
- Chairperson: Deputy Attorney General of the United Republic of Tanzania
- Principal: Prof. Sist Joseph Mramba
- Students: 1,100
- Location: Dar es Salaam, Tanzania; 6.7860°S 39.2165°E
- Campus: Urban
- Language: English
- Website: www.lst.ac.tz

The Law School of Tanzania is the only bar school in Tanzania mainland. It was established through the Law School of Tanzania Act No. 05 of 2007 that has been amended from time to time. The school provides practical legal training to all persons who have graduated with an undergraduate degree in law from recognized universities and desire to practice law in the United Republic of Tanzania, either as a state attorney, a magistrate or as an advocate of the High Court of the United Republic of Tanzania and courts subordinate to it. Students who attend the Law School of Tanzania and pass all examinations are awarded a Postgraduate Diploma in Legal Practice and become eligible for admission to the Bar Association of Tanzania Mainland and may practice law in any country of the Commonwealth Jurisdiction.

== Programs ==
The Law School of Tanzania offers two programs:

- Postgraduate Diploma in Legal Practice
- Basic Technician Certificate in Paralegal Work
