= Adam Sapi Mkwawa =

Tanzanian politician (1920–1999)

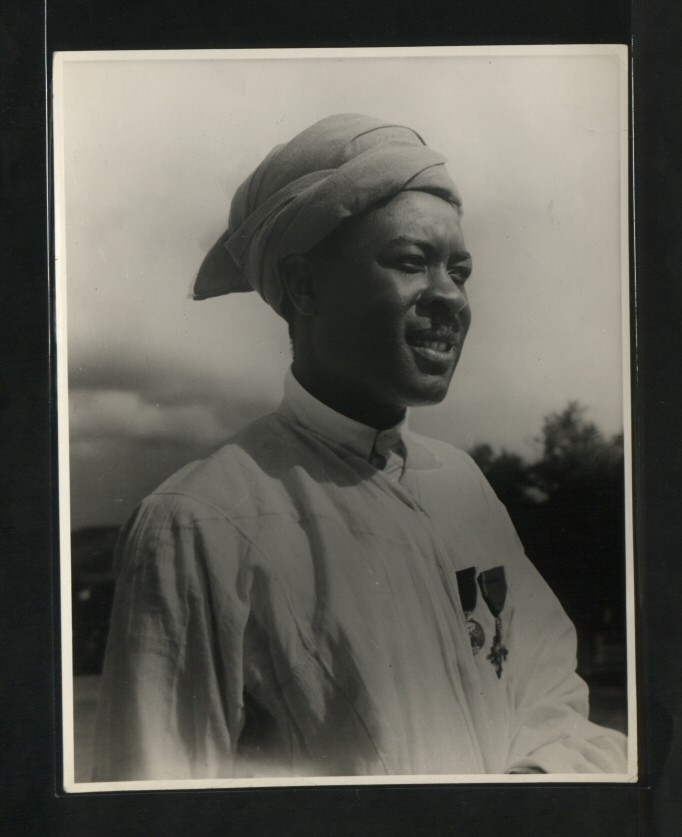
- Mkwawa in 1954

Speaker of the National Assembly of Tanzania
- In office 26 April 1964 – 19 November 1973
- Preceded by: Position established
- Succeeded by: Erasto Andrew Mbwana Mang'enya
- In office 6 November 1975 – 25 April 1994
- Preceded by: Erasto Andrew Mbwana Mang'enya
- Succeeded by: Pius Msekwa

Speaker of the National Assembly of Tanganyika
- In office 27 November 1962 – 26 April 1964
- Preceded by: Abdulkarim Yusufali Alibhai Karimjee
- Succeeded by: Position abolished

Personal details
- Born: c. 1920 Iringa Rural District, Iringa Region, Tanganyika Territory
- Died: 25 June 1999 (aged 79) Tanzania

Chief Adam Sapi Mkwawa (c. 1920 – 25 June 1999) was a Tanzanian politician and statesman who served as the Speaker of the National Assembly of Tanganyika from 1962 to 1964 and then as Speaker of the National Assembly of Tanzania from 1964 to 1973, and again from 1975 to 1994.

== Biography ==
Sapi was born in c. 1920 in Tanganyika Territory. A member of the Hehe people, he was of noble birth as the grandson of Chief Mkwawa, who was famed for resisting the Germans for seven years. He was the son of Chief Sapi Mkwawa. He attended Makerere University in Uganda. After his father's tenure as chief, Sapi was installed as chief of the Hehe people himself, a position he served in from the 1940s until 1962, when the chiefdom was abolished.

Sapi was appointed to the Tanganyika Legislative Council, established by the British Parliament in 1926, on 3 June 1947, having been the third African to be appointed to the legislature. In the 1948, he began an effort to return the skull of his grandfather, Chief Mkwawa, to his people, as it was held by Germany, which had promised to return it in the Treaty of Versailles but did not. In 1953, the governor of Tanganyika, Sir Edward Twining, located the skull in a German museum and returned it to Sapi in 1954. The return of the skull was completed at a ceremony in June 1954, which 30,000 members of the Hehe tribe attended and the Evening Sentinel described as "probably the biggest gathering ever to take place in Tanganyika."

After Tanganyika became independent, Sapi was appointed Speaker of the National Assembly of Tanganyika on 27 November 1962. He remained speaker as the country became Tanzania in 1964 and thus served as the first Speaker of the National Assembly of Tanzania. He served in the position until 1973, when he was appointed Minister of State for Capital Development. Two years later, he returned as speaker of the legislature. He also was in charge of Tanzanian elections from the 1960s to at least the 1985 in the position of chairman of the electoral commission. Sapi ended up serving as Speaker of the National Assembly until 25 April 1994, when he was succeeded by Pius Msekwa. Afterwards, he served as the chairman of the Board of Trustees of the Parks.

Sapi was appointed a Member of the Order of the British Empire (MBE) and later made an Officer of the same order (OBE). He was also the only African to serve as honorary captain of the King's African Rifles. Sapi was married, being the first Hehe chief to have only one wife, and had at least three children. He died on 25 June 1999, at the age of 79, of high blood pressure. He was described in his obituary by the Daily News as "the country's most decorated legislator, politician and leader." His funeral was attended by Julius Nyerere and Tanzanian President Benjamin Mkapa, among others. He was buried in Kalenga near the grave of his father and near the museum which holds the skull of his grandfather.
