= Edwin Semzaba =

Tanzanian novelist, playwright, actor & director (died 2016)

- Died: 17 January 2016
- Occupations: Actor, director, novelist, playwright

Edwin Semzaba was a Tanzanian novelist, playwright, actor and director.

== Biography ==
He wrote his works mainly in Swahili. He taught in the Department of Fine and Performing Arts at the University of Dar es Salaam, Tanzania, where he taught, among other courses, creative writing and acting. He won the first award of East African Writers awarded by the Institute of Swahili Research (Taasisi ya Unchunguzi wa Kiswahili, TUKI) for his novel Funke Bugebuge and the "grandchildren's adventure book writing competition" awarded by the Swedish Embassy in Tanzania (2007).

Semzaba died on 17 January 2016.

== Novels ==
- Marimba ya Majaliwa, E & D Vision Publishing, 2008
- Funke Bugebuge, Dar es Salaam University Press, 1999
- Tausi wa Alfajiri, HEKO Publishers, 1996
- Tamaa ya Boimandaa, Dar es Salaam University Press, 2002
- "The Adventures of Tunda and Zamaradi", Exodia Publishers LTD., 2016

== Plays ==
- Kinyamkera, Exodia Publishers, 2014
- Joseph na Josephine, Exodia Publishers, 2014
- Ngoswe, Dar es Salaam University Press, 1996
- Mkokoteni, Exodia Publishers, 2014
- Tendehogo, Tanzania Publishing House (TPH), 1982
- Sofia wa Gongolambotoa, Benedictine Publications, Ndanda, 1985

== Awards and honors ==
- First Prize Winner Western Zone Sabasaba Writing /Reciting Poetry competition at Kigoma 1967.
- Best Actor Award at Mkwawa High School – 1971–1972
- First Prize Winner Playwriting Competition Literature Dept (UDSM) 1975
- First Prize Winner, Novel Writing Competition East African Literature Bureau and TUKI(UDSM) 1976.
- First Prize Winner SIDA Children Adventure Book Competition, 2007.
- First Winner of the Round Six Burt Award for African Literature Writing Competition, 2016
