= Deputy Attorney General of Tanzania =

Deputy Attorney General of the United Republic of Tanzania
- Naibu Mwanasheria Mkuu wa Serikali (Swahili)
- Incumbent; Hamza Maneno since 15 August 2024
- Attorney General's Chambers
- Status: Honorable
- Abbreviation: DAG
- Seat: Dar es Salaam, Tanzania
- Appointer: President
- Term length: At the President's discretion
- Constituting instrument: Constitution of the United Republic of Tanzania, 1977
- Precursor: DAG of Tanganyika
- Formation: 1961
- First holder: David Levnc Davies
- Website: www.agctz.go.tz

Deputy Attorney General of Tanzania is the principal assistant in the discharge of functions and duties of the Attorney General of Tanzania as may be assigned by the Attorney General of Tanzania. The post is a constitutional oriented position and appointment is made by the President of the United Republic of Tanzania in subject to Article (59A) of the Constitution of the United Republic of Tanzania, 1977. The post of Deputy Attorney General of the United Republic of Tanzania was established in 1961. Generally, the functions of the Deputy Attorney General of the United Republic of Tanzania is to execute the day to a day activities of the Attorney General's Chamber of the United Republic of Tanzania.

== List of the Deputy Attorneys General of Tanzania ==
S/N	Name	Tenure
01	David Levnc Davies	1961–1963
02	Mark D. Bomani	1963–1965
03	Bob Makani	1965–1965
04	Arnorld Kileo	1965–1976
05	Damian Z. Lubuva	1976–1977
06	George Liundi	1977–1977
07	Damian S. Meela	1977–1987
08	T.L.Mkude	1987–1991
09	Andrew Chenge	1991–1993
10	Felix Mrema	1993–1997
11	Kulwa Masaba	1997–2002
12	Johnson P.M Mwanyika	2002–2005
13	Vincent D.K Lyimo	2005–2008
14	Sazi B. Salula	2008–2009
15	George Masaju	2009–2015
16	Dr. Tulia Ackson	September 2015 – 15 November 2015
17	Gerson Mdemu	November 2015 – February 2018
18	Paul Joel Ngwembe	February 2018 – April 2018
19	Dr. Evaristo Emmanuel Longopa	April 2018 – September 2023
20	Hon. Amb. Prof. Kennedy Godfrey Gastorn	September 2023 - August 2024
21	Samwel Marco Maneno	August 2024 - Present
