= Karimjee family =

Tanzanian business family

The Karimjee family are a Tanzanian business family of Indian origin and owners of the Karimjee Group. Since the 1800s, Karimjee family business ventures have included trade, agriculture, real estate and various products in the mobility sector. Members of the Karimjee family have participated in public service with Abdulkarim Karimjee serving as Speaker of the National Assembly from 1956 to 1962. Karimjee Hall was donated by the family to the Dar es Salaam Municipal Council in 1955. It was used at various times as the Legislative Assembly and the first Houses of Parliament.

== History ==
The Karimjee family came to Zanzibar when Jivanjee Budhabhoy emigrated in the 19th Century from Mandvi, Gujarat. He established a company, Jivanjee Budhabhoy & Co., in 1825. Jivanjee Budhabhoy & Co sold copra and cloves among other items to India and brought American and European cloth to East Africa.

Jivanjee Budhabhoy had five children, including Karimjee Jivanjee (1826–1898). In 1861 Karimjee Jivanjee set up his own business in Zanzibar, Karimjee Jivanjee & Co.

Karimjee Jivanjee had one son, Alibhai Karimjee Jivanjee (1851-1883). Alibhai Karimjee Jivanjee married Fatema Jafferjee and they had four sons: Abdulhussein Karimjee Jivanjee (1870- 1892), Hassanali Karimjee Jivanjee (1872-1918), Mohamedali Karimjee Jivanjee (1876-1940), and Yusufali Karimjee Jivanjee (1882-1966). Alibhai Karimjee Jivanjee died at a young age, and his sons were raised by their mother Fatema Jafferjee and their grandfather Karimjee Jivanjee.

Karimjee Jivanjee & Co continued to operate, trading mainly in agricultural products and textiles, importing goods from Europe, the Far East, India and exporting goods to those same destinations as well as The Seychelles, Mauritius and Ceylon. Karimjee Jivanjee & Co owned a vast fleet of dhows which were used especially to trade with ports up and down the Swahili Coast.

=== Growth and diversification ===
Between 1915 and 1925, Karimjee Jivanjee & Co. established branch offices in Mombasa, Dar es Salaam Tanga, Lindi, and Mikindani.
