= List of speakers of the National Assembly of Tanganyika =

The office of Speaker of the National Assembly of Tanganyika was originally held by the Governor of Tanganyika, from the National Assembly's creation in 1926 as the Legislative Council of Tanzania Mainland, until 1953. The first speaker of the office not a governor of Tanganyika was Sir William Scupham and the last was Adam Sapi Mkwaka, who, in 1964, became the Speaker of the National Assembly of Tanzania.

Below is a list of all the individuals who have held the office of Speaker of the National Assembly of Tanganyika.

Name	Took office	Left office	Notes
Governor of Tanganyika	7 December 1926	1 November 1953	
Sir William Scupham	1 November 1953	30 April 1958	
Sir John Harry Barclay Nihill	1 May 1958	31 December 1958	
Abdulkarim Yusufali Alibhai Karimjee	1 January 1956	26 December 1962	
Adam Sapi Mkwawa	December 27, 1962	1964	Mkwawa continued as Speaker of the National Assembly of Tanzania

== See also ==
- List of speakers of the National Assembly of Tanzania
