= Shaaban Robert Secondary School =

- Swahili: Shule ya Sekondari Shaaban Robert

Location
- Magore Street; Dar es Salaam; Tanzania
- Coordinates: 6°48′20.84″S 39°16′51.34″E

Information
- School type: Private
- Motto: Strive for Excellence
- Religious affiliation: Non-denominational
- Established: 14 May 1963
- Authority: Dar es Salaam Secondary Education Society
- School number: S0342
- Chairman: Sir Andy Chande
- Headmaster: S. D. Ramji
- Gender: Coeducational
- Age: 14 to 19
- Education system: Tanzanian
- Language: English
- Hours in school day: 7.15 AM - 2.00 PM
- Classrooms: 29
- Campus type: Urban
- Houses: Topaz; Saphire; Emerald; Ruby
- National ranking: 94/3,392
- Yearbook: The Fikara
- School fees: TSh 3.4 million (≈US$1,600)
- Alumni: Shaabanians

Shaaban Robert Secondary School (SRSS) is a co-educational secondary school based in Dar es Salaam, Tanzania. The school is named after the celebrated Tanzanian poet and author, Shaaban Bin Robert.

== Background ==
The School is owned by the Dar-es-Salaam Secondary Education Society. It is run by a Board of Governors and a Management Committee. Sir Andy Chande is the Chairman of the Board of Governors of the School and President of the Dar es Salaam Secondary Education Society.

The school has about 50 full-time teaching staff and offers the following facilities:

- 27 class rooms
- 5 staff rooms
- 6 Laboratories
- A computer laboratory
- A geography room
- A library
- Teachers' Resource Centre
- A staff refreshment room.
- A multi purpose hall with a seating capacity of 1000 people.
- A sick bay
- An audiovisual room
- A reprographic room
- A basketball, volleyball and tennis court; facilities for badminton and table tennis.
- Football and Hockey ground and a running track.
- A cricket pitch.
- Two canteens

Co - Curricular activities include: debate, extempore, drama, elocution, seminars, field trips, quiz competition and club activities including fine arts and French

== Notable alumni ==
- Adam Malima, Deputy Minister of Agriculture, Food and Cooperatives
- Richa Adhia, Miss Tanzania 2007
- Mohamed Raza, member of the Zanzibar House of Representatives
- Fredrick Alban Kayumbo, Founder of Aspire Group (www.aspiregroup.co.tz), 1989-1993
- Khalid Mohammed aka TID, Bongo flava artist
