= Pius Msekwa =

Tanzanian politician (born 1935)

CCM Vice Chairman (Mainland)
- In office 2008–2012
- Chairman: Jakaya Kikwete
- Succeeded by: Philip Mangula

3rd Speaker of the National Assembly of Tanzania
- In office 28 April 1994 – 28 November 2005
- Preceded by: Adam Sapi Mkwawa
- Succeeded by: Samuel Sitta

Personal details
- Born: 9 June 1935 (age 91) Tanganyika Territory
- Party: CCM
- Spouse: Anna Abdallah
- Education: Makerere University (BA); UDSM (MA)

Pius Msekwa (born 9 June 1935) is a retired Tanzanian politician who was previously the Speaker of the National Assembly of Tanzania from April 1994 to November 2005. He chaired the CPA Executive Committee from 1999 to 2002. He later became vice-chairman of the ruling party Chama Cha Mapinduzi.

== Bibliography ==
- Pius Msekwa, Reflections on Tanzania's First Multi-Party Parliament : 1995-2000, ISBN 978-9976-60-333-0
