= Anne Makinda =

Tanzanian politician

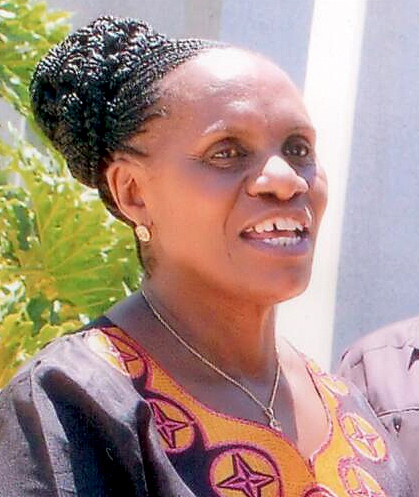

6th Speaker of the National Assembly
- In office 10 November 2010 – 16 November 2015
- Deputy: Job Ndugai
- Preceded by: Samuel Sitta
- Succeeded by: Job Ndugai

Deputy Speaker of the National Assembly
- In office December 2005 – July 2010
- Succeeded by: Job Ndugai

Member of Parliament
- In office October 1995 – July 2015
- Constituency: Njombe South
- In office 1975–1995
- Appointed by: Nyerere and Mwinyi
- Constituency: None (Nominated MP)

Personal details
- Born: 26 July 1949 (age 76) Njombe, Tanganyika Territory
- Party: Tanganyika African National Union; Chama Cha Mapinduzi

Military service
- Allegiance: United Rep. of Tanzania
- Branch/service: National Service
- Military camp: Mafinga and Oljoro
- Duration: 1 year

Anne Semamba Makinda (born 26 July 1949) is a Tanzanian politician who served as the 6th Speaker of the National Assembly from 2010 to 2015, and in the assembly from 1975 to 2015. She was the first woman to serve as Deputy Speaker and Speaker in the assembly.

== Early life ==
Anne Semamba Makinda was born in Njombe, Tanganyika Territory, on 15 July 1949. Her father was a regional commissioner and member of the National Assembly. She was educated at the Masasi Girls School from 1965 to 1968, and was chair of the Tanganyika African National Union's youth wing there. She was educated at the Kilakala Girls' Secondary School from 1969 to 1970. She was trained as an accountant at the Institute of Development Management.

== Career ==
=== Tanzanian ===
The youth wing nominated Makinda for a seat in the National Assembly in 1975. At age 26 she was the youngest member of the body. She switched to a constituency seat in the 1995 election, where she won in Njombe South and has held that seat since.

Makinda was a backbencher until her appointment as Minister of State in 1983, and supported the creation of the National Museum of Tanzania during her tenure. From 1990 to 1995, she was Minister for Community Development, Women and Children. She was the chair of the Natural Resources, Environment and Poverty committee from 2000 to 2005. She was the regional commissioner of the Ruvuma Region from 1995 to 2000.

Makinda was the Deputy Speaker from 2005 to 2010, and defeated Mabere Marando succeeded Samuel Sitta as speaker by a vote of 265 to 53 votes in 2010. She was the first woman to hold either position. She declined to seek reelection in 2015.

=== International ===
Makinda was chair of UNICEF's executive board from 1 August 1993 to February 1994, when the position was changed to president and she continued to serve until 31 December. She was the chair of the Southern African Development Community's (SADC) Parliamentary Forum from 2014 to 2016.

SADC's election monitoring team for the 2024 Namibian general election was led by Makinda. She is the chancellor of the Hubert Kairuki Memorial University.

== Works cited ==
=== Journals ===
- Mrumah, Anagladness (2024). "Women in Tanzanian Political History: A Case of Anne S.Makinda, 1949-2020". International Journal of Research and Innovation in Social Science. S. Rajaratnam School of International Studies: 760–770.

=== News ===
- "Anne Makinda in control of Tanzania's Bunge". The EastAfrican. 19 December 2010.
- "Curtain falls for Makinda after forty-year run". The Citizen. 14 November 2015. Archived from the original on 14 July 2025.
- "Former Speaker Makinda to confer degrees to 291 HKMU graduates". Daily News. 30 November 2022. Archived from the original on 14 July 2025.

=== Web ===
- "MHE. Anne Makinda Aridhishwa Na Uchaguzi Mkuu Wa Namibia Asema Ulikuwa Wa Amani Na Utulivu". Ministry of Foreign Affairs and East African Cooperation. Archived from the original on 14 July 2025.
- "UNICEF History". UNICEF. Archived from the original on 9 January 2019.
