= Bulyaga =

Ward in Rungwe, Mbeya, Tanzania

- Ward
- Location within Tanzania
- Coordinates: 9.252°S 33.652°E
- Country: Tanzania
- Region: Mbeya Region
- District: Rungwe District
- Ward: Bulyaga

Government
  - Type: Council

Population (2016)
  - Total: 7,046
- Time zone: UTC+3 (EAT)
- Postcode: 53501
- Area code: 025
- Website: District Website

Bulyaga is an administrative ward in the Rungwe district of the Mbeya Region of Tanzania. In 2016 the Tanzania National Bureau of Statistics report there were 7,046 people in the ward, from 6,393 in 2012, and 7,869 in 2002.

== Neighborhoods ==
The ward has 4 neighborhoods.

- Mpindo
- Bulyaga Juu
- Bulyaga Kati
- Igamba
