= Mary Atieno Ominde =

Kenyan gospel musician, a pastor, and a teacher

Mary Atieno
- Born: Nyanza Province, Kenya
- Children: 3
- Awards: Groove Awards

Mary Atieno is a Kenyan gospel musician, pastor, and teacher whose work spans over four decades. Atieno is blind. She was awarded an Outstanding Contributor category in the Groove Awards in 2012.

== Early life ==
Mary Atieno was born in Kirengo village, Karungu in Nyatike District, Nyanza. She was the first of nine children born to Francis Yara and Polina Ajwang. Her father worked as a headmaster in various schools in Nyanza, and her mother was a housewife. Mary was born blind, but her father realised it when she was five months old, which enabled him to plan her education since he was a teacher himself. She joined Asumbi Mission School and then moved to St. Oda's Aluor Girls School for the Blind, where she joined a choir called Dodo. She later joined Thika Salvation Army High School for the blind, before proceeding to Kenyatta University, where she earned a bachelor's degree in Education. While at these institutions, her passion for music thrived after she reported being miraculously healed of heart disease. In 1978, at the age of 17, Atieno was diagnosed with heart disease, and doctors were skeptical of her chances of surviving the ailment. Atieno later said, "I turned to prayer. I knew God created me and it was only He who could heal me. I promised God that if I got healed, I would serve Him for the rest of my life. He answered my prayer. When I went for another test, there was no problem at all with my heart. Subsequent tests have shown my heart is healthy".

== Career and ministry life ==
Atieno embarked on a teaching career in 1998. She taught English and later transitioned to Christian Religious Education, teaching at Buruburu Girls Secondary School, Nairobi. She started her music career in 1979 as a singer in Makwaya style choir, making her the first solo woman gospel musician in Kenya. Atieno joined the International Fellowship of Christ (IFC) choir, with whom she has managed to produce several albums. As of 2015, Atieno had released approximately fourteen albums. In 2012, she won the Outstanding Contributor award in the Groove Awards, a Kenyan annual Gospel award where the public chooses winners. Atieno also pastors in the sanctuary of Hope, a worship center established in 2001 with her husband.

== Personal life ==
Mary is married to Alex Ominde, and they have two daughters and a son.

== Albums ==
- Adamu na Eva (1982).
- Hakuna Mungu Mwingine (1983).
- Nani kama Yehova (1998).
- Njooni Tumsifu( 2004).
