= Job Ndugai =

Tanzanian politician (1963–2025)

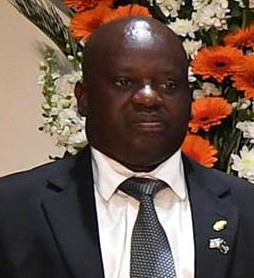

7th Speaker of the National Assembly
- In office 17 November 2015 – 6 January 2022
- Deputy: Tulia Ackson
- Preceded by: Anne Makinda
- Succeeded by: Tulia Ackson

Deputy Speaker of the National Assembly
- In office November 2010 – November 2015
- Speaker: Anne Makinda
- Succeeded by: Tulia Ackson

Member of Parliament for Kongwa
- In office November 2000 – August 2025

Personal details
- Born: 21 January 1963 Tanganyika
- Died: 6 August 2025 (aged 62)
- Party: CCM
- Spouse: Fatuma Mgagna
- Education: Mweka College (Dip); University of Dar es Salaam; Agricult. Uni. of Norway (MSc); Open University of Tanzania (LLB)

Military service
- Allegiance: United Rep. of Tanzania
- Branch/service: National Service
- Military camp: Ruvu and Maramba
- Duration: 1 year

Job Yustino Ndugai (21 January 1963 – 6 August 2025) was a Tanzanian politician who served as the Speaker of the National Assembly of Tanzania from November 2015 until his resignation on 6 January 2022. Previously he was Deputy Speaker from 2010 to 2015 before he became Speaker under Magufuli government.

== Early life and education ==
Ndugai was educated at Matare Primary School, Kibaha Secondary School and Old Moshi High School, udsm.

== Political career ==
Ndugai served as the member of parliament for the Kongwa constituency since 2000. Ndugai was named as the most active MP in the 9th Tanzanian Parliament.

He was Deputy Speaker of the National Assembly from 2010 to 2015. He was elected as Speaker of the National Assembly on 17 November 2015. Ndugai was also elected as Speaker for a second term in November 2020. Ndugai resigned on 6 January 2022.

== Death ==
Ndugai died on 6 August 2025, at the age of 62.
