= Mazimbu Graves =

Cemetery in Tanzania

Coordinates: 6.7975770°S 37.645924°E

Mazimbu Graves in Morogoro Region, Tanzania is a cemetery for deceased South African anti-apartheid activists who died in exile.
