= Andy Chande =

Sir Jayantilal Keshavji Chande KBE
- Born: Jayantilal Keshavji Chande; 7 May 1928; Mombasa, Kenya Colony
- Died: 7 April 2017 (aged 88)
- Citizenship: Tanzania
- Education: University of Pune
- Notable work: A Knight in Africa: Journey from Bukene
- Awards: KBE; Pravasi Bharatiya Samman
- Website: andychande.com

Jayantilal Keshavji "Andy" Chande KBE (7 May 1928 – 7 April 2017) was a Tanzanian businessman, philanthropist and a freemason.

== Background ==
On 10 August 2007, the Swahili translation of his book A Knight in Africa (Shujaa Katika Afrika: Safari Kutoka Bukene) was launched at the Shaaban Robert Secondary School hall, by President of Tanzania, Jakaya Kikwete. Other figures in attendance included the Canadian High Commissioner to Tanzania, Dr Andrew McAlister

== Awards ==
- Knight Commander of the Most Excellent Order of the British Empire, 2003
- Pravasi Bharatiya Samman, 2005
