= Bahati Bukuku =

Tanzanian gospel singer

- Born: October 1981 (age 44)
- Occupations: Gospel artist, actress

Bahati Bukuku is a Tanzanian gospel singer, vocalist, and actress known for gospel hits songs like Dunia Haina Huruma, Songa Mbele, Maamuzi Yako, Abneri, Wewe ni Mungu, Umewazidi Wote and many more. She has also acted in some Christian Bongo movies with singer Jennifer Mgendi such as "Teke la Mama" and "Nipo Studio."

Bahati Bukuku was born in October 1981 in Rungwe District, Mbeya Region, and was raised in Mbeya Region. She studied at Muungano Primary school and Meta Secondary school.

After graduating from secondary school, Bahati Bukuku moved to Dar es Salaam to resit her secondary examination. It was during this time that she began singing and subsequently recorded her first album, "Yashinde Mapito" which made her known all over the country.
