= George Mcheche Masaju =

Tanzanian attorney general

The Honourable George Mcheche Masaju
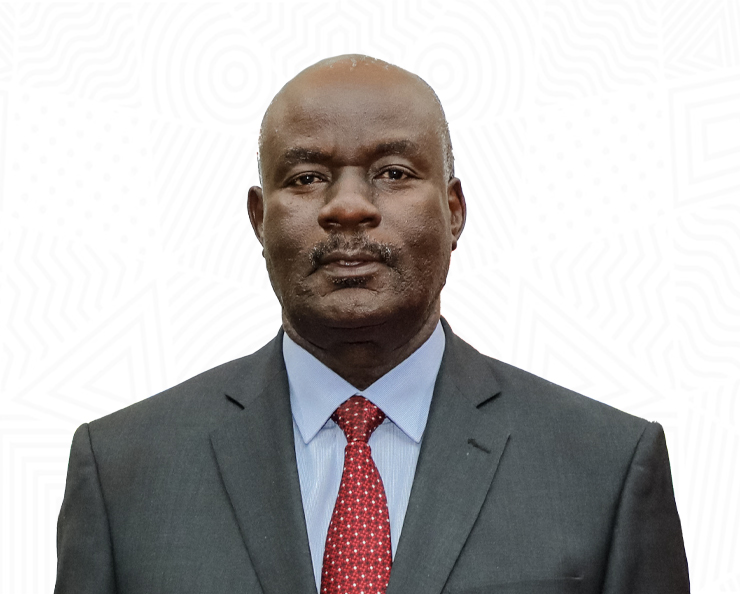

9th Chief Justice of the Judiciary of Tanzania
- Incumbent
- Assumed office 15 June 2025
- Appointed by: Samia Suluhu Hassan
- Preceded by: Ibrahim Hamis Juma

Personal details
- Born: Tanzania
- Citizenship: Tanzania
- Profession: Judge

George Mcheche Masaju was the attorney general of Tanzania until February 1, 2018. He was appointed by President Jakaya Kikwete on 3 January 2015 and he continued to be the attorney general in Magufuli's cabinet. On 13 June 2025 he was appointed as The Chief Justice of the Judiciary of Tanzania by President Samia Suluhu Hassan. He replaces Prof Ibrahim Juma who has retired.

== Early life and career ==
Before joining the attorney general's chambers in 2009 as deputy AG, he served as a legal adviser to the president.

Masaju also serves as the board chairman of the Law School of Tanzania.

=== Attorney General ===
He was sworn in as attorney general on 5 January 2015 at the State House and reappointed to that position on 5 November 2015.
