= List of speakers of the National Assembly of Tanzania =

Speakers of the National Assembly of Tanzania

The speaker of the National Assembly of Tanzania is the presiding officer of the National Assembly, the unicameral legislature of the United Republic of Tanzania.

== List of speakers ==
Below is a list of the individuals who have held the role of Speaker of the National Assembly.

Name	Took office	Left office	Notes
Adam Sapi Mkwawa	26 April 1964	19 November 1973	Mkwawa was elected as Speaker of the National Assembly of Tanganyika on 27 November 1962
Erasto Andrew Mbwana Mang'enya	20 November 1973	5 November 1975	
Adam Sapi Mkwawa	6 November 1975	25 April 1994	
Pius Msekwa	28 April 1994	28 November 2005	Retired
Samuel Sitta	28 December 2005	2010	Retired
Anne Makinda	10 November 2010	16 November 2015	Retired
Job Ndugai	17 November 2015	06 January 2022	Job Ndugai resigned his position
Tulia Ackson	1 February 2022	10 November 2025	Hon Abdulkarim Yusufali Alibai Karimjee speaker 1953-1962
Mussa Zungu	10 November 2025	Incumbent	

== See also ==
- List of speakers of the National Assembly of Tanganyika
