= Richa Adhia =

Tanzanian beauty pageant winner (born 1988)

- Born: Richa Maria Adhia; 1 May 1988 (age 38); Mwanza, Tanzania
- Education: Shaaban Robert Secondary School
- Occupations: Model, Actor, Entrepreneur
- Spouse: Haninder Sachdeva
- Beauty pageant titleholder
- Title: Miss Tanzania 2007; Miss Earth Tanzania 2006; Miss India Tanzania 2010; Miss India Worldwide 2010 (Top 10 Finalist) (Top Model Award Winner)
- Eye color: green
- Major competitions: Miss Earth 2006, Miss World 2007, Miss India Worldwide 2010

Richa Maria Adhia (born 1 May 1988), simply known as Richa Adhia, is a Tanzanian model and beauty pageant titleholder who won Miss Earth Tanzania 2006, Miss Tanzania 2007 and Miss India Tanzania 2010. Born and brought up in Tanzania, she is of Indian descent.

She represented Tanzania in both Miss Earth 2006 in the Philippines and Miss World 2007 in China. So far, she remains the only Tanzanian beauty pageant contestant to have represented her country in both of the International pageants. In 2010 she also became the first contestant to represent Tanzania at the Miss India Worldwide pageant where she was among the Top 10 finalists and won the Top Model Award.

== Early life ==
Richa Adhia grew up in Mwanza, Tanzania and went to Lake English Medium Primary School. She later moved to the city of Dar Es Salaam and went to Shaban Robert Secondary School. Coming from a humble background, she first began working at the age of 13 and was scouted as a model at the age of 15 by a well-renowned fashion designer Mustafa Hassanali. This went on to become her breakthrough as a famous Indian model who walked the ramp for various designers nationally and internationally.

At the age of 19, she joined the beauty pageant world and won various pageants before becoming an entrepreneur and starting a business in beauty, real estate and events management.

She later founded Richa Adhia’s Foundation (RAF) which worked with the elderly to provide shelter and free eye treatments supported by IPP Media.

== Career ==
=== Miss Earth Tanzania 2006 ===
Adhia won Miss Earth Tanzania 2006 and represented Tanzania in Miss Earth 2006 in the Philippines where she was initially counted among the strongest contestants from Africa, after being placed among the Top 15 best swimsuit contestants. However, she was unable to make a cut into the semifinalists in the Final Show.

=== Miss Tanzania 2007 ===
After completing her reign as Miss Earth Tanzania in 2006, Richa, went ahead to participate in other regional beauty contests and finally won Miss Kinondoni 2007, after which she was able to participate in Miss Tanzania 2007 contest which she also won. There was a controversy over her win due to her race, as she was of Indian origin. However, despite the mixed reactions, she went ahead to participate in Miss World 2007 contest in China the same year and became the first Asian ethnic contestant to represent an East African country in the Miss World contest.

=== Miss India Worldwide 2010 ===
On 6 March 2010, Richa made the history as the first contestant to represent Tanzania in the Miss India Worldwide pageant, the contest was held in Durban, South Africa. She secured a place among the Top 10 finalists and was also crowned the Top Model winner.

== Personal life ==
In 2018 she married Haninder Sachdeva, a UK based hotelier and entrepreneur and settled in the United Kingdom where they run a hotel asset management company called Eight Continents Hotels and Resorts.

== Filmography ==
Year	Title	Ref.
2009	Full Moon	
2012	Zamora	
2013	Siri ya Mtungi	
